= St-Viateur Bagel =

Bakery in Montreal, Quebec

Coordinates: 45°31′22″N 73°36′07″W

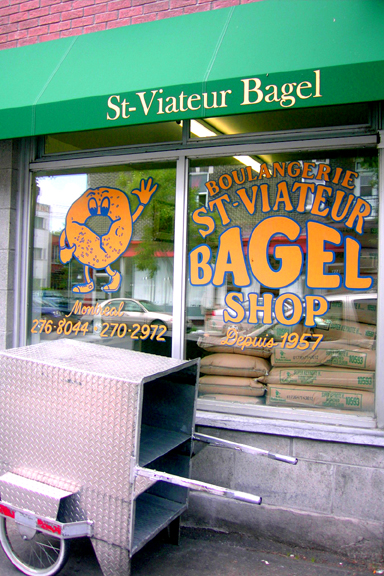
Exterior view, with metal cart in front, used to transport bagels

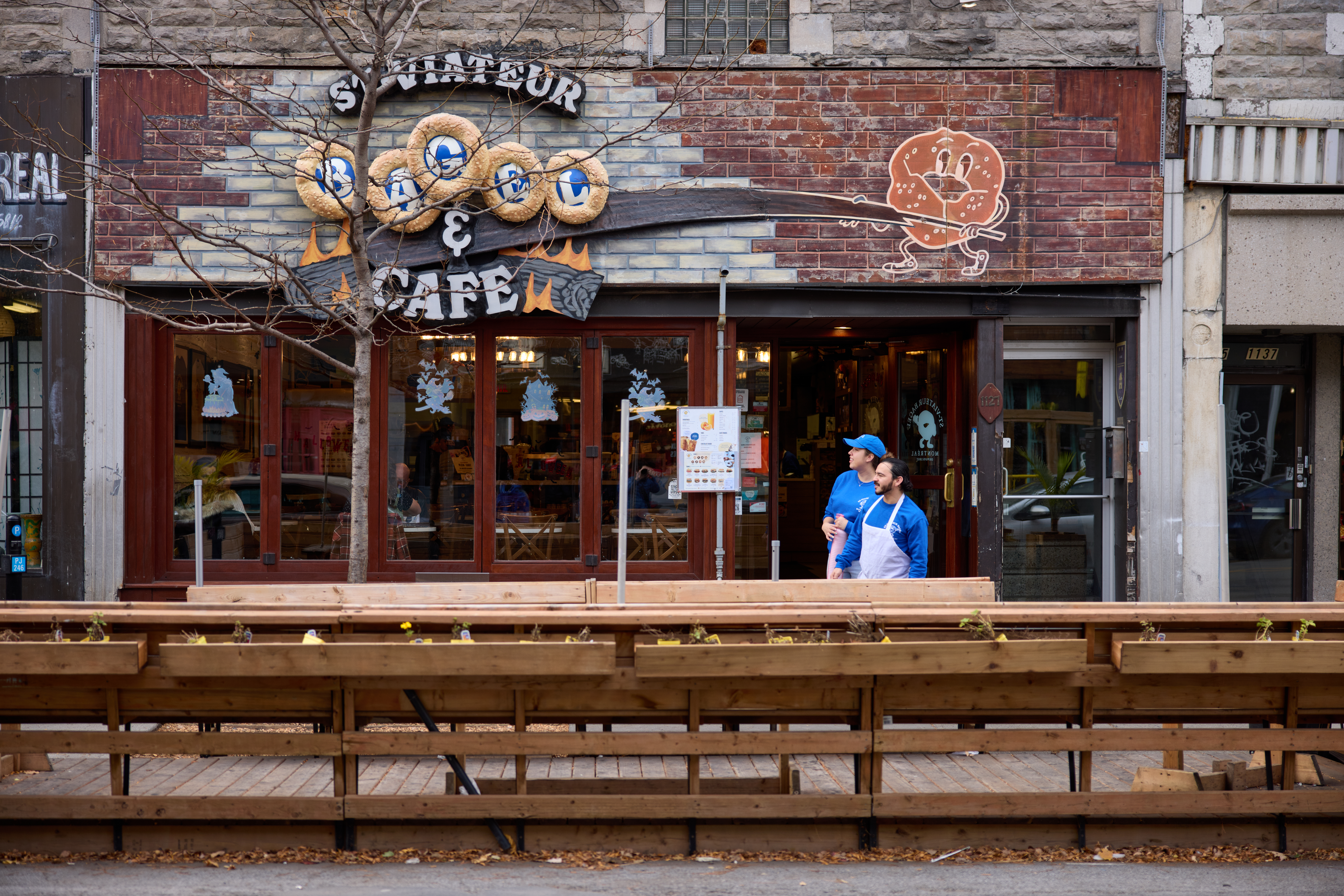
St-Viateur has various branch locations besides the original bakery, including this one pictured on Mount Royal Avenue.

St-Viateur Bagel is a Montreal-style bagel bakery located in the neighbourhood of Mile End in the borough of Le Plateau-Mont-Royal, Montreal, Quebec, Canada.

== History ==
St-Viateur Bagel was established on May 21, 1957, by Myer Lewkowicz, a Holocaust survivor who moved to Canada in 1953. Lewkowicz had grown up poor in a shtetl near Kraków, Poland. Lewkowicz spoke of his experience in the Holocaust influencing the opening of the shop by stating "At Buchenwald, all I dreamt of was a piece of bread". He learned the trade as an employee of Montreal Bagel Bakery, another local bagel shop owned by Hyman Seligman. The shop is named after the street it is located on, St-Viateur Street, and is one of the longest-running bagel shops in Montreal. In 1985 St-Viateur Bagel suffered an extensive fire, but the wood stove remained entirely intact.

St-Viateur Bagel has three bakeries, four bagel cafés, a food truck, and an online store, in addition to the original storefront. In March 2019, the shop's Monkland Avenue café permanently closed due to the end of their 18-year lease and rising rent prices. Today, the bakery is owned by Joe Morena, who had previously worked at the shop for 15 years, and competed with the nearby Fairmount Bagel for the title of Montreal's best bagel.

In 2017, St-Viateur Bagel celebrated its 60th anniversary.

St-Viateur Bagel has a long-running rivalry with Fairmount Bagel, another Montreal-style bagel bakery in the Mile End, which is often called the “bagel war”. Both bakeries grew out of the Yiddish-speaking Jewish immigrant community that settled along Saint-Laurent Boulevard in the early twentieth century, where historians have found that living and working close together helped newcomers become economically independent. Fairmount traces its origins to a bakery that Isadore Shlafman is reported to have opened on Saint-Laurent Boulevard in 1919, although it appears in city directories only from 1932. It moved to Fairmount Avenue in 1949.Myer Lewkowicz, who had worked in Montreal’s bagel trade, opened St-Viateur Bagel in 1957. Both bakeries hand-roll their bagels, boil them in honey-sweetened water and bake them in wood-fired ovens. One food writer has described St-Viateur’s bagels as less dense and slightly sweeter than Fairmount’s, and which bakery makes the better bagel remains a common debate among Montrealers and visitors.

== Locations ==
The flagship bakery is located at 263 rue St-Viateur West. The four cafés are located across the Greater Montreal Region.

- 1127, ave. Mont-Royal E.
- 821 Tecumseh, Dollard-Des Ormeaux
- 1585 boul. Dagenais W., Laval
- 10350, rue Renaude-Lapointe, Anjou

St-Viateur has a bagel bar on the same street as the flagship location and a bakery in Marché Esposito on boul. Marcel Laurin.

== Cultural significance ==
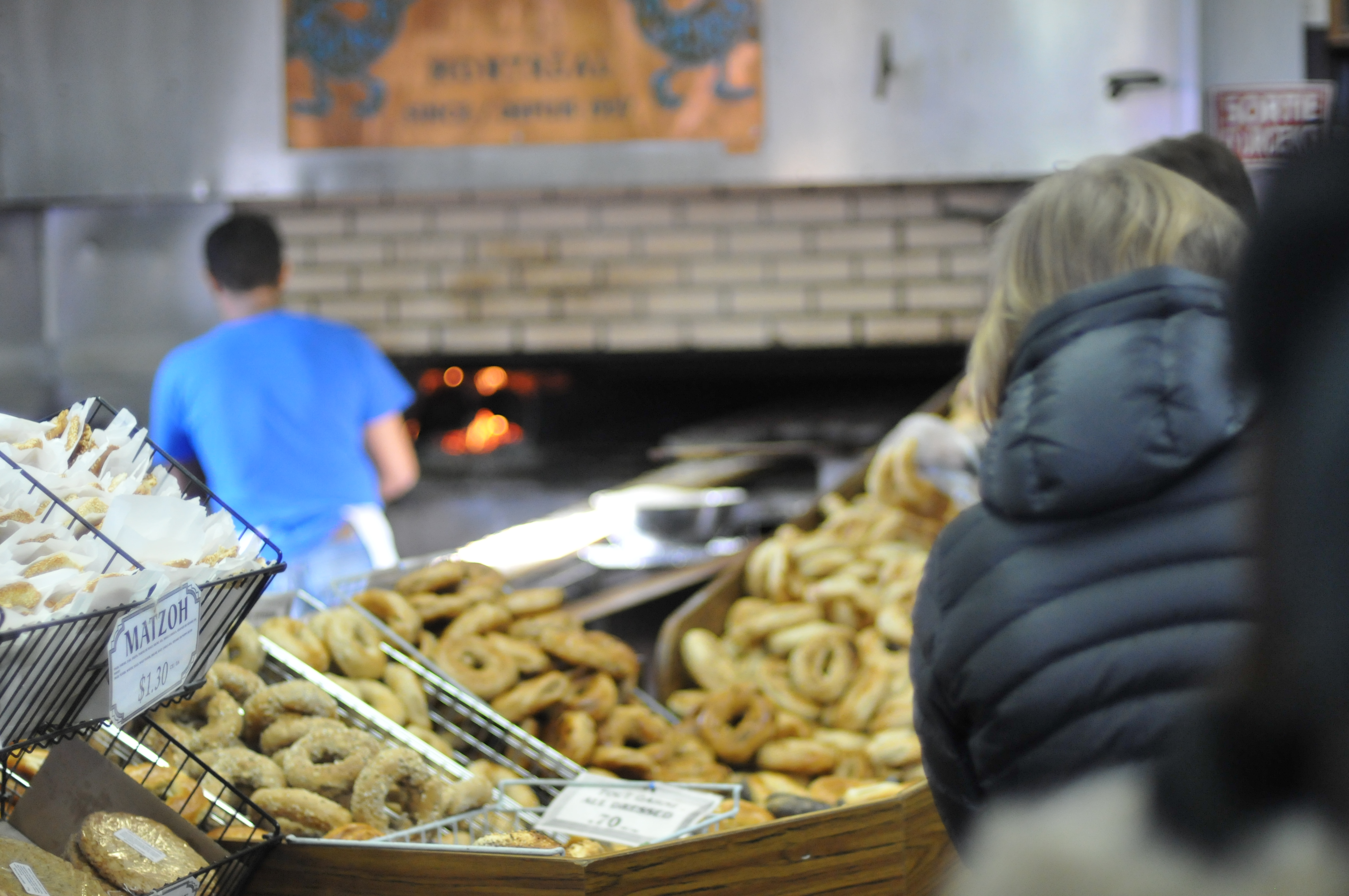
Interior view with wood-fired oven at the rear, St-Viateur Bagel

St-Viateur Bagel Shop lies on the border of the Jewish Quarter and the Mile End neighbourhood. In addition to St-Viateur Bagel Shop, Montreal's Jewish Quarter is also the home of Schwartz's deli, Moishes Steakhouse, Cheskie's Bakery, and Beauty's Luncheonette, all of which have a long history within the Jewish community in Montreal. A study done by the Université de Montréal explains that the large influence of Jewish food in Montreal culinary culture is likely because of how inexpensive and widely-accessible items such as bagels and smoked meat were in Montreal in the early 20th century. This is due to the fact that there was a large Jewish immigrant population which put down roots along Boulevard St. Laurent. Professor of Theology Olivier Bauer of the Université de Montréal explains in the study that the roundness of a bagel represents infinity and immortality. It is because of this representation that bagels are often served at bris ceremonies—the celebration of a baby boy's circumcision—and at shiva gatherings—the mourning period after a death has occurred.

== Products ==
Scholars have described the Montreal-style bagel and smoked meat as a hybrid of Jewish, Central European and North American culinary traditions. The original bakery on St-Viateur Street in the Mile End sells fresh bagels for takeout only, while the company’s bagel cafés offer a broader menu that includes bagel sandwiches, salads and beverages. The first St-Viateur Bagel & Café opened on Mont Royal Avenue in the Plateau-Mont-Royal in 1996. In 2013, the company launched a food truck serving bagel sandwiches, which was reported to be the only food truck in Montreal dedicated to bagels at the time. The truck operates from spring to fall in the Greater Montreal area and is available for private and corporate events. The company also offers catering, including bagel platters with cream cheese and smoked salmon.

== Bagel-making process ==
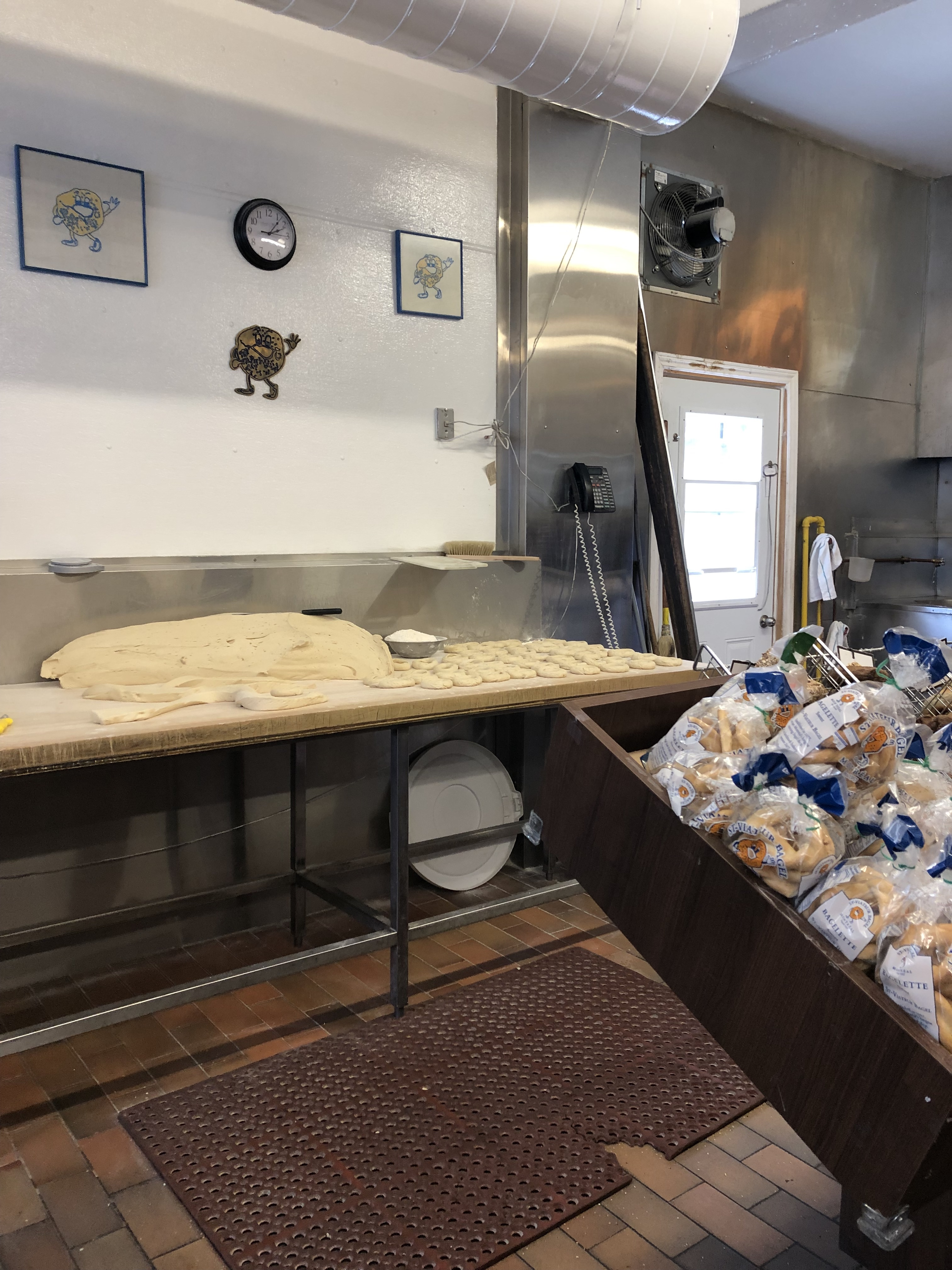
After the dough is made, small pieces are cut and are formed into the bagel shape

Since the shop opened in 1957, their process of producing bagels has stayed true to the original recipe. According to the website, the bagel-making process begins by combining whole natural ingredients into dough, which is then cut and prepared in small batches. The dough is hand-rolled and shaped with a center hole on a hardwood surface to ensure even browning and toasting. Next, the bagels are simmered in honey water, removed with a wide metal strainer to cool, and arranged on wooden boards. Depending on the variety, they are coated with toppings such as sesame seeds, poppy seeds, or an all-dressed mixture. The bagels are then baked in wood-burning ovens, where they are rotated and shuffled until they reach a uniform golden brown. Once baked, they are removed from the oven using a hardwood plank called a sheeba and placed in a wooden bin to cool. Finally, the cooled bagels are packed by the dozen for distribution across North America or for pickup at store counters in the Greater Montreal area. In contrast to the New York-style bagel which contains similar ingredients, the Montreal bagel differs in size, taste, and style: the Montreal bagel tends to be sweeter, thinner, and has a larger hole. The authentic wood-burning oven creates the crispy outer texture characteristic of a Montreal bagel.

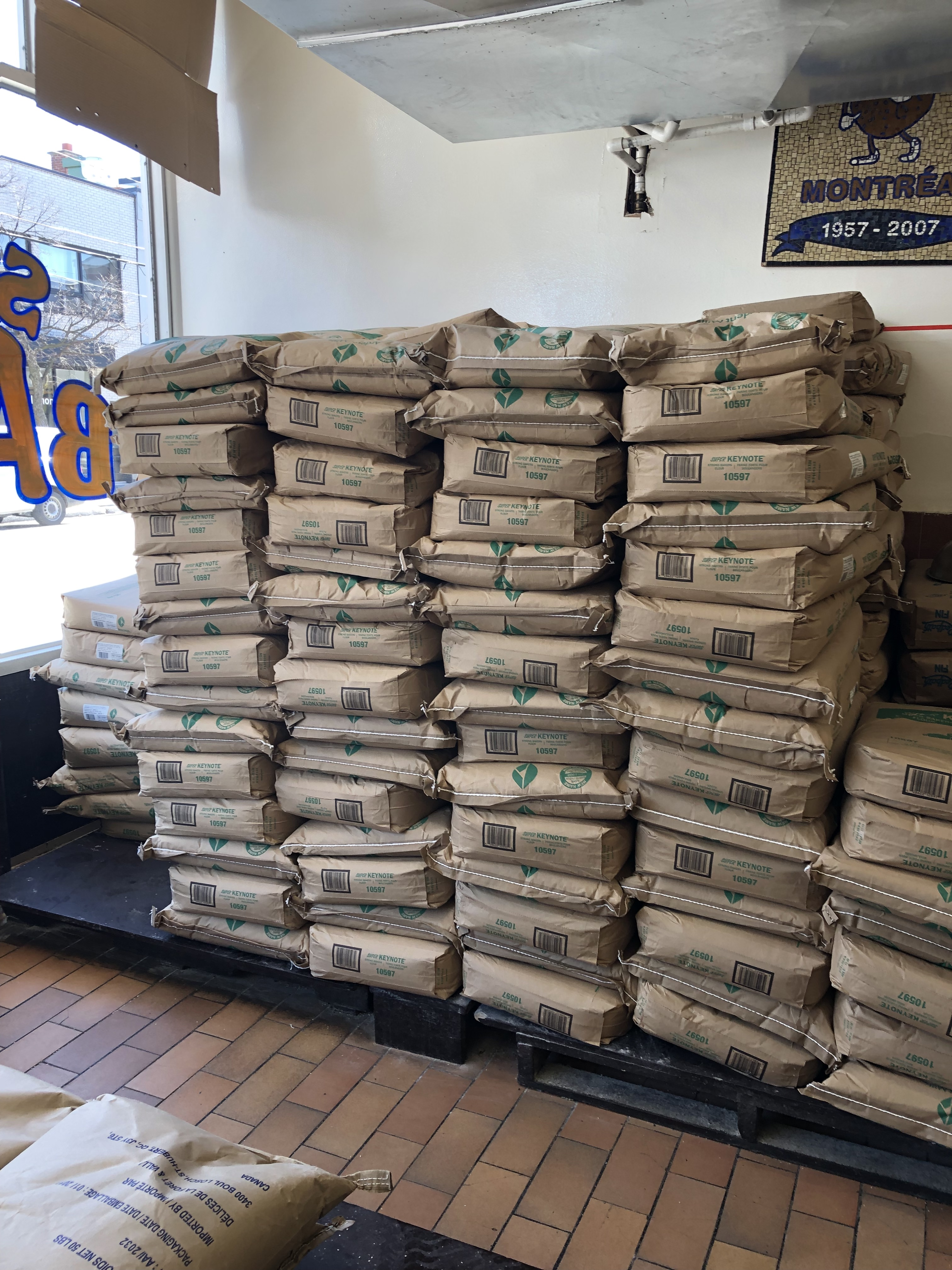
In the front of the bakery, by the window, piles of flour that are needed to make the bagels are displayed

=== Bagels ===
St-Viateur sells several varieties of Montreal-style bagels including: plain, sesame, poppy, all dressed, whole wheat, cinnamon & raisin, rosemary & sea salt, blueberry, pumpernickel and muesli. Their website provides nutritional information on each bagel including ingredients and allergens. Each bagel ranges between 200 and 240 calories per 2 servings (1 serving is listed as half of a bagel). An order of two dozen bagels is priced between $22 and $25CAD.

== Wholesale ==
Over the twentieth century, the bagel industry shifted from neighbourhood bakeries toward mass production and supermarket distribution. In addition to its retail locations, St-Viateur Bagel operates a wholesale business that supplies grocery stores. In 2015, co-owner Vince Morena said the company was shifting its focus toward the wholesale market and opening a production plant in Laval, where about 90 per cent of output would be sold to other provinces. He added that it had begun working with grocery chains such as Loblaws and Sobeys. By 2017, its bagels were sold in about 400 grocery stores across five provinces. The company has also operated bagel ovens inside several grocery stores and offers a wholesale partnership program to merchants in Canada and the United States. In 2016, it began shipping bagels to customers across North America. In May 2024, it began supplying 14 Central Market grocery stores in Texas. The first shipment was 1,200 dozen bagels, baked in Montreal and frozen for transport.

== In the media ==
The closing of the Monkland Village location of St-Viateur in March 2019 was widely reported across Montreal and National news outlets.

In 2018, the Globe and Mail published an article detailing how wood-burning businesses that are unable to meet emission bylaw requirements will be forced to switch to gas or electric. The article cited St-Viateur among other traditional bagels shops which would be directly impacted by this development. St-Viateur Bagel has since installed a filter to reduce emissions and comply with updated local emissions bylaws.

In 2020, St-Viateur Bagel was featured in an episode, season 3 episode 5, of the Netflix show Somebody Feed Phil.

St-Viateur Bagel gained international popularity in late 2025 and early 2026, after its logo T-shirt was seen in the season 1 episode 5 of Canadian TV series Heated Rivalry, worn by the character Rose Landry, who was portrayed by Sophie Nélisse.

== Collaborations ==
In October 2026, the Canadian apparel retailer Aritzia partnered with St-Viateur Bagel to mark the opening of its expanded flagship store on Rue Sainte-Catherine in downtown Montreal, which became Aritzia’s largest in Quebec. The partnership produced a limited-edition collection of co-branded clothing: a hooded sweatshirt, a crewneck sweatshirt and a T-shirt with St-Viateur Bagel graphics. The collection was released online in Canada on October 24, 2026, and became available in limited quantities at the Sainte-Catherine store when it opened on October 26.

== See also ==
- Historic Jewish Quarter, Montreal
- Monkland Avenue, location of a branch store
- Schwartz's
- Wilensky's
- Fairmount Bagel
