= Westman's Bagel & Coffee =

Restaurant chain in Seattle, Washington, U.S.

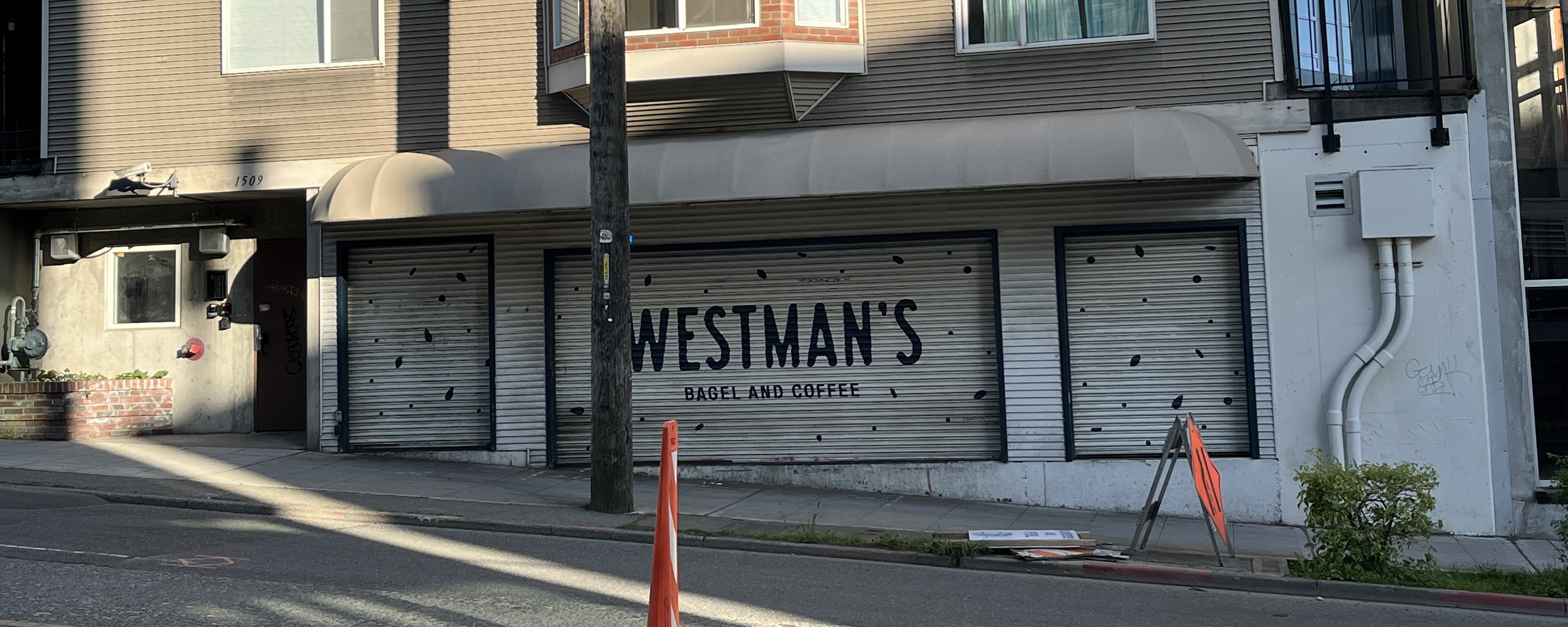
- The Capitol Hill location, 2023
- Interactive map of Westman's Bagel & Coffee

Restaurant information
- Established: January 19, 2018
- Owners: Monica Dimas; Molly Westman
- Chef: Monica Dimas; Molly Westman
- Location: 1509 East Madison Street, Seattle, King, Washington, 98122, United States
- Coordinates: 47.6146°N 122.3123°W
- Website: westmansbagel.com

Westman's Bagel & Coffee is a small chain of bagel and coffee shops in Seattle, in the U.S. state of Washington. Monica Dimas and Molly Westman opened a location on Capitol Hill in January 2018 and another in the University District in 2022. Westman's serves New York–style bagels as well as bialy, pastries, and sandwiches. The business has garnered a positive reception, specifically for its bagels and bacon, egg, and cheese sandwich.

== Description ==
Westman's Bagel & Coffee is a small woman-owned and Seattle-based chain of bagel and coffee shops, with locations on Capitol Hill and in the University District. The Capitol Hill location operates as a walkup counter on East Madison, in a space previously occupied by both Little Uncle and Manu's Bodegita next to the Bullitt Center. Karen Brooks of Portland Monthly said the location has a small outdoor diner with framed art and three stools.

=== Menu ===
The Seattle Times has described the business' New York–style bagels as "fat and dense, but with a good, tight honeycomb of very small air bubbles inside". Varieties include classic, cinnamon currant, "everything" with spices from Villa Jerada, jalapeño cheddar, Maldon Sea Salt, pumpernickel, and sesame, as well as seasonal options. Schmear varieties include Willapa Hills cream cheese in flavors such as dill and black pepper, honey and thyme, plain, smoked lox, and scallion, as well as caviar and vegan options.

Westman's also offers bialy and pastries such as black and white cookies, challah, chocolate rugelach, babka with Nutella, and brownies as well as chocolate chip cookies with tahini. Challah varieties include olive oil and fennel sea salt. Sandwich options include a bacon, egg, and cheese ("B.E.C.") on a "kaiser/dinner roll hybrid", an avocado bagel with pickled red onions and za'atar, and others with lox and whitefish. The University District location has also served a sandwich called The Brick Lane with corned beef, English mustard, and dill pickles.

Westman's serves espresso from Caffé Vita Coffee Roasting Company. The drink menu also includes carbonated water, ginger beer supplied by Rachel's Ginger Beer, juice, and tea.

== History ==
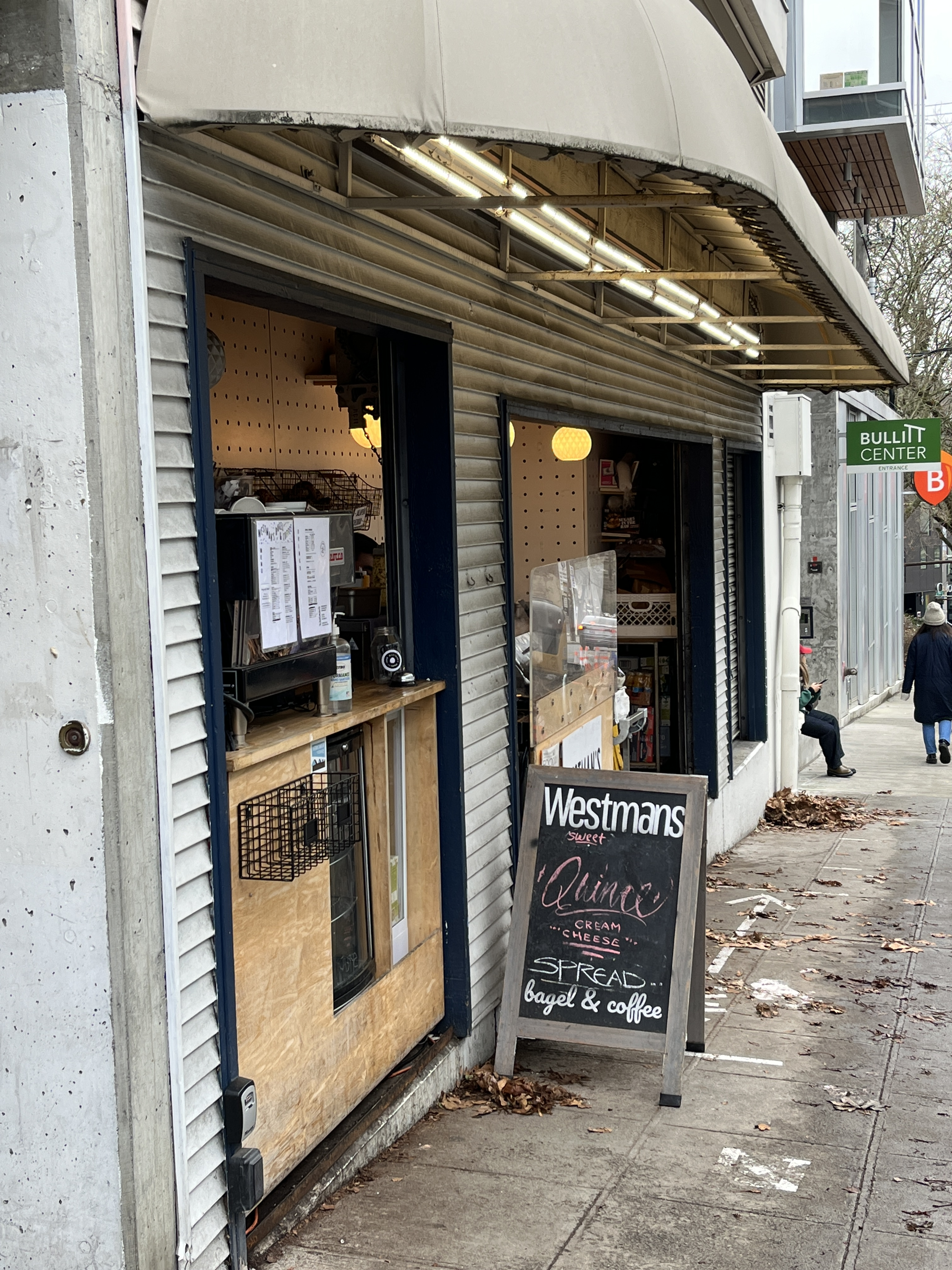
The location on Capitol Hill, 2022

Plans for Westman's were made public in 2017. Following a series of delays, Monica Dimas and Molly Westman opened Westman's on Capitol Hill on January 19, 2018, a few months later than the previously announced September launch. Eater Seattle's Megan Hill has described Dimas as a chef and Westman as a baker and "bagel expert" who previously worked at Macrina Bakery. The duo made two trips to New York to visit dozens of bagel shops, and Westman tested approximately 75 bagel recipes before opening.

In March 2018, Hill said business was "brisk", with bagels "occasionally selling out before closing time". Within a few months, the business began operating on weekends and plans were underway to open a second location. Between 2019 and 2021, media outlets described the business' plans to launch Cafe Westman's in Pioneer Square, with indoor seating and a larger menu, as well as Westman's Bakeshop in the Seward Park neighborhood. The locations did not come to fruition. Instead, a second location opened on University Way Northeast in the University District in 2022, in a space previously occupied by Urban Dinner Market. Westman's bakery operation moved from Capitol Hill to University District with the launch of the outpost.

In 2020, during the COVID-19 pandemic, Westman's offered "brunch boxes" for Mother's Day, which included plain and dill spreads, pickled onion and other toppings, nova lox (or vegan carrot lox), bagels, and cookies. Post Pike Cafe & Bar, which opened on Broadway East in December 2020, has been described as a "partner business" with Westman's. Post Pike Cafe & Bar offers bagels and bagel sandwiches made by Westman's.

== Reception ==
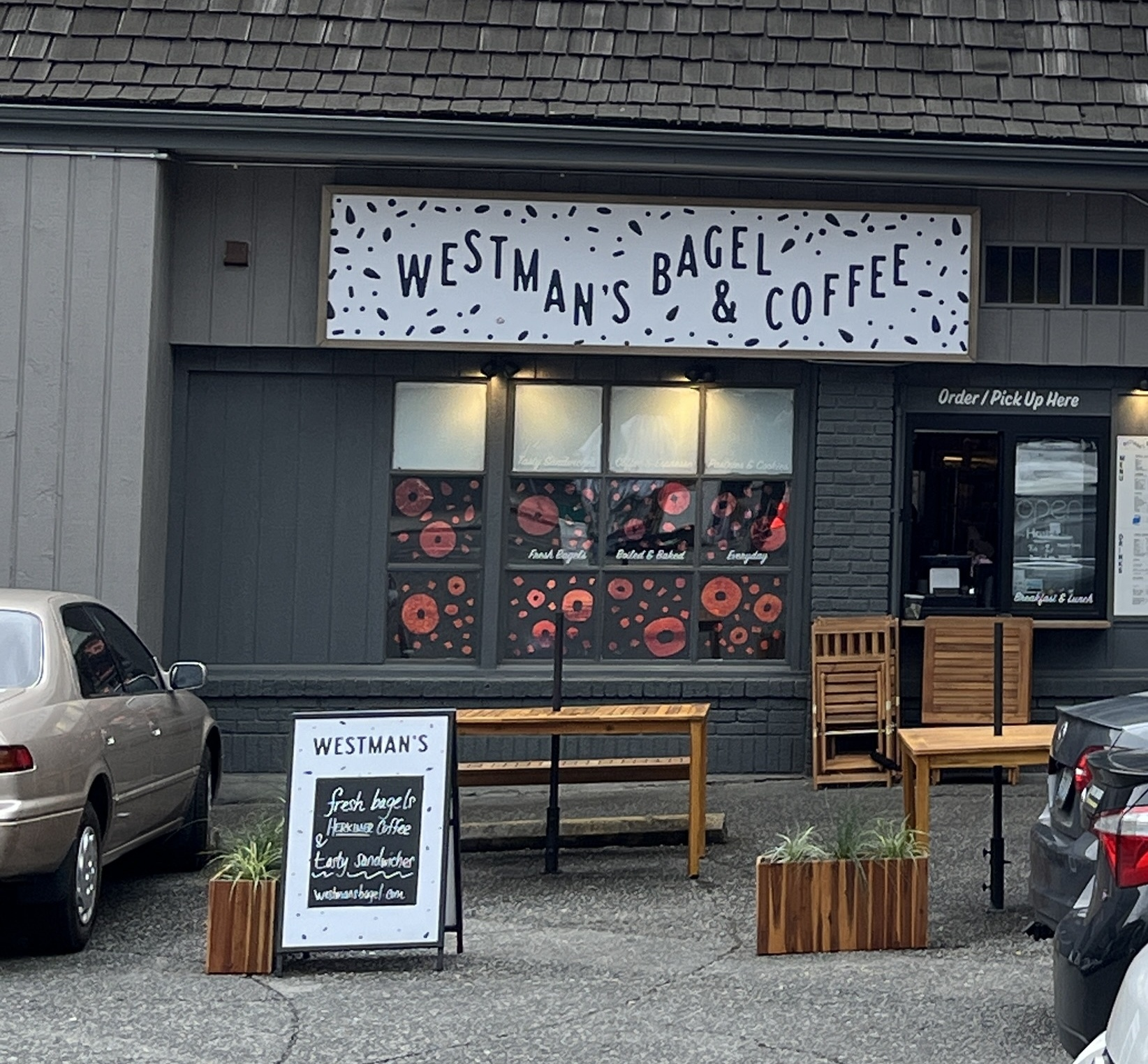
Exterior of the University District location in 2023

In February 2018, a food critic for The Seattle Times recommend an early visit as bagels may sell out by afternoon. Two months later, Megan Hill of Eater Seattle said the original location "has drawn crowds and frequently sold out of its New York–style bagels since opening". The website included Westman's in a 2022 list of breakfast sandwiches in the city "worth waking up early to get". In 2018, Chason Gordon of Seattle Weekly said the bagels "possess the power to silence the shrill complaints of ex-New Yorkers", and Naomi Tomky included Westman's in The Stranger's overview of "favorite" eateries for Jewish and Israeli cuisine. Tomky wrote, "Plump but not oversized, amply schmeared with the house-made cream cheese (from local dairy, natch), the bagels live up to the exemplars of the East Coast, and opined that although she praised the shop's menu, she stated that the long lines may hinder the business.

In 2018, Chelsea Lin of Seattle Magazine said the bagels were "head and shoulders above the local competition for their chewiness" and recommended the B.E.C. with hot sauce. She wrote that it was the best breakfast sandwich in Seattle, noting its inspiration from New York. Lin also included the B.E.C. in a 2018 list of new Seattle restaurants "doing one thing and doing it well", in which she said no other bagel shops in Seattle "so closely resemble that East Coast staple—and, perhaps more importantly, the bacon, egg and cheese sandwiches—than this cheery Capitol Hill walk-up." She and Tomky included the B.E.C. in the magazine's 2019 "dining bucket list" and overview of the city's 15 best breakfasts. Tomky included Westman's in Time Out Seattle's 2021 list of the city's twelve best eateries for breakfast.

Aimee Rizzo of The Infatuation said Westman's bagels '[didn't] quite succeed' at replicating a NYC bagel. In 2020, the Seattle Post-Intelligencer's Christina Ausley called the Capitol Hill location a "famed neighborhood hub" with "mean" bagel sandwiches that has garnered a positive reputation among Seattleites.

== See also ==
- List of bakeries
- List of coffeehouse chains
- List of restaurant chains in the United States
