= Donald Bell =

Donald Bell may refer to:

- Donald Simpson Bell (1890–1916), English school teacher and professional footballer
- Donald Bell (German journalist) (1901–1978), pseudonym of German journalist Hermann Budzislawski
- Donald Bell (bass-baritone) (born 1934), Canadian bass-baritone
- Donald Bell (writer) (1937–2003), Canadian journalist and writer

== See also ==
- Donald Lynden-Bell (1935–2018), British astrophysicist
- Donald Dell (born 1938), American former tennis player
