= Fairmount Bagel =

Bakery in Montreal, Quebec

Coordinates: 45.5229°N 73.5952°W

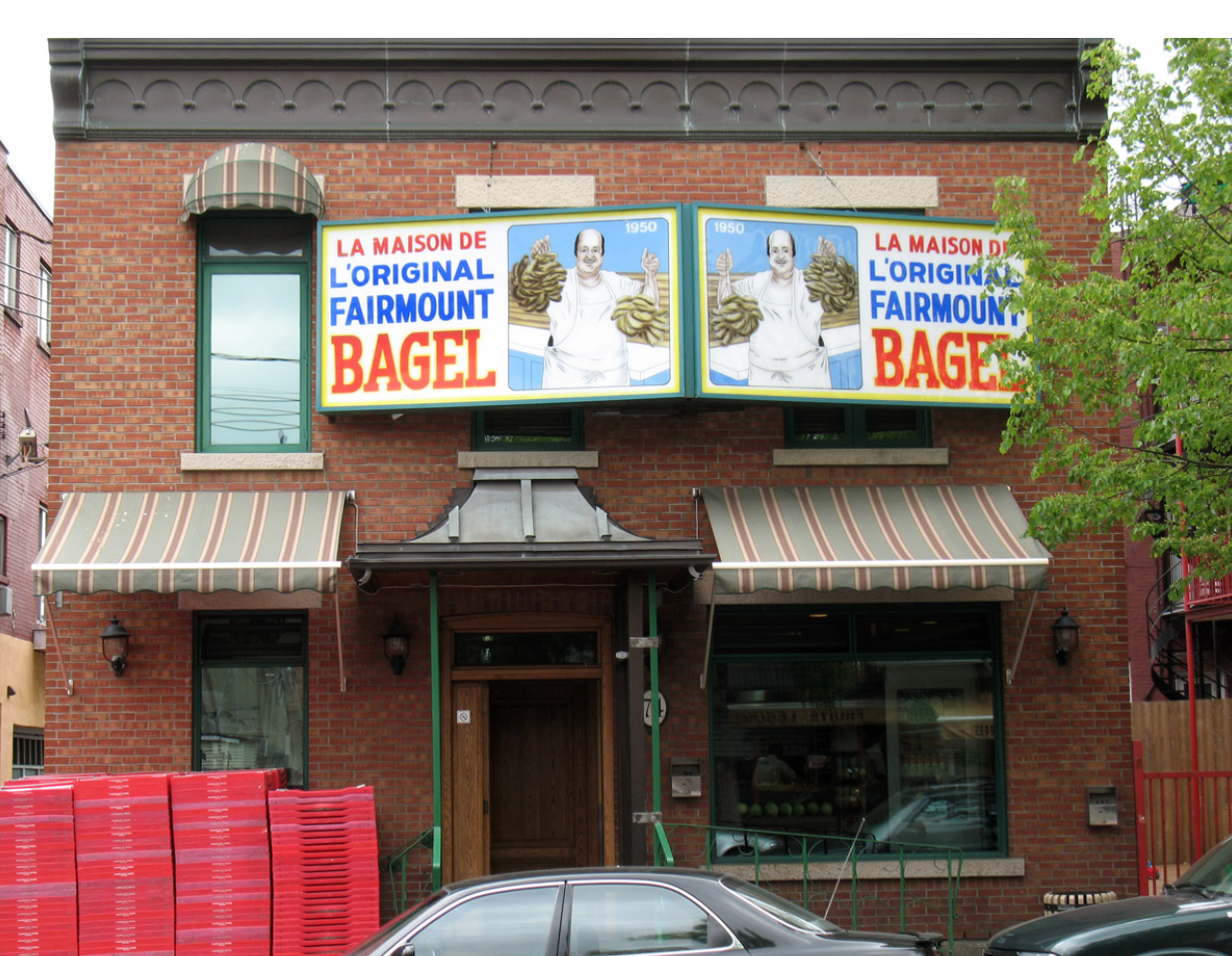
Fairmount Bagel Storefront In Montreal

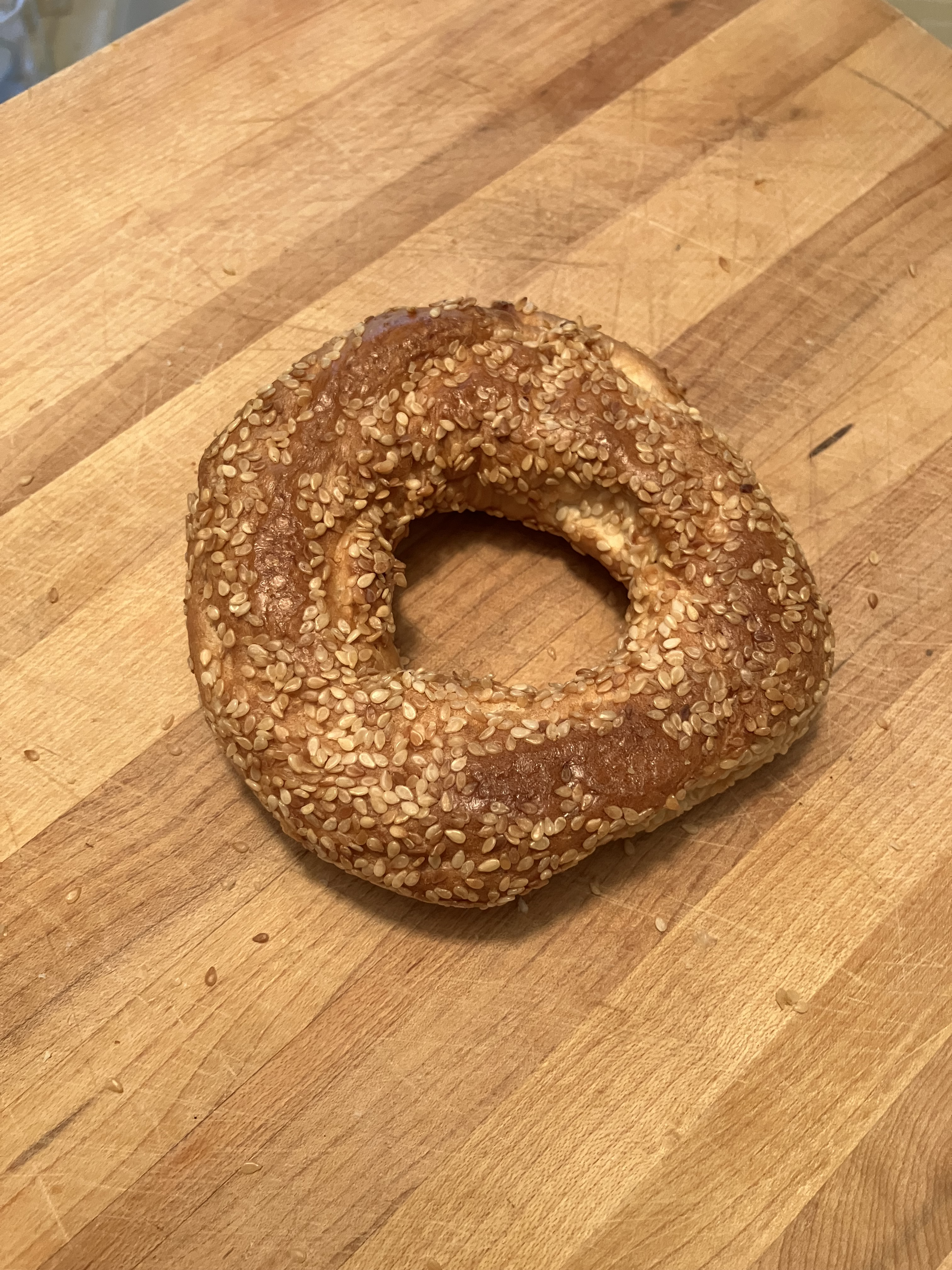
A Fairmount Bagel

Fairmount Bagel is a Montreal-style bagel bakery in Montreal, Quebec, Canada, in the Mile End neighbourhood of the Plateau-Mont-Royal borough. The first location opened on September 7, 1919, on Saint-Laurent Boulevard by Isadore Shlafman. The current location, on 74 Fairmount Avenue West was opened in 1949. Fairmount Bagel remains a family-run business.

== History ==
=== Bagels in Montreal ===
Jewish immigrants from Eastern Europe, specifically Poland, introduced the Montreal bagel to North America. Originally, the "beugel" was a traditional gift, first, to the King of Poland, John III Sobieski, then more commonly to new mothers. From here, the bagel ended up being sold in the city streets of Russia and was called "bublik". In the first half of the 20th century, after being brought to North America, these bagels were almost exclusively made and sold within the Montreal Jewish communities. In the 1970s, the Montreal bagel gained popularity on the other side of the Canadian border and were mass-produced to supply this demand.

=== Fairmount Bakery ===
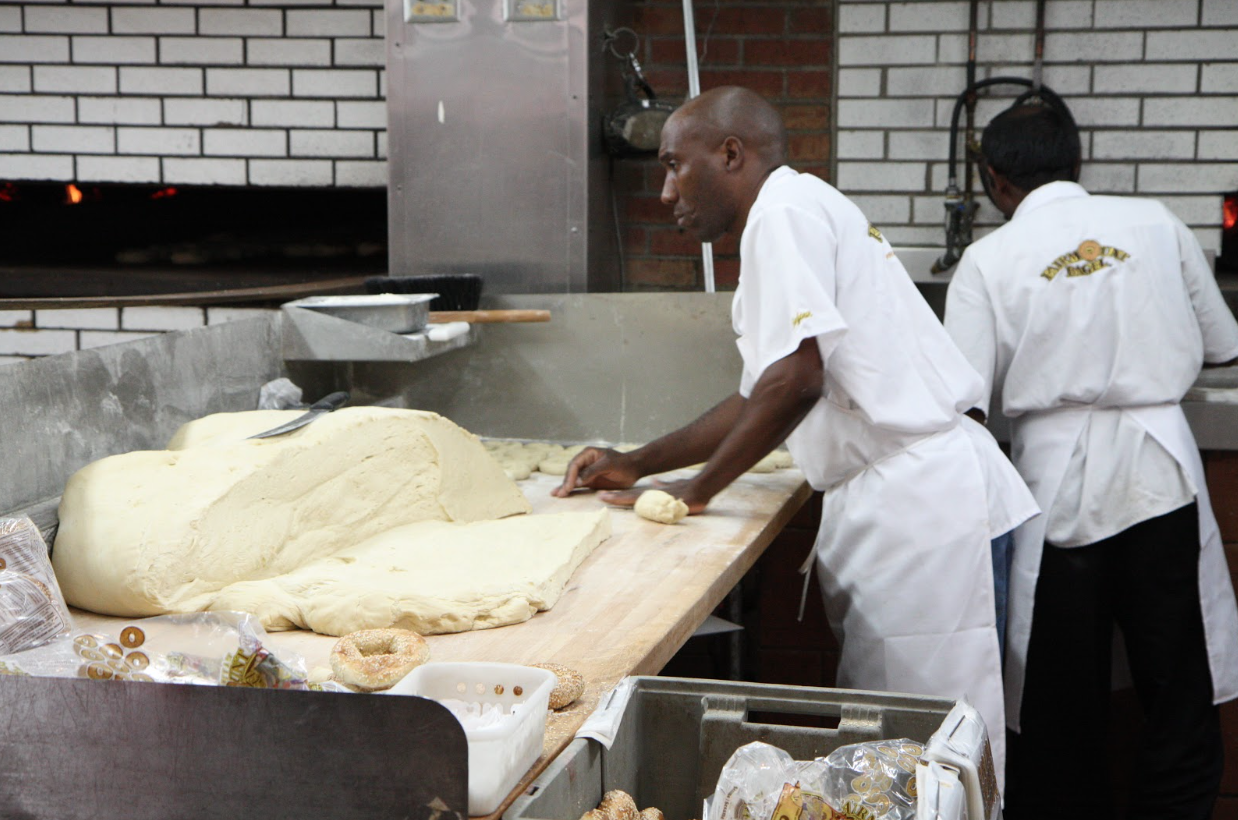
Part of the bakery's production process

Fairmount Bagel was the first bagel bakery of its kind in Montreal. Isadore Shlafman, known as Grandfather Isadore, moved from Russia to Canada, and opened the bakery – originally called the Montreal Bagel Bakery – in 1919 on Saint-Laurent Boulevard. In 1949, Isadore moved from the Saint-Laurent location to a cottage on Fairmount Avenue. The bakery was situated on the first floor and the family lived upstairs. The Shlafman family changed the name, to reflect the new location, to "The Original Fairmount Bagel Bakery". Since the opening, Fairmount Bagel has remained a family-run business. Grandfather Isadore passed the business down to his son Jack Shlafman, who then passed it to his son, Irwin Shlafman.

== Products ==
Montreal-style bagels are smaller, less chewy, and sweeter than the New York style bagel. The former is also made with honey and malt syrup. The process of making this baked good consists of hand-rolling and then submerging the bagel dough in boiling water for roughly 3 minutes, then baking it in a wood-fired oven for 20 minutes.

At Fairmount, sesame bagels make up 70 percent of their sales. Nonetheless, the company has a range of fresh products. The store sells several "schmears", such as tubs of cream cheese, for customers to apply to their bagels.

== Media and news ==
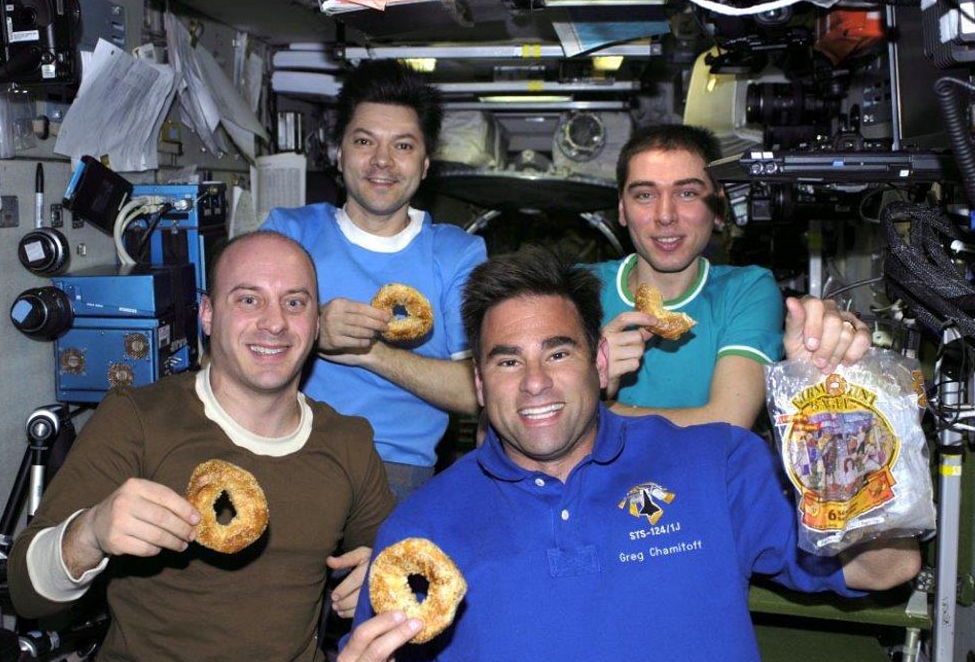
Greg Chamitoff and colleagues with Fairmount Bagels aboard the International Space Station

=== Fairmount Bagels in space ===
In May 2008, Astronaut Greg Chamitoff, the nephew of the owner of the store, took products from Fairmount Bakery with him on a mission, STS-124, to the International Space Station.

=== Future of wood-fired ovens ===
There was concern that new environmental laws would lead to the outlawing of the wood-burning ovens that contribute to the character of the Montreal bagel. However, existing ovens have been grandfathered under the new legislation and are safe for now.

=== Documentary about Fairmount Bagel ===
Filmmakers Jonathan Keijser, from Halifax, and Daniel Beresh, from Edmonton, who spent time in Montreal pursuing musical-theatre projects, created a documentary about Fairmount Bagel, "Bagels in the Blood".

=== Daniel Schlafman murder-suicide ===
In November 2021, Daniel Schlafman, son of owner Irwin Schlafman, brutally murdered a 25-year-old sex worker before taking his own life. Despite calls by a local sex worker rights organization for the tragedy to garner more attention and serve as a catalyst for change, the family made no mention of the incident in Daniel Schlafman's obituary and his memorial fund was used to plant trees in his honour.

== See also ==
- Historic Jewish Quarter, Montreal
- List of Ashkenazi Jewish restaurants
- List of bakeries
- Schwartz's
- Wilensky's
- St-Viateur Bagel
