= M0851 =

Company

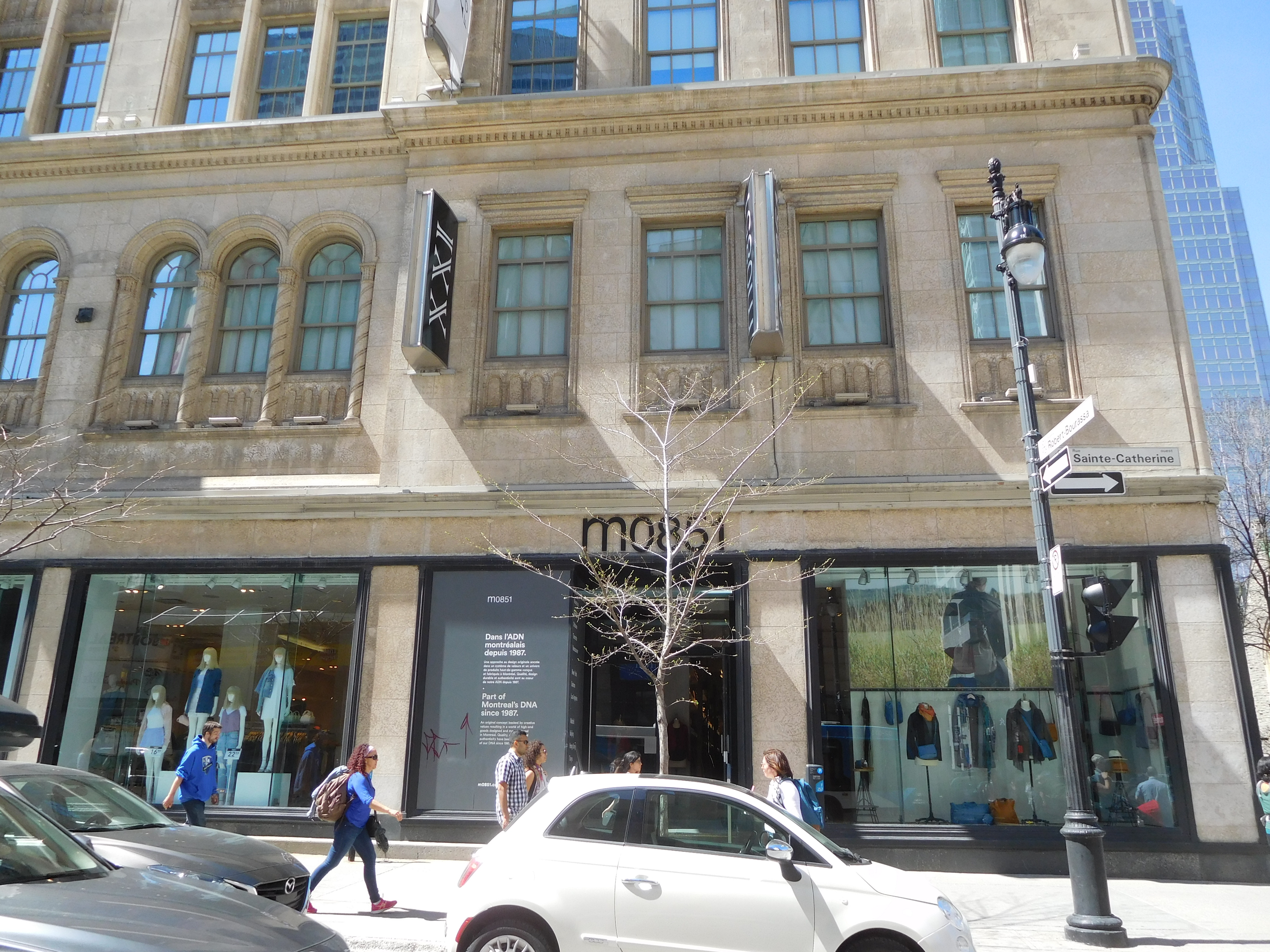
Store in Montreal Eaton Centre

m0851 is a Montreal-based company founded in 1987 by Frédéric Mamarbachi, which designs and manufactures leather bags and accessories, leather jackets, and four-season outerwear.

== History ==
Founded by Frédéric Mamarbachi in Montreal in 1987 under the name Rugby North America, the company started out manufacturing leather belts. Mamarbachi's daughter Faye served as VP of Sales and Marketing.

In 2003, Rugby changed its name to m0851 to better reflect its brand and to enable international Trademark protection in many countries where rugby is a popular sport. The name m0851 comes from the first letter of the founder’s last name and the month and year of his birth.

In 1987, the brand opened its first retail location in Montreal, on Saint-Laurent Boulevard, followed by its first US location in Soho, New York City, on Mercer Street. The company's head office is located in Montreal’s Mile End district, a neighborhood with a history in the garment industry.

== Products ==
m0851’s body of work includes architectural spaces, product design, and furniture. In addition to their products, m0851 also fully designs their retail stores.

All m0851 products are designed in Montreal. The majority of the company's products, such as bags, accessories and clothing, are crafted in their Montreal workshops. The company subscribes to the idea that local production allows for better quality control at all levels.

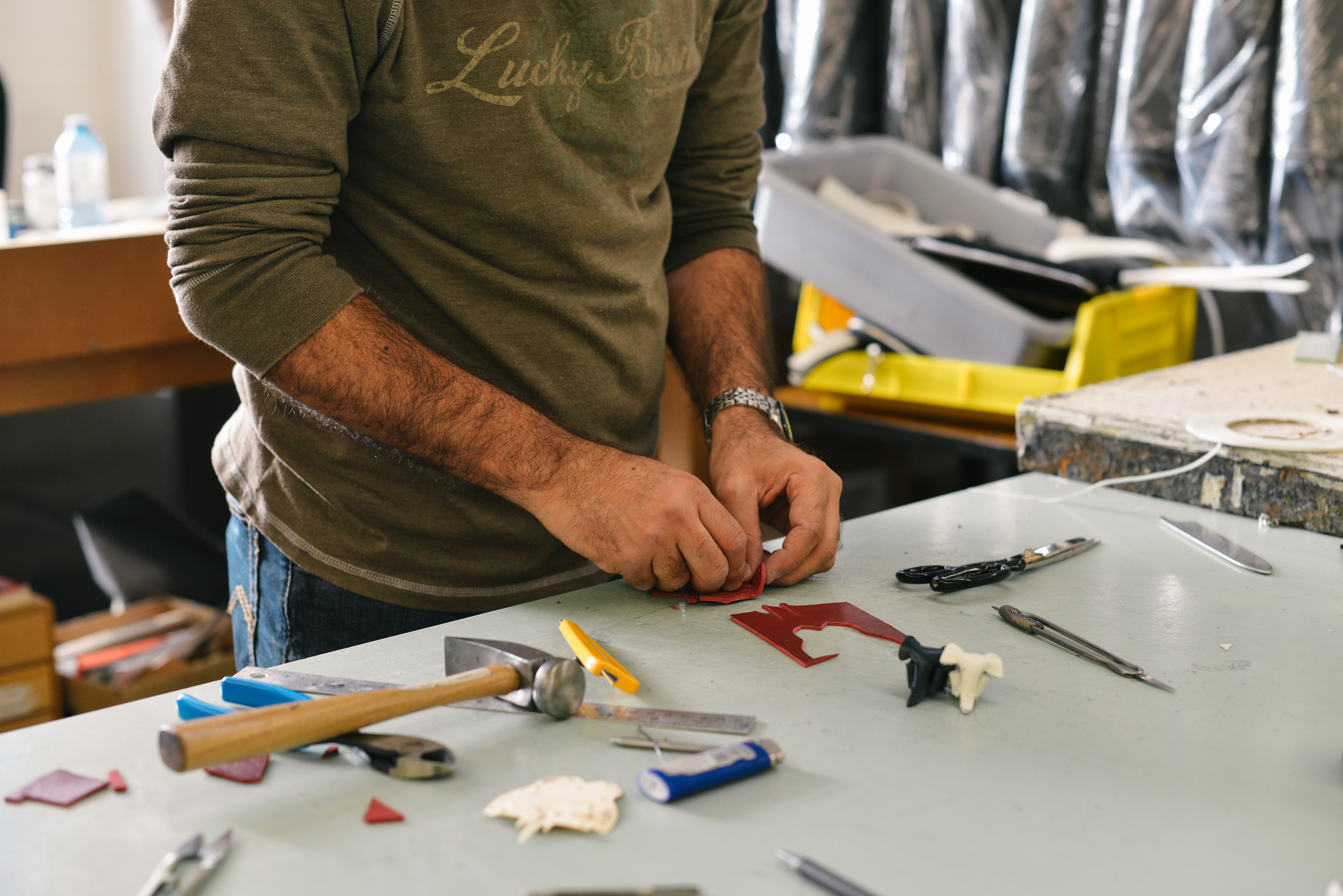

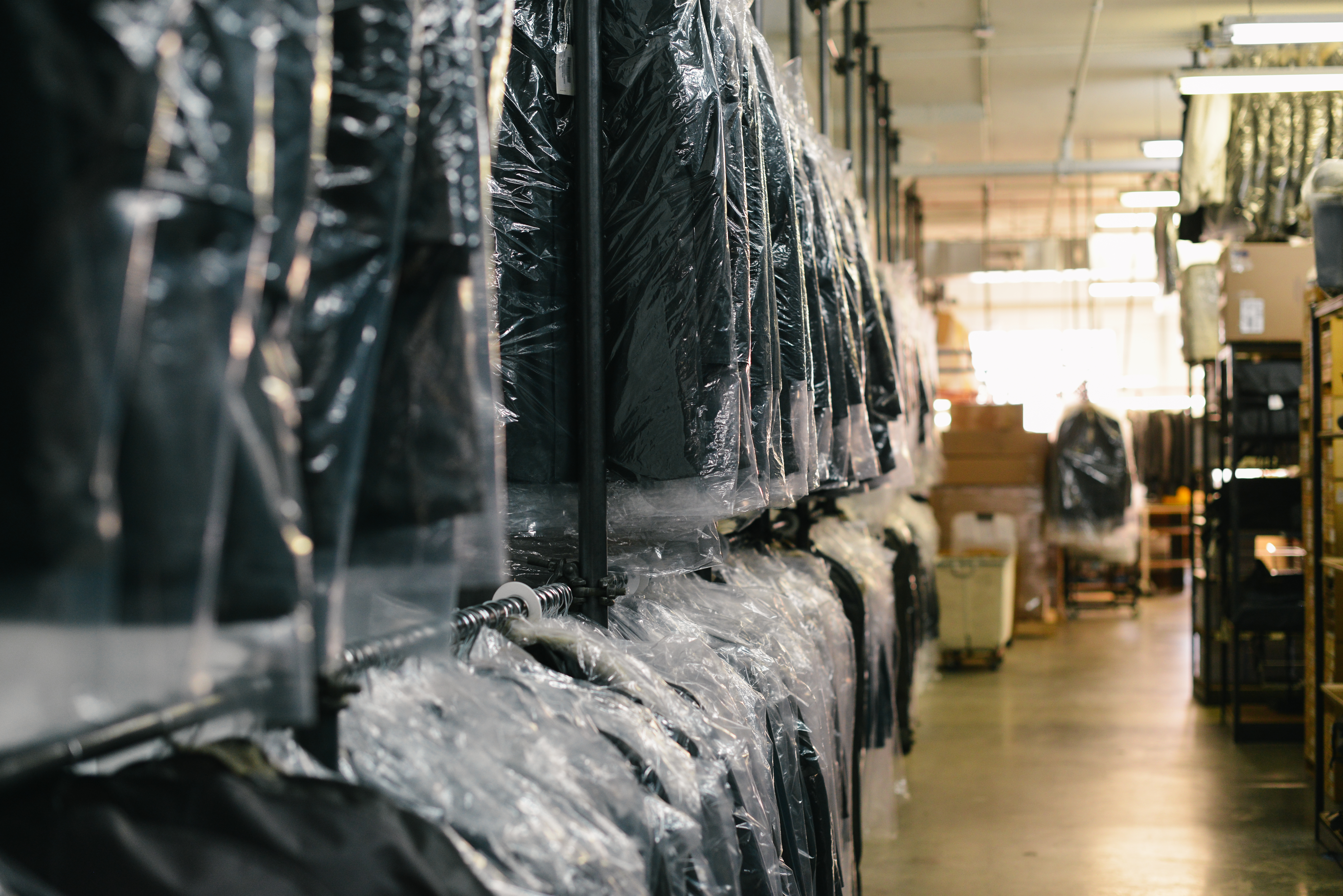

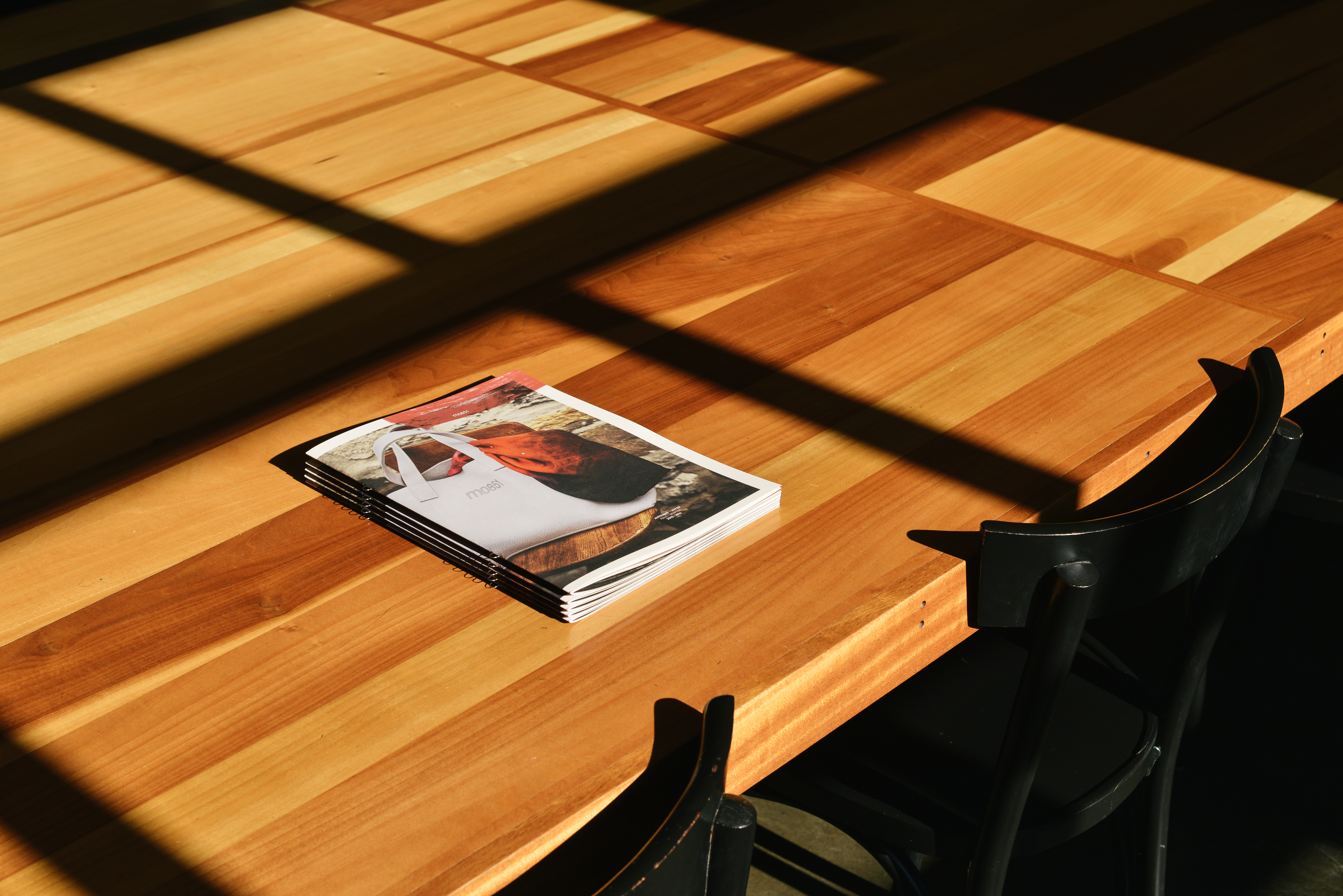
