= Georgetown Bagelry =

Bagel bakery in Bethesda, Maryland, U.S.

- Interactive map of Georgetown Bagelry

Restaurant information
- Established: August 15, 1981 in Washington, D.C., United States
- Owner: Mary Beall Adler
- Previous owner: Eric Koefoed
- Food type: Bagels
- Location: 5227 River Road, Bethesda, Maryland, 20816, United States
- Coordinates: 38°57′55″N 77°6′14″W
- Website: www.georgetownbagelry.com

Georgetown Bagelry is a bagel bakery in Bethesda, Maryland, United States. It originally opened in 1981 in Georgetown, Washington, D.C. For several years, it was voted by the Washington City Paper as having the best bagels in the Washington metropolitan area. The company specializes in New York–style bagels which are made by boiling dough.

== History ==
27-year-old Erik Koefoed dropped out of Cornell University and founded Georgetown Bagelry, which opened on August 15, 1981 at 3245 M Street NW in Georgetown, Washington, D.C. At the time, there was only one other bakery in the D.C. area making New York–style bagels. While at Cornell, Koefoed had learned to make New York–style bagels during the day and studied music at night. After visiting Washington in January 1980 and being unimpressed by its bagels, he was inspired to open his own bakery there.

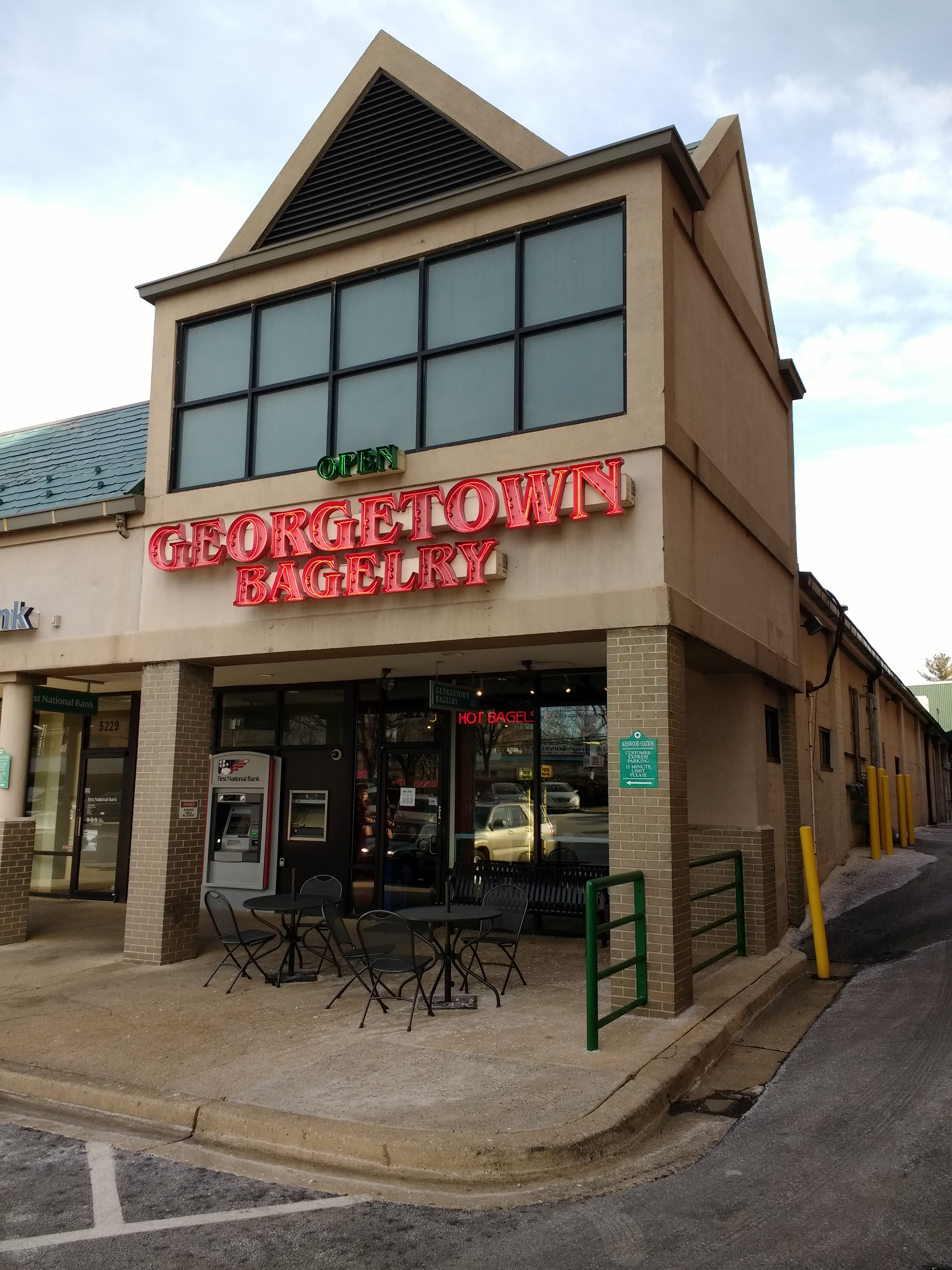
Georgetown Bagelry in Bethesda, Maryland

The business was not doing well in the late 1980s, and Mary Beall Adler took over the bakery and moved it to 5227 River Road in Bethesda, Maryland. She has been the owner of Georgetown Bagelry since 1991.

Around 2007, the Georgetown location was sold to other owners, who were permitted to continue using the name. It closed in March 2008. In 2014, Georgetown Bagelry was named to Mashable's List of "32 Small Businesses Killing it on Social". in 2013, Beall wrote a book about her experience running the company.

=== New York–style bagels ===
The process for making this style of bagel involves putting them into a boiling kettle of water for approximately 15 to 40 seconds. There is a shiny glaze found in New York bagels and that comes from the boiling. The dough is prepared the night before so that the yeast will cause the dough to rise.

== Bibliography ==
- Adler, Mary Beall (2013). Who Scooped My Bagel?. Charleston, South Carolina: Advantage Media Group. ISBN 978-159932-382-4.
