= Kettleman's Bagel Co. =

Canadian bakery

Kettlemans Bagel
- Type: Privately owned
- Industry: Fast food
- Founded: 1993; 33 years ago
- Founder: Joe Bianchini; Craig Buckley
- Headquarters: 912 Bank Street; Ottawa, Ontario; K1S 3W4,
- Number of locations: 8
- Key people: Craig Buckley (co-Owner, 1993-present); Joe Bianchini (co-Owner, 1993-2014)
- Products: Bagels, Sandwiches, Salads, and Baked treats
- Website: www.kettlemansbagels.ca

Kettlemans Bagel is a privately owned Montreal-style bagel bakery started in 1993. The company is based in Ottawa, Ontario, Canada. The bagels are made by rolling, kettling and baking traditional Montreal style bagels in a wood-burning oven.

The bagel shop operates 24 hours a day, 7 days a week.

While known for its bagels, the company is also known for its sandwiches and spreads.

== History ==
Kettlemans Bagel was established in 1993 by co-Founders Joe Bianchini and Craig Buckley.
