= Montreal-style bagel =

Variety of bagel created by Jewish immigrants in Quebec

Montreal-style bagel.
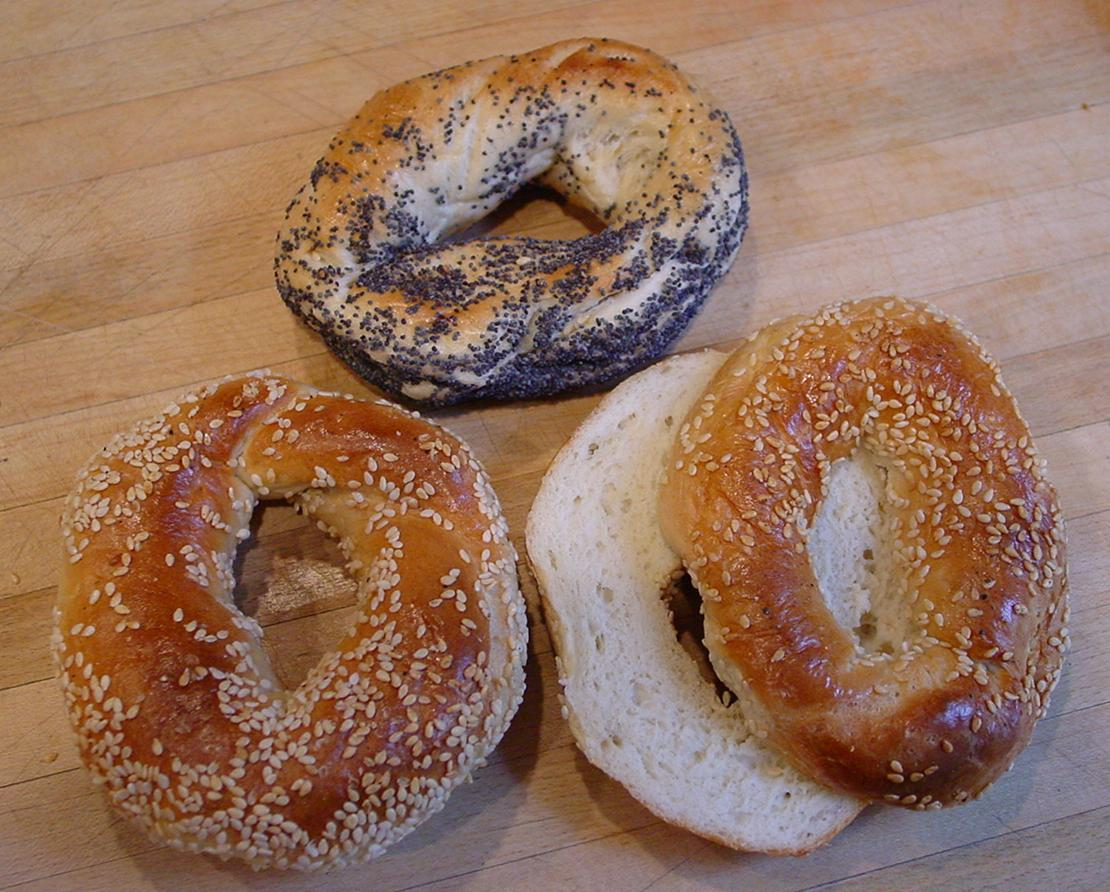
- Poppy seed (dark) and sesame seed (light) Montreal-style bagels
- Type: Bagel
- Place of origin: Canada
- Region or state: Montreal, Quebec
- Main ingredients: Flour, malt, eggs, honey

The Montreal-style bagel or Montreal bagel (sometimes beigel; Yiddish: בײגל, romanized: beygl; French: Bagel de Montréal) is a distinctive variety of handmade and wood-fired baked bagel. In contrast to the New York-style bagel, the Montreal bagel is smaller, thinner, sweeter, and denser, with a larger hole, and is always baked in a wood-fired oven. It contains malt, egg, and no salt, and is boiled in honey-sweetened water before being baked.

In some Montreal establishments, bagels are still produced by hand and baked in full view of the patrons. There are two predominant varieties: black seed (poppy seed) or white seed (sesame seed).

== History ==
Montreal bagels, like the similarly shaped New York bagel, were brought to North America by Jewish immigrants from Poland and other Eastern European countries; the differences in texture and taste reflect the style of the particular area in Poland in which the immigrant bakers learned their trade. Minor controversy surrounds the question of who first brought the bagel to Montreal. They were (reportedly) first baked in Montreal by Chaim (Hyman) Seligman, as verified by Montreal historian Joe King, a historian of Montreal Jewry. Seligman first worked in the neighbourhood community of Lachine and later moved his bakery to the lane next door to Schwartz's Delicatessen on Boulevard St. Laurent in central Montreal. Seligman would string his bagels into dozens and patrol Jewish Main purveying his wares, originally with a pushcart, then a horse and wagon, and still later from a converted taxi. Seligman went into partnership with Myer Lewkowicz and with Jack Shlafman but fell out with both of them. Seligman and Lewkowicz founded the St. Viateur Bagel Shop in 1957 and Shlafman established Fairmount Bagel in 1919, which both still exist in the present day.

== Dissemination ==
A substantial proportion of Montreal's English-speaking Jewish community gradually left for other locales. Catering to this population, Montreal-style bagel shops have opened in Dartmouth, Nova Scotia, Vancouver, Ottawa, Toronto, Hamilton, Calgary, Winnipeg, Whitehorse, and other Canadian cities. They have even spread to the UK and some US cities, such as Burlington, Houston, Los Angeles, Oakland, Portland, and Seattle. For a time, this style of bagel was almost completely unknown in the northeastern U.S., mainly due to the proximity of the rival New York City bagel. (with one exception having been in Burlington, Vermont, where Myer's Bagels boasts a Montreal-style wood-fired oven and Lloyd Squires, a former St-Viateur Bagel Shop baker). At one point in New York City there were two Montreal-style bagel locations in the borough of Brooklyn within four blocks of each other, but one is now closed and the other no longer offers Montreal-style bagels.

Montreal-style bagels are currently the only style of bagel known to have ventured into space. Gregory Chamitoff, who grew up in Montreal, took three bags of sesame bagels with him on his assignments to STS-124 as passenger and ISS Expedition 17 as crewmember.

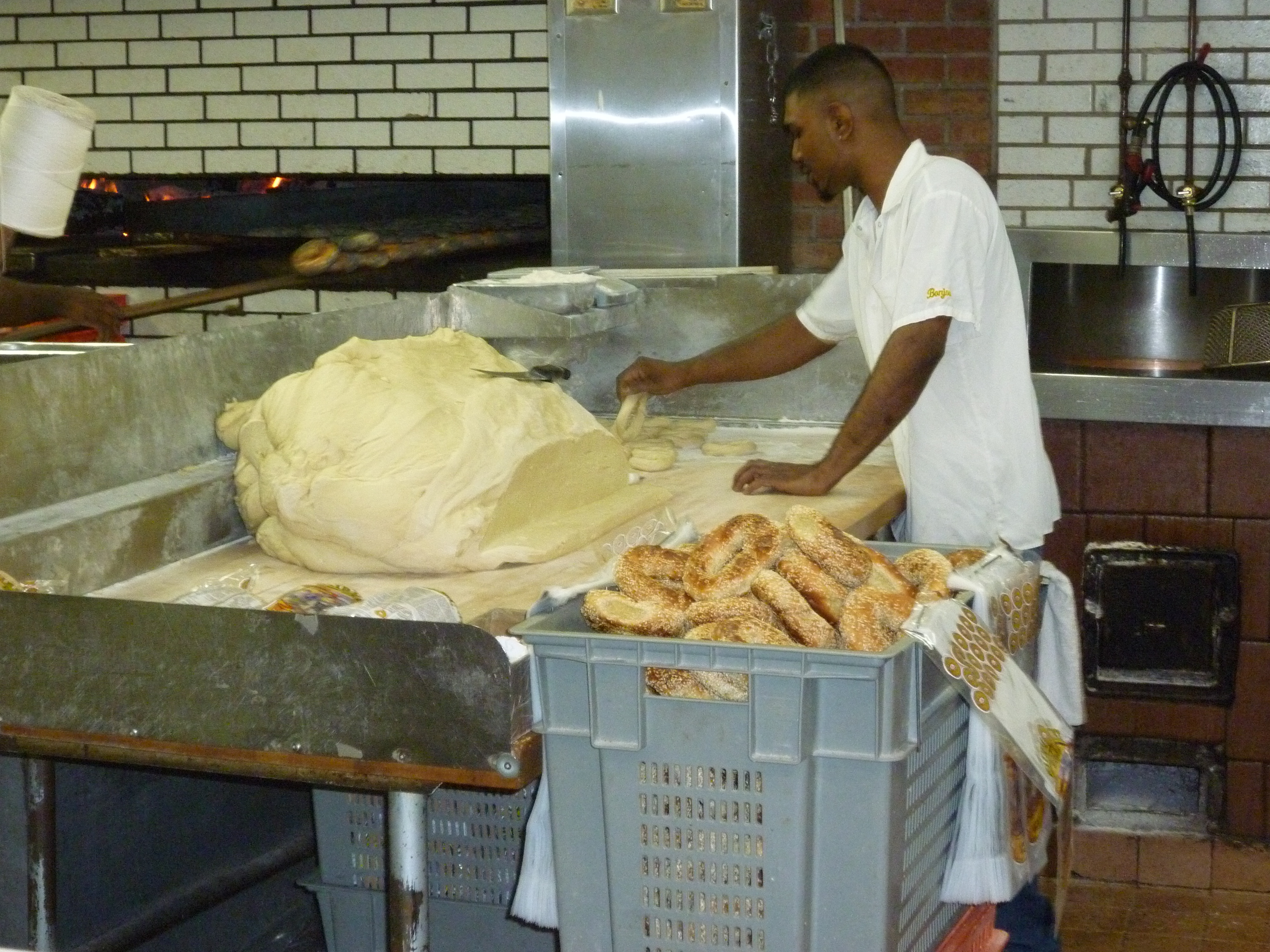
Fairmount Bagel – A loaf of bagel dough that is ready to be rolled and prepared

== Production ==
Montreal-style bagels are, for the most part, manufactured by the same method used to produce a generic bagel. The Montreal-style method of making bagels builds on the basic traditional method in the following ways:

- The basic bagel dough recipe includes egg and honey.
- Honey is also added to the water used for poaching the bagels before baking.
- The authentic Montreal-style bagels are baked in a wood-fired oven.

== Notable bagel shops ==
Several Montreal bagel factories produce authentic Montreal-style bagels. The two most prominent bagel shops in Montreal are St-Viateur Bagel and Fairmount Bagel. Both claim to be the oldest bagel shop in the city.

== See also ==
- Cuisine of Quebec
- Bublik
- Donald Bell
- Kettleman's Bagel Co.
- Mile End, Montreal
- Montreal-style smoked meat
- Urban culture
