= Wilensky's =

Wilensky's Light Lunch
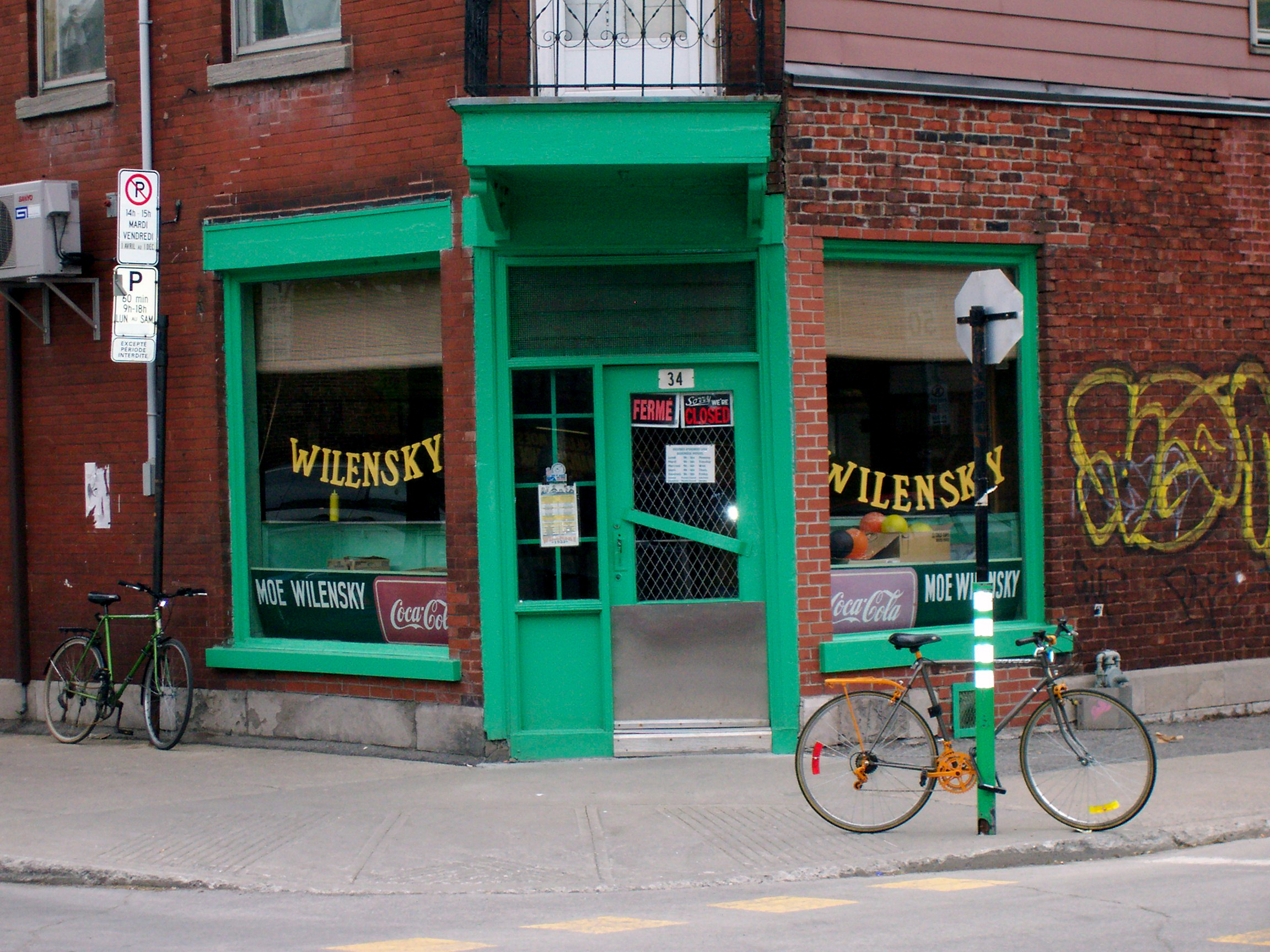
- Wilensky's storefront

- Location within Montreal

Restaurant information
- Established: May 15, 1932 (age 94)
- Food type: Lunch counter and soda fountain
- Dress code: Casual
- Location: 34 Fairmount Avenue West, Montreal, Quebec, H2T 2M1, Canada
- Coordinates: 45.523302°N 73.594932°W
- Website: wilenskys.com

Wilensky's Light Lunch, also known as Wilensky's, is a kosher-style lunch counter located on Fairmount Avenue West in Montreal, Quebec, Canada. Opened in 1932 by Moe Wilensky, the restaurant is widely believed to have inspired scenes in Mordecai Richler's novel, The Apprenticeship of Duddy Kravitz as either Eddy's Cigar & Soda or Moe's Cigar Store. Scenes in the film version of the book were shot in the restaurant.

== Products ==
Wilensky's is most famous for its Special: a grilled salami-from-beef and bologna-from-beef sandwich with mustard on a kaiser roll, pressed flat from the grill — mustard is compulsory, as a sign in the restaurant announces. Though recognized as part of Montreal's Jewish community, the restaurant is not kosher. Their soda pop drinks are still mixed by hand and their syrups, used in both regular soda and in egg creams, are homemade.

== History ==
Originally called Wilensky's Cigar Store, the restaurant was located at the corner of St. Urbain Street and Fairmount Avenue in Montreal's Mile End district. It moved to its current location in 1952 and was run by the founder's widow Ruth Wilensky (until 2012), his son Asher, daughter Sharon and granddaughter Alisa.

=== Wilensky's Special ===
The famous Wilensky's special sandwich is a grilled bologna sandwich. It was included in Travel + Leisure magazine's May 2012 edition's article about the 'Best Sandwiches From Around the World', written by Jonathan Gold. It was also featured in the second episode of David Chang and Anthony Bourdain's PBS series The Mind of a Chef, with Bourdain visiting again for another Wilensky's special as part of the Quebec episode of Parts Unknown.

== Gallery ==
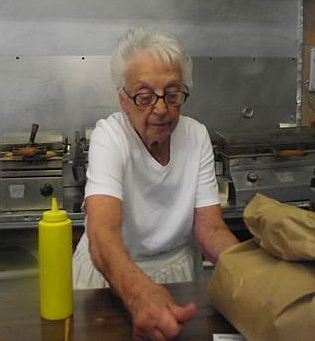
Ruth Wilensky

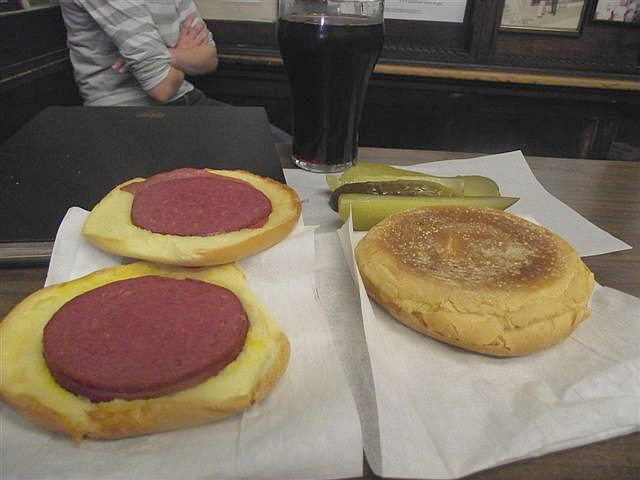
Two opened Wilensky's Specials, a dill pickle, and a cherry coke

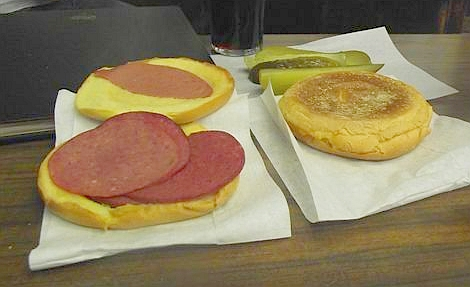
Sandwich with beef salami and bologna

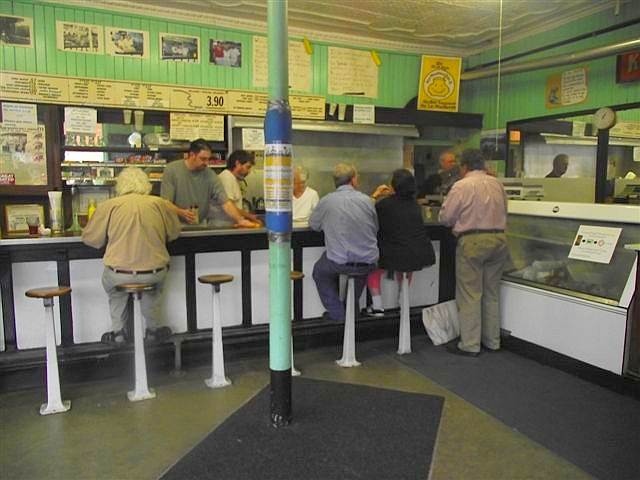
Wilensky's interior with back wall

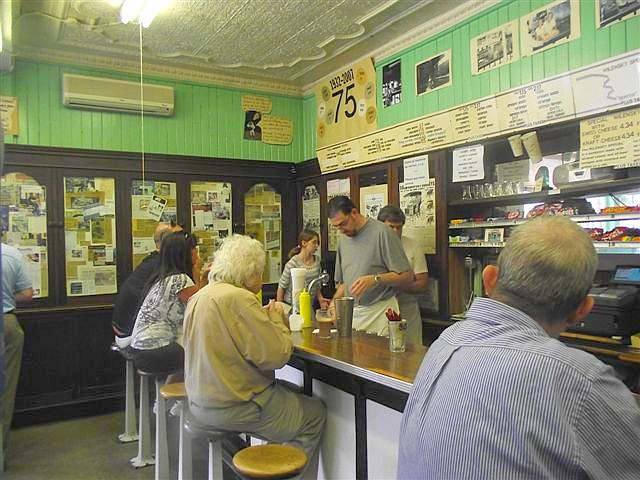
Wilensky's interior with side wall

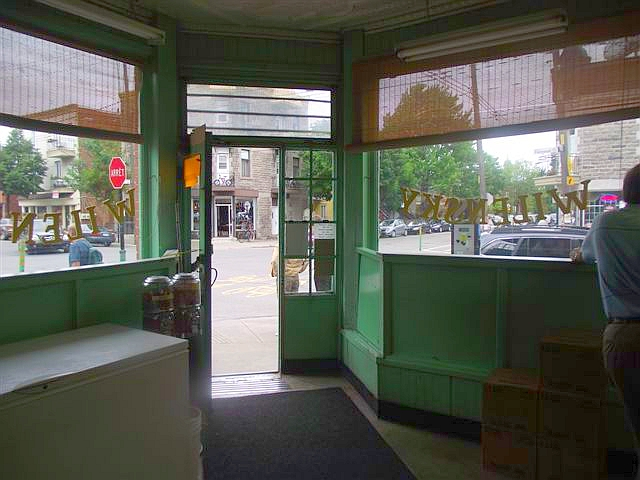
Wilensky's entryway

== See also ==
- Fairmount Bagel
- Historic Jewish Quarter, Montreal
- List of Ashkenazi Jewish restaurants
- List of delicatessens
