= Mile End, Montreal =

Mile End
- Neighbourhood
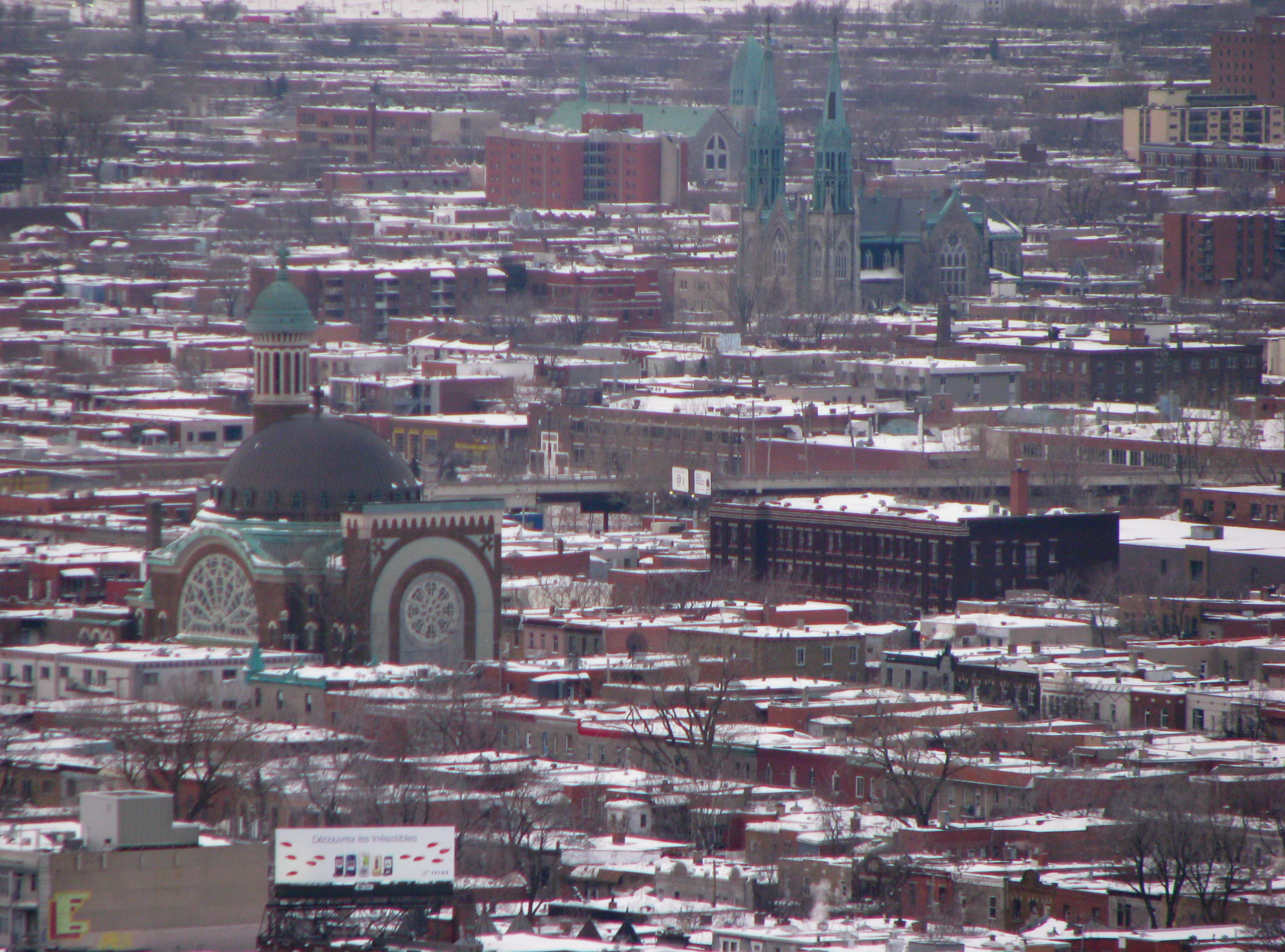
- Mile End seen from Mount Royal

- Location of Mile End in Montreal
- Coordinates: 45.525°N 73.583333°W
- Country: Canada
- Province: Quebec
- City: Montreal
- Borough: Le Plateau-Mont-Royal
- Postal Code: H2T, H2V
- Area codes: 514, 438

Mile End is a neighbourhood and municipal electoral district in the city of Montreal, Quebec, Canada. It is located in the city’s Plateau-Mont-Royal borough.

== Description ==
Since the 1980s Mile End has been known for its culture as an artistic neighbourhood, home to artists, musicians, writers, and filmmakers such as Arcade Fire, Bran Van 3000, Godspeed You! Black Emperor, Ariane Moffatt, Grimes, Plants and Animals, Wolf Parade and Mac Demarco. Many art galleries, designers' workshops, boutiques and cafés are found in the neighbourhood, which have played a large role in Mile End being included on numerous lists outlining the world's most cool and unique neighbourhoods.

The comic book company Drawn & Quarterly was founded in Mile End in 1989, and in 2007 opened up a flagship store on Bernard that is now regarded as the literary hub of the neighbourhood. In 1993 a former Anglican church (south of St. Viateur on Park Ave.) was transformed into Mile End Library, renamed Mordecai Richler Library in 2015. This opened the door for a community artistic movement that first hosted exhibitions from Images de Femmes in 1994, and later a variety of other exhibits. In 1998 Mile End art gallery and co-op Ame Art were formed with the assistance of the Park YMCA. The computer graphics software house Discreet Logic made a mark on the area by renovating part of an old clothing factory in 1993. In 1997, this space became the new Montreal studios of computer game developer Ubisoft, which has since expanded to take over the remainder of the building.

Mile End became noticeably gentrified during the 1980s and 90s, and rents continue to increase while shops become more upscale – notably the Laurier West strip. Many small businesses have been closing because of the rent spikes, notably on Bernard Street, and Saint Viateur avenue. Citizens have been protesting against these rent spikes, such as in an event in March 2021 when hundreds of people showed up at an old bookstore, S.W. Welch, on Saint Viateur Avenue with their favorite books to support this cornerstone of the community, which was in danger of closing. S.W. Welch closed its doors in July 2023. These factors have subsequently moved much of the artist community and poorer residents of Mile End further away from Downtown Montreal to Park Extension and other adjacent neighbourhoods.

The writer Mordecai Richler grew up on Saint Urbain Street in the 1930s and 40s, and wrote about the neighbourhood in several of his novels. Wilensky's Light Lunch, which is still open on Fairmount at Clark, features memorably in The Apprenticeship of Duddy Kravitz and the film based on it.

The independent comics publisher Drawn & Quarterly maintains its head office and flagship store in Mile End. Imago Theatre, a feminist theatre company and one of the oldest Anglophone theatres in Montreal, is located in the neighbourhood. William Shatner grew up in Mile End until he moved to Notre-Dame-de-Grâce during his high school years.

In 2005, Mile End was described in several music magazines, notably Spin and Pitchfork Media, as the heart of the city's independent music scene. The neighbourhood continues to be a thriving centre for many artists & musicians. Several venues on Saint Laurent Boulevard and Park Avenue have contributed to the development of the local scene, including popular medium-sized venues Casa del Popolo, La Sala Rossa, and Mile End Cabaret (now Théâtre Fairmount); jazz club Résonance Café (closed due to pandemic-related financial strain), El Salon (now closed), and The Green Room (Le Salon Vert, closed after a fire in 2010). In the 1980s there were Checkers and Club Soda on Park Avenue. Many indie labels such as Arbutus Records, Dare to Care Records / Grosse Boîte, Bonsound, Indica Records, Mindique, Constellation Records, The Treatment Room Studios, and the famous hotel2tango recording studio are also located in Mile End, as is the headquarters for Pop Montreal. Independent record label Mile End Records is also named after the neighbourhood as one of the founders once lived there. The area is home to the city's two most famous bagel bakeries, Fairmount Bagel and St. Viateur Bagel. A branch of the popular vegetarian restaurant Lola Rosa is located in the area, as is the first branch of the Montreal supermarket chain PA Supermarché.

Various local entrepreneurs immortalized the area with their products. Well-known examples are the famous brewpub Dieu du Ciel! offering an English-style mild ale called "Mild End" and a Belgian-style saison called "Saison St-Louis", named after the former village of Saint Louis du Mile End, and brewpub HELM that named all of its beers after the neighbourhood and its streets.

The district has become so popular as a stand-in for New York City on such American productions as Quantico and Brooklyn that in November 2016, the borough announced restrictions on new film and TV shoots, in an area described as "heart" of Mile End, between Parc Avenue, Bernard Street, Saint-Urbain Street and Fairmount Street.

== Geography ==
The boundaries of Mile End are unofficially Mount Royal Avenue to the south, Van Horne Avenue to the north, Hutchison Street to the west, and Saint Denis Street to the east. The municipal electoral district of Mile End is one of the three in the borough of Plateau Mont Royal, along with Jeanne Mance and De Lorimier, and returns one city councillor and one borough councillor.

The main streets running through Mile End from north to south are Saint-Laurent Boulevard, Clark Street, Saint Urbain Street, Waverly Street, Esplanade Street, Jeanne-Mance Street, and Park Avenue. Running east to west are Mount Royal Avenue, Villeneuve Street, St Joseph, Laurier, Fairmount, Saint Viateur, Bernard and Van Horne.

== History ==
=== Origins ===
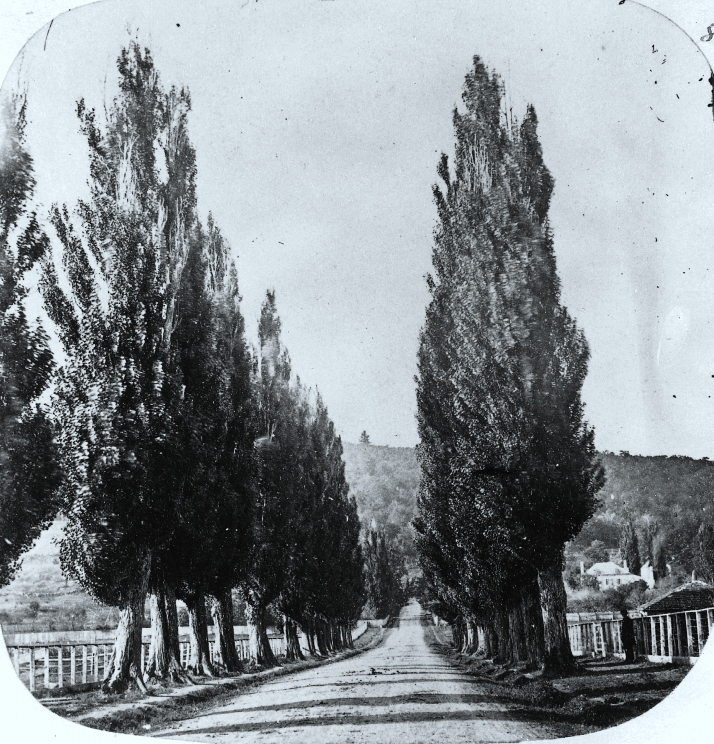
Mile End Road, 1859

Nineteenth-century maps and other documents show the name Mile End as the crossroads at Saint-Laurent Road (now Boulevard) and what is now Mont-Royal Avenue. Originally, this road was Côte Sainte-Catherine Road (heading west) and Tanneries Road (heading east). It is probable that the name Mile End was inspired by the East London suburb of the same name. Contrary to popular belief, the place is not precisely a mile away from any official marker. It is, however, a mile north along Saint-Laurent from Sherbrooke Street, which in the early 19th century marked the boundary between the urban area and open countryside. (Several decades later, the Mile End train station near Bernard Street was situated coincidentally one more mile north along Saint-Laurent from the original crossroads.)

Mile End was also the first important crossroads north of the tollgate set up in 1841 at the city limits of 1792. From the crossroads to the city limits the distance was 0.4 miles (0.64 km). The city limits were located 100 chains (1.25 miles or about 2 km) north of the fortification wall, and intersected Saint-Laurent just south of the current Duluth Avenue. As early as 1810, there was a Mile End Hotel and tavern, operated by Stanley Bagg, an American-born entrepreneur and father of the wealthy landowner Stanley Clark Bagg. The earliest known published references to Mile End are advertisements placed by Stanley Bagg, in both English and French, in The Gazette during the summer of 1815. He announced in July: "Farm for sale at St. Catherine [i.e., Outremont], near Mile End Tavern, about two miles from town...". On 7 August, he inserted the following:

STRAYED or STOLEN from the Pasture of Stanley Bagg, Mile End Tavern, on or about the end of June last, a Bay HORSE about ten years old, white face, and some white about the feet. Any person who will give information where the Thief or Horse may be found shall receive a reward of TEN DOLLARS and all reasonable charges paid. STANLEY BAGG. Montreal, Mile End, August 4, 1815.

A photograph of 1859 shows members of the Montreal Hunt Club at the Mile End tavern.

The road variously known as Chemin des Tanneries (Tannery Road), Chemin des Carrières (Quarry Road), or Chemin de la Côte-Saint-Louis led to a tannery and to limestone quarries used for the construction of much of Montreal's architecture. The village of Côte Saint-Louis (incorporated 1846) sprung up near the quarries, its houses clustered east of the Mile End district around the present-day intersection of Berri Street and Laurier Avenue. It was to serve this village that a chapel of the Infant Jesus was established in 1848 near Saint Lawrence Road, on land donated by Pierre Beaubien. In 1857-8, the chapel was replaced by the church of Saint Enfant Jésus du Mile End. The church, made even more impressive by a new façade in 1901-3, was the first important building in what would become Mile End.

=== The coming of the railway ===
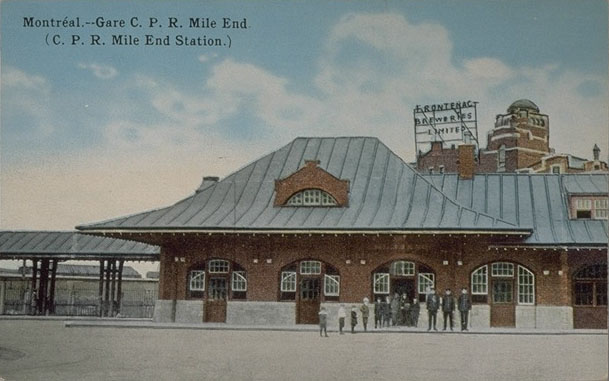
Mile End Station

The transcontinental railway gave Mile End its first growth spurt and separate identity. In 1876, the Quebec, Montreal, Ottawa and Occidental Railway – a project vigorously promoted by Antoine Labelle and Louis Beaubien – came slicing through the area on its way from east-end Montreal to Sainte-Thérèse, Lachute, and Ottawa. This railway was bought in 1882 by the Canadian Pacific, and it was by this route that the first trains departed for the Prairies in 1885 and for Port Moody, British Columbia in June 1886 (extending to Vancouver in 1887). The first Mile End station building was erected in 1877 on the east side of Saint-Laurent Road, near what is now the intersection of Bernard Street. (A much larger station was built in 1911; it closed in 1931, when service was moved to the new Park Avenue Station (Jean-Talon), and was demolished in 1970 to make way for the Rosemont–Van Horne viaduct.) A portion of the Mile End station's metal structure remains today as a performance venue called Entrepôt 77.

In 1878, the village of Saint-Louis-du-Mile-End was incorporated, population 1319. Its territory consisted of the western third of Côte Saint-Louis: bounded on the west by the limit of Outremont (generally along Hutchison Street), on the south by what is now Mont-Royal Avenue, and on the east by a line running mostly just east of the current Henri-Julien Avenue. The northern border was north of present-day De Castelnau Street or just south of Jarry Park.

=== Growth and annexation ===
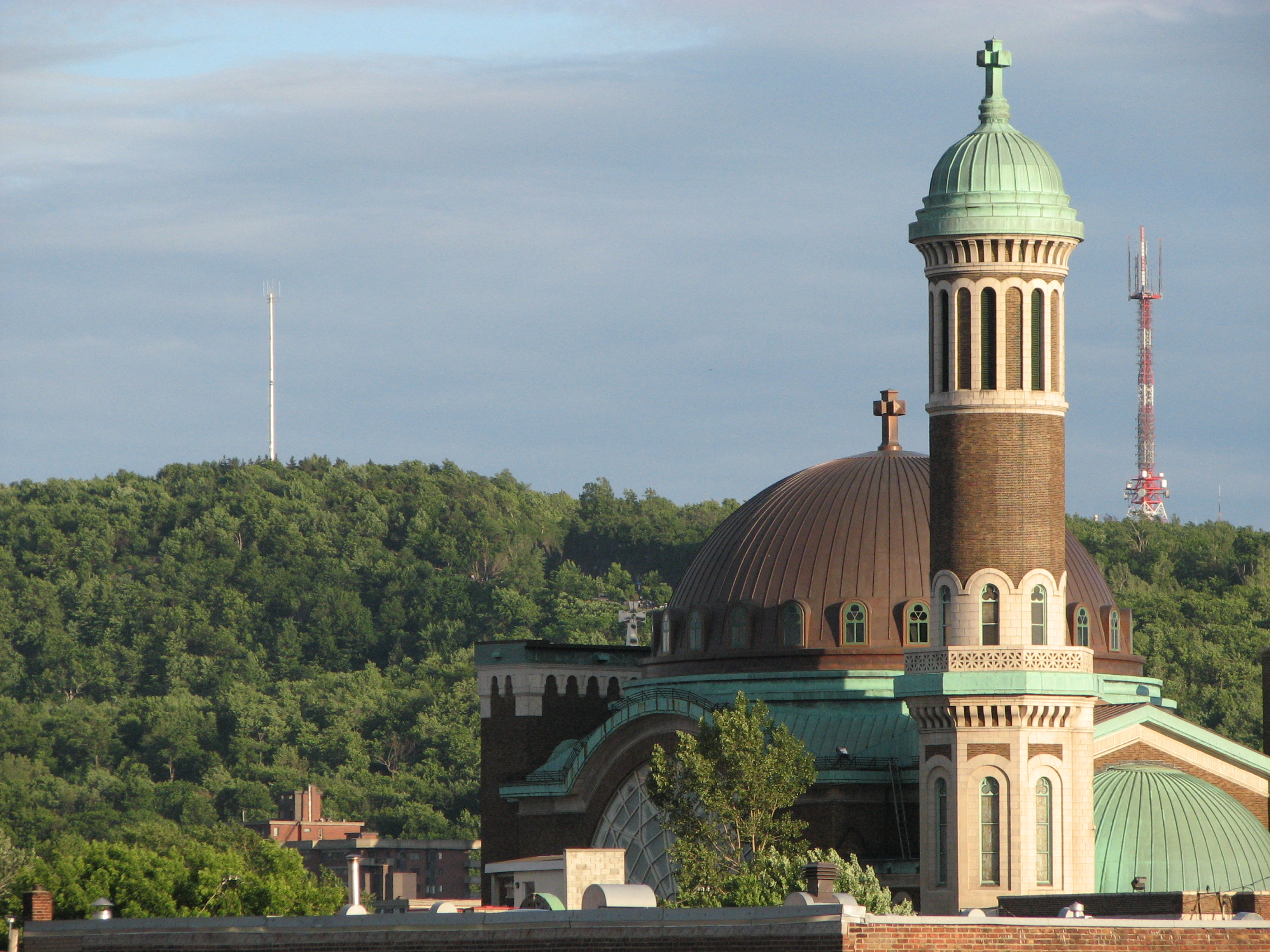
St. Michael's and St. Anthony's Church in Mile End

The second growth spurt of Mile End coincided with the introduction of electric tramway service in 1893; the area can be considered an example of a streetcar suburb. The agricultural and industrial exhibition grounds at the southwest of the village, near Mount Royal, were subdivided in 1899 for housing. The village became a town in 1895 and changed its name to simply Saint-Louis. Apart from a tiny street located just outside the town's northwestern limit, and (for its remaining years) the railway station, the name Mile End passed out of the official toponymy for close to a century, coming back into use as a municipal electoral district only in 1982.

The town of Saint-Louis built in 1905 a magnificent town hall on the northwest corner of Saint-Laurent and what is now Laurier Avenue; the building still serves as a fire hall and firefighters' museum. The town was annexed by the expanding city of Montreal on 29 May 1909, taking effect as of 1 January 1910, and became Laurier Ward (quartier Laurier). Population growth had been explosive: in 1891, the village had 3537 residents; in 1911, after annexation, the ward's population was about 37,000.

Perhaps the most recognizable architectural symbol of Mile End is the Church of St. Michael the Archangel of 1914-5, on Saint-Viateur Street at the corner of Saint-Urbain. The church, designed by Aristide Beaugrand-Champagne, was built for an Irish Catholic community, as expressed by omnipresent shamrock motifs; yet the overall style of the building is based on Byzantine rather than Western architectural traditions. Even more striking, the church has a slender tower that resembles a minaret. The building has been shared since 1964 with the Polish Catholic mission of St. Anthony of Padua, which officially merged with the parish of St. Michael in 1969 to form the current parish of St. Michael's and St. Anthony's; masses are celebrated in Polish and in English.

=== Twentieth-century evolution ===
The ethnic composition of Mile End changed constantly over the course of the twentieth century as the area became home to successive waves of new immigrants. Marianne Ackerman's series of articles on her 100-year-old house gives a vivid picture of the changing vocation of the neighbourhood.

The southwestern portion of Mile End was first a bourgeois suburb, then Montreal's principal Jewish area until the 1950s (later made famous by Mordecai Richler and others) and later home to Greek and Portuguese communities, among others. The Hassidic community has maintained a visible Jewish presence in the Mile End and in neighbouring Outremont. After gaining a reputation as a neighbourhood of artists and musicians in the 1980s, the area underwent gentrification in the 1990s.

The area north of the railway, rarely referred to as Mile End any more, developed separately since the rail corridor interrupts many north-south streets. Early twentieth century immigrants from Italy settled here creating Montreal's Little Italy. The city's largest remaining public market, Jean Talon Market, opened here in 1933.

Parts of Mile End were heavily industrialized in the first half of the century because of the proximity of transportation by rail. Much of Mile End served as the heart of Montreal's garment district for many decades.

Municipal electoral reform in 1978 replaced the old wards with smaller, more uniformly sized districts and further reform in the 1980s grouped districts into boroughs (arrondissements). Within the borough of Plateau Mont Royal/Centre-Sud, the name Mile End was given in 1982 to a district covering essentially the part of the old Laurier Ward lying south of the railway tracks. This is the area that is now generally associated with the name. The electoral district was expanded eastward to Saint Denis Street in 2001 (the borough having been renamed Le Plateau-Mont-Royal) and as far as Laurier Park in 2005, so that it now includes the historic centre of the village of Côte Saint-Louis. Most of the former northern half of Saint-Louis-du-Mile-End now lies within the Saint-Édouard district of the borough of Rosemont–La Petite-Patrie.

== See also ==
- Places in Montreal
- Rialto Theatre (Montreal)

== Bibliography ==
- Various historical maps of Montreal, available online at Bibliothèque et archives nationales du Québec
- Philip Fine, "Montreal’s Mile End threatened by gentrification", in Forum (Université de Montréal), 11 October 2005 (quotes historian Susan Bronson; journalist credited only in French version)
- Marianne Ackerman, "A Century in This House", originally published in The Gazette, 11 March-8 April 2006
- Michèle Benoit and Roger Gratton, Pignon sur rue: Les quartiers de Montréal. Montreal: Guérin, 1991. ISBN 2-7601-2494-0
- Les rues de Montréal: Répertoire historique. Montréal: Éditions du Méridien, 1995. ISBN 2-89415-139-X
- ATSA, "Frags" (series of posters on the history of Saint-Laurent Boulevard; in French), 2006.
