= Macrina Bakery =

Bakery in the U.S. state of Washington

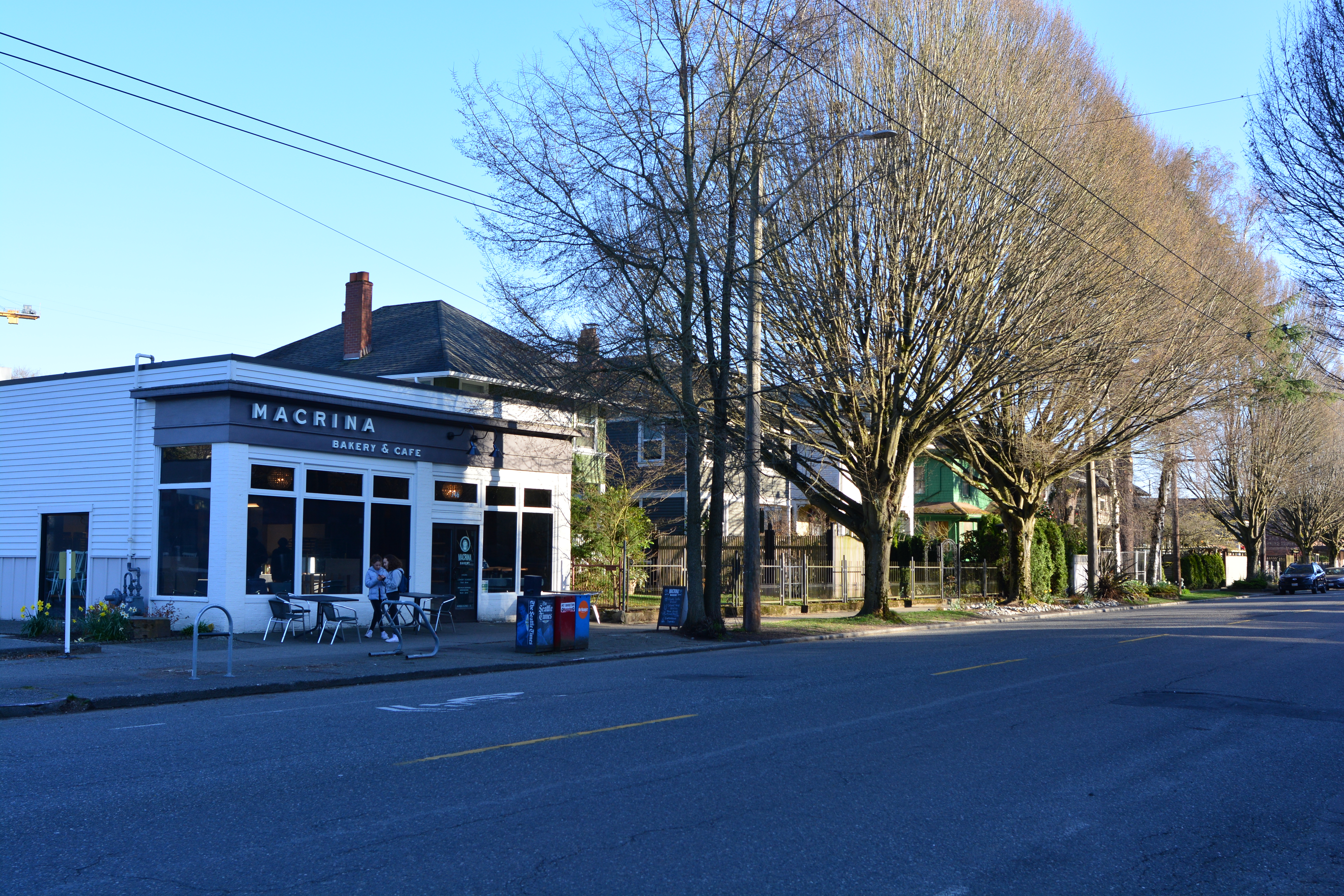
- Exterior of the bakery on 19th Avenue East in Seattle in 2020

Restaurant information
- Established: 1993
- Owner: Leslie Mackie
- Location: Washington, United States
- Website: macrinabakery.com

Macrina Bakery is a small chain of bakeries in the Seattle metropolitan area, in the U.S. state of Washington.

== Description ==
Macrina Bakery is a bakery with multiple locations in the Seattle metropolitan area. Since 2016, the business has been headquartered in Kent, Washington. In Seattle, there are locations in Belltown, Queen Anne, and SoDo.

In addition to breads and pastries (such as almond croissants, dark-chocolate brownies, ginger cookies, and Nutella brioche), the bakery has served cake, pasta, pies, quiches, salads, and sandwiches. Macrina began serving bagels in 2020.

Aimee Rizzo of The Infatuation has described the SoDo location as "a nice space that's perfect for getting some work done".

== History ==
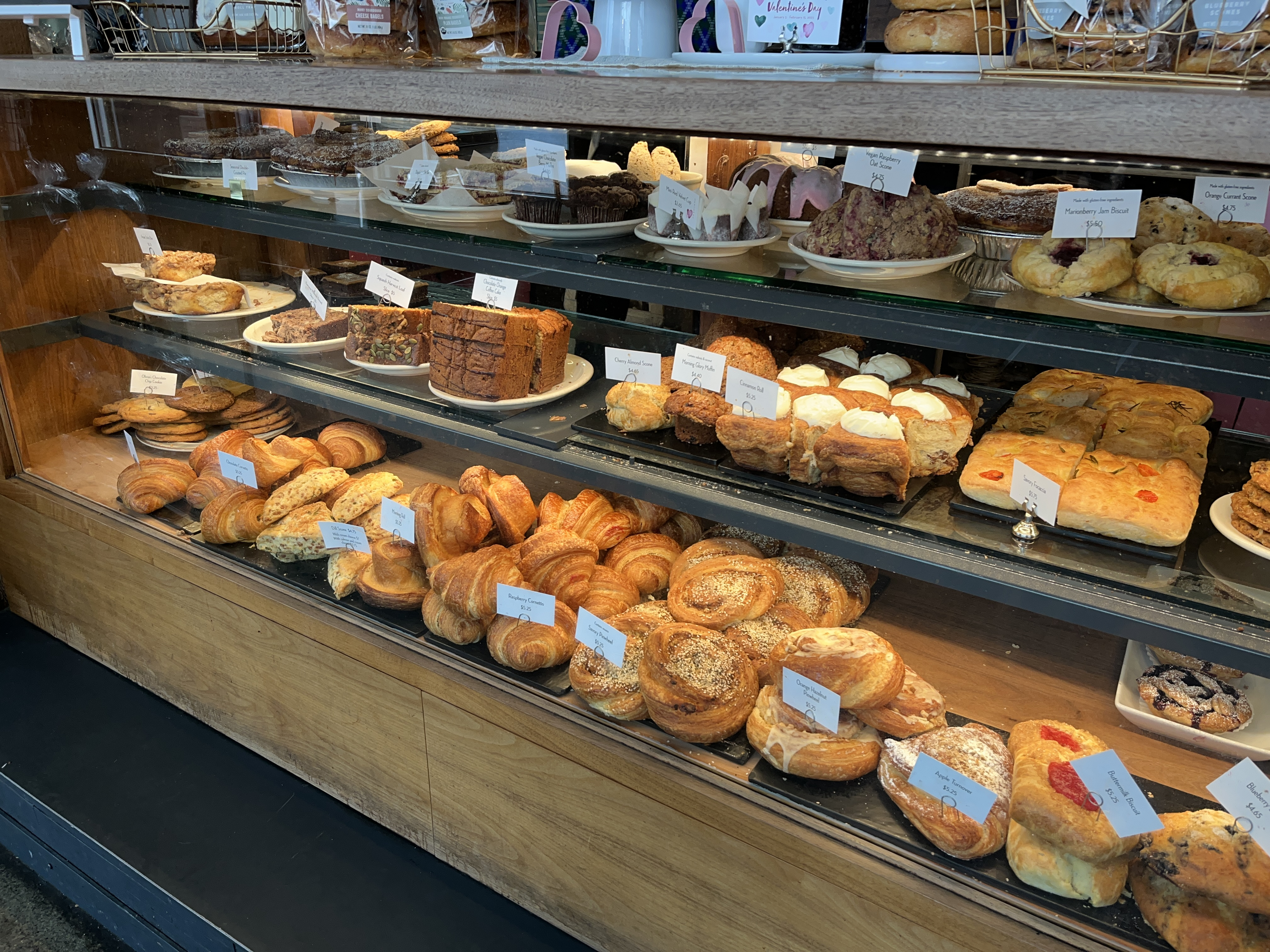
Interior of the bakery in SoDo, Seattle, in 2023

Owner Leslie Mackie founded Macrina Bakery in Belltown in 1993. Scott France is the chief executive officer of Macrina Bakery, as of 2018.

Macrina's third location opened in 2008. In 2016, the company's headquarters were relocated from SoDo to Kent. Macrina employed approximately 175 people at the time. A fifth location opened in 2018. In 2023, the business confirmed plans to open a sixth location in Maple Leaf in June.

The bakery supplied Amazon Go, as of 2018, and Amazon Fresh, as of 2021. In 2020, during the COVID-19 pandemic, Macrina responded to restrictions "by clearing away chairs and transforming into a coffee-to-go business". In 2022, the business sold shortbread cookies decorated with the flag of Ukraine for a limited time.

== Reception ==
Fodor's has said Macrina Bakery has "become a true Belltown institution". In 2014, Caitlin Morton included the business in Condé Nast Traveler's list of 13 "destination" bakeries and recommended the caramel turtle brownies. In 2021, Amanda Ahn of The Daily of the University of Washington wrote, "Among more than 20 pastries, the rocket muffin, lemon lavender coffeecake, citrus oat scone and cinnamon monkey bread are too good for words."

== See also ==
- List of bakeries
- List of restaurant chains in the United States
