= Donald Bell (writer) =

Canadian journalist

- Born: 1937
- Died: 2003 (aged 65–66)
- Occupations: Journalist, humorist
- Writing career
- Notable work: Saturday Night at the Bagel Factory

Donald Bell also known as Don Bell (1937–2003) was a Canadian journalist who won the Stephen Leacock Award in 1973 for his book Saturday Night at the Bagel Factory. The book has also been credited with helping to make the bagel a staple of Montreal's food culture beyond the city's Jewish community alone.

Based in Montreal, Bell was a columnist for Books in Canada and a contributor to various newspapers and magazines. He was an early popularizer of the theory that Thomas Neill Cream, a Canadian medical doctor, was the real Jack the Ripper, through pieces published in both The Criminologist and the Toronto Star.

== Early life ==
Son of a clothing manufacturer, born in New York City on 17 November 1936. During the Depression, his parents moved to Montreal, where he was raised in the Town of Mount Royal and attended Baron Byng High School and McGill University (1957). Upon graduation, he joined the old Montreal Herald as a sports reporter. He then moved to Calgary, where he worked for the Albertan, and later as a freelancer for CBC radio in Montreal. He also wrote radio plays and travelled to Cuba, France, and the British Isles. In London, he spent a year as a reporter for the Daily Sketch and came back to Canada in 1966. In the late Sixties, he had a column at the Montreal Gazette and also wrote for The Montreal Star and Weekend Magazine.

Some of Bell's interviews with prominent writers and academics (Jorge Luis Borges, S. I. Hayakawa, Northrop Frye, and others) were reprinted years after the original in other publications. For example, Jorge Luis Borges interview in 1968 appeared in The National Post on 24 August 1999, the hundredth anniversary of Borges's birth.

== Author ==
In 1972, McClelland and Stewart published "Saturday Night at the Bagel Factory and Other Montreal Stories", an anthology of his short stories depicting many of his multi-ethnic friends. The book became popular in Montreal and won the 1973 Stephen Leacock medal for humour. Bell was a recipient of a National Magazine Award.

Seven years later, he wrote "Pocketman" about a Montreal character (based on London, Ontario's Roy McDonald) with a gift of the gab, and a sunny disposition, narrating personages he met and knew, from beatniks, artists, poets, and philosophers. Later, he spent researching Montreal and New York archives to find out about "The Man Who Killed Houdini". The book was released posthumously in 2004 by Véhicule Press in Montreal.

In the early 2000s, Bell lived in Montreal, Paris, and Sutton, Quebec, where he became an antiquarian book dealer and opened a book store in 2002. Don's column, Founde Bookes, appeared in Books in Canada until he died of emphysima in his daughter's house in Montreal on 8 March 2003.

== Sources ==
- Alan Hustak: Obituaries: "Writer, broadcaster put Montreal bagels on literary map", The Gazette, Saturday, 8 March 2003, page E5
