= New York–style bagel =

First style of bagel introduced into the United States

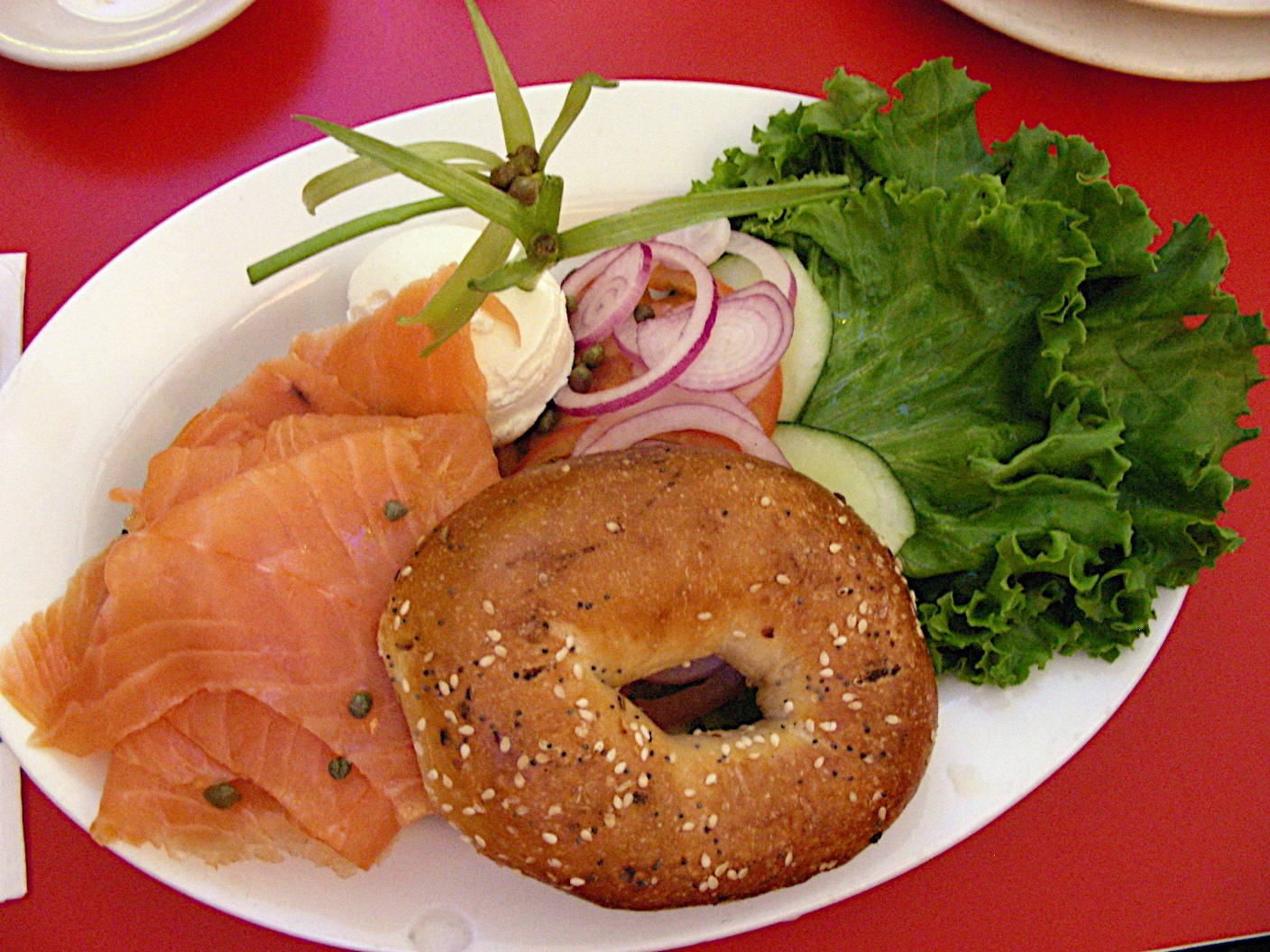
- New York–style bagel with lox
- Type: Bagel
- Place of origin: United States
- Region or state: New York City
- Main ingredients: Barley malt
- Similar dishes: Montreal-style bagel

The New York–style bagel is the original style of bagel available in the United States, originating from the Jewish community of New York City, and can trace its origins to the bagels made by the Ashkenazi Jews of Poland.

A traditional New York–style is typically larger and fatter than a mass-produced bagel, or a wood-fired Montreal-style bagel. They have also grown over time, from about 3 ounces (85 g) in 1915 to 6 ounces (170 g) in 2003.

== History ==
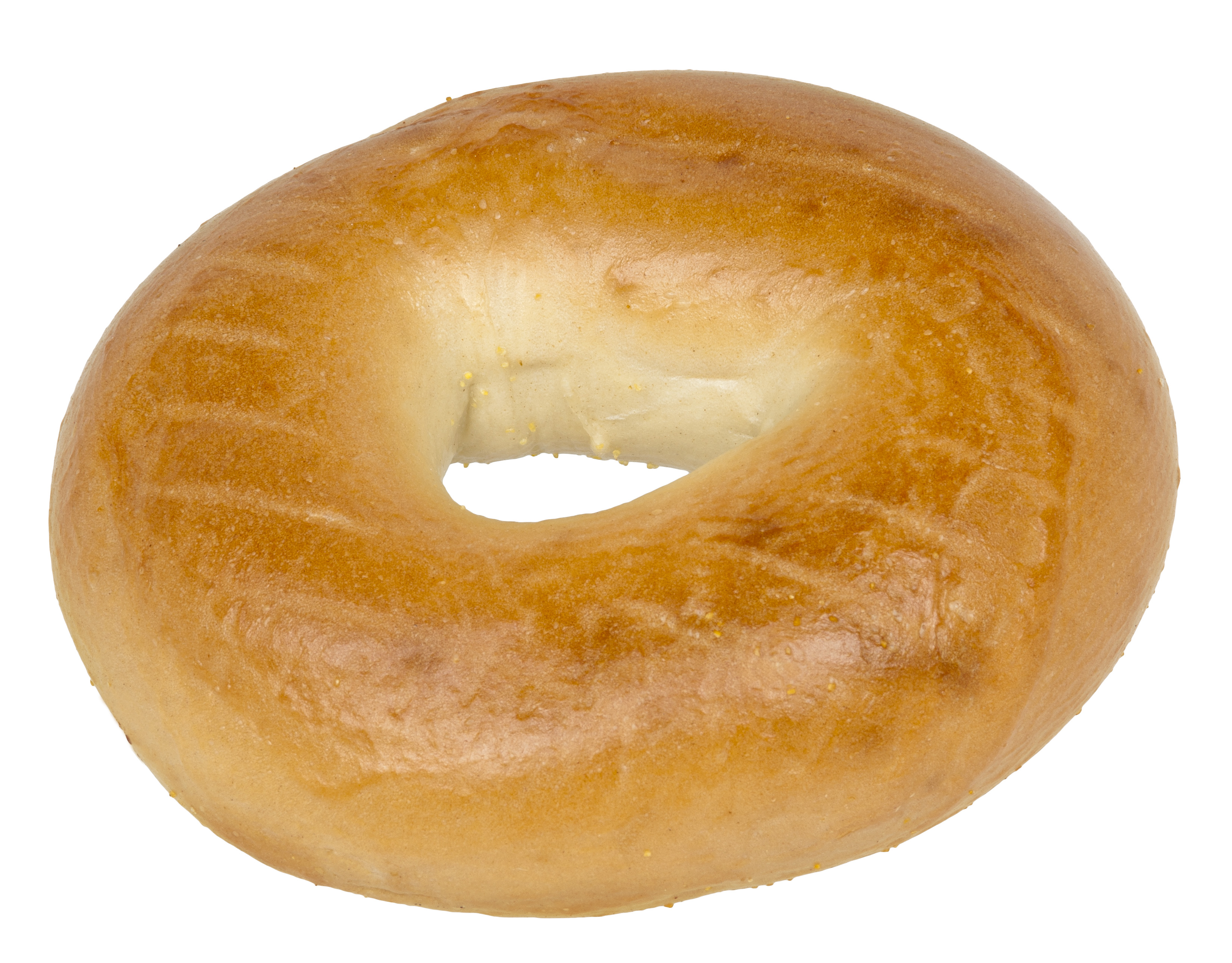
The original plain New York-style bagel

As Jewish refugees from Poland and Eastern Europe began to arrive in New York City en masse in the 1800s, they brought their traditional foods with them. For many decades, bagels were little known outside of the Jewish community, where their popularity was widespread. Bagels became so popular among the Jewish community of New York, that unions were formed to represent bagel bakers in the city, such as Bagel Bakers Local 338, which by the early 1910s represented over 300 bagel craftsman in Manhattan.

New York–style bagels are the original bagel available in the United States, where it was popular as a filling, tasty, inexpensive treat for Jewish immigrants living in Manhattan in the 1800s. Beginning in the 1960s, the popularity of the New York–style bagel began to increase with the non-Jewish population of New York City and beyond. Over the decades the size of the New York–style bagel increased from around 3 ounces to the more commonly found 6 ounces sizes today.

== Texture and flavor ==
Many people claim the main difference in taste and texture of a real New York bagel compared to other styles of bagels is due to the use of New York City tap water, which contains certain minerals which they attribute to creating a better bagel. Specifically attributed are the low concentration of calcium, low concentration of magnesium, and high level of total dissolved solids found in New York City municipal water, each helping to make the water softer. Soft water has been claimed to strengthen the gluten in the bagel dough, helping to create the chewy inside and crispy outside characteristic of a New York–style bagel.

Christopher Pugliese, owner of a popular bagel shop in the East Village attributes the New York–style bagel's signature taste to "100% the water". The use of New York City water in a bagel has been compared to the terroir of grape varietals used to make champagne.

Conversely, Peter Shelsky, co-owner of Shelsky's Brooklyn Bagels firmly believes that it is not the water. According to Mr. Shelsky, "New Jersey and Long Island, both are dotted with fantastic NY style bagels. Both New Jersey and Long Island have different water supplies, and that water has vastly different composition to that of New York City proper. A great bagel with the right texture can be made anywhere. It's not the water. It's the know-how." The use of New York tap water in the bagel-making process may not be the only reason for the difference in texture and flavor in a NY bagel compared to other styles of bagel, according to Josh Polack, owner of a bagel shop in Denver, Colorado which tries to mimic the water used in New York–style bagels:

It’s not just the water that makes a good bagel, but it’s a number of things that have been done the same way for almost 200 years. You can take one of the processes out; you can take the water out, and keep everything else true to the tradition and still have a really awesome bagel. But if you take out the water, and the oven that they traditionally use, you’re not going to get the same bagel.

== Preparation ==
A New York–style bagel is always boiled in water that has had barley malt added, which gives a bagel its signature taste, texture, and leathery skin. The bagels are then traditionally topped with sesame seeds, poppy seeds, dried onion or garlic, or everything bagel seasoning, or are left plain or brushed with an egg wash. While these are the traditional flavors of NY style bagels, newer sweet flavors such as cinnamon-raisin are also available, having originated in the 1950s and 1960s. These sweeter flavors have been criticized by some New Yorkers and members of the Jewish community, some of whom call the sweeter flavors a shonda.

The bagels are then loaded onto burlap-covered cedar or pine boards which have been wetted down with water, or sometimes coated with cornmeal or semolina, and are then baked in the oven. Halfway through the cooking process, the baker takes the boards and flips the bagels over and removes the boards from the oven. The bagels are then removed and allowed to cool.

== Serving ==
A fresh New York–style bagel is traditionally never toasted. Some New York City bagel shops, like Murray's in Chelsea and Ess-a-Bagel at 21st and Third Avenue, have had no-toasting policies. Toasting of bagels in New York City is considered a bastardization and sacrilege. Former New York Times food critic Mimi Sheraton called the practice of eating toasted bagels obscene.

=== Bagel with lox and schmear ===
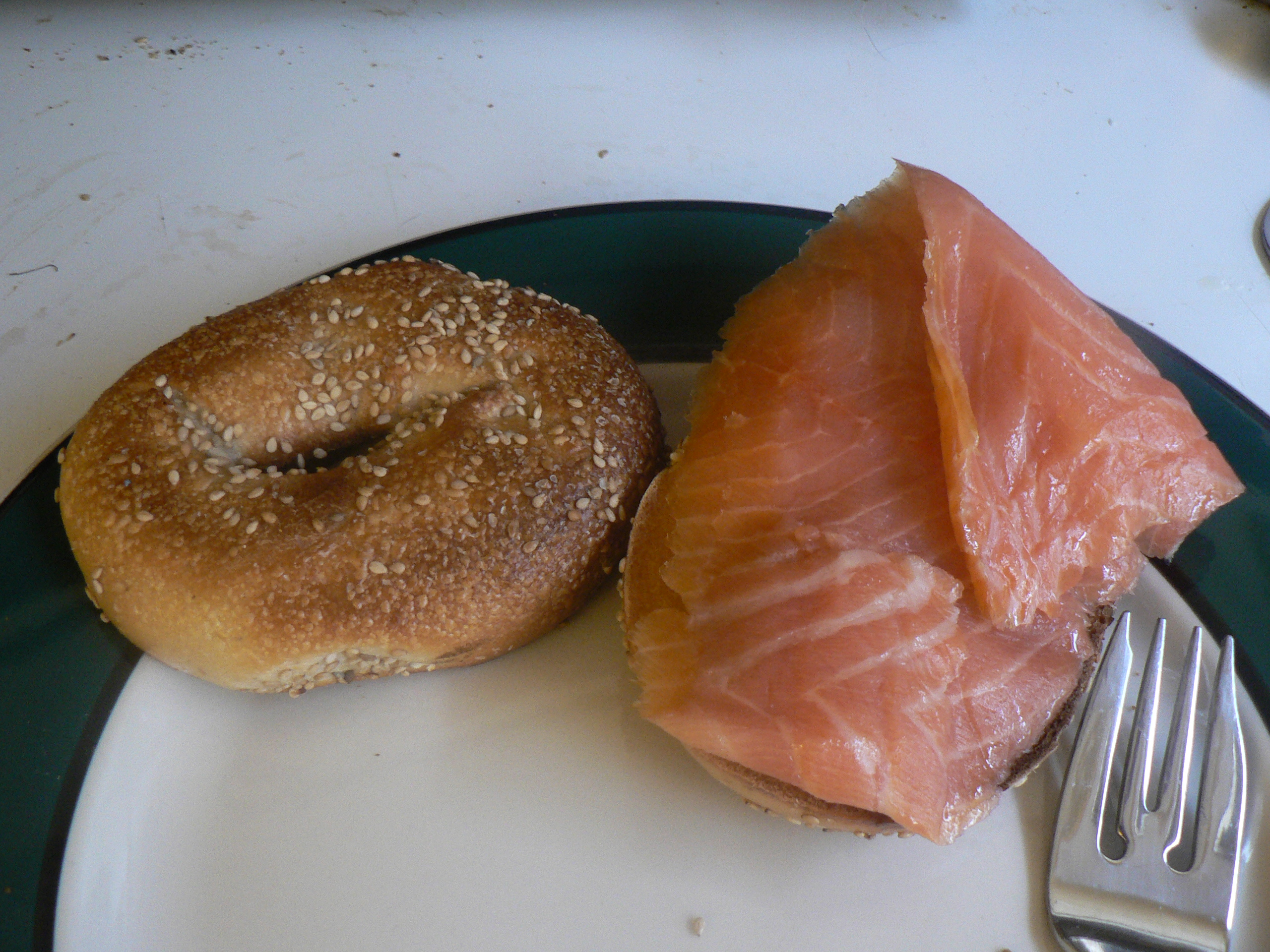
A New York bagel with lox

According to Jewish culinary historian Gil Marks, the Jewish community in New York City developed the bagel with lox and schmear in the 1930s as a kosher adaption of eggs benedict, which Jewish people are unable to eat due to eggs Benedict both containing pork and mixing dairy and meat (both of which are violations of kashrut, Jewish dietary law). This was unique to the Jews of New York City, as Jewish communities in Poland had traditionally spread schmaltz on their bagels, or had eaten them with cholent, or other various soups and as a dinner roll.

== See also ==
- Cuisine of New York City
