= Landmarks of Montreal =

== Churches and other religious buildings ==
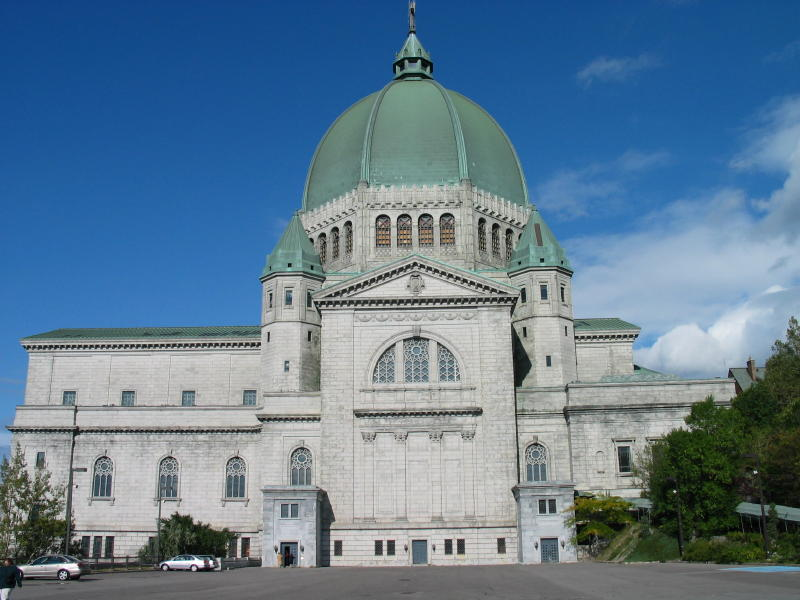
Saint Joseph's Oratory is the largest church in Canada.

Nicknamed "la ville aux cent clochers" (the city of a hundred belltowers), Montreal is renowned for its churches. As described by Mark Twain, "This is the first time I was ever in a city where you couldn't throw a brick without breaking a church window." The city has four Roman Catholic basilicas: Mary, Queen of the World Cathedral, the aforementioned Notre-Dame Basilica, St. Patrick's Basilica, and Saint Joseph's Oratory. The Oratory is the largest church in Canada, with the largest dome of its kind in the world after that of Saint Peter's Basilica in Rome.

Other well-known churches include the pilgrimage church of Notre-Dame-du-Bon-Secours, which is sometimes called the Sailors' Church, the Church of St. Michael and St. Anthony, known for its Byzantine architecture, and the Anglican Christ Church Cathedral, which was completely excavated and suspended in mid-air during the construction of part of the Underground City.

An impressive number of other churches, synagogues and mosques can be found, and church steeples are a familiar view all over the city and island.

== Green Spaces in Montreal ==
The city’s public green spaces are categorized as major urban parks, neighborhood parks, city squares, and nature parks. The parks provide facilities for recreation, education, historical-cultural programming, and organized fitness activities. Park activities vary seasonally, and each park features its own unique programming. The city’s large parks account for approximately 2,000 hectares of the island’s land. The Ville de Montreal also considers cemeteries, certain golf courses, and green alleys as green spaces. Green spaces improve air quality, reduce the effect of urban heat islands, contribute to residents’ quality of life, preserve biodiversity, and improve the city’s aesthetic. The city is also home to small scale neighborhood green spaces, such as green alleys and community gardens.

Below is a list of Montreal’s public green spaces:

=== Major urban parks ===
==== Mount Royal ====
Mount Royal was designed in 1876 by Frederick Law Olmsted, best known as the designer of New York's Central Park. Mount Royal's features include the Chalet and the Kondiaronk Belvedere overlooking downtown Montreal, and man-made Beaver Lake (Lac aux Castors) with its recently renovated pavilion. Mount Royal is topped by an illuminated cross that has become a Montreal landmark.

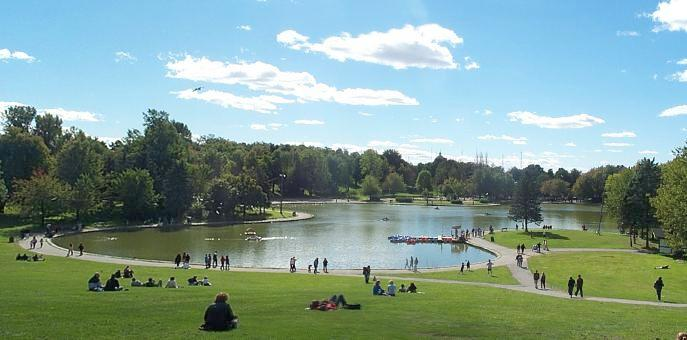
Beaver Lake (Lac aux castors), Mount Royal.

Observant hikers on the park's many trails will find an abundance of small wildlife. In the winter, the park is the site of numerous cross-country ski trails and a new, refrigerated skating rink near Beaver Lake.

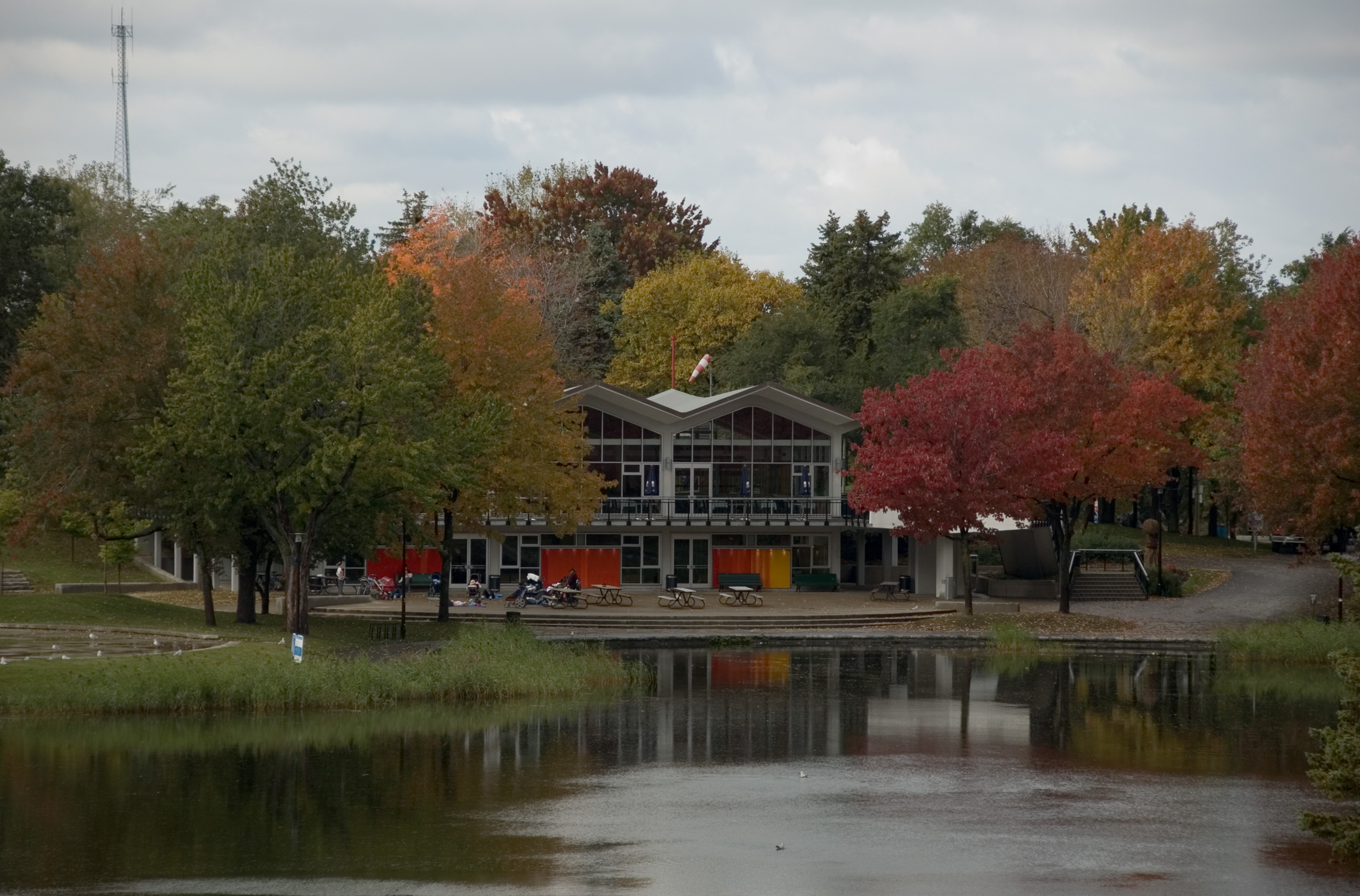
Beaver Lake (Lac aux castors), Mount Royal.

Once, a funicular railroad brought sightseers to its peak, but it has long since disappeared. A tramway also went up the mountain on the north side, replaced in the late 1950s by the Camillien Houde Parkway, which now bisects the mountain. The "11-Montagne" bus line now replaces the tram. Every Sunday in the summer, hundreds of people gather at the George-Étienne Cartier Monument, at the foot of Mount Royal, for drumming, dancing, and juggling (among many other activities) in an event known as the Tam-Tams. It is unclear how this event started; but, as it has no formal organization and has carried on both in a lively and peaceful way since at least the late 1980s. The intersection of Avenue du Parc and Avenue des Pins, just to the south, formerly a winding urban interchange (inspired by the New York parkways of Robert Moses), underwent a major transformation to become more pedestrian-friendly.

Parc Jean-Drapeau

Located in the middle of the St. Lawrence River, Parc Jean-Drapeau consists of the islands of Sainte-Hélène and Notre-Dame, which hosted Expo 67. Parc Jean-Drapeau is accessible by métro, car, bicycle or boat. The islands are a popular destination for Montrealers due to their green spaces and sports and cultural activities.

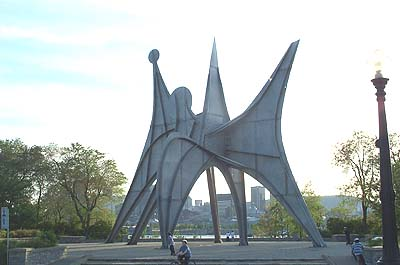
Man by Alexander Calder at Île Sainte-Hélène

==== Île Notre-Dame ====
The Floralies gardens are located at the centre of the island. Île Notre-Dame also has a network of canals, and, further west at the lake, offers a beach and other water sports. The Casino de Montréal and a youth hostel are also located here. The Montreal Grand Prix takes place on the island at the Circuit Gilles Villeneuve, which in winter is used as a skating rink.

==== Île Sainte-Hélène ====
Built in 1814, the Fort on Saint Helen's Island houses the Stewart Museum, dedicated to the history of New France. The island also contains several large public works of art, such as the imposing "Man", sculpted in steel by artist Alexander Calder. It is home to the Biosphère, Jean-Doré beach and Six Flags La Ronde. Buses run every 15 minutes from the Jean-Drapeau metro station to La Ronde.

=== History ===
Montreal’s driving force behind the creation of green spaces was inspired by the “City Beautiful” movement of the nineteenth century. This led for many parks to be underway for development, producing green spaces that held a mix of picturesque, English-style gardens and the North American “City Beautiful” movement trend. By the second half of the nineteenth century, Montreal completed building Parc La Fontaine, Parc Jean Drapeau and Parc du Mont-Royal which filled the city spaces, overall attracting more tourists to the area. As many parks and green spaces were constructed in Montreal, it became evident that the Western parts of the island had more parks in comparison to the Eastern areas, which suffer lower socioeconomic status. For example, Westmount is a wealthy anglophone neighbourhood with 12 parks and 22 green spaces. In comparison, areas such as LaSalle and East of Montreal were identified as having less green spaces and higher vulnerabilities. Beautifying Montreal through the construction of green spaces was seen as a symbol of economic progress and financial health. Those who built the parks believed that the improvement in the appearance of the city would create social order along with the moral betterment of urban dwellers. However, as the city grew in both size and in population, Montrealers began to lose interest in protecting their parks until 1970, when the Montreal Urban Community (MUC) was formed and park conservation options were considered. This led to the MUC to invest over $100 million on creating additional green spaces, which resulted in more than 600 hectares of new parks. Today, the city is known for spending the most on construction and design of green spaces in comparison to all other Canadian cities.

=== Issues and controversies ===
Green spaces in Montreal have also been a place of conflict. In a series of policy decisions called the “Morality Cuts”, which targeted the LGBTQ2S+ community in the 1950s, Montreal mayor Jean Drapeau famously ordered for hundreds of trees in Mont Royal park to be cut down to deter gay cruising activity. The clear cutting not only changed the look of the landscape but also introduced invasive species to the area, which continue to disturb the ecology of Mont Royal park today. However, issues surrounding green space in Montreal do not only exist in the past, and controversy continues to this day. Urbanization on the island of Montreal has been detrimental to the protection and upkeep of green space. The expansion of road networks throughout the early 2000s, specifically Autoroute 440, affected at least five separate green parks in the Île Bizard region.

Green spaces that exist today are also not evenly distributed across the Montreal landscape. There is a concentration of green spaces in the middle of the island –near the downtown core and surrounding neighbourhoods– but there exists a clear lack of parks available to the residents of the Eastern region of Montreal. There have also been past issues with securing municipal and provincial funding to buy and protect green spaces on the island of Montreal. In the 2002 budget year, the government set aside only $1.5 million dollars over three years for acquiring new green spaces and protecting existing parks in the city. While there have been more recent investments in green spaces and talks of buying land on the West Island to make a large park, some of the area is privately owned and cannot be fully protected.

=== Future developments ===
The future of green spaces in Montreal appears to be promising, but there are issues that showcase conflicts in the city’s future initiatives. The creation of a 3,000-hectare park in the northwest corner of Montreal, le Grand Parc de l’Ouest, is the city’s largest green space development, and will incorporate five nature reserves that will be connected through forests, wetlands, and trails. Despite the praise it has received from environmentalists, it has also been criticized for its location in the higher-income west side, where parks are easily accessible to its residents. The city has adopted the Protection and Enhancement of Natural Space, an ongoing policy since 2004, that will address the disparity in green space availability between east and west by focusing on parks such as the Saint Jacques Escarpment and the East Island Greenbelt. Plans for the future of the Saint Jacques Escarpment belong to the larger Turcot Yards project. In shifting the highway north, the city freed up space for a 2 km long park with a bicycle path, as well as green walkways to connect Notre Dame de Grace with other neighbourhoods that were inaccessible before. Again, to promote accessibility, Montreal’s Mayor announced a budget of $18 million for shoreline redevelopment for 11 boroughs on both east and west ends. This new project seeks to increase neighbourhood access to waterfront public spaces, by constructing new piers, expanding shorelines, and using these new areas to create green spaces. The Mayor also announced the revitalization of the east-end’s Parc La Fontaine, by transforming the current road that divides the park into a pedestrian walkway, renovating the park’s theatre, and cleaning up its pond. Although Montreal suffers from an east-west disparity in green spaces, it is demonstrating its commitment in diminishing this gap through the initiatives it has planned for the new decade.

== Museums and cultural centres ==
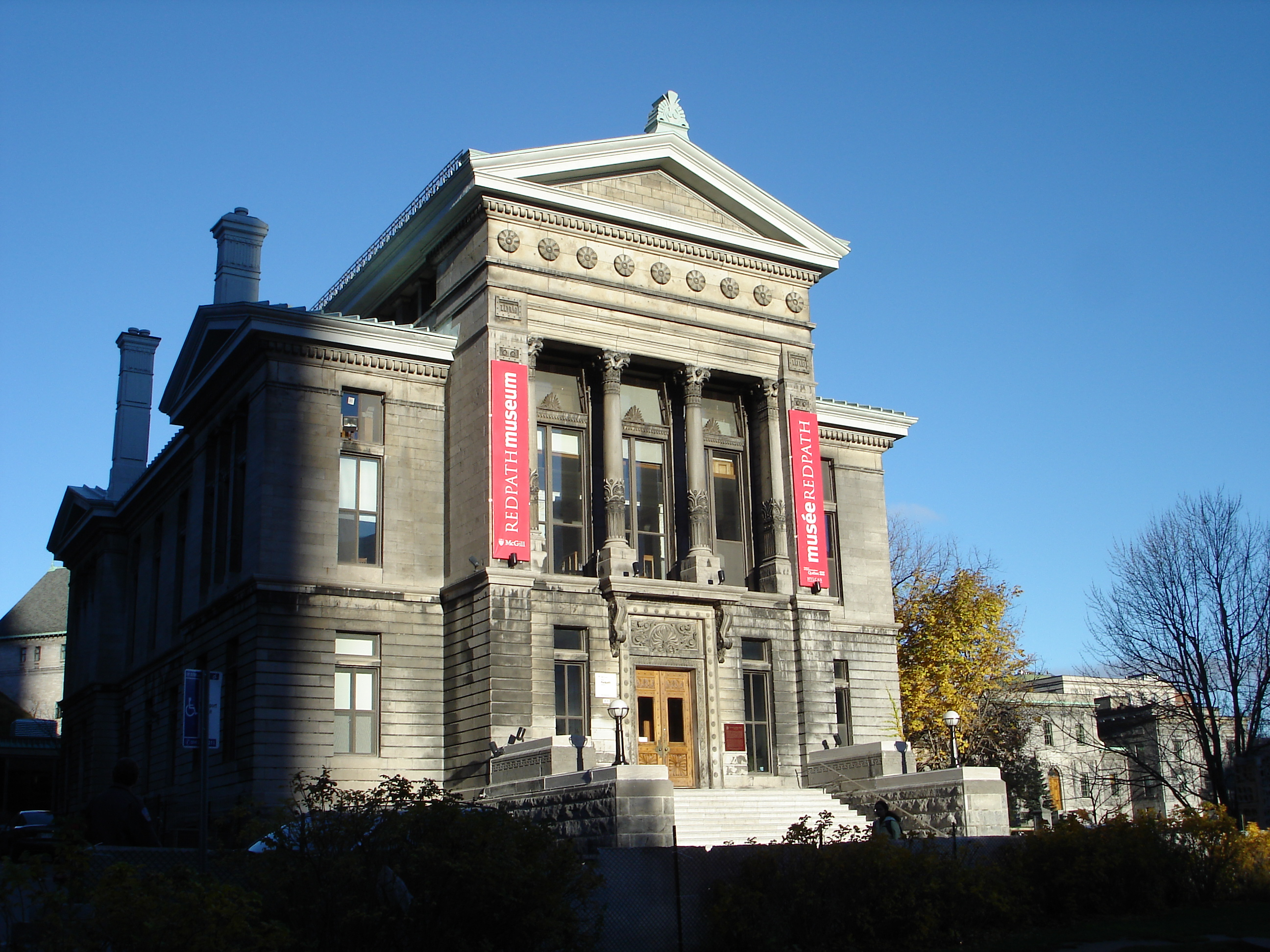
Redpath Museum

Montreal is the centre of Quebec culture and a major centre of Canadian culture in general. It has many specialized museums such as the Montreal Museum of Fine Arts (MMFA), the Musée d'art contemporain (MAC), the Redpath Museum, the Stewart Museum, the McCord Museum of Canadian History, and the Canadian Centre for Architecture. The Place des Arts cultural complex houses the MAC and several theatres, and is the seat of the Montreal Opera and the Montreal Symphony Orchestra, although the latter is slated to receive a new concert hall adjacent to Place des Arts.

== Olympic Park ==
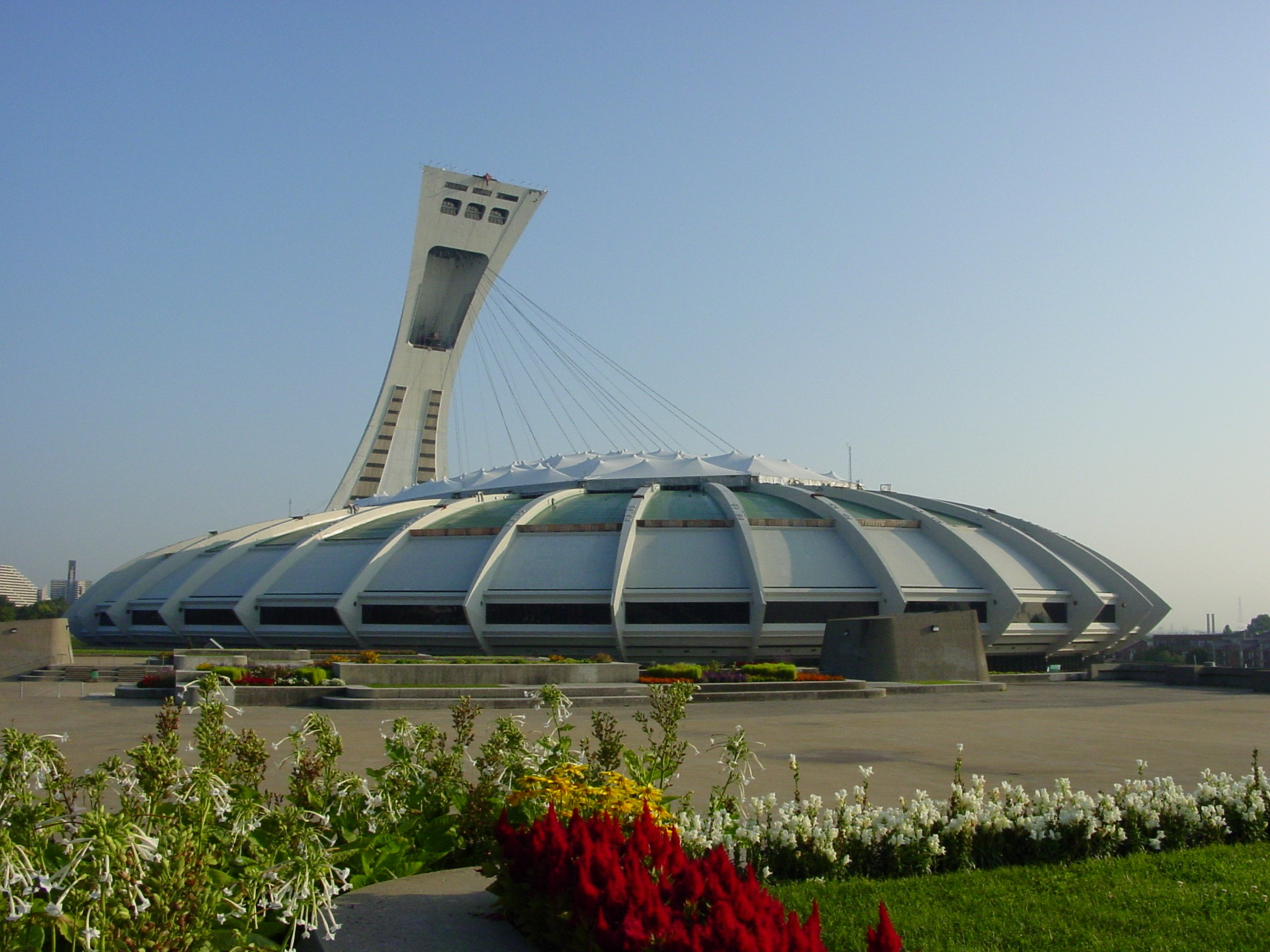
The Olympic Stadium, in the city's eastern section

The Olympic installations site is next to Metro Pie-IX and Metro Viau, 6 km (3.7 mi) from downtown in the Hochelaga-Maisonneuve district, and consists of several buildings designed by French architect Roger Taillibert. The Olympic Stadium is ovoid shaped with a distinctive 'ribbed' look, and has the world's tallest inclined tower at 175 m (574 ft) high; it leans at 45 degrees. The complex includes the Montreal Biodome, originally a fully functional velodrome. Two pyramidal towers, known as the Olympic Village, were built to house athletes but now serve as both apartments and offices.

The Montreal 1976 Summer Olympics were successful, but construction problems and corruption created a massive financial burden for citizens. At the opening, the tower and the retractable roof were incomplete. The tower was completed years later but the retractable roof was never completed as originally planned by Taillibert. Anglo locals refer to the stadium as the "Big O" due to its shape, but also as the "Big Owe" — a reference to the Olympic Park's exorbitant total cost, which was only paid off thirty years later with the help of a special tobacco tax.

The stadium was also home to the Expos from 1977 until the team moved to Washington, D.C. after the 2004 season, and has sometimes been home for the Montreal Alouettes. Today, Montreal's Olympic Park hosts limited professional sports events and is mainly a tourist and cultural attraction.

Montreal hosted the 2006 1st World Outgames holding the opening/closing ceremonies and many of the events at the Olympic Stadium. The event drew over 10,000 participants. Most were Gay athletes, but many participated in other cultural events such as ballroom dancing. Opening ceremonies brought international athletes, local politicians, and entertainers.

== Space for Life ==
Space for Life (French: Espace pour la vie) is a museum district. It consists of five natural museums: the Biosphere, the Biodome, the Rio Tinto Alcan Planetarium, the Botanical Garden and the Insectarium.

The Biosphere is a museum dedicated to the environment, housed in the former United States pavilion constructed for Expo 67. It is located in Parc Jean-Drapeau, on Saint Helen's Island. The Biodome, a former velodrome, is a facility located in the Olympic Park which allows visitors to walk through replicas of various ecosystems. The Montreal Botanical Garden, located in the borough of Rosemont–La Petite-Patrie, comprises 75 hectares (190 acres) of thematic gardens and greenhouses. It is one of the biggest botanical Gardens in the world, second only to Royal Botanic Gardens, Kew in England. The Montreal Insectarium is located within the Botanical Garden and features many insects of various species, both live and dead.

== Underground City ==
Montreal's Underground City (French: La ville souterraine) is the set of underground city complexes in and around downtown. It is also known as the indoor city (ville intérieure), as not all of it is underground. With over 32 km (20 mi) of tunnels spread over an area of 12 km^{2} (4.6 sq mi), the 60 residential and commercial complexes comprise 3.6 km^{2} (1.39 sq mi) of floor space, including 80% of all office space and 35% of all commercial space in downtown Montreal. Services include shopping malls, hotels, banks, offices, museums, universities, seven metro stations, two commuter train stations, a bus terminal and the Bell Centre hockey arena. There are more than 120 exterior access points to the underground city. Some 500,000 people use the underground city every day, especially to escape the traffic and/or Montreal's harsh winter.

== See also ==
- List of neighbourhoods in Montreal
- List of National Historic Sites of Canada in Montreal
