= Holy Mountain =

Holy Mountain may refer to:

- the mytheme or archetype of the world mountain
- mountains considered sacred mountains
- in Abrahamic tradition
  - Mount Sinai, by the Bedouin, a mountain in the Sinai Peninsula of Egypt
  - Mount Tabor, Lower Galilee, Israel
  - Temple Mount, Jerusalem
  - Mount Gerizim, West Bank, Palestine

== Toponymy ==
- Mount Athos, called the Holy Mountain or Hagion Oros (Ἅγιον Ὄρος)
- The Holy Mountain, a translation of Jebel Barkal, a mountain in Nubia
- Holy Mountains National Nature Park in Ukraine
- Sacri Monti of Piedmont and Lombardy (Italy), World Heritage Site

== Popular culture ==
- The Holy Mountain (1926 film), a German silent film
- The Holy Mountain (1973 film), a 1973 film directed by Alejandro Jodorowsky
- Holy Mountain (website), a National Film Board of Canada interactive documentary
- Holy Mountain (band), a Scottish psychedelic rock band
- Sleep's Holy Mountain, a 1993 album by the band Sleep
- "Holy Mountains", a song by the band System of a Down on the album Hypnotize
- Holy Mountain Records, a record label, distributing artists such as the band Om
- "Holy Mountain" (song), a song by Noel Gallagher's High Flying Birds from the album Who Built the Moon?
- "The Holy Mountain", a song by Poppy from the 2019 EP Choke
