= Mount Royal Funicular Railway =

Funicular in Montreal, Canada (1884–1918)

Coordinates: 45.50884°N 73.58781°W

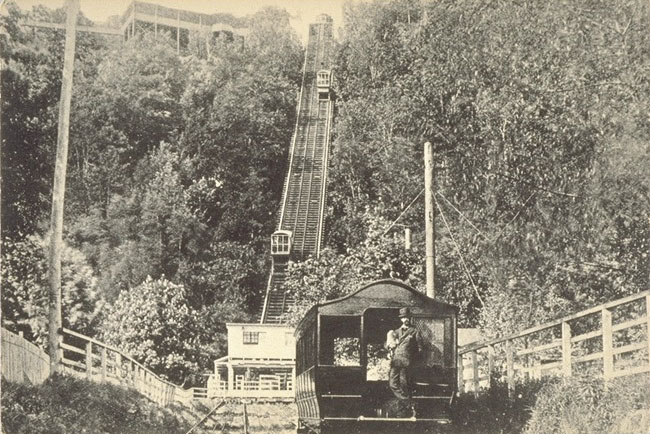
Postcard view, contrasting horizontal car in foreground with cars on inclined section, at rear.

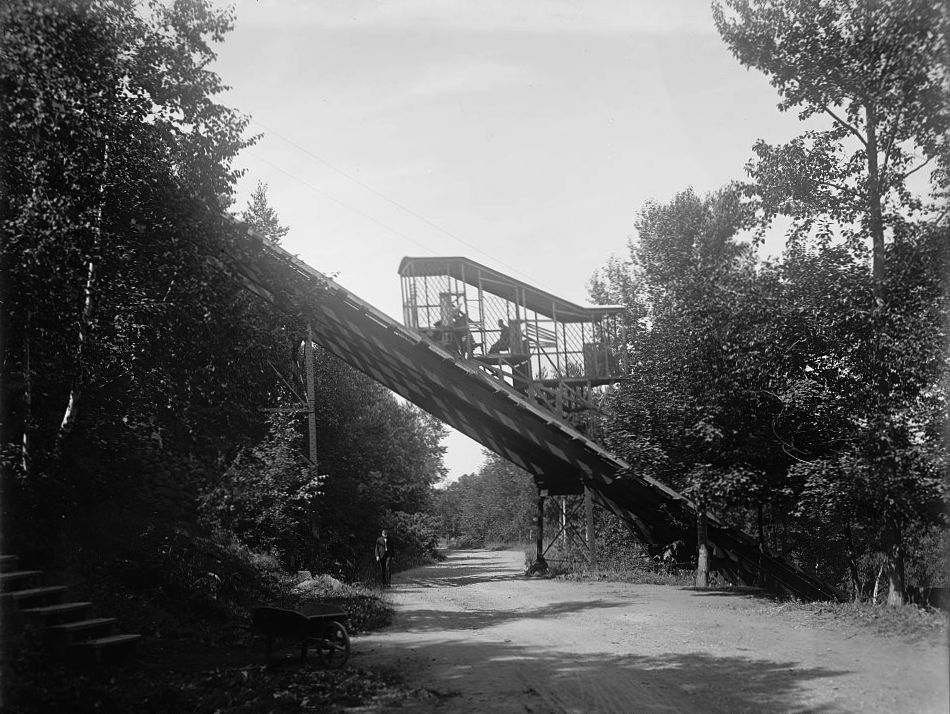
The funicular crossing the Mount Royal park trail.

The Mount Royal Funicular Railway, also known as the Mountain Park Funicular Railway and the Mount Royal Elevator, was a funicular railway serving Mount Royal Park in Montreal, Quebec, Canada, from 1884 to 1918.

The railway consisted of a horizontal section that brought travellers from the ticket house, located near what is now the George-Étienne Cartier Monument, to a transfer station at the base of the mountain, where riders boarded the funicular cars. Both sections were steam-driven, with cars pulled by cables.

The funicular was inaugurated in 1884, a year before its official opening. Rides initially cost 5 cents for adults and 3 cents for children. It transported visitors to the summit of Mount Royal, facing east. Frederick Law Olmsted, the designer of Mount Royal Park, was opposed to the funicular. His plan was for people to take a leisurely stroll up the mountain and to enjoy the views along the way instead of being whisked straight to the top by a machine. It was declared structurally unsafe and closed in 1918, and dismantled in 1920.

== See also ==
- List of funicular railways
