= Aristide Beaugrand-Champagne =

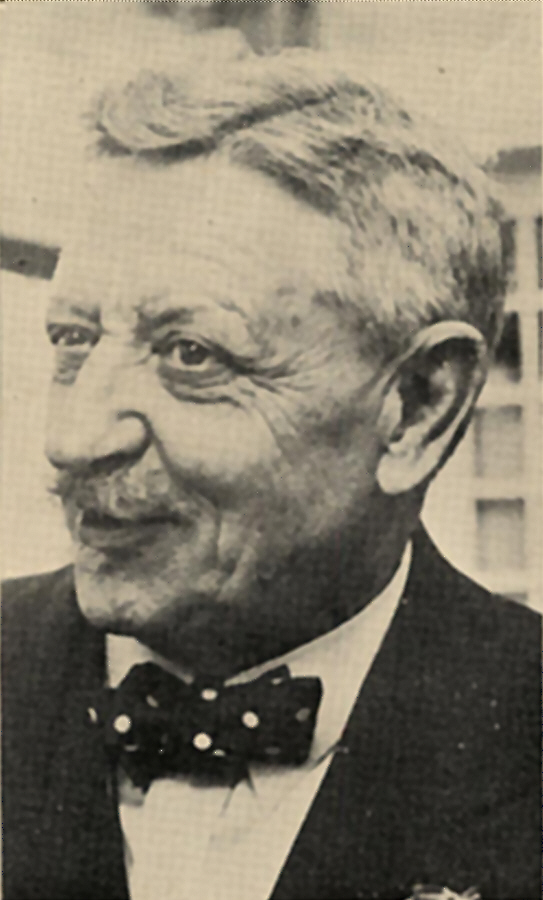
- Beaugrand-Champagne in 1937
- Born: November 27, 1876; Saint-Anicet, QC, Canada
- Died: December 16, 1950 (aged 74); Outremont, QC, Canada
- Education: École polytechnique de Montréal
- Occupation: Architect
- Buildings: St. Teresa of Avila Cathedral, Amos; Church of St. Michael and St. Anthony; Mont Royal Chalet

Aristide Beaugrand-Champagne (November 27, 1876 – December 16, 1950) was a Canadian landscape architect and architect based in Montreal, Quebec.

Born in Saint-Anicet, Quebec, he attended Collège Sainte-Marie de Montréal to study landscape architecture, and began his career in Montreal as a designer of gardens, cemeteries, and public thoroughfares. His interest turned to building architecture, and he enrolled at the École polytechnique de Montréal in 1908, studying under Max Doumic, graduating in 1911. He was simultaneously a lecturer there on building construction, until the closure of the architecture program in 1922.

He is noted in particular for several churches in the Byzantine Revival style, which was uncommon at the time in North America. The Church of Saint Michael the Archangel in the Mile End district, completed 1915, was a radical departure from almost every other church in the province. He continued to experiment with the form and materials over the next decade, culminating in the Cathedral of St. Teresa of Avila in Amos, completed in 1924. The cathedral was the first Catholic church in Quebec built entirely of reinforced concrete, and features a dome spanning nearly one hundred feet.

He designed the Mount Royal Chalet in Montreal's Mount Royal Park. This building, located near the summit, was designed in the French Beaux-Arts style and completed in 1932. Other works include a number of residences in Outremont (1912–1950), the gymnasium at the Académie Querbes (1925), and the Church of the Nativity in Swanton, Vermont (1925).

In 1924, he helped formed the École des beaux-arts de Montréal, teacher there and later serving as its dean of faculty. He died in Outremont in 1950, where he was serving as chair of the Board of Assessors.

After his death in 1950, he was entombed at the Notre Dame des Neiges Cemetery in Montreal.
