= St. Teresa of Avila Cathedral (Amos) =

Coordinates: 48.5731°N 78.1175°W

- Cathédrale Sainte-Thérèse-d'Avila
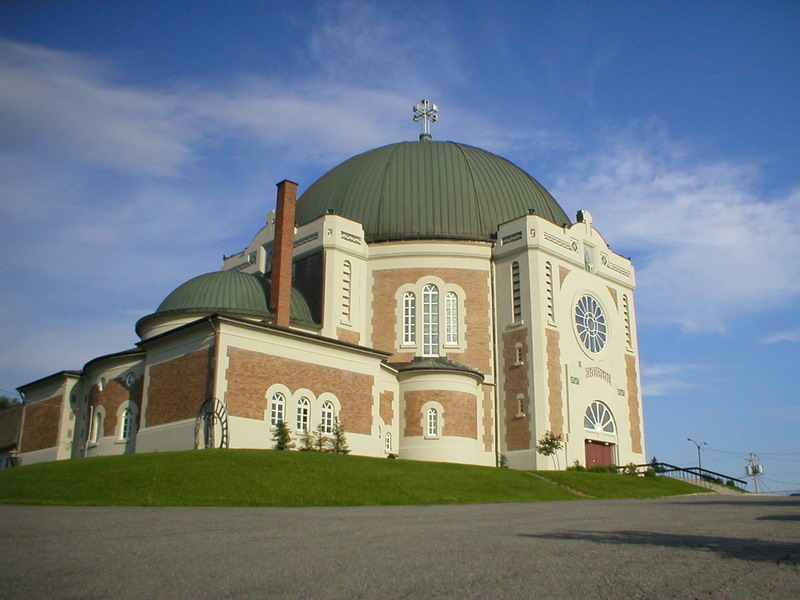
- St. Teresa of Avila Cathedral
- Location: Amos; Quebec
- Country: Canada
- Denomination: Roman Catholic Church

Patrimoine culturel du Québec
- Official name: Cathédrale d'Amos
- Type: Classified heritage immovable
- Designated: December 12, 2003

The Cathedral of St. Teresa of Avila (French: Cathédrale Sainte-Thérèse-d'Avila) is the cathedral of the Roman Catholic Diocese of Amos, which encompasses western and northern Quebec, Canada. It is located in the center of Amos, on the east bank of the Harricana River on the highest hill of the town, and visible for a great distance. It is the only Catholic cathedral in the Abitibi-Témiscamingue region.

The cathedral was built in a "Roman-Byzantine" style, with a circular Byzantine floor plan as opposed to the more common cruciform Romanesque plan, in 1922–23. It is made of steel and reinforced concrete, unusual materials in the construction of places of worship at the time.

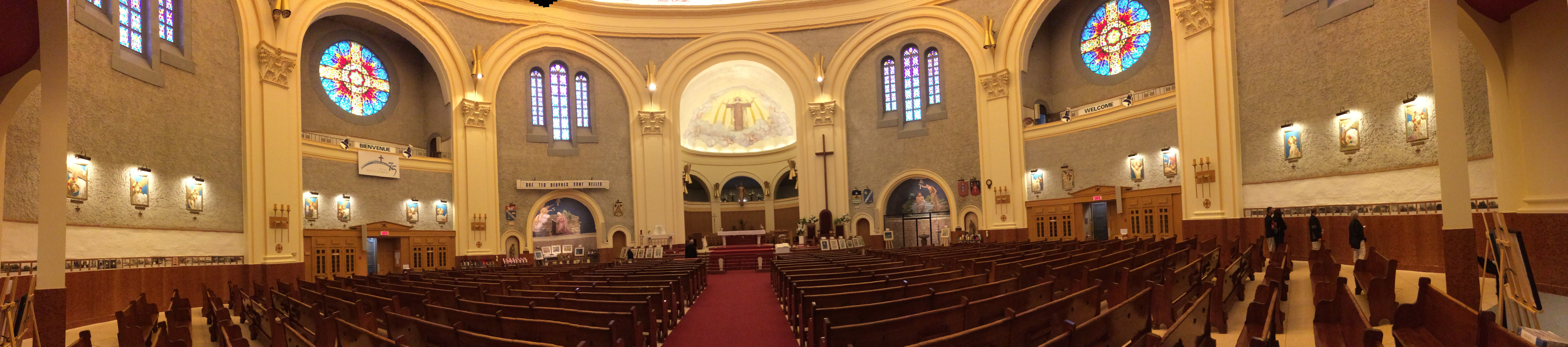
Internal view

== History ==
Fr. Joseph Dudemaine celebrated the first Mass in what is now Amos on 15 October 1911, the feast of Saint Teresa of Ávila, in the home of a parishioner. After the town was formed in 1914, the effort to build a parish church began. Construction commenced in 1922 on plans by Aristide Beaugrand-Champagne of Montreal, who had also designed the neo-Byzantine Church of St. Michael (1915), and was completed the following year.

The Diocese of Amos was erected in 1939, and the church was named its seat at that time. It was designated a provincial heritage site in 2003.

== Architecture ==
St. Teresa's is a unique example of Byzantine Revival architecture, which itself was uncommon in North America at the time of construction, with Romanesque elements. It has a circular design with a large dome of reinforced concrete, rising 10 storeys high. The use of concrete was novel, but deemed prudent given the area's frequent forest fires.

The interior decor has been enriched in phases by the parishioners, including stained glass windows from France on three sides, and a large mosaic of St. Teresa of Italian ceramic tiles with gold powder behind the main altar. Additional mosaics on side walls depict the baptism of Jesus and the Annunciation, as well as the Stations of the Cross. A Casavant organ was installed in 1953.

Buried in the crypt are Joseph Louis Aldée Desmarais, first bishop of Amos, and M. Hector Authier, a former mayor.

== See also ==
- Catholic Church in Canada
