= Holy Mountain (website) =

- Website type: Web documentary
- Available in: English/French
- Owner: National Film Board of Canada
- Creators: Hélène de Billy; Gilbert Duclos
- Website: http://holymountain.nfb.ca/
- Commercial: no
- Registration: no
- Launched: 2010

Holy Mountain (French:Sacrée Montagne) is a 2010 National Film Board of Canada web documentary about Mount Royal in Montreal, Quebec, Canada. Holy Mountain was created by writer and journalist Hélène de Billy, photographer and filmmaker Gilbert Duclos, along with Montreal-based web design firm Departement.

This multimedia site features videos by professional filmmakers and artists along with user-generated content such as photos, voice messages, social network links and comments.

The site's navigation is based on areas on the mountain, with users able to choose their own path. There are 7 main sections on the site, the first one representing the mountain as a whole, in 360-degrees, the others representing different sites: the George-Étienne Cartier Monument, the paths and woods, the mountain's cemeteries, the Saint Joseph's Oratory, Beaver Lake and the Mount Royal Cross.

Holy Mountain took sixteen people three months to develop. At launch the site had 11 videos, with more added later for a total of 25. These additions included videos by choreographer Marie Chouinard and filmmaker Xavier Dolan. The soundtracks for each section change according to the time and weather on the mountain.

As of May 2011, photos and videos from the site are being displayed on a giant screen in an arrival hall at Montréal-Pierre Elliott Trudeau International Airport, as part of an exhibition of NFB works at the airport.

== Awards ==
The site received a Favourite Website Award as well as the Grand Prix Grafika, awarded for best in Quebec graphic design. In May 2011, it also received the 2011 Prix du Mont-Royal, awarded by the City of Montreal and Les amis de la montagne, a charitable organization which works to protect and enhance Mount Royal.
