= Jeanne-Mance Park =

Urban park in Montreal, Canada

- Parc Jeanne-Mance
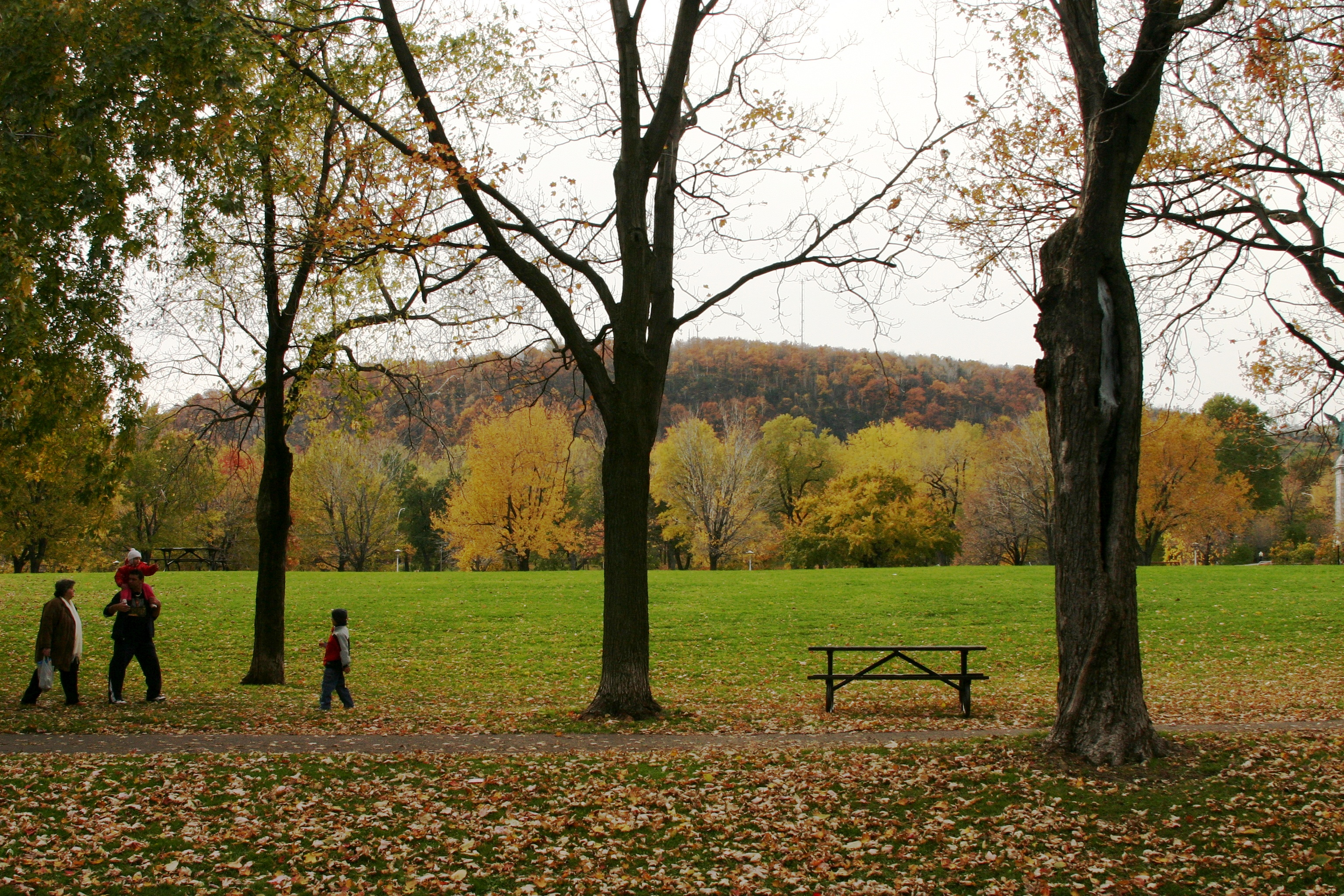
- Jeanne Mance Park, with Mount Royal in the background
- Interactive map of Jeanne-Mance Park
- Type: Urban park
- Location: Le Plateau-Mont-Royal, Montreal, Quebec, Canada
- Coordinates: 45°30′57″N 73°35′03″W
- Area: 14 hectares (35 acres)
- Operator: City of Montreal
- Open: 6:00 a.m. to 12:00 a.m.
- Status: Open all year
- Public transit: STM Bus: 11, 80, 97, 125, 144, 480
- Website: Parc Jeanne-Mance

Jeanne Mance Park, formerly known as Fletcher's Field, is an urban park in the Plateau Mont-Royal borough of Montreal, Quebec, Canada. Named after the co-founder of Montreal, Jeanne Mance, the park is located along Park Avenue, opposite Mount Royal, and just south of Mount Royal Avenue. It has an area of 14 hectares. It is considered to be one of Montreal's large parks.

== History ==
The park was previously known as Fletcher's Field. According to local tradition, the park was named after one Fletcher, who lived on the outskirts of the grounds and pastured his cows there.

The history of the park began at the end of the 19th century with the planning of Mount Royal Park and the city's acquisition of land on Mount Royal, which ran from the summit of the mountain to Esplanade Avenue, between Pine Avenue and Mount Royal Avenue. In 1878, Montreal's Crystal Palace was relocated to Fletcher's Field. The structure was destroyed by fire in July 1896. In 1879, Fletcher's Field was identified by the Pharmaceutical Society of Great Britain as a notable source of Hyoscyamus niger, a psychoactive plant.

The park used as a military parade ground, as was Logan's Farm (now part of La Fontaine Park). During the Great War, troops were trained on Fletcher's Field. The Montreal Lacrosse Club and Royal Montreal Golf Club (as well as youth lacrosse and football clubs) also used Fletcher's Field.

In September 1910, during the Montreal Eucharistic Congress, there was a campaign to rename the park in recognition of the founder of the Hôtel-Dieu de Montréal. The city of Montreal officially changed the name of the park to Jeanne Mance Park in 1990. The plaza entrance of Jeanne Mance Park opposite the Sir George-Étienne Cartier Monument is affectionately known as Place Fletcher's Field, serving as a reminder of the park's former name.

== Features ==
- The park features playgrounds, one softball field, tennis courts with night lights, a dog park, a soccer/football field with artificial turf, a children's swimming pool (in the summer) and an outdoor skating rink (in the winter).
- An Art Deco drinking fountain with an inscription in honour of Louis Rubenstein is located at the corner of Mount Royal Avenue and Park Avenue.
- Public washrooms beneath Place Fletcher's Field, the plaza opposite the Sir George-Étienne Cartier Monument on Park Avenue.
