= Mount Royal Chalet =

Building on Mount Royal in Quebec, Canada

Mont Royal Chalet
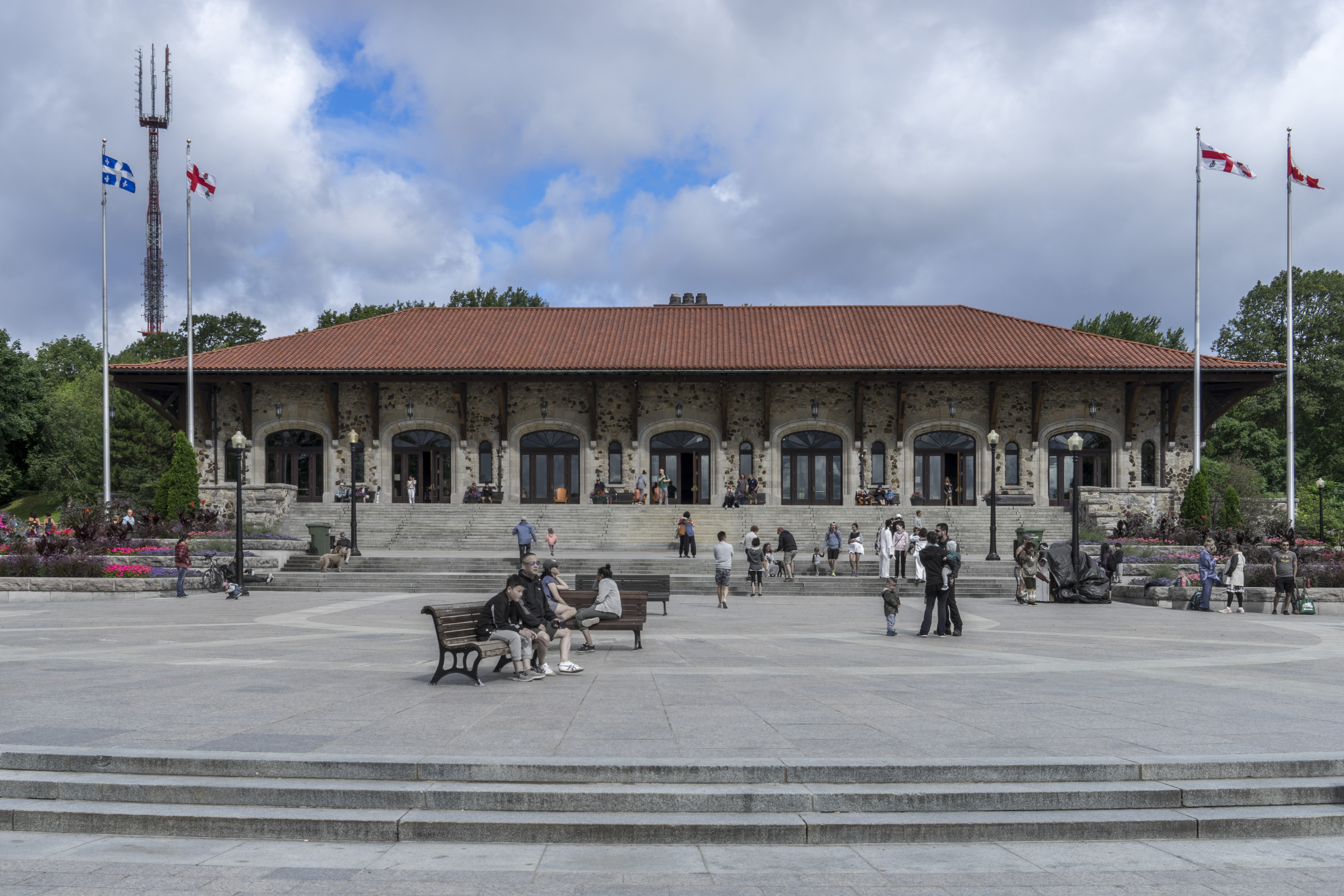
- Mont-Royal Chalet in 2017

- Location within Quebec

General information
- Architectural style: Beaux-Arts
- Location: Mont-Royal, 1196 Camillien-Houde Road, Montreal, Quebec, Canada
- Coordinates: 45.5039°N 73.5876°W
- Completed: 1932
- Client: Ville de Montreal
- Owner: Ville de Montreal

Design and construction
- Architect: Aristide Beaugrand-Champagne

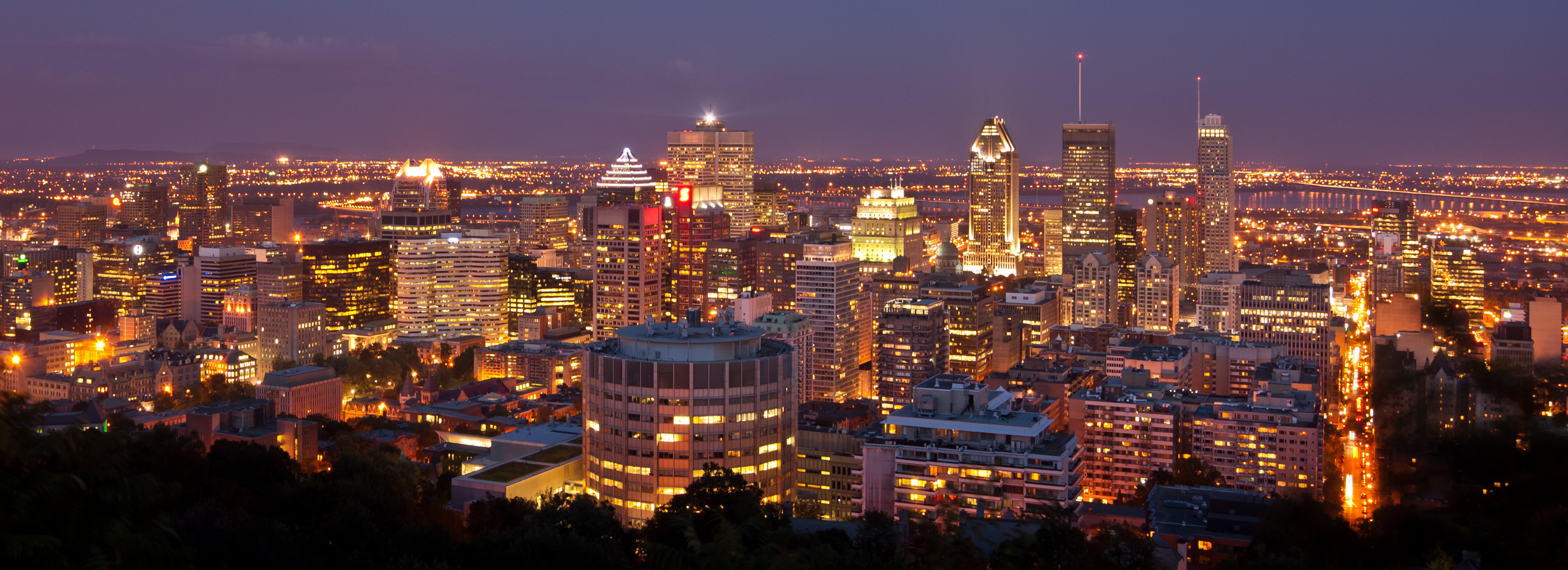
View from the Kondiaronk lookout; located in front of the Mount Royal Chalet

Mount Royal Chalet is a building located near the summit of Mount Royal in Montreal, Quebec, Canada. The chalet was constructed in 1932 under the mayoralty of Camillien Houde as a make-work project during the Great Depression. The French Beaux Arts structure was designed by Montreal architect Aristide Beaugrand-Champagne (1876-1950).

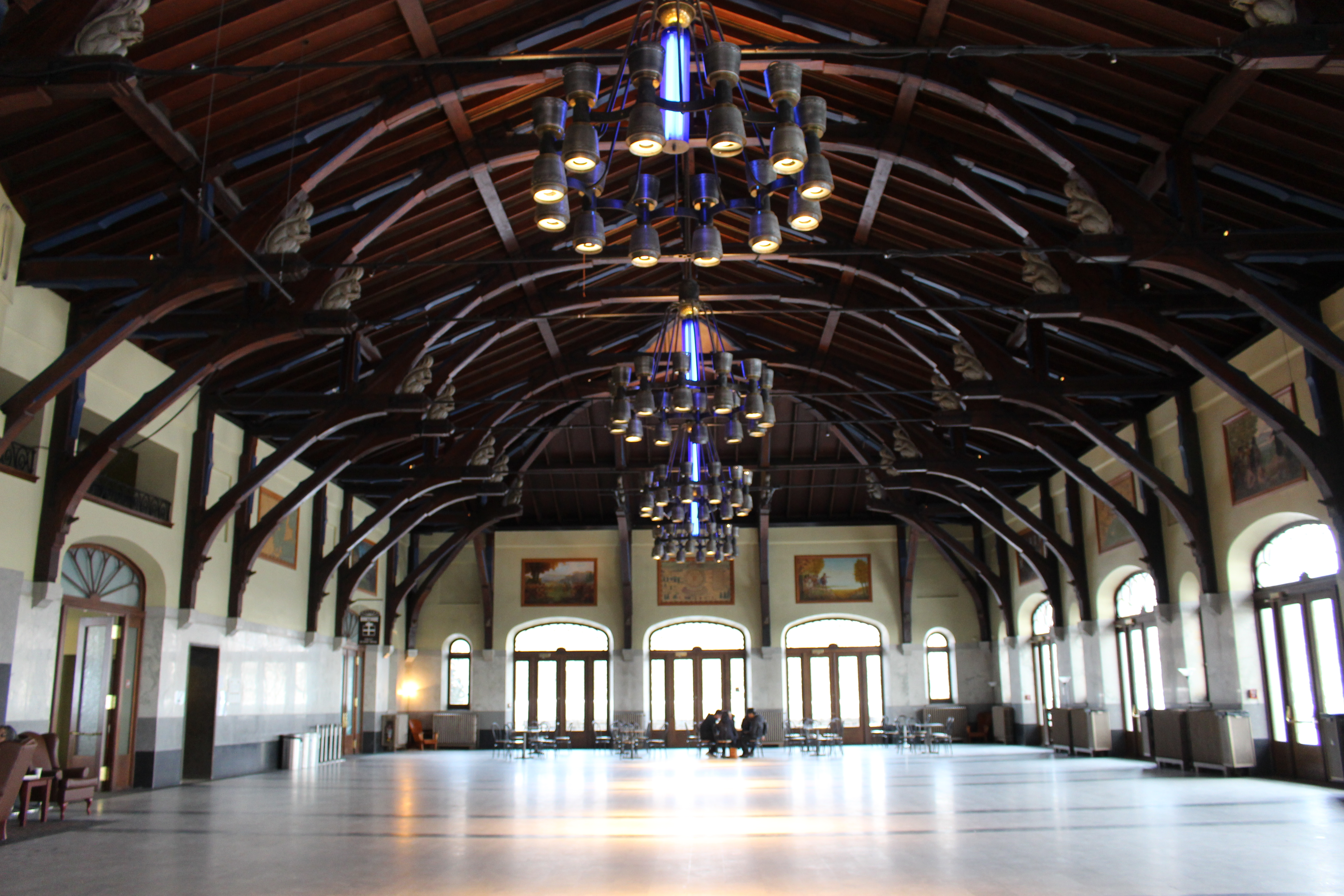
Interior of the Mount Royal Chalet

The building can host various events with room for 300 to 700 patrons. The southside of the building is a bricked courtyard and lookout with a view of Montreal's skyline from Mont-Royal.
