= Horace Baugh =

Canadian priest (1916–2007)

Horace Baugh (1916–2007) born in Arundel, Quebec, was an Anglican Canon priest who was famous for annual blessings of animals atop Mount Royal in Montreal.

Baugh studied theology at McGill University’s Diocesan College and was ordained a priest at Christ Church Cathedral in Fredericton in 1944. He began his ministry in New Brunswick, serving in the Miramichi region and in Grand Manan, Bay of Fundy.

Baugh conducted his blessings each year for 56 years, continuing after he went blind, until his death at the age of 91. He estimated that he blessed over 60,000 pets over the years, including dogs, cats, horses and snakes. Baugh was instrumental in founding the skier's chapel, St. Francis of the Birds in St. Sauveur des Monts in the Laurentian hills.
