= Tam-Tams =

Festival in Montreal, Quebec, Canada

Coordinates: 45°30′51″N 73°35′07″W

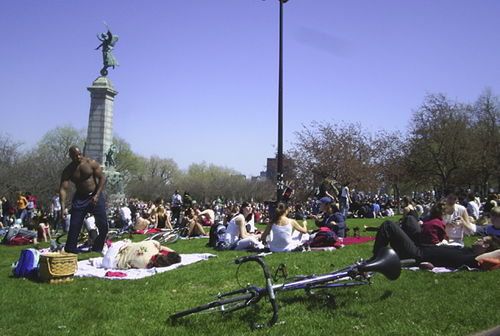
Tam-Tams with the George-Étienne Cartier Monument topped by a statue of a winged Liberty in the background.

The Tam-Tams is the informal name of a weekly free festival around the George-Étienne Cartier Monument in Mount Royal Park in Montreal, Quebec, Canada. Its name imitates the sound of drums and refers to the drum circles that form the focal points of the gathering.

== Events ==
Thousands of drum players, dancers, vendors and visitors come together every Sunday afternoon throughout the temperate months, occupying much of the open space on the eastern edge of Mount Royal Park. Jeanne-Mance Park (also known as Fletcher's Field), located directly across Avenue du Parc from where the Tam-Tams take place, serves as the city's main outdoor sporting ground. As such, the entire area is generally quite popular on Sundays in the summertime, drawing an exceptionally diverse crowd to myriad activities. The Tam-Tams typically start around 10:30am and continue until sunset. It is not an officially sanctioned nor sponsored event, simply a regular if technically spontaneous event. As such, it is difficult to pinpoint when it started or what motivated the first drum circle.

== History ==
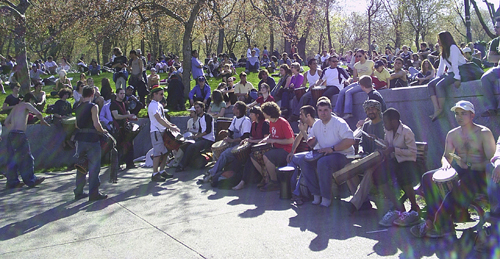
Drummers near base of the Cartier monument.

Spending Sundays in Mount Royal Park has been popular since the park was inaugurated in 1876, and the nature and design of Fletcher's Field has always made it a popular spot for picnics and sunbathers. Musical performances have been a staple since time immemorial, as brass bands, military and marching bands were popular entertainment until around the time of the Second World War. Moreover, the location of the Tam-Tams isn't too far from where Montreal's first permanent exposition hall, the Crystal Palace, was located. As such the location of the Tam-Tams is well rooted in the history of Montreal public life and festivities.

Anecdotal evidence suggests the first people to begin regular drumming at the base of the Cartier monument back in the mid-1960s was a group led by Don Hill. Don Hill was trying to gather people to give drumming lessons.

But it would be many years before the Tam-Tams became an element of the Montreal counter-culture scene. In this respect, anecdotal evidence suggests the Tam-Tams' origins date back to Saint Jean Baptiste Day 1976 when the City of Montreal located festivities related to the day entirely within the 'mountain domain'. In this case the mountain became a playground for the city's youth and counter-culture, with music throughout the day and many bonfires throughout the night. Damage to the park was so extreme the city would never again use the mountain for large-scale organized festivities.

== Present day ==
Today's Tam-Tams are still centred on the drum circle, but have evolved to also include artisanal vendors, DJs, performance artists, exhibitionists and a battle-royal for fantasy role players.

Because of the 'laissez-faire' attitude that characterizes the festivities, drug dealing, drug use and public drinking are tolerated to a degree. The Tam-Tams is strongly associated with cannabis culture, and though Montreal police are generally present they tend to disregard consumption of alcohol and cannabis. The general rule observed by Montrealers and respected by the police is discretion, moderation and not consuming in view of children.

== See also ==
- Drum circle
- Hand drum
