= Mount Royal Cross =

Monument in Montreal, Quebec, Canada

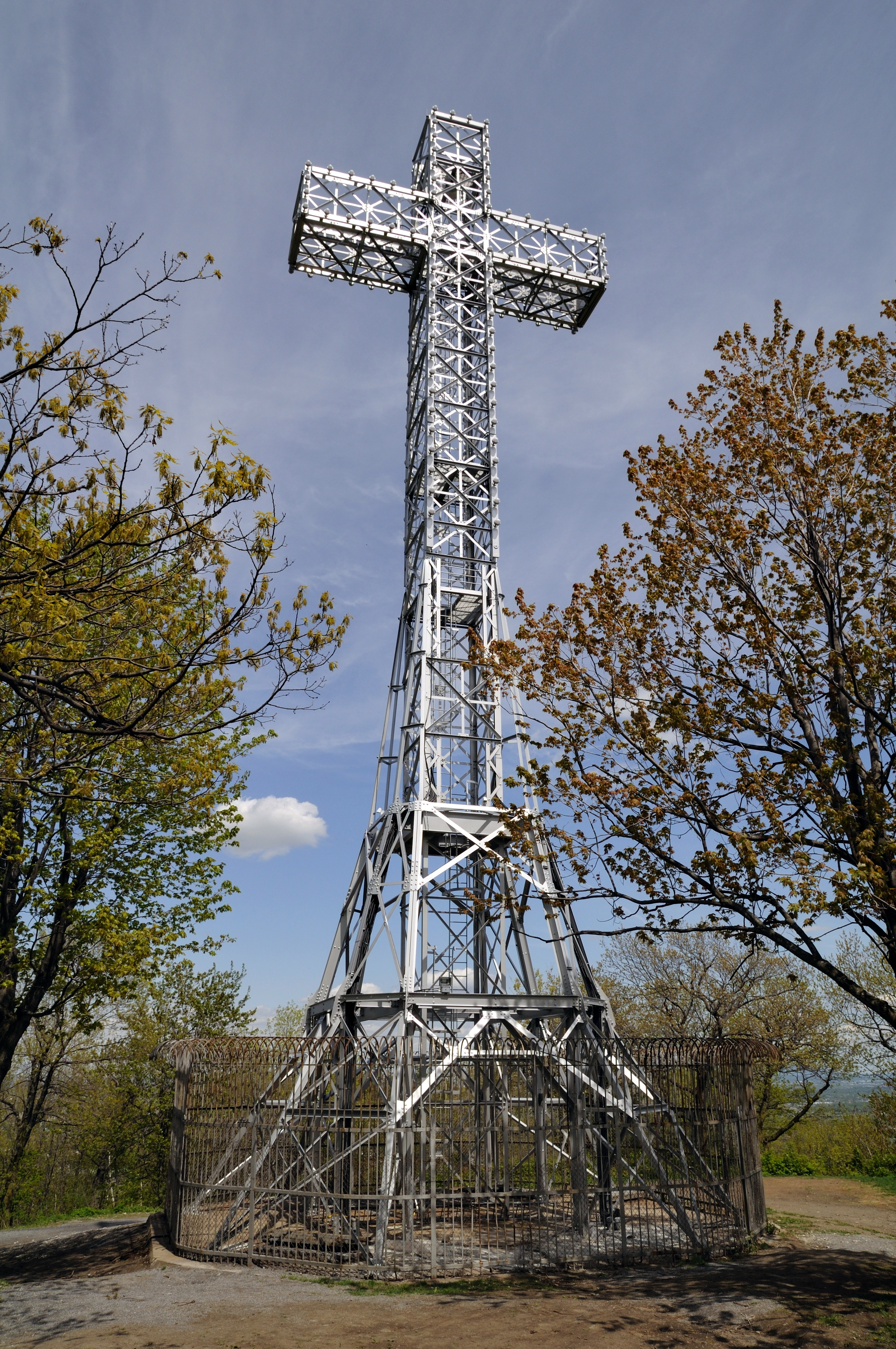
- Daytime image (pre-renovation)
- Interactive map of Mount Royal Cross
- Location: Mount Royal
- Coordinates: 45°30′32″N 73°35′16″W
- Material: steel
- Width: 11 metres (36 ft)
- Height: 31.4 metres (103 ft)
- Beginning date: May 16, 1924
- Completion date: Mid-September 1924

The Mount Royal Cross is a monument on top of Mount Royal in Montreal, Quebec, Canada. It stands at the northeastern peak of the mountain and overlooks the eastern part of the Island of Montreal.

== History ==
Paul Chomedey de Maisonneuve, founder of Fort Ville-Marie, erected the first cross on Mount Royal in 1643, thereby fulfilling his vow to the Virgin Mary in his prayers to end a disastrous flood.

An illuminated cross was installed in 1924 by the Société Saint-Jean-Baptiste and was given to the city in 1929. The city assumed responsibility for maintenance and operation of the cross since then, but there is no documentation supporting the transaction prior to June 2004, when the Montreal City Council approved cessation of the monument.

The city also took advantage of this to perform additional work to improve access to the site and install new park furniture. The renovation cost Can$2 million, paid by the City and the Ministère de la culture, des communications et de la condition féminine.

The cross is made of steel and consists of 1,830 pieces joined by 6,000 rivets weighing 26 tons. It is 31.4 metres tall, its arms span 11 metres, and it stands 252 metres above the St. Lawrence River. Following the latest renovation, it is lit by 158 18-LED bulbs.

While the cross is usually lit in white, the LED system allows it to be any colour, including the purple traditionally used between the death and election of a new Pope. Before the installation of the fibre-optic lighting, the purple illumination was accomplished by changing all the light bulbs. It is now controlled by computer. On various occasions, the cross has been turned red for AIDS awareness and blue for Saint-Jean-Baptiste Day. The resignation of Pope Benedict XVI presented a bit of a dilemma for how the cross would be lit; it was later announced that the cross would be lit in white during the interregnum preceding the election of Pope Francis on March 13, 2013.

On March 28, 2009, it was turned off for an hour to mark Earth Hour.

It is a common misconception that by law, no buildings in Montreal are to be higher than the Mount Royal Cross. However, this is incorrect as it is the height of Mount Royal itself that municipal regulations prohibit buildings from exceeding.

== Time capsule ==
Next to the cross, a plaque marks the emplacement of a time capsule buried in 1992, during Montreal's 350th birthday celebration. It contains messages and drawings from 12,000 children, depicting their visions for the city in the year 2142, when it is scheduled to be opened on the 500th anniversary of the founding of Montreal.
