= Church of St. Michael and St. Anthony =

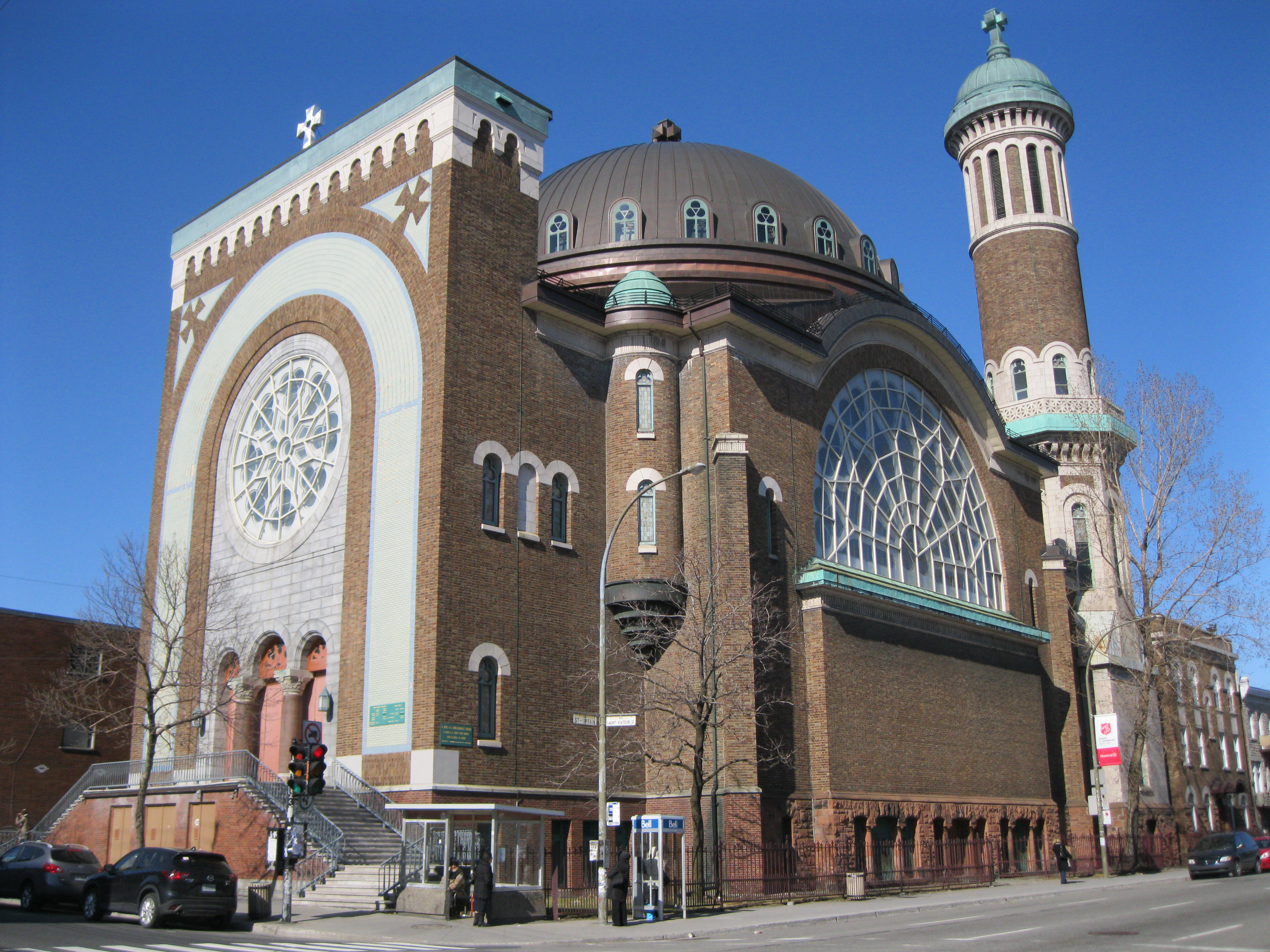
- Church of St. Michael and St. Anthony
- 45.5246°N 73.6005°W
- Location: 5580 St-Urbain street, Montreal, Quebec
- Country: CAN
- Denomination: Roman Catholic

History
- Former name: Church of St. Michael
- Status: active
- Founded: 1915

Architecture
- Style: Byzantine Revival architecture

Administration
- Division: Région Nord
- Diocese: Archdiocese of Montreal
- Parish: St. Michael and St. Anthony

Clergy
- Pastor(s): Rev. Jacek Mikulski, SAC

The Church of St. Michael and St. Anthony is a Roman Catholic church located in Mile End, Montreal. It was originally built as the Church of St. Michael and frequented by Irish Catholics. The growth of the Polish community in the area caused in 1964 for a Polish mission to be inaugurated in the church, whose name was expanded to "St. Michael and St. Anthony".

The church exemplifies cultural hybridity by being a Byzantine-styled church, built for Irish Catholics, in a multicultural neighbourhood, and being home today to mostly Poles and Italians. The church has also been noted for its Byzantine Revival architecture, complete with a dome and minaret-styled tower, and so is "one of the more unique examples of church architecture in Montréal."

== History ==
Construction on the Church of St. Michael the Archangel began in 1914 for what would grow to become the largest anglophone parish in Montreal. After a brief delay following the commencement of World War I, the church was completed in 1915 at a cost of $232,000 (equivalent to $6,244,984 in 2025), with a capacity of 1,400 people.

Though Mile End was home to a large Irish population when the church was built, the English-speaking Catholic population living nearby declined rapidly thereafter. Consequently, the Polish Franciscan mission was housed in the church in the 1960s. The Polish community grew such that the Polish and Irish communities of the church "merged into one," and to reflect that change, St. Anthony was appended to the parish name in 1969 from the "Conventual Franciscans' devotion to St. Anthony of Padua." Today, the church is "recognised as the focal point for the Polish Catholics of Montreal."

== Architecture ==
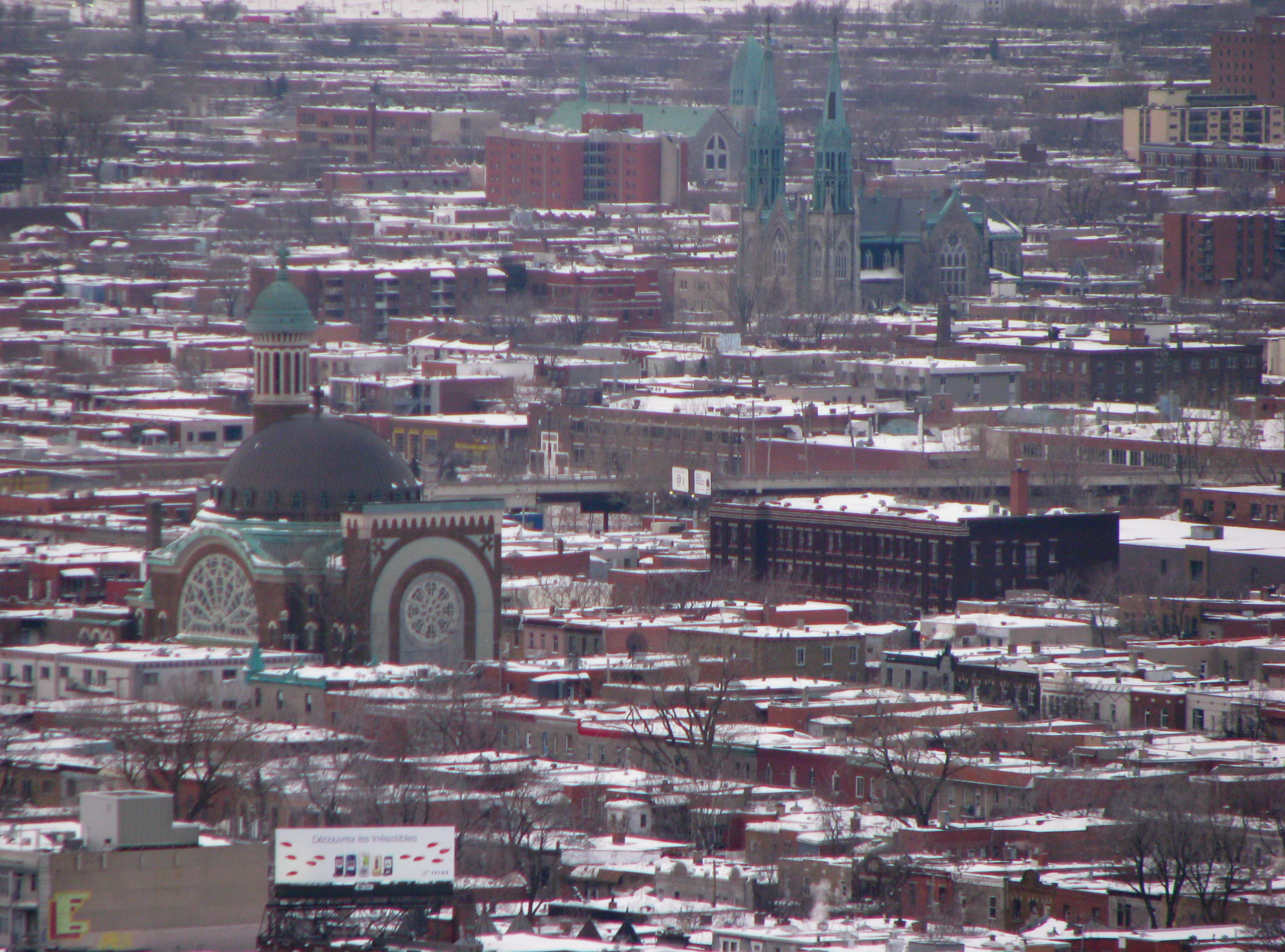
The Church of St. Michael and St. Anthony (left) seen from Mount Royal

The church was built in the Neo-Byzantine style of architecture, accompanied by a large turquoise dome and minaret-style tower. It was designed by architect Aristide Beaugrand-Champagne (1876–1950), who was inspired by the Hagia Sophia (originally an Eastern Orthodox basilica) in Istanbul (formerly Constantinople). The church also features elements of Gothic and Roman architecture, as well as lombard bands and window tracery reminiscent of Middle Ages castles.

The church's dome features one of the first uses of reinforced concrete in Quebec.

The interior roof of the dome features a neo-Renaissance-style fresco of St. Michael watching the fall of the angels, painted by the Italian-Canadian artist Guido Nincheri, who painted other churches in Montreal.

== Bibliography ==
- Simon, Sherry (1999). Hybriditée Culturelle. Montreal: L'Île de la tortue. ISBN 2-922369-02-1.
