= Mount Royal =

Small mountain in Montreal, Quebec, Canada

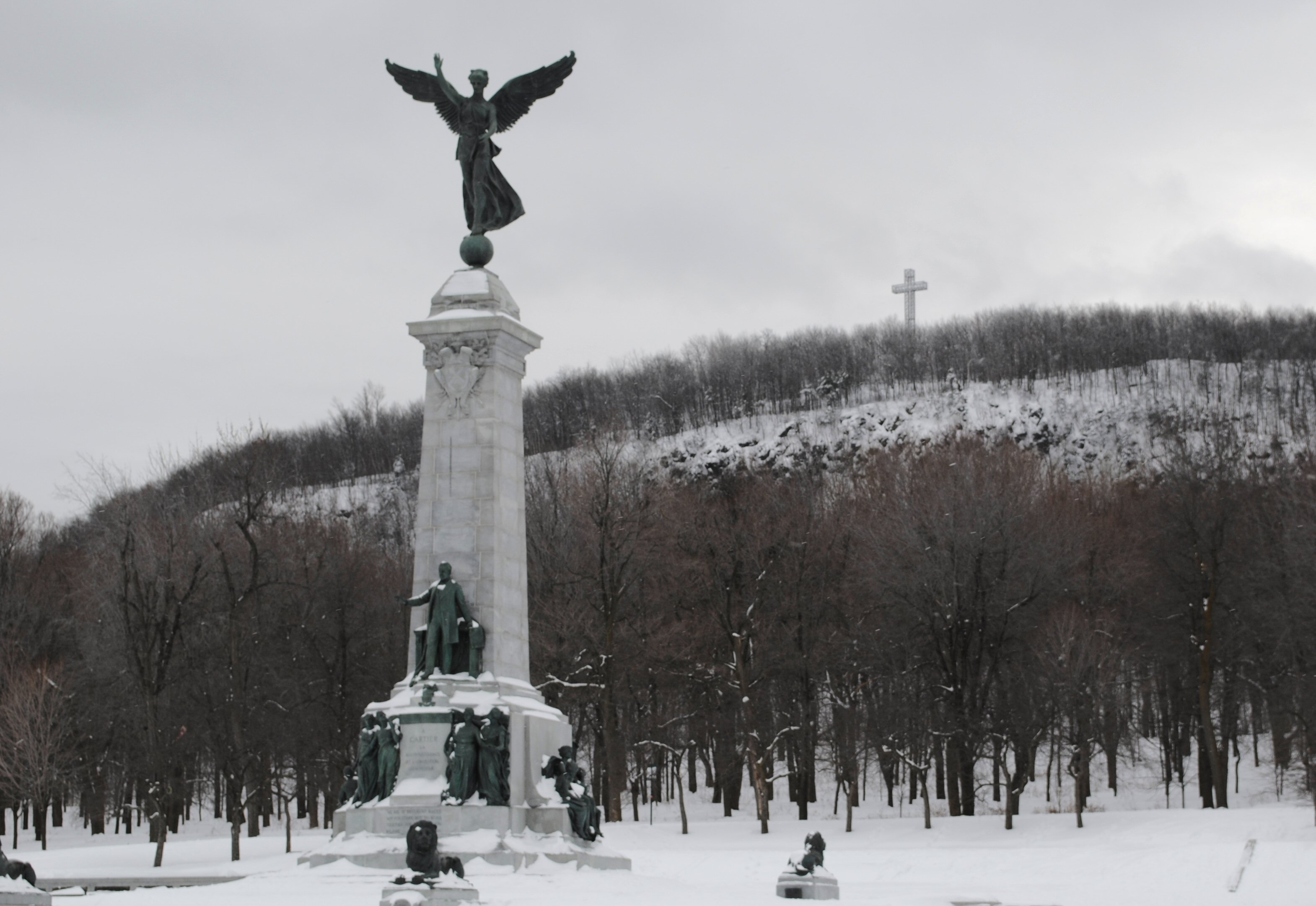
- George-Étienne Cartier Monument and Mount Royal's eastern slope in winter

Highest point
- Elevation: 233 m (764 ft)
- Prominence: 227 m (745 ft)
- Isolation: 32.68 km (20.31 mi)
- Coordinates: 45°30′23″N 73°35′20″W

Naming
- Native name: Mont Royal (French)

Geography
- Location within Quebec
- Country: Canada
- Province: Quebec
- City: Montréal
- Parent range: Monteregian Hills
- Topo map: NTS 31H12 Laval

Geology
- Rock age: Early Cretaceous
- Mountain type: Intrusive stock

Climbing
- First ascent: Jacques Cartier, 1535 (first European)
- Easiest route: Hike or Cycling

Mount Royal (French: Mont Royal, IPA: [mɔ̃ ʁwajal]) is a mountain in the city of Montreal, immediately west of Downtown Montreal, Quebec, Canada. The city's name is derived from its name.

The mountain is part of the Monteregian Hills , situated between the Laurentians and the Appalachian Mountains. It gave its Latin name, Mons Regius, to the Monteregian chain. The mountain consists of three peaks: Colline de la Croix (or Mont Royal proper) at 233 m (764 ft), Colline d'Outremont (or Mount Murray, in the borough of Outremont) at 211 m (692 ft), and Westmount Summit at 201 m (659 ft) elevation above mean sea level.

== Geology ==
Location of Mount Royal in Montreal.

Mount Royal is the deep extension of a vastly eroded ancient volcanic complex, which was probably active about 125 million years ago.

The hill, along with the other mountains of the Monteregian Hills, was formed when the North American Plate moved westward over the New England hotspot. By a process known as intrusion, magma intruded into the sedimentary rocks underneath the area, producing at least eight igneous stocks. The main rock type is a gabbro composed of pyroxene, olivine and variable amounts of plagioclase. During and after the main stage of intrusion, the gabbros and surrounding rocks were intruded by a series of volcanic dikes and sills. Subsequently, the surrounding softer sedimentary rock was eroded, leaving behind the resistant igneous rock that forms the hill.

The mineral montroyalite, discovered in Montreal, is named after the hill that provided the definition sample.

== History ==
Mount Royal was a longtime gathering point for First Nations peoples including the Mohawk. The village of Hochelaga was located on the mountain, serving as a major trading center and destination. A fire beacon on one of Mount Royal's three peaks, Tiohtià:ke Otsira’kéhne, guided canoes to a nearby beach.

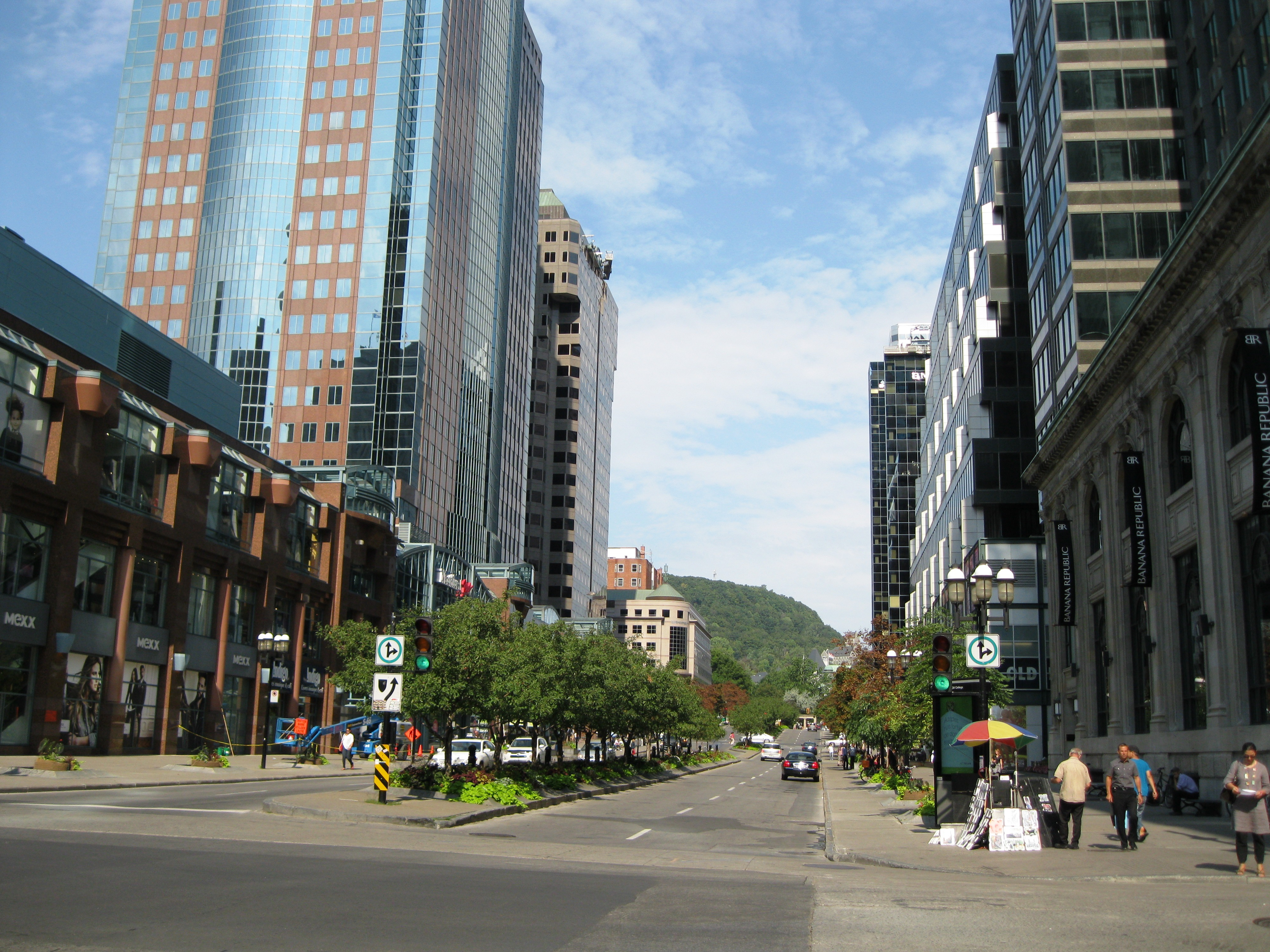
McGill College Avenue going from Downtown Montreal to Mount Royal.

The first European to scale the hill was Jacques Cartier, guided there in 1535 by residents of Hochelaga. He named it in honour of his patron, Francis I of France. He wrote in his journal: "And among these fields is situated and seated the said town of Hochelaga, near to and adjoining a mountain. [...] We named this mountain Mount Royal."

One theory is that the name of the Island of Montréal derives from Mont Réal, as the hill's name was spelled in Middle French (Mont Royal in Modern French). However, Cartier's 1535 diary entry refers to "le mont Royal." Another argument, mentioned by the Government of Canada on its website concerning Canadian place names, is that the name Montréal was adopted because a Venetian map from 1556 used the Italian name of the hill, "Monte Real." The name was first applied to the island and was unofficially applied to the city, formerly named Ville-Marie, by the 18th century.

In 1643, Paul de Chomedey, Sieur de Maisonneuve made a pilgrimage to the top of the hill to fulfill a vow made in the winter season on occasion of a great flood that swept up to the town palisades.

=== Development ===
Montrealers had wanted to build a park on Mount Royal since at least 1857, but the first city commitment to buy land and create a park started in 1868. The park was inaugurated on May 24, 1876.

In 1876, land owner and farmer James Swail began planning residential subdivisions on the western slope of Mount Murray, in what is now the Côte-des-Neiges district. In 1906, a large housing development was started in the area, called Northmount Heights, with homes built along what is now Decelles Street by developer Northmount Land Company. Much of this area has since been expropriated by the Université de Montréal.

In 1914–1918, the Mount Royal Tunnel was dug under the hill by the Canadian Northern Railway, a predecessor of the Canadian National Railway. It is currently used by the Réseau express métropolitain.

=== Morality Cuts of the 1950s ===
By the 1950s, a wooded area in the northeastern section of the park became known as the Jungle. Marginalized groups used the overgrown space, and it became a major cruising spot for gay men who faced homophobia in other Montreal social spaces. However, a 1954 sociological study of gay Montrealers publicized their use of the area, leading to increased surveillance of the Jungle community.

Public opposition to the space also increased due to a wave of morality campaigns in 1954 following a series of crimes against children in the city, including some in the Jungle and park. The local English-language press condemned the Jungle as a space for sexual activity, alcohol, and crime near a children's playground. Politicians decided to cut down the forest there and redesign the area, initiating the Morality Cuts of the 1950s. The lost forest earned Mount Royal the nicknames "Bald Mountain" and "Mount Baldy". It also caused soil erosion and the introduction of more non-native species.

=== Modern events ===
The area was briefly considered as a candidate for the site of Expo 67 before the exposition grounds were ultimately built on adjoining islands in the Saint Lawrence River.

The hilly roads of the park have been used for cycle racing since the 1970s, hosting the 1974 UCI Road Cycling World Championships, the individual road race cycling event at the 1976 Summer Olympics, and the subsequent annual races of Coupe du Monde Cycliste Féminine de Montréal (1998–2009) and Grand Prix Cycliste de Montréal (2010–present).

After the Ice Storm of 1998, 5,000 damaged trees were cut from Mount Royal. In 2018, the park planned to cut 4,000 ash trees due to emerald ash borer infestation.

== Geography ==
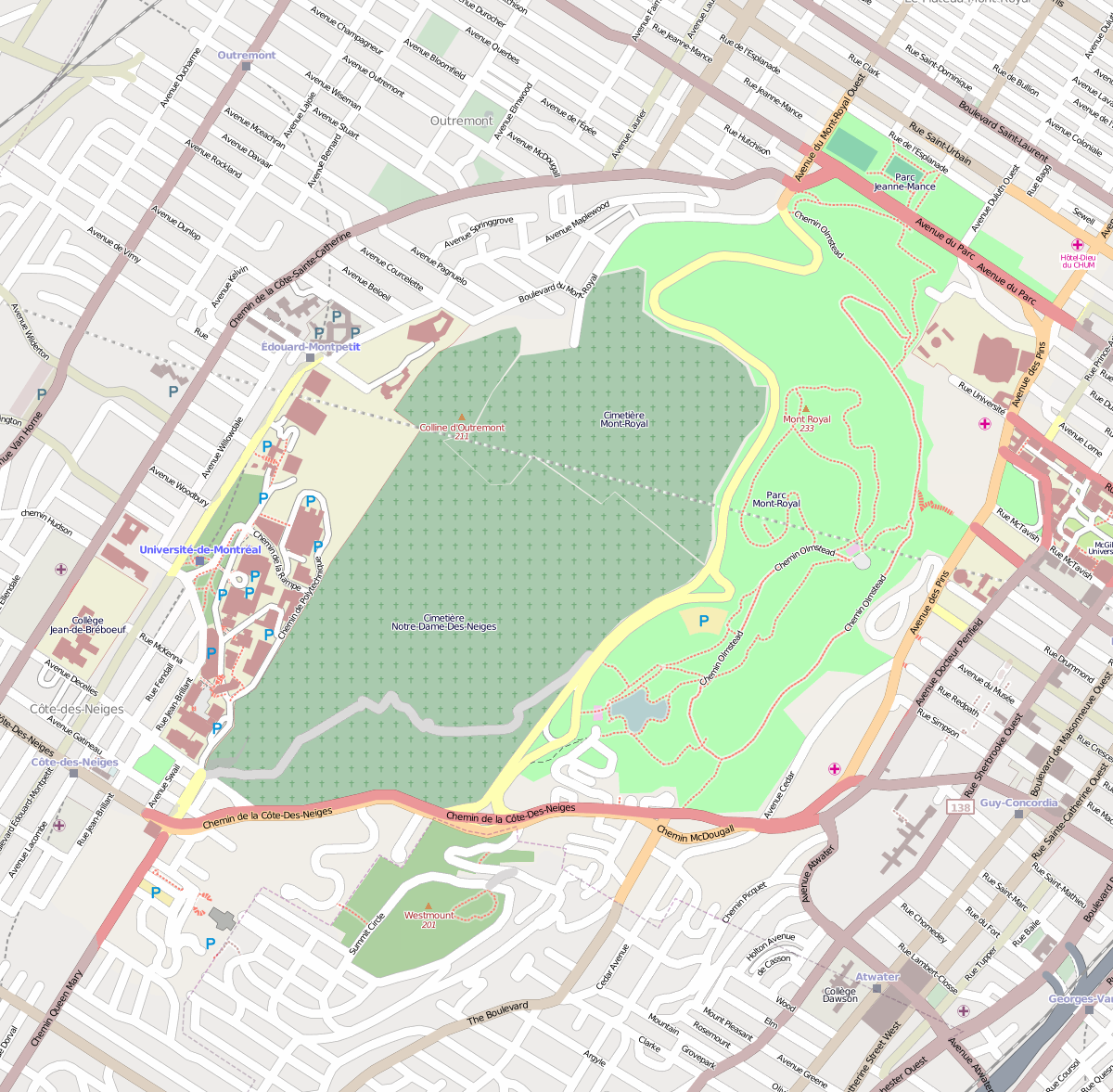
Map of Mount Royal.

=== Topography ===
Mount Royal is about 4 kilometres (2 1/2 miles) east to west and 2.5 kilometres (1 1/2 miles) north to south. The hill emerges from the plains occupied by Montreal and neighbouring regions.

=== Road networks ===
Two roads cross the territory:

- The Camillien Houde Way (named Remembrance Road on part of its route)
- Côte-des-Neiges Road

== Natural heritage ==
=== Fauna ===
Mount Royal is home to many animal species including gray squirrel, raccoon, fox, marmot, striped skunk, bee and various species of birds.

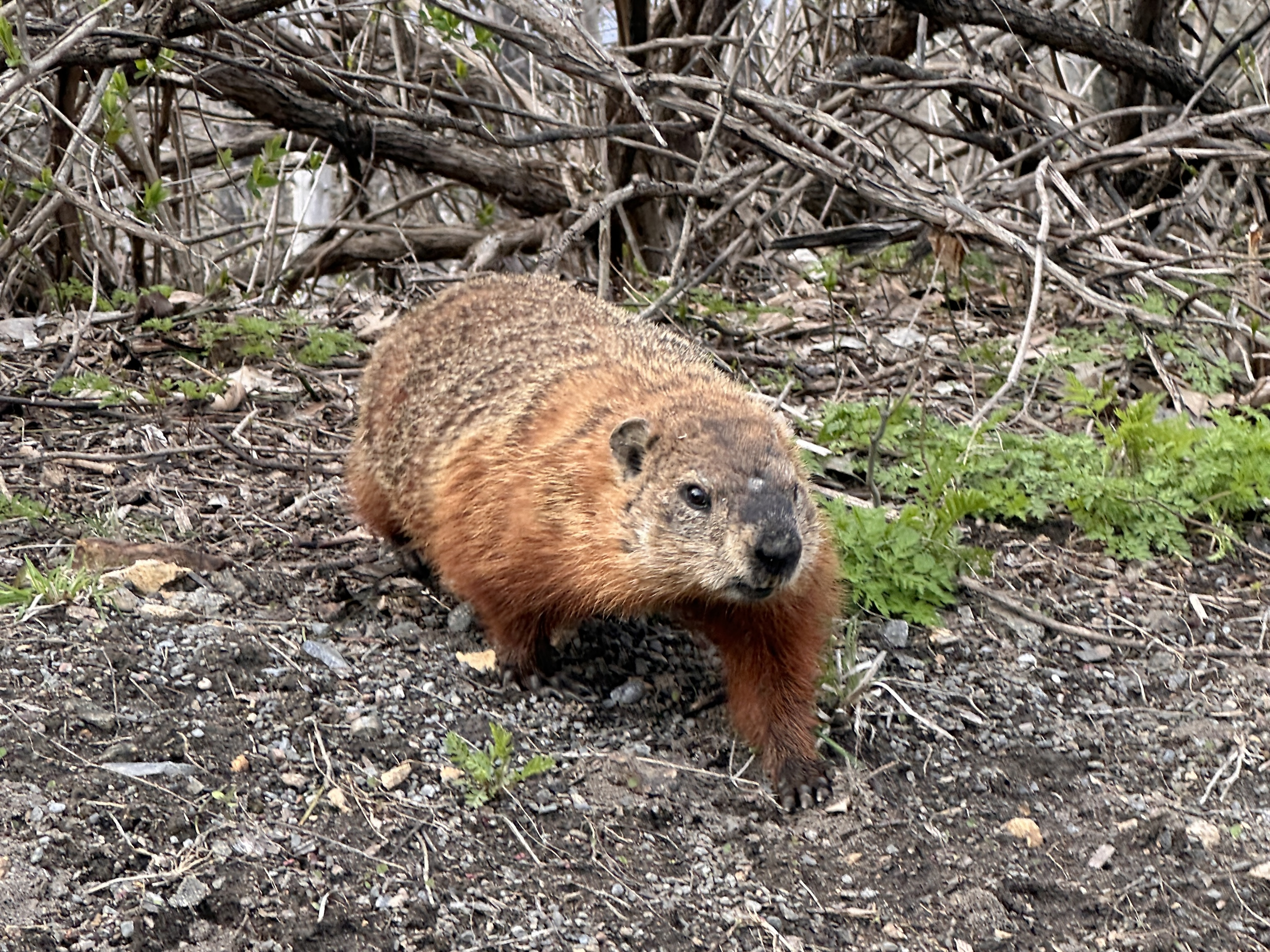
Marmot in Parc du Mont Royal in Montreal, QC

=== Flora ===
From the point of view of the flora, the hill shelters a set of natural spaces and semi-natural rich in trees, shrubs and herbaceous plants

== Mount Royal Cross ==
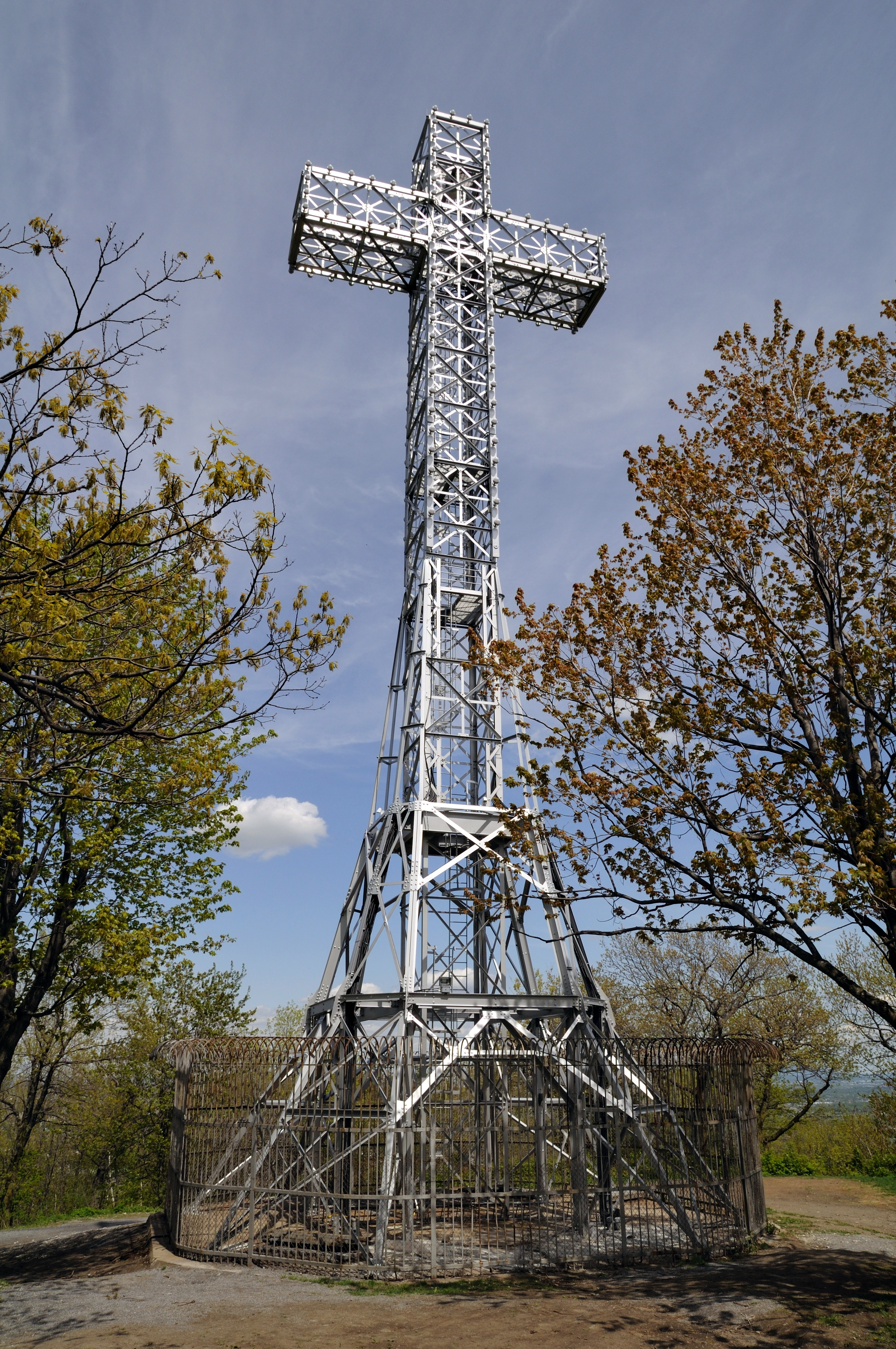
Cross on top of Mount Royal during daytime.

The first Mount Royal Cross was placed there in 1643 by Paul Chomedey de Maisonneuve, the founder of the city, in fulfillment of a vow he made to the Virgin Mary when praying to her to stop a disastrous flood. Today, the hill is crowned by a 31.4-metre-high (103 ft) illuminated cross, installed in 1924 by the Société Saint-Jean-Baptiste and now owned by the city. It was converted to fibre-optic light in 1992, and then to LEDs in 2009. The cross is usually lit in white, but can now be changed to any colour, including the purple traditionally used upon the death of a pope.

Beside the cross, a plaque marks the placement of a time capsule in 1992, during Montréal's 350th birthday celebration. It contains messages and drawings from 12,000 children, depicting their visions for the city in the year 2142, when the capsule is scheduled to be opened.

== Mount Royal Park ==
Mount Royal Park
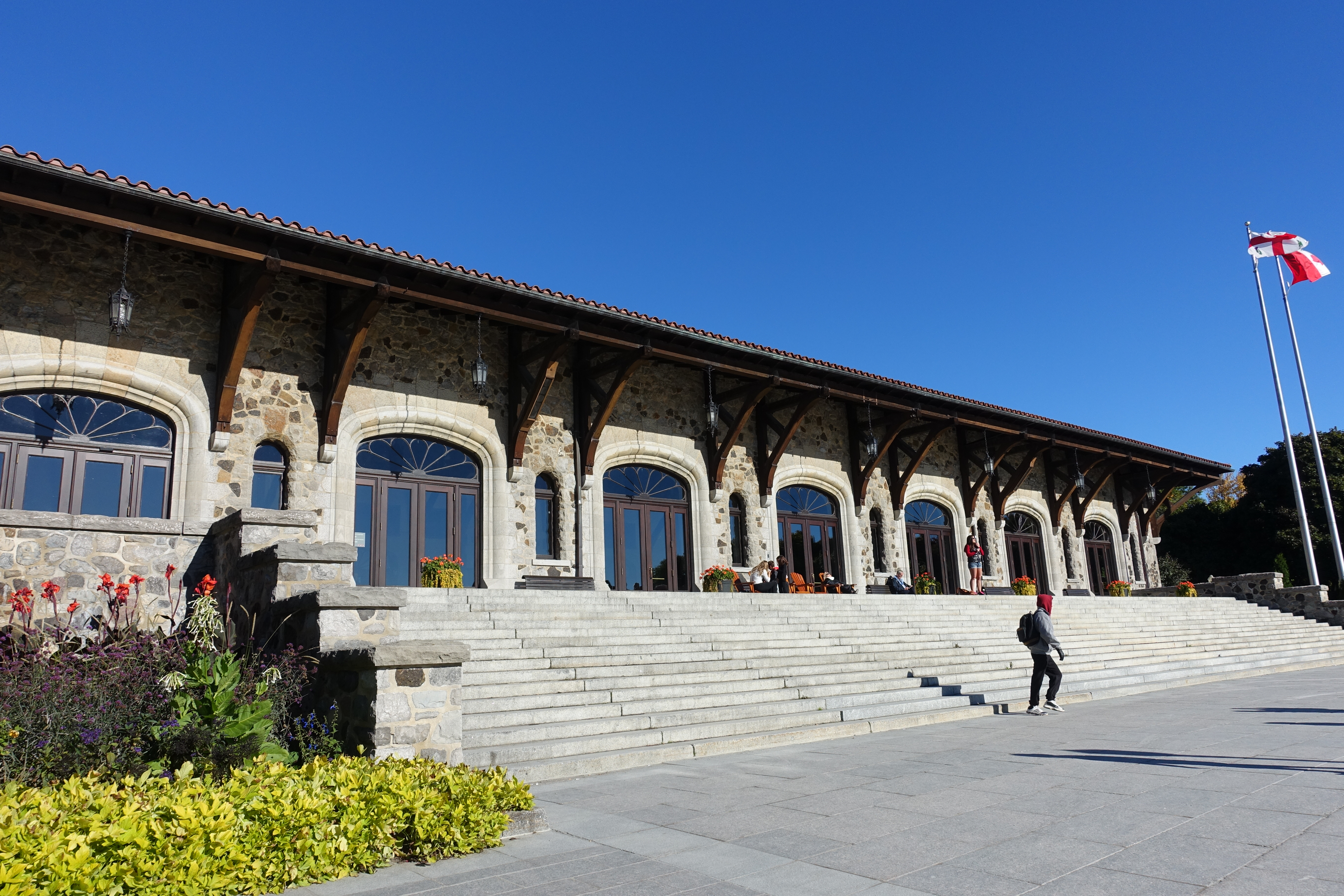
- Mount Royal Chalet, Kondiaronk Belvedere, part of the Mount Royal Park.
- Interactive map of Mount Royal Park
- Type: Municipal
- Location: Montreal
- Coordinates: 45°30′23″N 73°35′20″W
- Area: 280 ha (692 acres)
- Created: 1876
- Operator: City of Montreal
- Status: Open all year
- Public transit: STM Bus: 11, 80, 129, 165, 365, 480 and 711

The hill is the site of Mount Royal Park (French: Parc du Mont-Royal), one of Montreal's largest greenspaces. The park was originally designed by Frederick Law Olmsted (who also co-designed New York City's Central Park) and was inaugurated in 1876, although not completed to his design.

Olmsted had planned to emphasize the mountainous topography through the use of vegetation. Shade trees at the bottom of the carriage path would resemble a valley. As the visitor went higher, the vegetation would get more sparse to give the illusion of exaggerated height. However, Montreal suffered a depression in the mid-1870s and many of Olmsted's plans were abandoned. The carriage way was built, but it was done hastily and without regards to the original plan. None of the vegetation choices were followed.

The park contains two belvederes, the more prominent of which is the Kondiaronk Belvedere, a semicircular plaza with a Mount Royal Chalet overlooking Downtown Montreal. Built in 1906, it is named for the Petun chief Kondiaronk, whose influence led to the Great Peace of Montreal in 1701.

Other features of the park are Beaver Lake (a small artificial lake), a snow tube and toboggan run, cross-country skiing trails, a sculpture garden and Smith House, an interpretive centre. At the foot of the hill, overlooking Park Avenue, the park features the George-Étienne Cartier Monument (home to the Tam-Tams) and a gazebo (more properly, a bandstand) which has been named in honour of Mordecai Richler.

The lush forest has been badly damaged, both by Mayor Drapeau's so-called morality cuts of the 1950s and by the Ice Storm of 1998, but has since largely recovered. The forest is a green jewel rising above downtown Montreal and is known for its beautiful autumn foliage as well as its extensive hiking and cross-country ski trails. Biking is restricted to the main gravel roads.

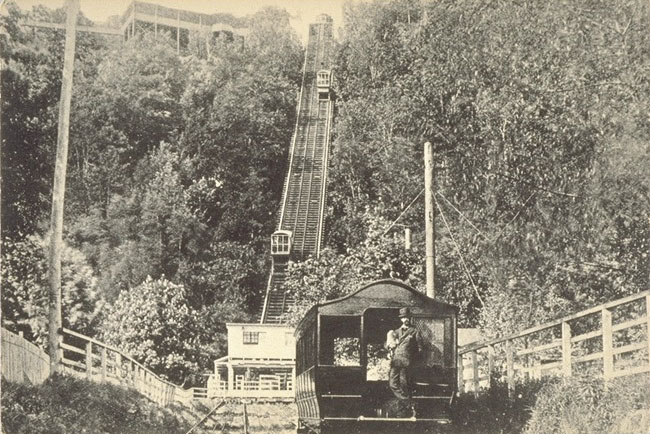
Mount Royal Funicular Railway, around 1900.

From 1885 to 1920, the Mount Royal Funicular Railway brought sightseers to its peak. After it ceased service, Montreal's No. 11 streetcar brought visitors to the peak until 1959. A roadway named for longtime but controversial former mayor Camillien Houde now bisects the hill, although Houde had been opposed to the idea of putting a road through the park.

The park, cemeteries, and several adjacent parks and institutions have been combined into the Mount Royal Natural and Historical District (Arrondissement historique et naturel du Mont-Royal) by the provincial government in order to legally protect the rich cultural and natural heritage of the region.

=== Parc Tiohtià:ke Otsira'kéhne ===
In June 2017, during the 375th anniversary of Montreal, the city formally named the greenspace surrounding the Outremont peak Parc Tiohtià:ke Otsira'kéhne, Mohawk for "the place of the big fire," reflecting how the hill had been used for a fire beacon by First Nations people. It has an area of 35 hectares (86 acres).

=== Wintertime ===
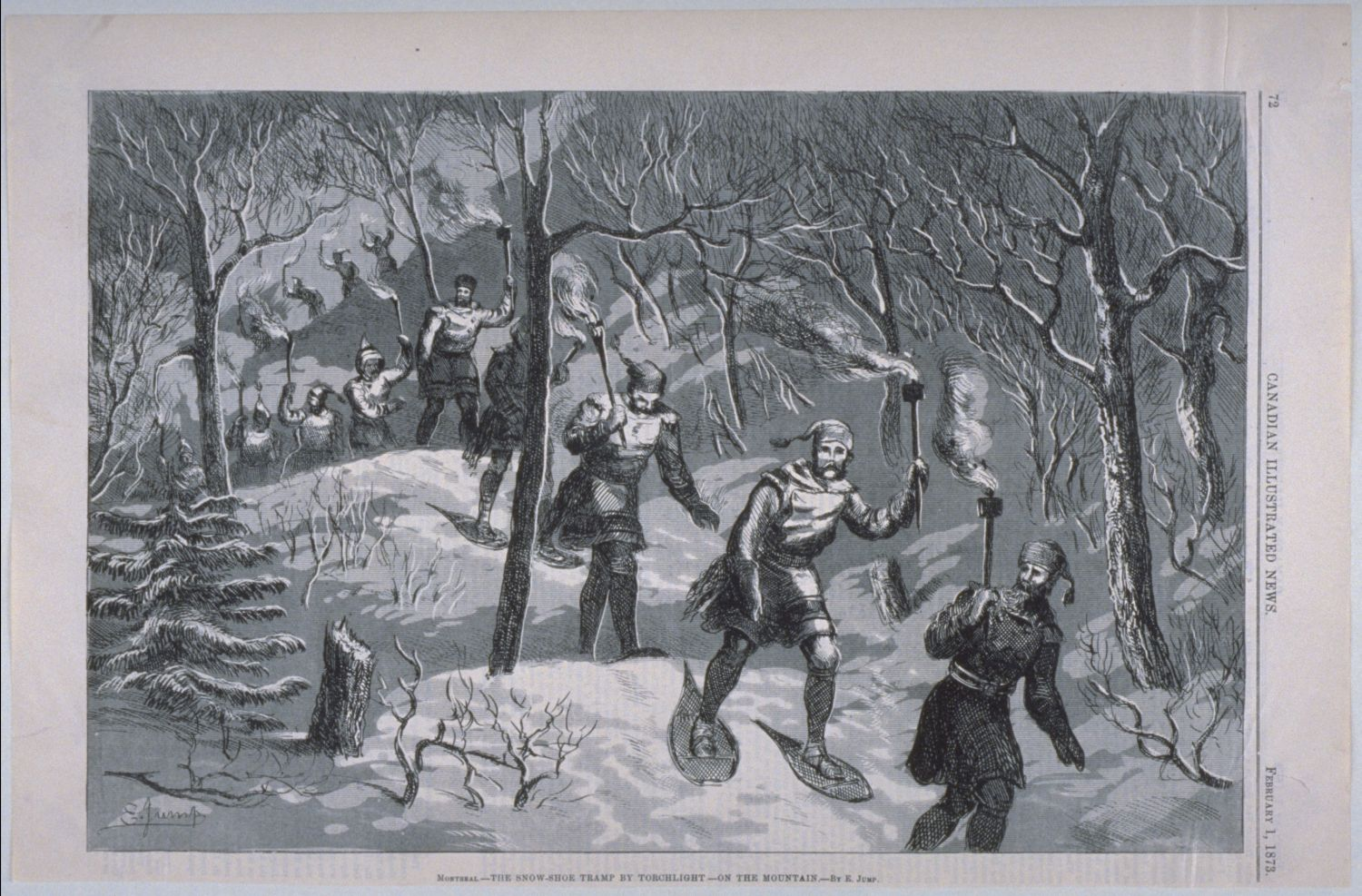
Night procession by the Montreal Snow Shoe Club on Mount Royal, 1873.

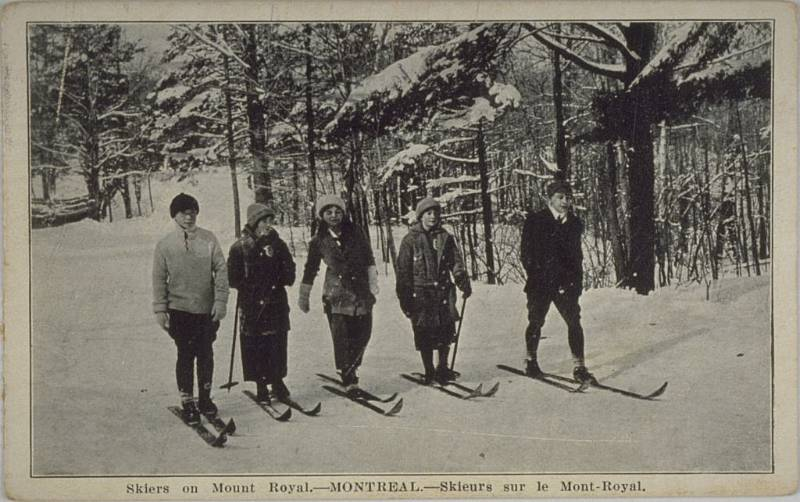
Cross-country skiing on Mount Royal in the 1920s.

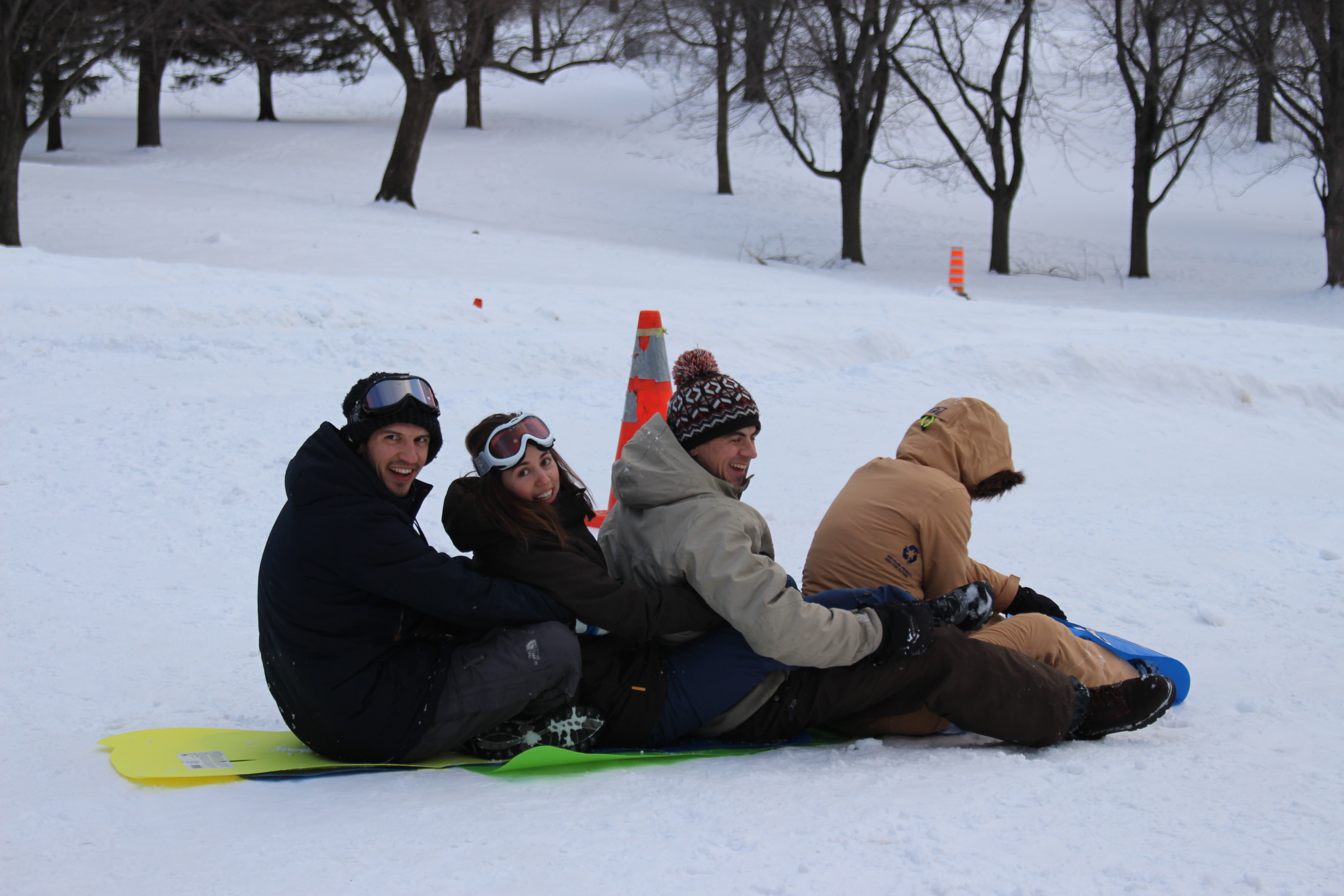
People come to Mount Royal for tobogganning on the former ski slopes.

Mount Royal Park currently hosts a snow tube and toboggan run on one of the former alpine ski slopes, as well as 7 groomed cross-country ski and snowshoe trails which total 18 km (11 mi), with equipment rental available onsite.

One of the most popular activities to do on Beaver Lake is to skate; this activity is free if one brings their own equipment.

The former alpine ski slope featured a T-bar and a 100-foot (30.5 m) drop. Mechanical lift devices were first installed in Mount Royal Park in 1945. In the 1940s, there were two and a half miles of ski slopes available. A ski shop was first installed in the park in 1938. Prior to that, in the 1920s, one of the best ski jumps in Canada was the one on Mount Royal, near Côte-des-Neiges.

Founded in 1840, the now-defunct Montreal Snow Shoe Club, with members drawn from some of Montreal's prominent businessmen, would meet each week during the winter at nightfall on Sherbrooke Street near McGill College Avenue to snowshoe through Mount Royal Park, lit by torchlight. Club members began wearing blue tuques on their outings around 1870. Recently, the tradition has been revived as the Tuques Bleues celebration by the Les amis de la montagne, a charitable organization that works to protect and preserve the park.

=== Tam-Tams ===
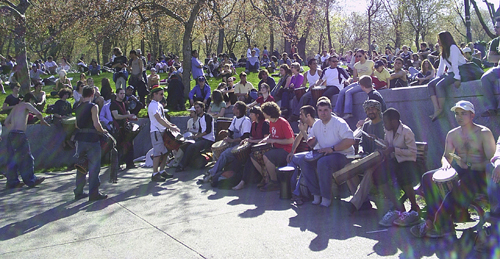
Mount Royal's Tam-Tams gathering.

In the summer, Mount Royal hosts a popular activity known as Tam-Tams, or the "Tam-Tam Jam", whereby a number of Montrealers and visitors play hand drums (such as djembes) on the east slope of the hill, near the George-Étienne Cartier Monument. The Sunday afternoon gatherings attract people of various backgrounds. Often, dozens of tam-tam players perform their art at the same time, encouraging others to dance. In addition, many children and adults participate nearby in a battle with foam-padded weapons.

The Tam-tams began in the late 1970s with a workshop on African drumming at a jazz bar on Ontario Street. It is not organized by the municipal authorities. Despite initial resistance by participants, the city now intervenes in the event, restricting commercial activity to registered members in designated areas and assigning police and first aid technicians to ensure the safety of those present. Although initially controversial in light of the event's communal and countercultural vibe (as well as a permissive attitude towards then-illegal cannabis use), the police presence has not led to conflict.

=== Jeanne-Mance Park ===
Facing the hill across Park Avenue is Jeanne-Mance Park. A popular recreational area, Jeanne-Mance Park features a playground, a wading pool, tennis courts, various sports fields, and in winter, a skating rink.

== Transmission tower ==
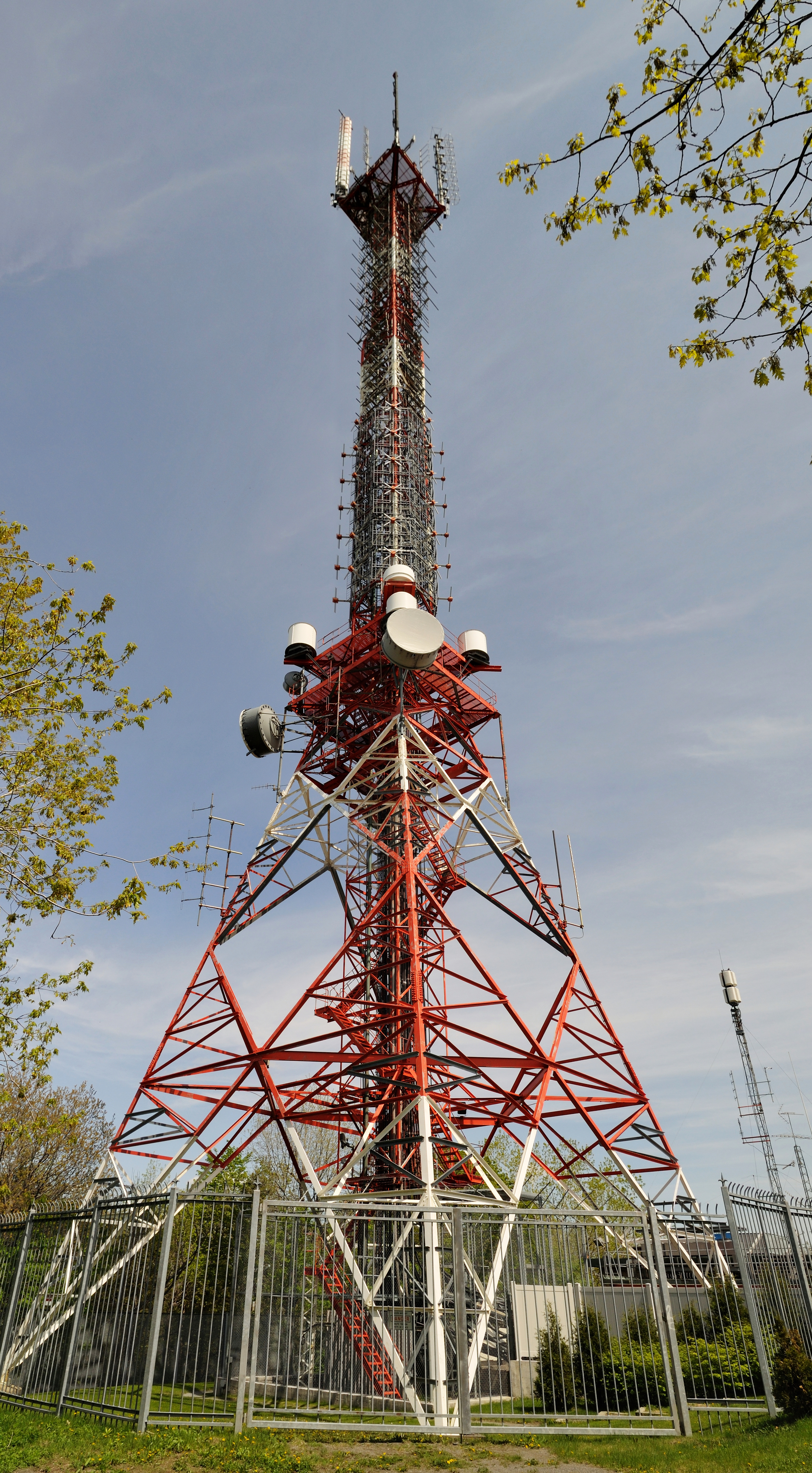
Mount Royal transmitter tower

The park is also home to the CBC's Mount Royal transmitter facility, which comprises two large buildings: one used primarily by the CBC for its 2 Montreal stations, CBMT-DT and CBFT-DT, and one used by the private television stations. There is also a short (about 100 m (328 ft)) candelabra tower, from which nearly all of Montreal's television and FM radio stations broadcast. Because of the proximity of this tower to public areas of the park, in recent years significant concerns have been raised about radio-frequency radiation exposure; at several points formerly accessible to park users near the tower, radiation was found to be significantly higher than that permitted for the general public.

The "shortness" indicated above was dictated by the maximum allowable height (1100 feet above sea level) dictated by the federal Department of Transport because of the proximity to the flight path to Trudeau Airport nearby. The engineering challenge was to combine all the desired antennas in the limited space between the top of the hill and 1100 feet above sea level, which led to the "candelabra" design.

== Adjacent landmarks ==
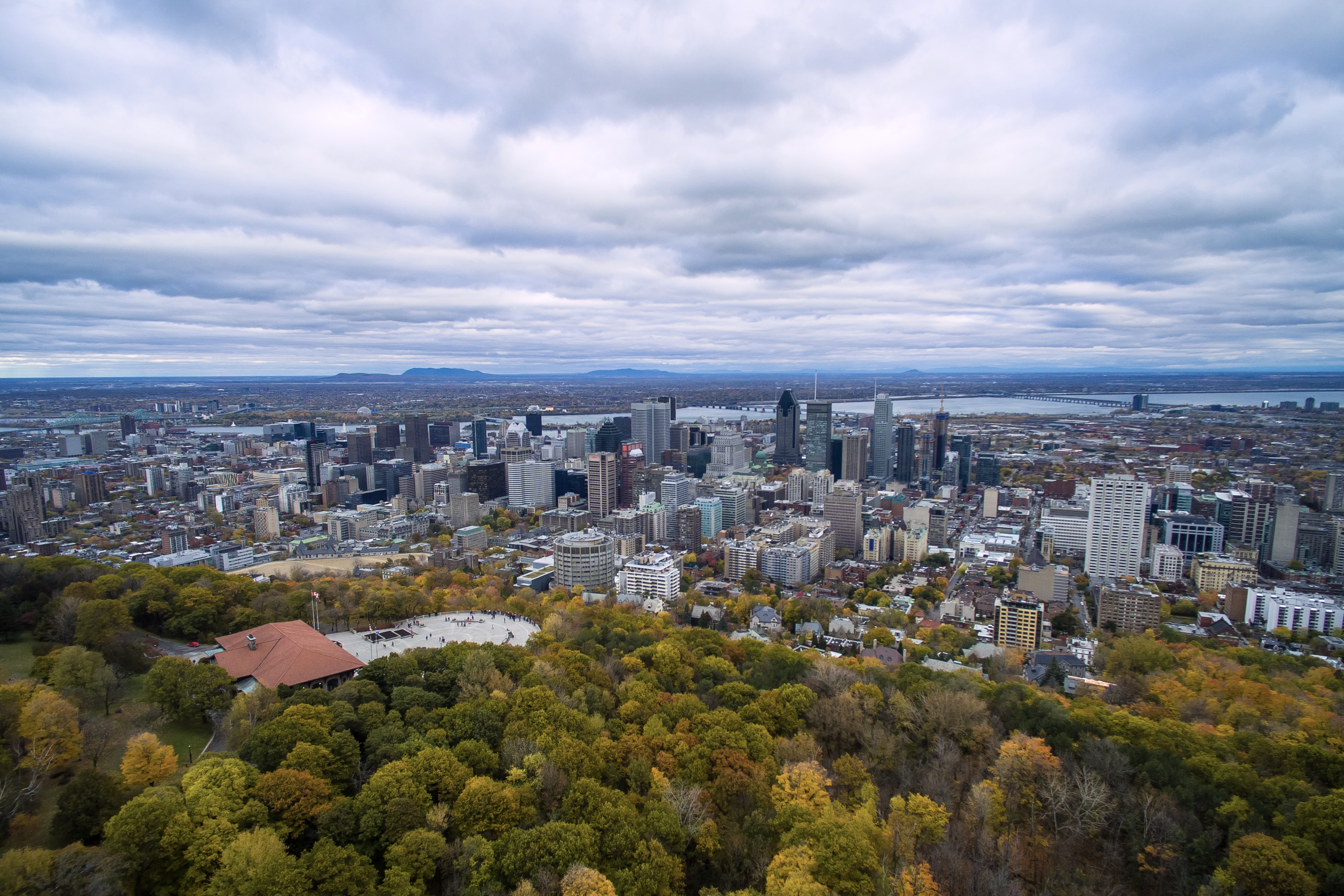
Aerial view of Downtown Montreal as seen from above Mount Royal.

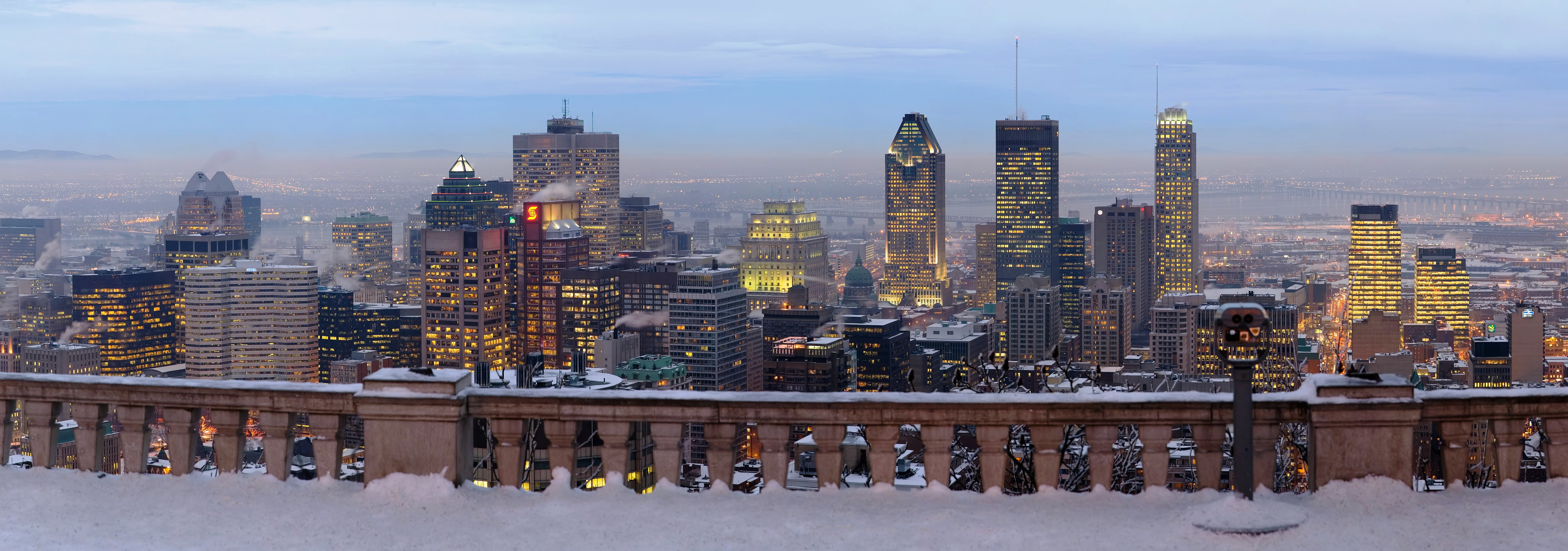
The view of Downtown Montreal from the Kondiaronk Belvedere and the Chalet du Mont Royal in winter.

Outside the park, Mount Royal's slopes are also home to such Montreal landmarks as Saint Joseph's Oratory, Canada's largest church; McGill University; the Montreal General Hospital; McGill's Molson Stadium, home to the CFL's Montreal Alouettes; the McTavish reservoir; Université de Montréal; the École Polytechnique de Montréal; the Îlot-Trafalgar-Gleneagles historic block; and some well-off residential neighbourhoods such as Upper Westmount and Upper Outremont. In 2024, Elie-Wiesel Park was inaugurated on de Courtrai Avenue near Décarie Boulevard and Westbury Avenue in the Snowdon district in Côte-des-Neiges–Notre-Dame-de-Grâce in honour of Elie Wiesel, the Holocaust survivor, writer, professor, and Nobel Peace Prize winner; it has a playground, relaxation area, walking trails, furniture, green spaces, and unique water features.

== See also ==
- Horace Baugh
- Holy Mountain, a National Film Board of Canada website devoted to the hill
- Royal eponyms in Canada
