= George-Étienne Cartier Monument =

Monument in Montreal, Quebec, Canada

Sir George-Étienne Cartier Monument
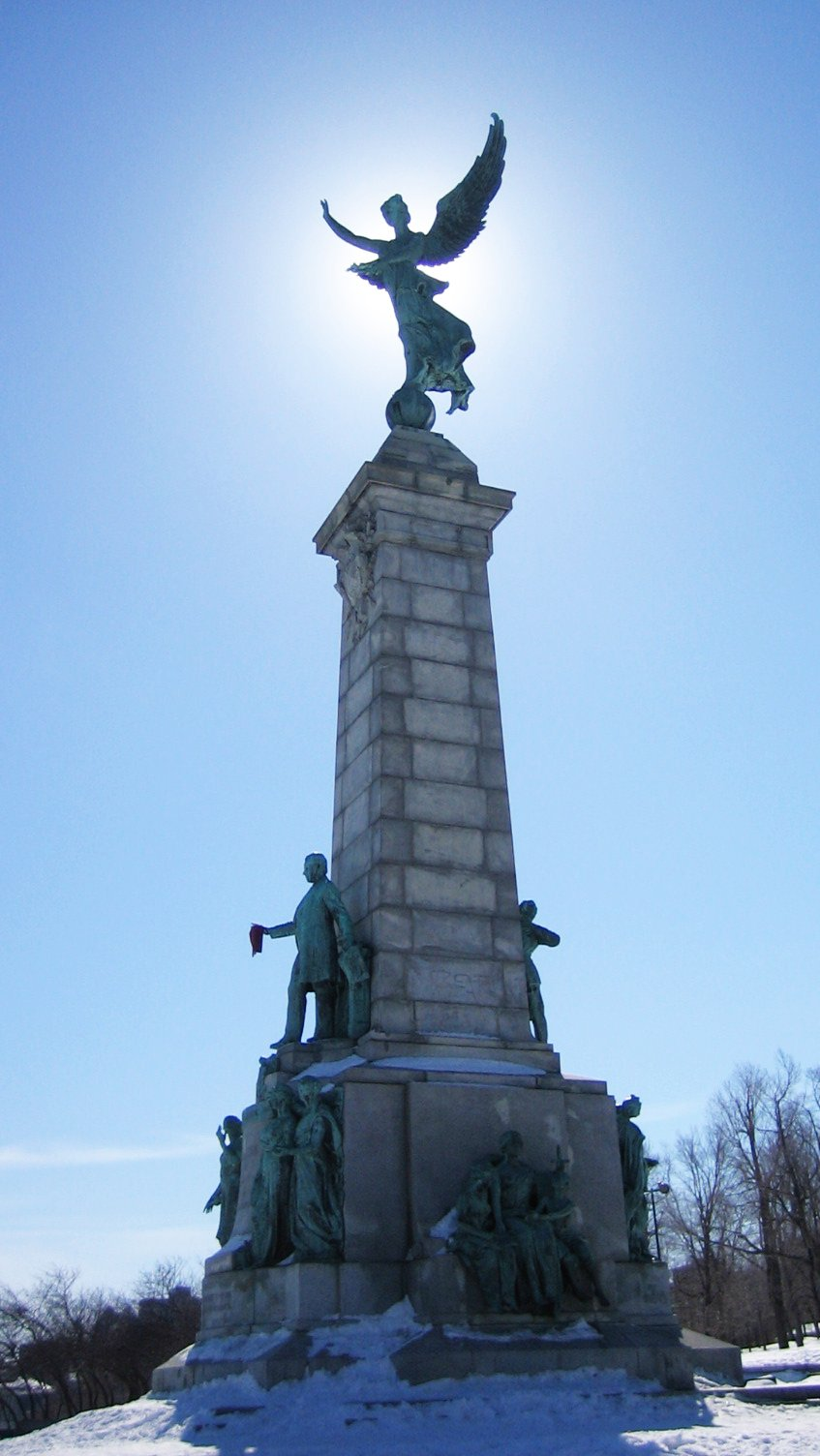
- Fame (La Renommée) backlit by the Sun
- Interactive map of Sir George-Étienne Cartier Monument
- Location: Mount Royal Park
- Coordinates: 45°30′51″N 73°35′07″W
- Designer: George William Hill
- Type: Historical Monument
- Material: Bronze, Stanstead granite
- Width: 8.75 metres (28.7 ft)
- Height: 30.78 metres (101.0 ft)
- Beginning date: 1913
- Completion date: 1919
- Opening date: September 6, 1919
- Dedicated to: George-Étienne Cartier

The Sir George-Étienne Cartier Monument (French: Monument George-Étienne Cartier) is a monument by sculptor George William Hill (1862–1934), with depiction of George-Étienne Cartier, located in Mount Royal Park in Montreal, Quebec, Canada.

The monument, which is topped by a winged Goddess of Fame (La Renommée), was inaugurated on September 6, 1919, in the heart of Fletcher's Field west side. In temperate months it is the site of free weekly drum circle festivals informally called Tam-Tams.

On the front, or East side of the monument, George-Étienne Cartier is portrayed standing above four other figures, each one representing a Province that signed the Canadian Confederation of 1867. On the North side of the monument, a woman with a young girl to her right and a young boy to her left is shown holding a sword in her left hand. The boy holds out his bonded wrists in a begging manner as the girl reads a book. This scene represents Legislation. On the South side, in a similar scene to the North side, a woman sits in the middle of a young boy who is holding a globe and a young girl who is reading a book. This represents Cartier's important contributions in education.

== Gallery ==
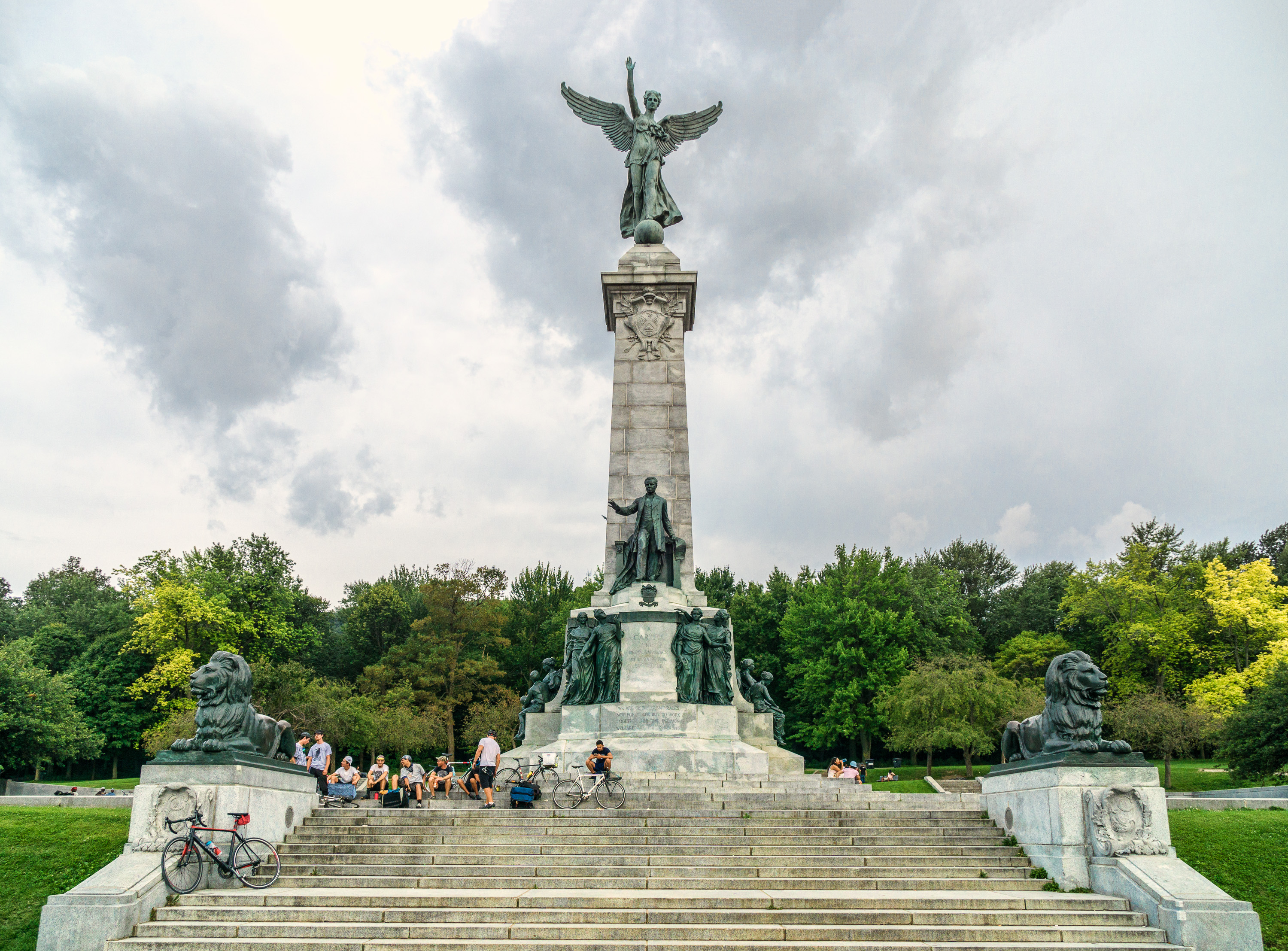
The George-Étienne Cartier Monument in Mount Royal Park, Montreal

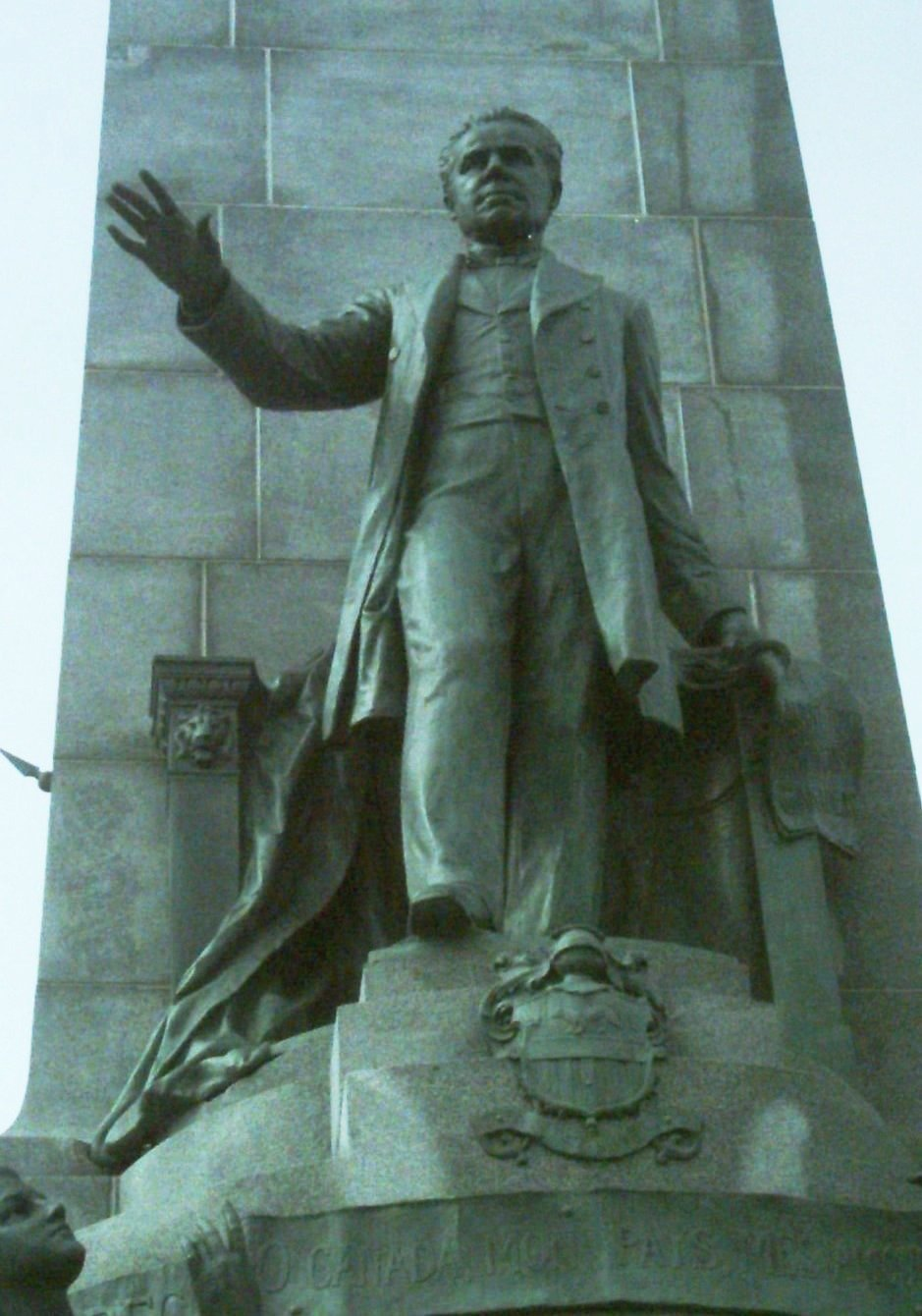
The George-Étienne Cartier statue on the monument
