= Dunn's =

Canadian Jewish deli chain

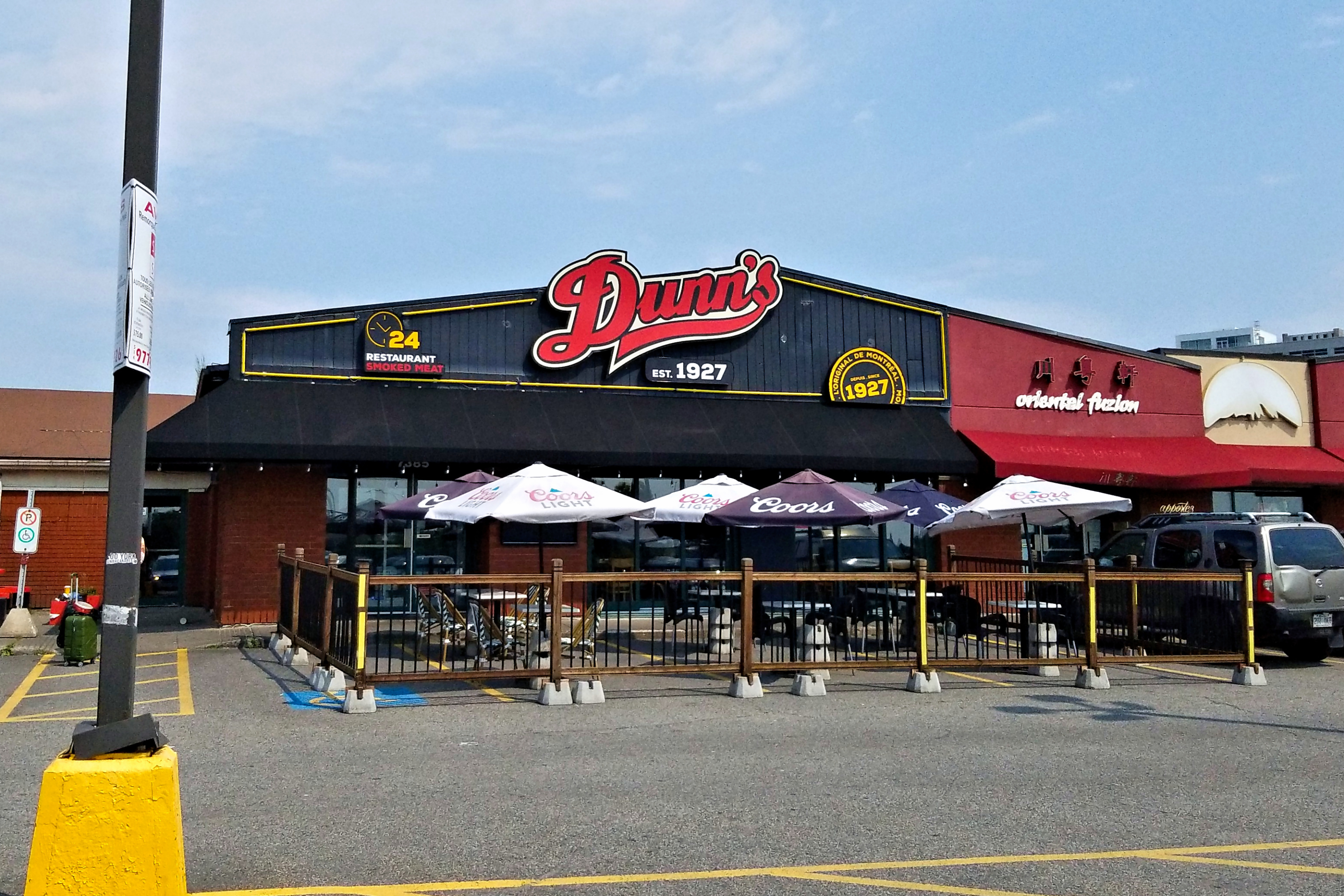
- Dunn's on Rue Jean-Talon, Montreal
- Type: Restaurant franchise
- Industry: Food service
- Founded: 1927; 99 years ago on Avenue Papineau near Avenue du Mont-Royal
- Founder: Myer Dunn
- Headquarters: 1249, rue Metcalfe; Montreal, Quebec; H3B 2V5
- Number of locations: 6 (2019)
- Area served: Quebec, Ontario
- Products: Food and drink (Montreal-style smoked meat, pastrami and cheesecake)
- Website: dunnsfamous.com

Dunn's Famous Deli and Steakhouse is a chain of Jewish delis serving Montreal-style smoked meat, pastrami and cheesecake founded in Montreal, Quebec, Canada, by Myer Dunn. The chain currently has five locations in and around Montreal.

== History ==
Dunn, who immigrated to Canada in 1911, opened his first restaurant in 1927 on Avenue Papineau near Avenue du Mont-Royal. In 1948 he opened his first restaurant to be called "Dunn's Famous Delicatessen" at the corner of Avenue du Parc and Avenue du Mont-Royal.

In 1955 he opened his flagship restaurant at 892 Saint Catherine Street West. The storefront windows were famous for the top-to-bottom stacks of large jars full of hot banana peppers. The deli was open 24 hours a day, unusual for restaurant in the downtown core. Beginning in the 1970s Dunn's Famous began to focus more on Montreal-style smoked meat, eventually stopping its promotion of Pastrami.

The iconic Saint Catherine Street deli closed in 1998, though Dunn's grandson re-opened the establishment in 2000 at a larger space nearby on Metcalfe Street. This move was controversial, as it turned off many loyal customers who preferred the nostalgia of the old location despite the overcrowding. Other longtime deli competitors, Schwartz's and Main Deli, quashed relocation and franchising plans due to the potential backlash of diluting their iconic brands.

=== Franchising ===
Ina Devine, daughter of Aideh Dunn, had franchised the restaurant outside Quebec, with several locations in Ontario and one in British Columbia, however, today, none remain open. The smoked meat is not prepared in-house at these locations, but it is instead shipped frozen from Montreal and then warmed out before serving.

Elliot Kligman currently has five franchises in Quebec and also offers Dunn's brand products to retail sellers.

=== Quebec language dispute ===
When the controversial Charter of the French Language (Bill 101) became law in 1977, the Office québécois de la langue française (OQLF) took action against Dunn's and other stores retailing imported kosher goods that did not meet its labelling requirements, an action perceived in the Jewish community as an unfair targeting and antisemitism. This coincided with a high-profile case brought by the OQLF against Dunn's due to the apostrophe in the establishment's sign, which remains.

Dunn's also got in trouble with the OQLF for having the English word, "Smoked Meat" on the sign out front. Dunn's, along with other well-known delicatessen establishments, also fought a ruling to change the name of "Smoked Meat" to "Boeuf Mariné" in order to conform to Quebec Language Law. They won the ruling by appeal by proving that if they didn't advertise "Smoked Meat" they would confuse and anger customers. A good example of this was Parti Québécois MNA Gérald Godin who himself ordered the sandwich by its English name. Due to the work of Myer Dunn, under the new ruling, enacted in 1987, Smoked meat became a word in both Official languages of Canada.

== See also ==
- List of Jewish delis
- List of Canadian restaurant chains
