= Montreal steak seasoning =

Spice blend

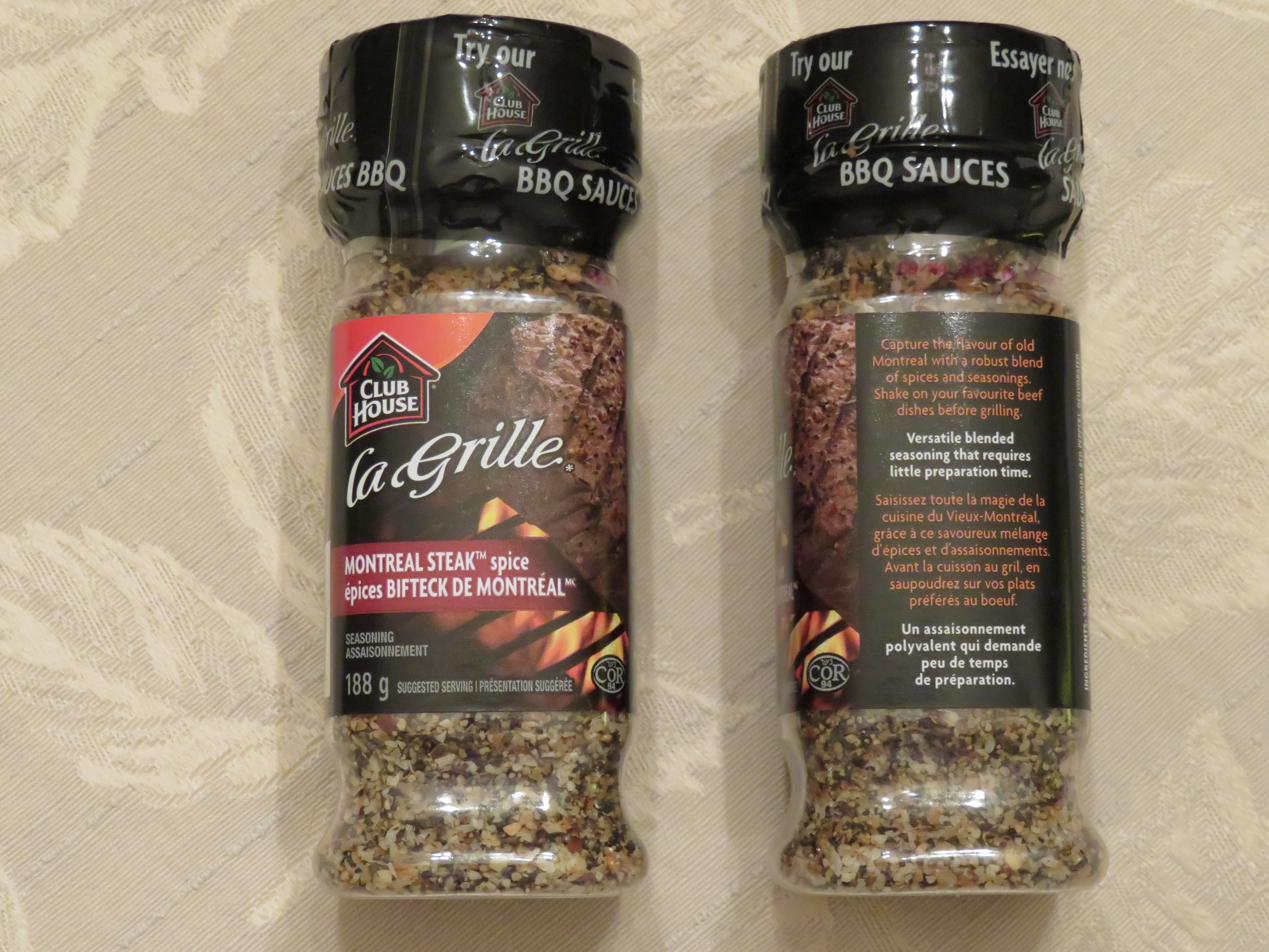
- Type: spice mix
- Place of origin: Montreal, Quebec
- Associated cuisine: Ashkenazi Jewish cuisine Cuisine of Quebec
- Created by: Morris "The Shadow" Sherman
- Invented: c. 1940s
- Main ingredients: garlic; coriander; black pepper; cayenne pepper flakes; dill seed; salt

Montreal steak seasoning, also known as Montreal steak spice, is a spice mix used to flavour steak and grilled meats. It is based on the dry-rub mix used in preparing Montreal smoked meat, which comes from the Romanian pastramă (the ancestor of pastrami), introduced to Montreal by Romanian Jewish immigrants.

The primary constituents of Montreal steak seasoning include garlic, coriander, black pepper, cayenne pepper flakes, dill seed, and salt. The spice mix recipe varies slightly among restaurants and manufacturers.

== History ==
The Montreal deli Schwartz's is credited with the creation of Montreal steak seasoning. It is rumoured that during the 1940s and 1950s, a Schwartz's broilerman by the name of Morris "The Shadow" Sherman began adding the deli's smoked meat pickling spices to his own rib and liver steaks. Soon the customers began asking for the same. Due to its popularity, it eventually became a norm in Montreal delis and steakhouses.

== See also ==
- Steak sauce
