= Main Deli Steak House =

Building in Quebec, Canada

Coordinates: 45.515925°N 73.577582°W

- Interactive map of Main Deli Steak House

Restaurant information
- Established: 1974
- Closed: 2023
- Food type: Kosher style delicatessen and Steakhouse
- Dress code: Casual
- Location: 3864 Saint Laurent Boulevard, Montreal, Quebec, H2W 1Y2, Canada
- Website: (archived: May 2018)

The Main Deli Steak House, also known simply as Main Deli or The Main, was a delicatessen and steakhouse located on Saint Laurent Boulevard in Montreal, Quebec, Canada.

== History ==
Main Deli was established in 1974 by Peter Varvaro Sr. Varvaro was Italian in background, but grew up immersed in the Jewish language and culture. The deli remained a family business, and two of Varvaro's children have opened their own deli restaurants in the suburbs of Montreal using their father's secret recipe for smoked meat, with Philip operating Delibee's, and Peter Jr. running Smoke Meat Pete which won the Montreal Gazette’s annual ‘Best Montreal Sandwich Award’ in 2001.

Main Deli was right across the street from their main business rival, the famed Schwartz's Montreal Hebrew Delicatessen. The two restaurants were often compared against each other in their patronage and the flavours of their Montreal-style smoked meat. While both establishments continued to be rated highly in recent years, Main Deli never won the ‘Best Montreal Sandwich Award’ which usually went to Schwartz's. Furthermore, Schwartz's was always much more popular among tourists who lined up there for hours while ignoring the Main Deli, attributed to Schwartz's "worldwide fame that makes it a must-enjoy attraction for tourists after 95 years in existence". Perhaps because of this, a frequent customer of Main Deli said “From what I heard, many Montrealers preferred it to Schwartz's. It felt like it had more of the real traditional feel, while Schwartz's can feel kind of touristy.”

Some of the regular clients of the Main Deli in the past included Stanley Lewis and Leonard Cohen, as well as Céline Dion, who had gone on to become their competition as one of the owners of Schwartz's.

The Varvaro family sold the restaurant in 2013 after Peter Sr. died. However under new ownership, the quality of the food began to decline while prices rose, as the meat wasn't smoked in-house anymore while the coleslaw was taken off the menu.

The Main Deli closed in May 2023, with its demise attributed to the COVID-19 pandemic in Montreal, unrelenting city construction on Saint Laurent Boulevard, and rising costs from recent food inflation.

== Offerings ==
The Main Deli's primary offering was Montreal smoked meat, which they cured and smoked in the back of their restaurant. Whole beef briskets were cured with brine and their own spice mix consisting of black pepper, garlic, coriander, mustard seed, and other ingredients found in Montreal steak seasonings. The meat was then smoked in a smoking oven and steamed to completion. Peter Varvaro Sr. indicated that while the spice mixture was important, it was the method of smoking and cooking the meat that contributed to its flavours and textures.

The restaurant was also well known for its smoked meat poutine, smoked meat burger, and coleslaw. Peter Sr. reportedly made everything by hand.

== See also ==
- List of delicatessens
