= Bens De Luxe Delicatessen & Restaurant =

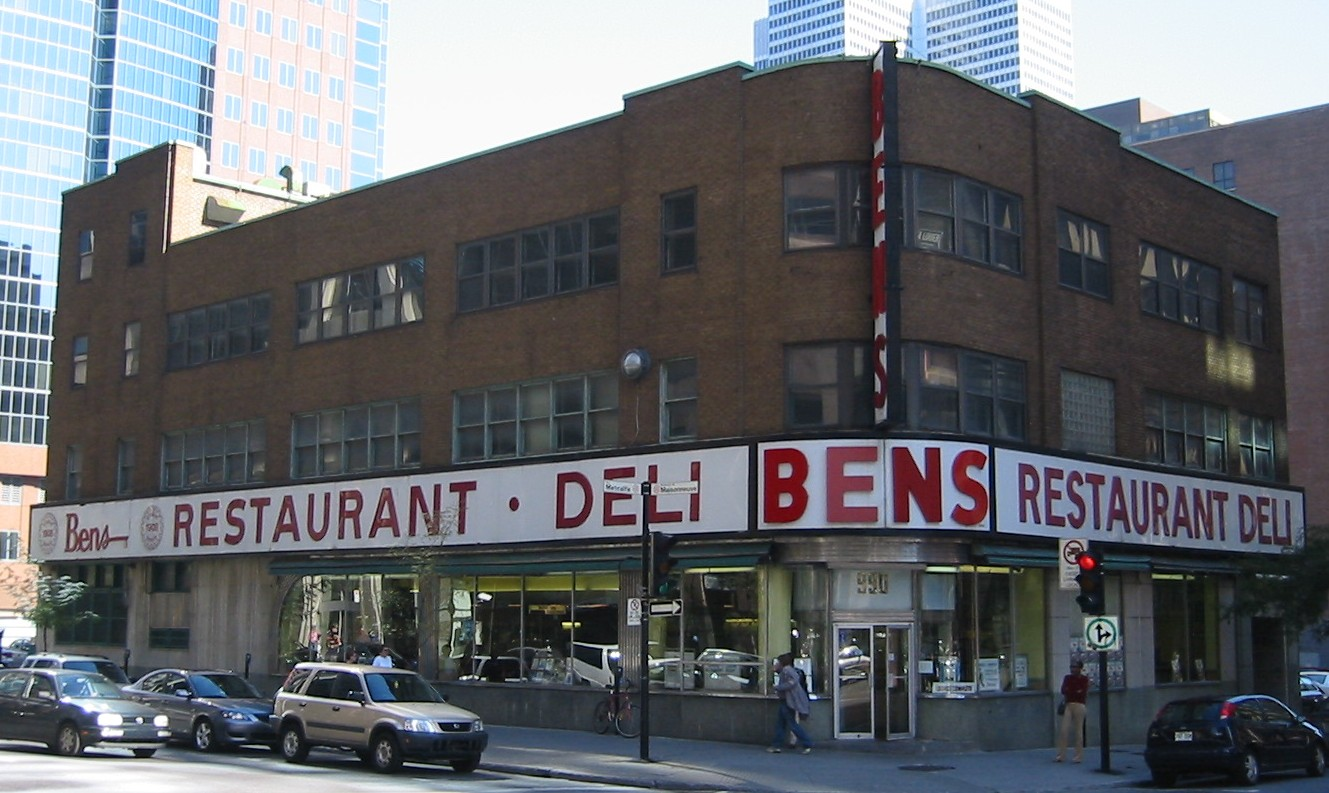
- Bens storefront (2005)

- Location within Montreal

Restaurant information
- Established: 1908
- Closed: 2006
- Food type: Jewish kosher style delicatessen
- Dress code: Casual
- Location: 990 De Maisonneuve Boulevard West, Montreal, Quebec, Canada
- Coordinates: 45.502091°N 73.573363°W

Bens De Luxe Delicatessen and Restaurant was a Jewish delicatessen in Montreal, Canada. The restaurant was famed for its Montreal-style smoked meat sandwich. During its heyday it was a popular late-night dining fixture in the downtown core and a favourite eatery of many celebrities. It was open for nearly a century, from 1908 to 2006. At 98 years it was the oldest deli in the city.

Bens had a longstanding and widely believed advertising slogan that claimed the restaurant had invented smoked meat, but this has been debunked by cultural historians.

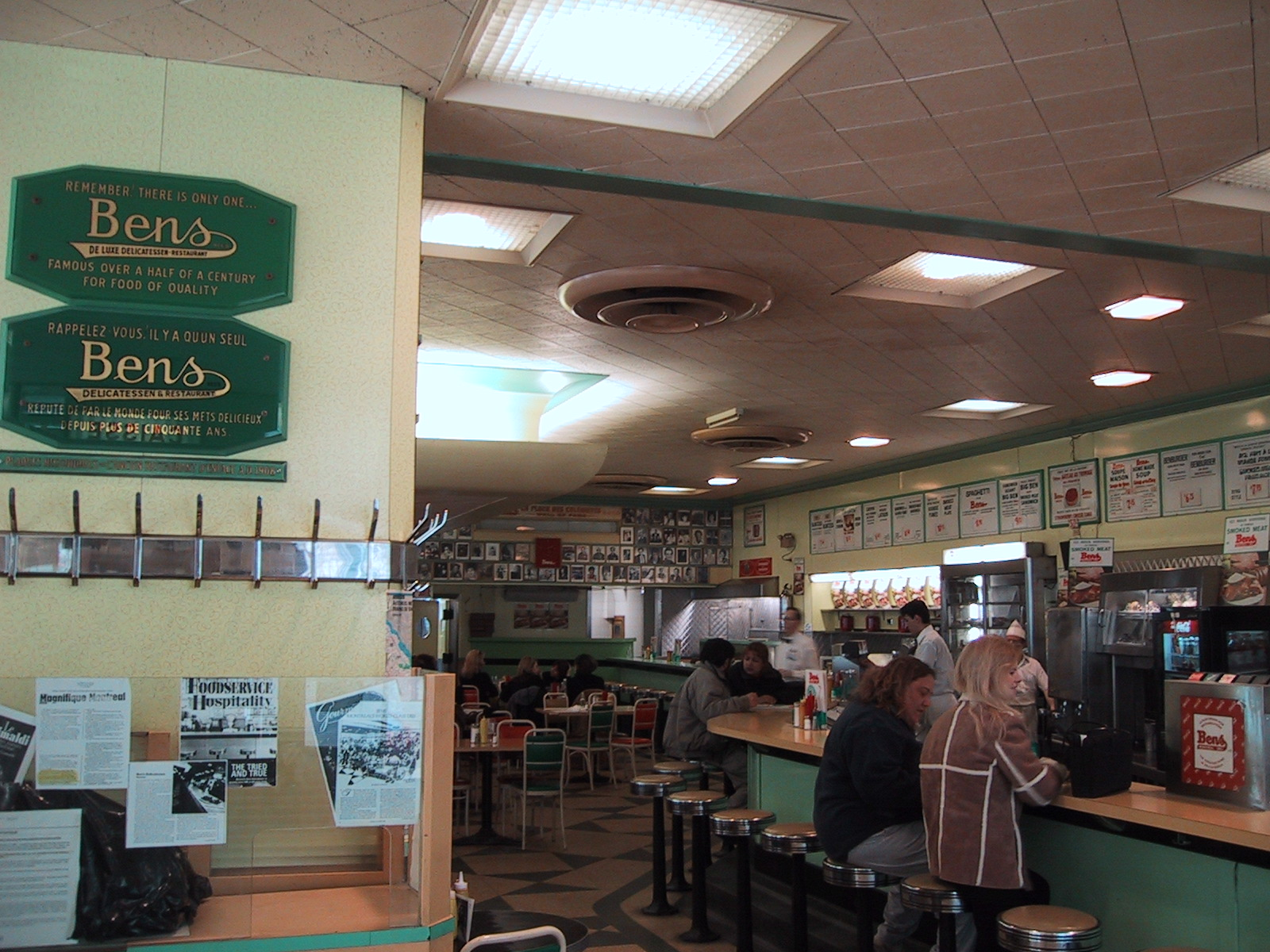
Inside beside the counter. Visible on the wall is a display of photos of celebrity customers

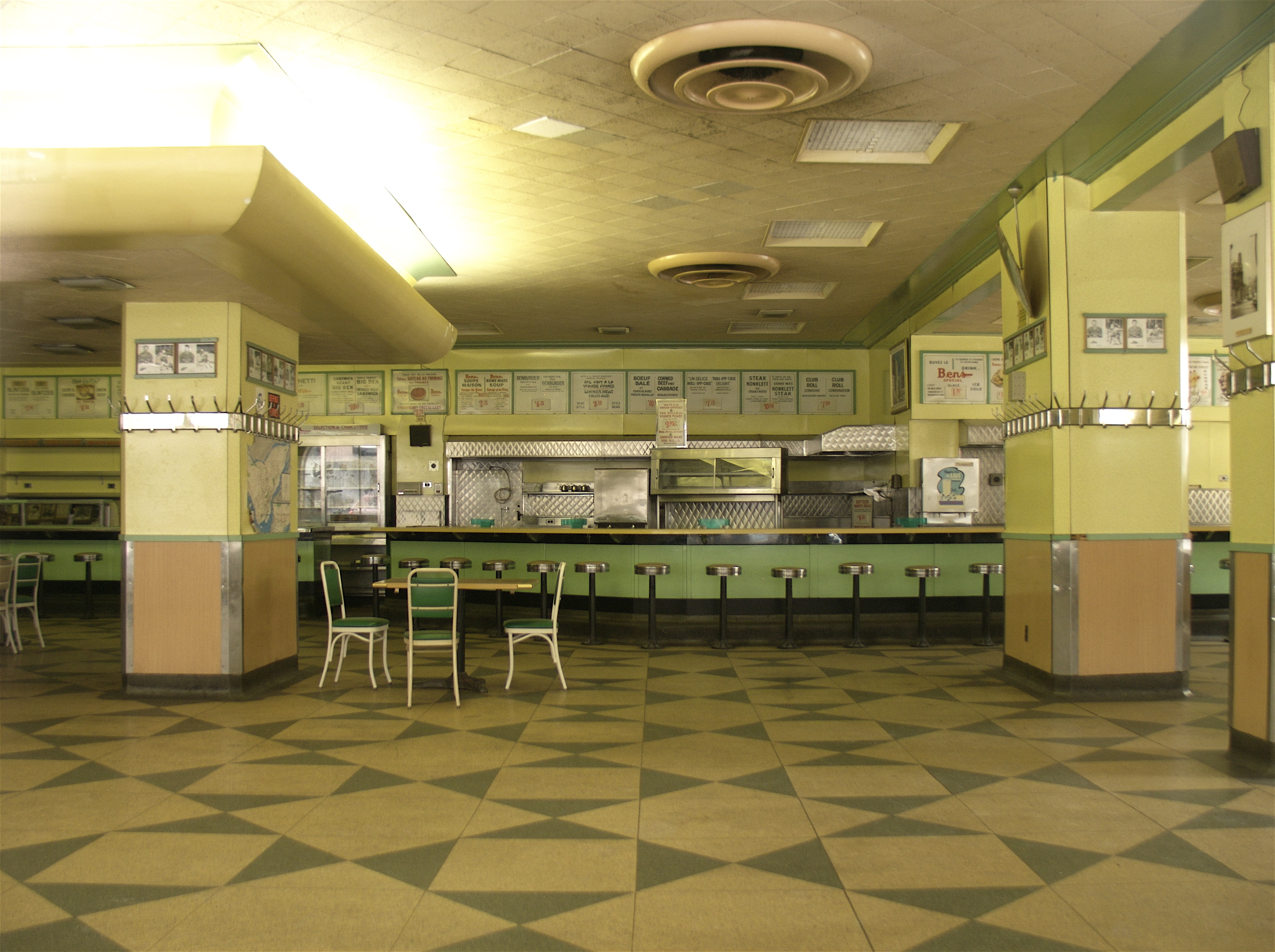
Inside view

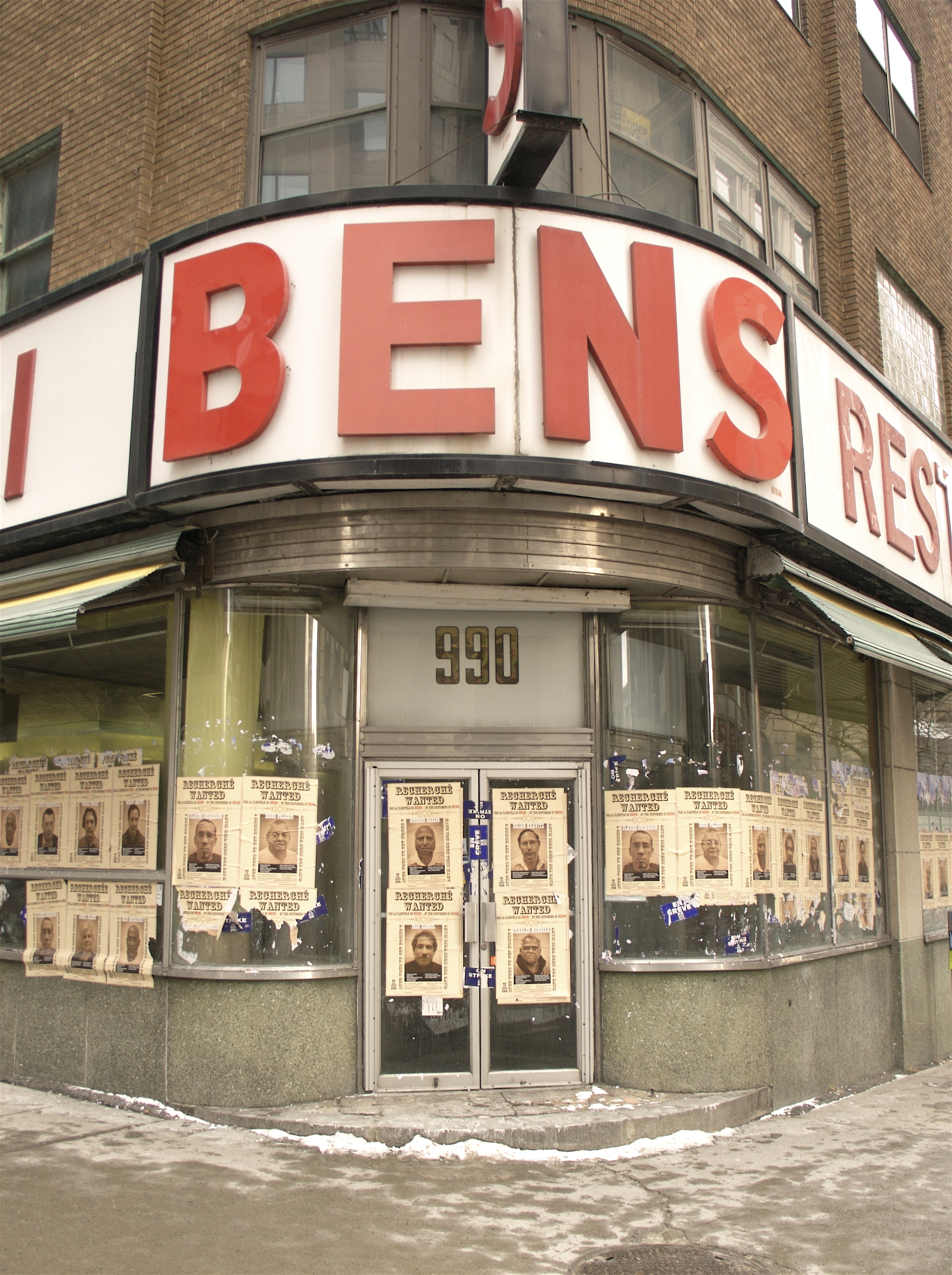
Bens' art deco-style entrance

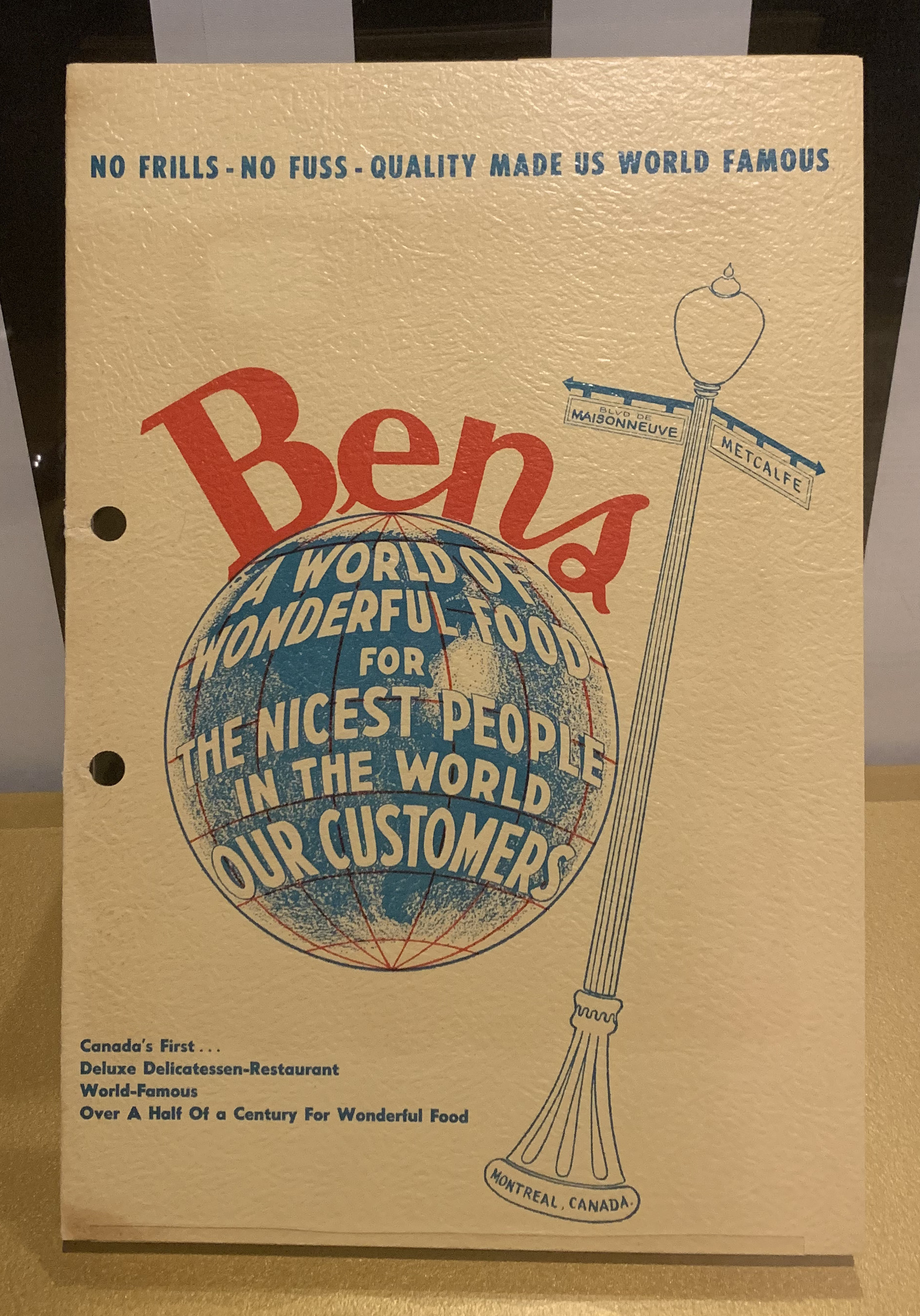
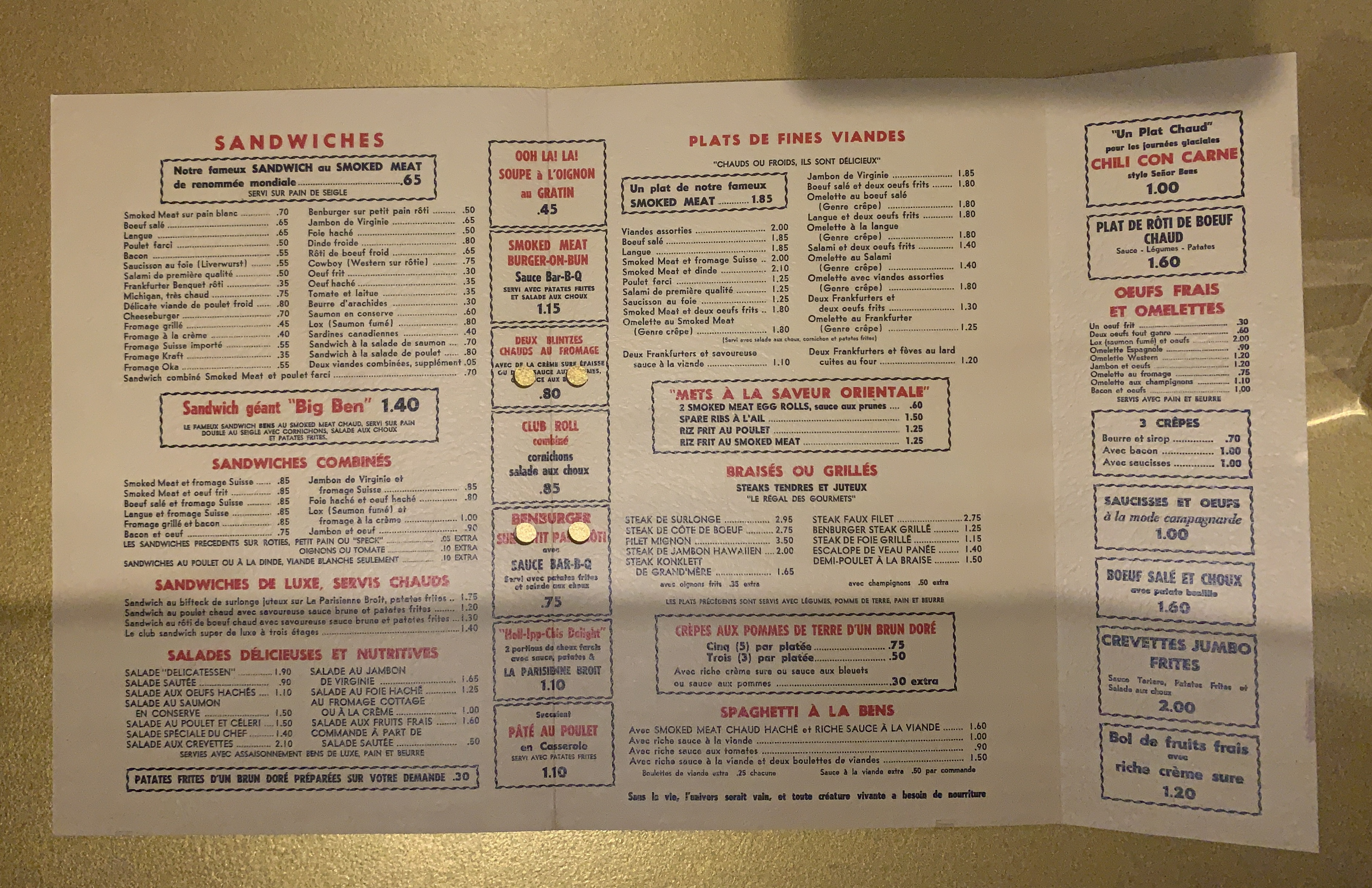
Bens' menu

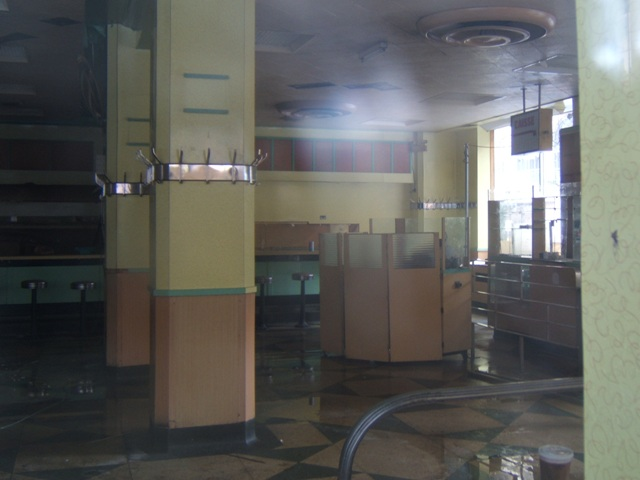
Cashier's counter

== Former restaurant site and interior ==
The restaurant was located at 990 De Maisonneuve Boulevard West, on the southeast corner of the intersection with Metcalfe Street. The three-storey brown brick building was designed in 1950 by Charles Davis Goodman, who as well designed the Jewish General Hospital and the Laurentian Hotel. It was Bens third and final location, where it operated from 1949 until its closure 57 years later. The building had a rounded front corner facing, green awnings, large bay windows and a large illuminated wrap-around sign. The restaurant was on the ground floor and two upper floors were rented.

The interior was seemingly unchanged through the years. Its columns and walls were painted in bright greens and yellows with chrome siding, it had a stainless steel edged counter with rows of chrome counter stools, and terrazzo floors, laminate wall covering, and a ceiling with indirect lighting coves. The chairs were bright yellow, orange and green. Walls were covered in photographs of celebrities who had dined at the restaurant; one spot was dubbed "Bens Wall of Fame". Bens employed only waiters, who wore a black bow tie and white buttoned shirt with black dress pants and shoes, along with a white waist apron.

== History ==
=== Early years and golden age ===
Benjamin Kravitz (a Lithuanian immigrant) and his Ukrainian-born wife Fanny (née Schwartz) opened a sweet shop on Saint Lawrence Boulevard in Montreal in 1908. They soon added smoked meat sandwiches, using his mother's recipe. Kravitz was generous towards customers and employees, as during the Great Depression he provided a breadline which he also personally served.

In 1929 they moved to de Maisonneuve (formerly Burnside) and Mansfield, and to their final location in 1949. The restaurant was open 23 hours daily, closed only for cleaning. The 1001 Burnside location, in the theatre district behind the Sheraton Mount Royal Hotel, was a popular late-night dining haunt for celebrities and movie stars.

Kravitz passed the business on to his sons Irving, Sollie and Al, who would often be seen working at the deli. At the height of its popularity, from the 1950s to the early 1980s, the restaurant had 75 to 100 employees. Customers often formed lunchtime line-ups that stretched around the block.

Many well known and famous people frequented the restaurant, including Canadian prime ministers Pierre Trudeau and Paul Martin, Quebec Premiers René Lévesque, Jacques Parizeau and Jean Charest, Free Trade negotiator Simon Reisman, artists Leonard Cohen and Irving Layton, entertainers Ed Sullivan, Burl Ives, Bette Midler, Jack Benny and Liberace, and sportsmen Bob Geary, Gordie Howe and Jean Béliveau (one of the many Montreal Canadiens that ate at the deli.)

Smoked meat fans debated whether Bens or Schwartz's (another local deli) had the best smoked meat sandwich. Bens thin sliced meat was piled high between rye bread, while Schwartz's offers plates of thickly cut smoked meat. Bens had a longstanding and widely believed advertising slogan that claimed the restaurant had invented smoked meat, but this has been debunked by Jewish food and cultural historians.

=== Decline ===
The 1990s were difficult for Bens, with the death of owner Irving Kravitz, followed by labour disputes (the employees unionized in 1995) and declining patronage. Irving died in 1992, leaving the restaurant to his wife Jean and their son Elliot, while Al was no longer involved in day-to-day operations. Business began to decline, the staff was reduced to 25, and the quality of the food and service was lesser than in previous years. The smoked meat was formerly prepared in-house, using big steamers, and then the meat was hand-cut. However, under cost-cutting by Jean Kravitz, the smoked meat was ordered from another company pre-cooked, then cut with a machine and warmed up by restaurant staff. French fries were formerly cut by hand and fried on the spot, but since then replaced by frozen fries. Also, the restaurant's opening hours were gradually reduced from 7:30 a.m. to 12:30 a.m., and until 2 a.m. on weekends to 7 a.m. to 3 p.m., a far cry from its heydays where the restaurant was open almost 24 hours (being closed only from 5 a.m. to 7 a.m. for cleaning).

Reviews criticized the quality of smoked meat and other signature dishes, as well as portion size and value for price. Though the restaurant got a poor reputation with locals who deserted it, it nonetheless survived due to its popularity with tourists who sought it out due to its history and the charm of its old-time decor.

=== Closure ===
The beginning of the end started on July 20, 2006, when employees voted to strike. It was the end of an era after 98 years of continuous operation, as the restaurant closed and would not reopen. On December 15, 2006, the building was sold to SIDEV Realty Corporation, bringing the restaurant's long history to an end. SIDEV immediately announced a new building project.

== Debate over preservation of site ==
SIDEV planned to build a 15-storey hotel on the property, but faced opposition. For nearly two years Bens sat empty, with its contents and memorabilia stacked inside. The building was one of the top 10 endangered places in Canada, according to the Heritage Canada Foundation. Described as a "cultural icon", an editorial in the Montreal Gazette disagreed, calling it a "cheap, miserable example of art deco," "soulless" and a "charmless collection of drab tan bricks." The Art Deco Society of Montreal wanted it preserved, as a tourist attraction and movie set as it had a Streamline Moderne motif. They wanted the city to stop the demolition and the building be declared a heritage site by the province.

=== Demolition and curation ===
On April 4, 2008, the city of Montreal stated it planned to allow demolition of the building and held a public hearing. On June 3 the Ville-Marie council unanimously voted to demolish the building, a condition being the developer must commemorate the deli in the new building. Demolition started September 25. On October 1, the iconic Bens wrap-around sign was removed and October 29 the vertical red Bens sign, that was visible for several blocks, was taken down. Demolition was complete in November. The deli memorabilia, including autographed photos from Bens Wall of Fame, menus and interior signage, were donated to the McCord Museum. The large red letters from above the main entrance are now on display in the Communication Studies and Journalism (CJ) building on the Loyola campus of Concordia University as part of the Montreal Signs Project. The MSP also holds much of the exterior signage, though this is not on display due to its fragility.

== Notable events ==
The National Film Board documentary Ladies and Gentlemen... Mr Leonard Cohen interviewed Leonard Cohen at Bens Deli in 1965 (seen at 32 minutes and 49 seconds into the film).

In a notable historic event, Bens Deli hosted the official unveiling of Canada's two-dollar coin: dubbed "the toonie", on February 19, 1996.

An exhibit about Bens was held at the McCord Museum in 2014. "Bens: The Legendary Deli" displayed some 100 artifacts, including menus, photos, dishes, and testimonials.

== See also ==
- List of Ashkenazi Jewish restaurants
- List of delicatessens
