= Stanley Lewis (sculptor) =

Canadian artist, sculptor and printmaker (1930–2006)

Stanley Lewis was a Jewish Canadian sculptor, photographer and an internationally renowned art teacher born on March 28, 1930, in Montreal. His works are held in many public collections such as the Montreal Museum of Fine Arts, the Musée national des beaux-arts du Québec, and the National Gallery of Canada, as well as in numerous private collections. Since the 1950, Lewis' sculptures and lithographic works have been displayed in the galleries and museums around the world in cities such as Paris, Florence, New York City, and Mexico City.

Lewis died on August 14, 2006, at the Montreal Jewish General Hospital due to a heart failure.

He is survived by his sister, Sheila Lewis Kanter, and his daughter, Alyssa (Reid) Savage.

== Training ==
Stanley Lewis received his formal training through the art school at the Montreal museum of fine arts by artists such as Arthur Lismer, a member of the Group of Seven, and Jacques de Tonnancour. Graduating first in his class, he continued in his studies at the l'Instituto Allende de San Miguel, in Mexico, at the workshop of the Master Florentine marble sculptor V. Gambacciani, and at the Ein Hod Artist's Colony in Israel. During his travels in Florence, Lewis met Irving Stone who was in turn significantly influenced by Lewis' work, stating "Lewis taught me how to make a chisel fly across marble, and why a sculptor, to be great, has to be a poet as well." In fact, Stone's interest in Lewis' sculpting and research work on the sculptor Michelangelo led to their collaboration on the novel The Agony and the Ecstasy, one of Stone's most well known works.

Lewis was a pioneer in colour lithography in Canada, using different lithographic stones for each transparent ink color to give a gradual transitional effect in the print. He was also interested in art of the Italian Renaissance and Inuit sculpture, spending several winters in the Canadian arctic to perfect his artistic skills.

== Professional life ==
Lewis was in charge of the Department of Sculpture at the Saidye Bronfman Centre School of the Fine Arts in Montreal. He also taught fine arts at the Museum of Quebec as well as McGill University. Starting in the 1960s, Stanley Lewis was a founding member of the Quebec Sculptors Association (l'Association des sculpteurs du Québec), renamed the Conseil de la Sculpture du Québec in 1978, which organized annual exhibitions or "Confrontations" to showcase area sculptors such as Mario Merola and Hannah Franklin.

Lewis is perhaps most broadly known for his work with Irving Stone during the latter's research for this novel, The Agony and the Ecstasy. In the late 1950s, he travelled with Stone to Italy, reproducing the sculptural tools and techniques Michelangelo used to help the novelist with his work of biographical fiction.

Even though he was an avid world traveller, Lewis always returned to Montreal to his studio above Berson Monuments, a gravestone carving company on Saint-Laurent Boulevard, which he said was "a constant reminder that we are mortal souls but our creations are timeless." The studio was considered an important hub and meeting place for artists and up until his death Lewis was an important figure and cornerstone to the Montreal art and Jewish community.

Lewis was also a regular customer of the Main Deli Steak House and Schwartz's, which are both located next to his studio.

After the 1989 massacre at the Montreal Polytechnic, Lewis donated one of his sculpture as a memorial to the victims.

After his death, two sculptors, including Quebec sculptor Eugène Jankowski, founded the Stanly-Lewis Academie in Montreal (l'Académie Stanley-Lewis à Montréal) in 2007.
