= Smoked meat =

Type of prepared meat

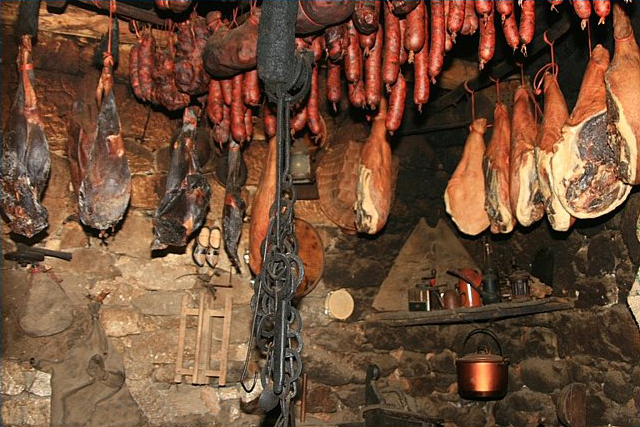
Smoked chorizo and jamón in Spain

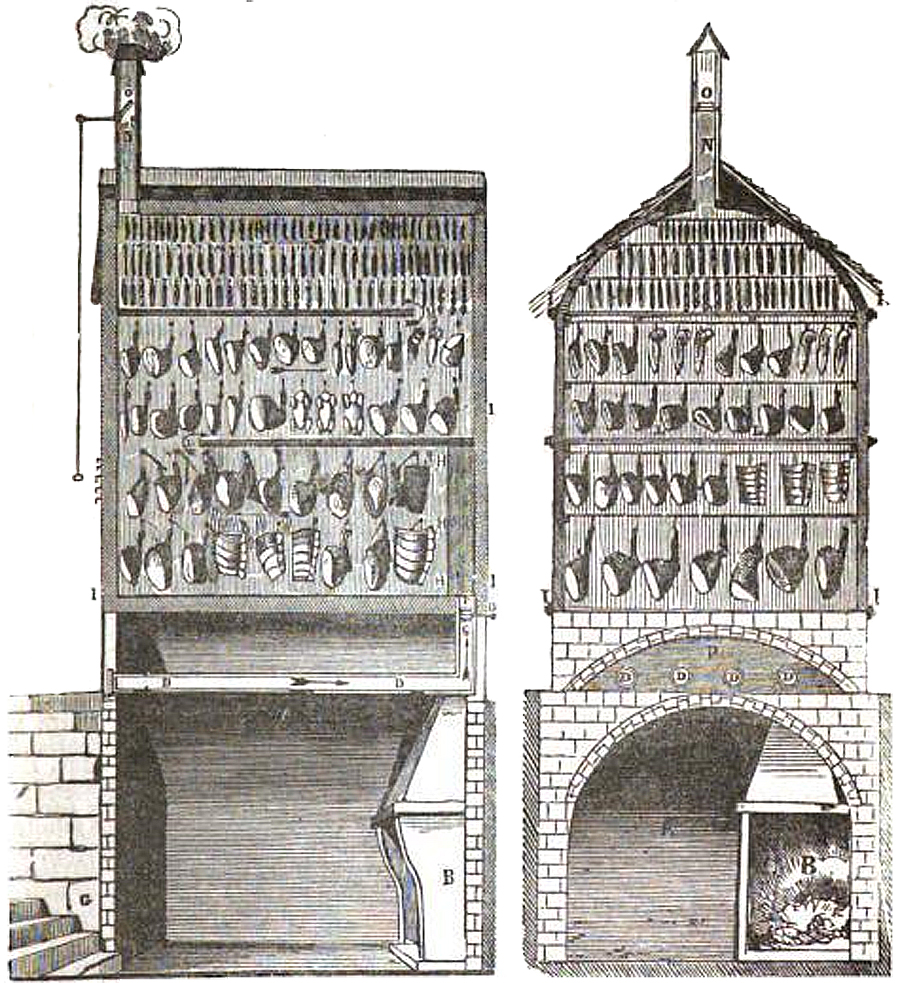
17th-century diagram for a smokehouse for producing smoked meat

Smoked meat is the result of a method of preparing red meat, white meat, and seafood which originated in the Paleolithic Era. Smoking adds flavor, improves the appearance of meat through the Maillard reaction, and when combined with curing it preserves the meat. When meat is cured then cold-smoked, the smoke adds phenols and other chemicals that have an antimicrobial effect on the meat. Hot smoking has less impact on preservation and is primarily used for taste and to slow-cook the meat. Interest in barbecue and smoking is on the rise worldwide.

== Smoking with wood ==
Generally meat is smoked using hardwood or wood pellets made from hardwood; softwood is not recommended due to the resin producing a larger quantity of PAHs. Wood smoke adds flavor, aroma, and helps with preservation. There are two types of smoking: cold smoking generally occurs below 90 °F (32 °C) and has more preservative value. Hot smoking generally occurs above 160 °F (71 °C). Most woods are seasoned and not used green. There are many types of wood used for smoking; a partial list includes:

- Woods with a mild flavor: Alder, apple, apricot, ash, birch, cherry, maple, peach, pear.
- Woods with a medium flavor: Almond, hickory, pecan, post oak, pasania.
- Woods with a strong flavor: Acacia, black walnut, chokecherry, grapevine, mesquite.
- Other woods and organic matter: Avocado, bay, beech, butternut, carrotwood, camphor, castanopsis, chestnut, citrus woods, cottonwood, crabapple, fig, guava, gum, hackberry, kiawe, lilac, madrone, mulberry, olive, peat, plum, persimmon, pimento, tea, and willow.

== Types ==
=== African fish smoking ===
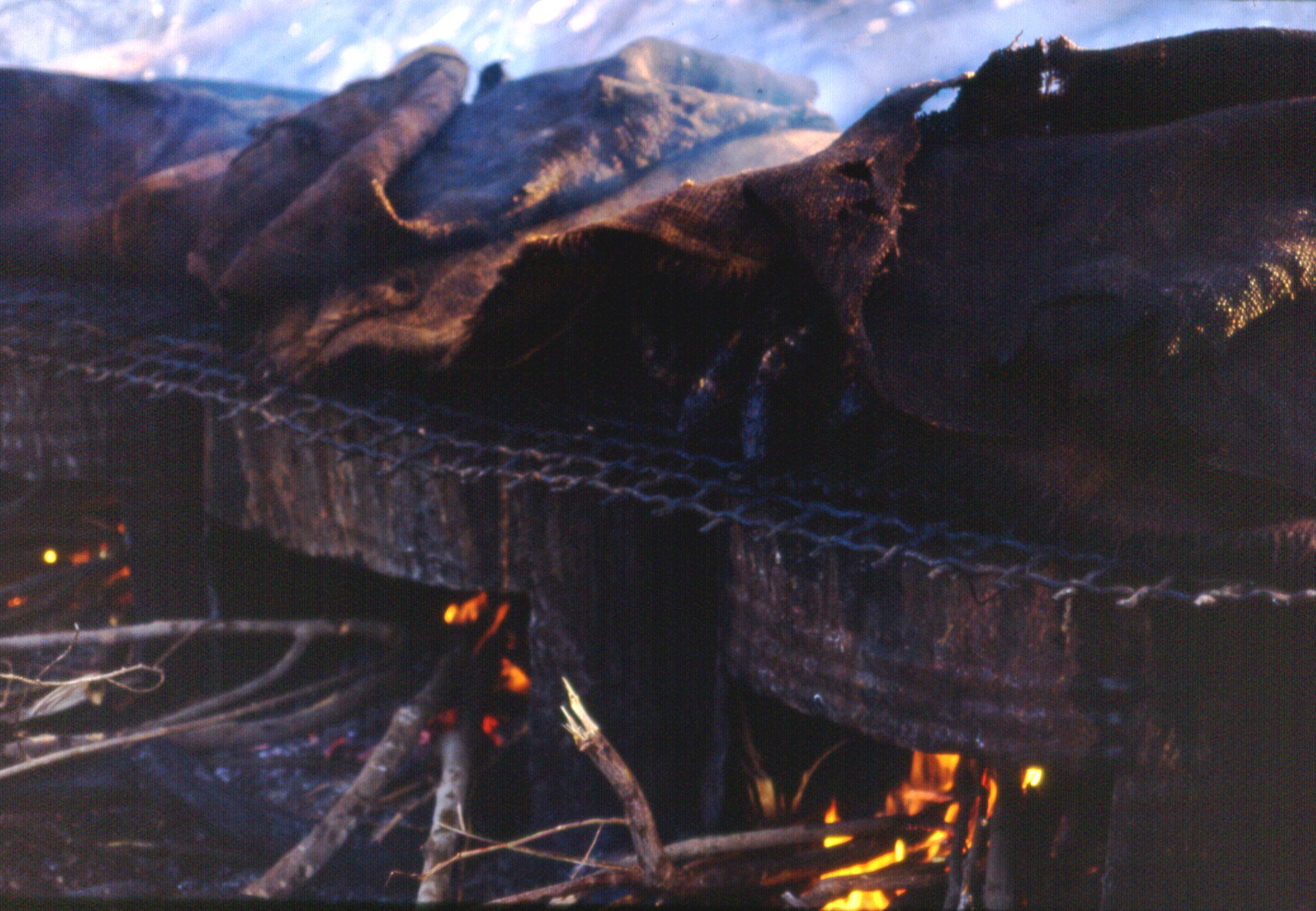
Smoking fish near Dakar, Sénégal

Close to 80% of all fish caught in most African nations is smoked. Traditionally the processing and smoking of fish has been done by women. The primary method of smoking is hot smoking, the flavor from hot smoking preferred by local consumers. Traditional smoking methods include using bamboo racks over smoky fires, mud ovens and placing the fish directly on smoldering woods and grasses. Modern methods of smoking include using re-purposed oil drums, brick ovens, and Chorkor ovens.

=== American barbecue (smoked) ===
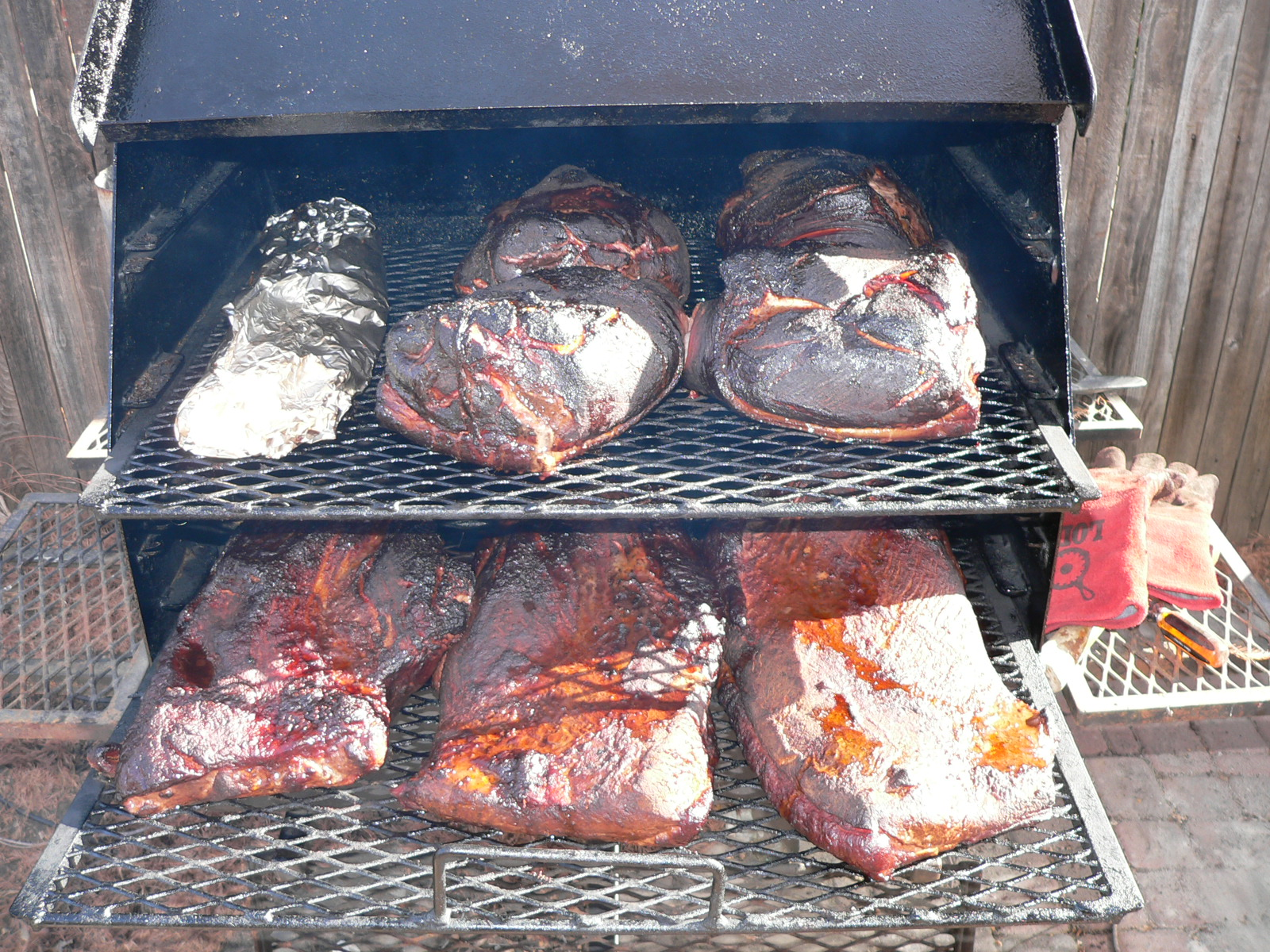
American barbecue

American barbecue's roots start with the Native Americans who smoked fish and game to preserve food for leaner times. When Europeans first came to North America, they brought with them smoking techniques from Europe and Central Asia and combined those with the Native American techniques. American barbecue has distinct regional differences: North Carolina Piedmont style is pork shoulder with a vinegar & ketchup-based sauce; Eastern style is the whole hog with vinegar & pepper-based sauce; South Carolina is whole hog or shoulder with a mustard-based sauce; Western Tennessee and Memphis are famous for its dry rub ribs, but wet is also available; Kentucky is known for their mutton, pork shoulder and whole hog are also very popular; Kansas City barbecue is more about the sauce, often used with smoked pork, lamb, chicken, beef and turkey. Beef ribs, smoked sausage, brisket are the prevalent meats in Texas.

=== Bacon ===
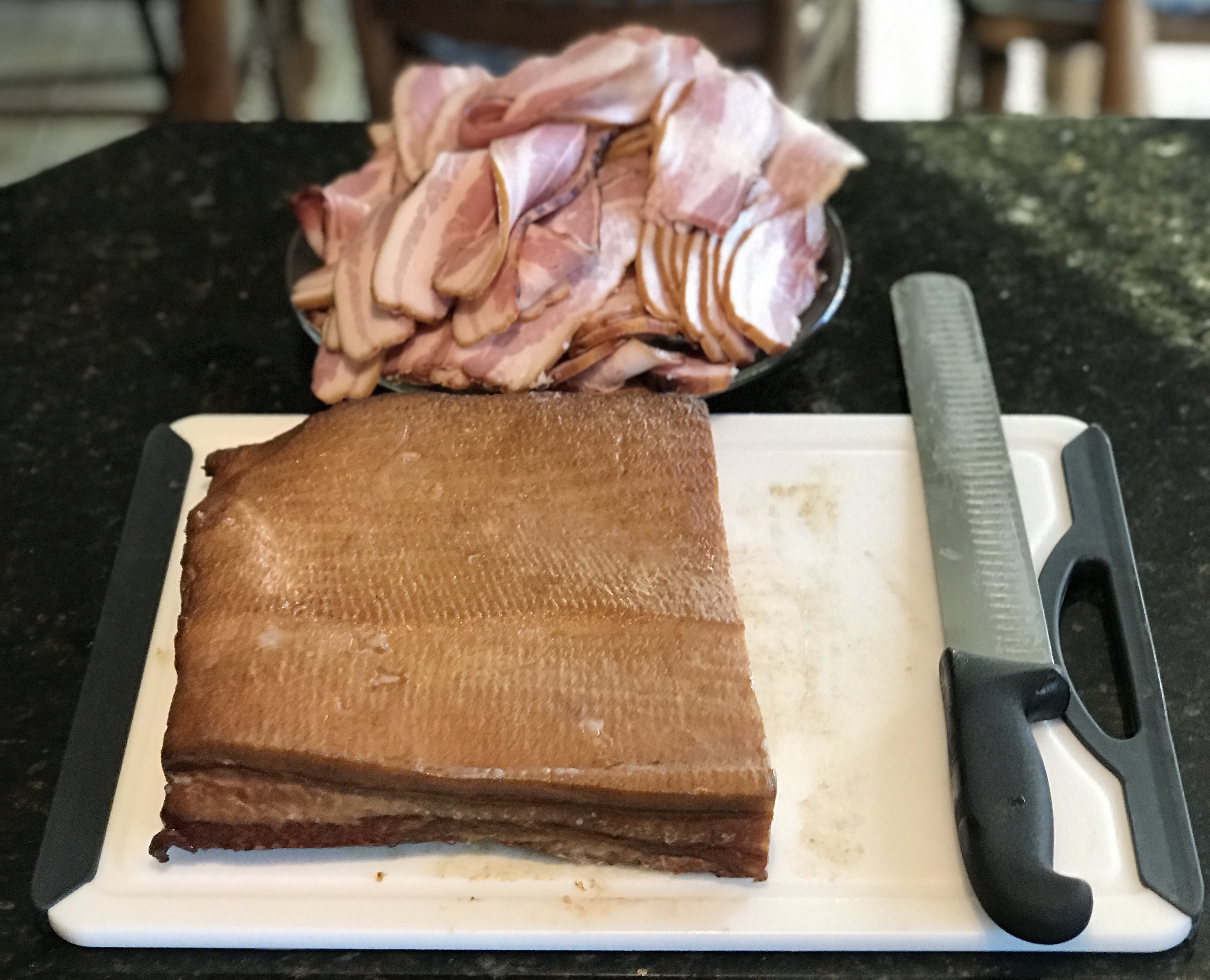
American "streaky" bacon

Bacon originated with petaso, a Roman version of what is now called bacon. The etymology of the word bacon has four possibilities; the Franceis word bacon, the Althochdeutsch word bahho, the Old Low Franconian word baken, and the Common Germanic word bakkon. John Harris of Calne, England, was the first to commercialize production of bacon in the 1770s. Bacon is primarily pork, depending on the type; it can come from the belly, back, loin or side. The preparation of bacon varies by type, but most involve curing and smoking. Some of the types of bacon include American (a.k.a. side bacon or streaky bacon), buckboard (shoulder bacon), Canadian (back bacon), British and Irish (rasher), Australian (middle bacon), Italian (pancetta), Hungarian (szalonna), German (speck), Japanese (beikon), and Slovakian (oravská). Bacon can also be produced from beef, lamb, and wild game.

=== Country ham ===
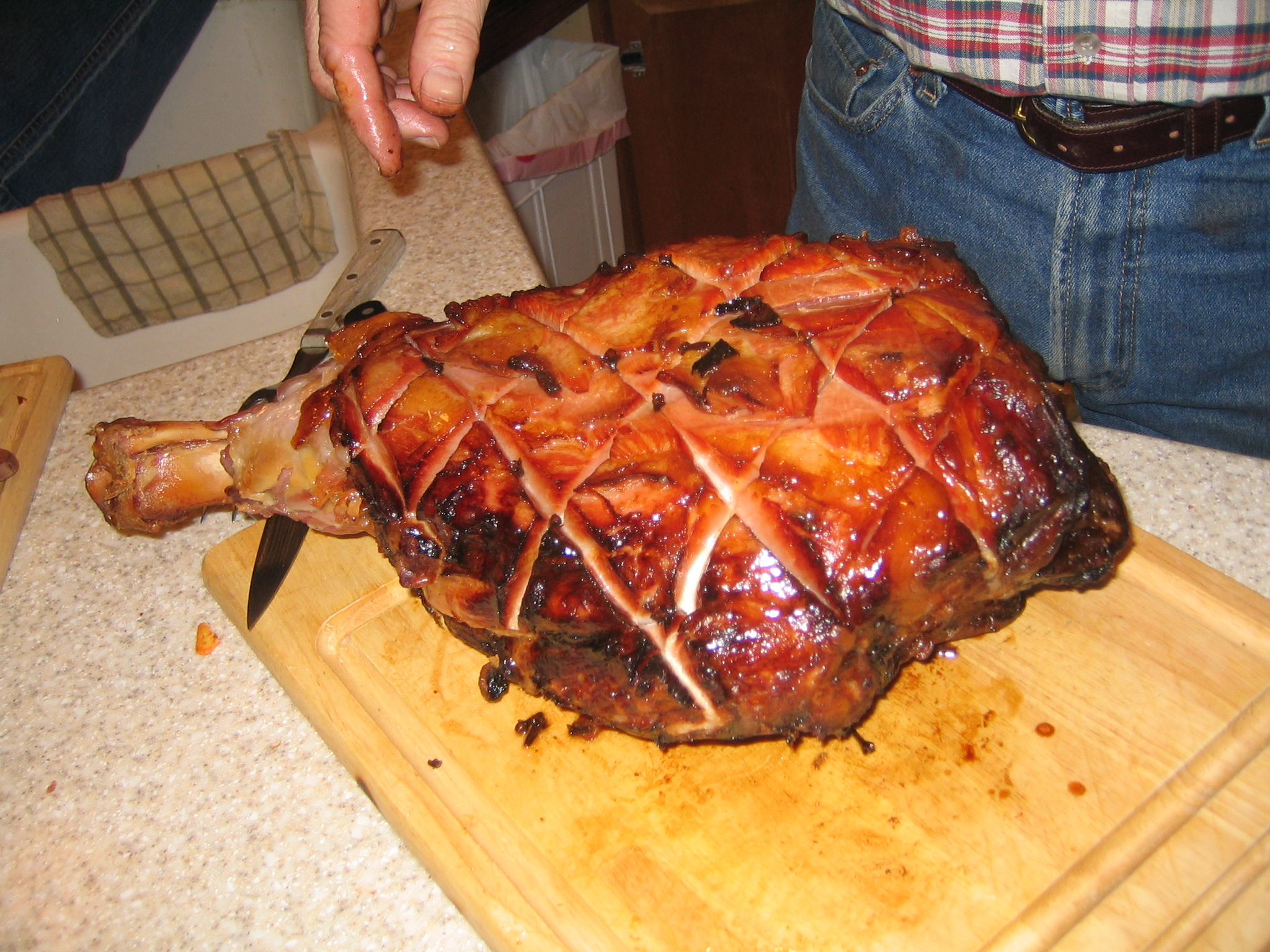
Country ham

Country ham is a popular ham originally developed by American Colonists who took traditional Native American fish smoking practices and used them for pork. Country hams traditionally were made in the American Southeast from Virginia to Missouri. Most country hams are trimmed, wrapped, cured in salt, sugar, pepper and various spices. In modern times, some preparations add nitrates for food safety. After curing the hams are smoked for at least 12 hours, then hung to dry for 9 to 12 months. Some traditional processes can take years from curing to being ready to consume.

=== Finnan haddie ===
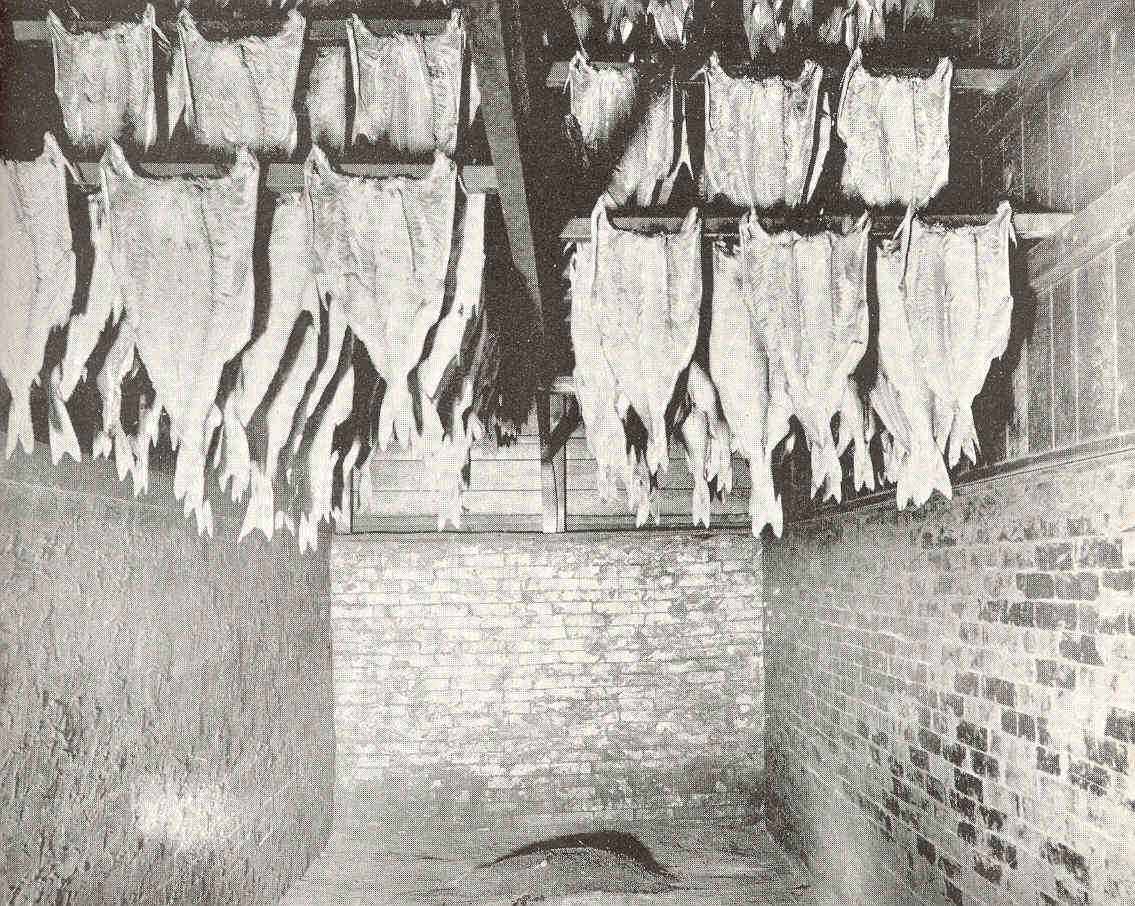
Smoking Finnan haddie

Finnan haddie is a cold smoked haddock that originated in medieval times in the Scottish village of Findon. Traditionally the haddock is smoked with green wood and peat. Smoked finnan haddie is the colour of straw, newer commercial methods of drying without smoke produce a gold or yellow colour. Until the 1800s when regular rail service was established, finnan haddie remained a local dish, now it can be found in markets worldwide.

=== Katsuobushi ===
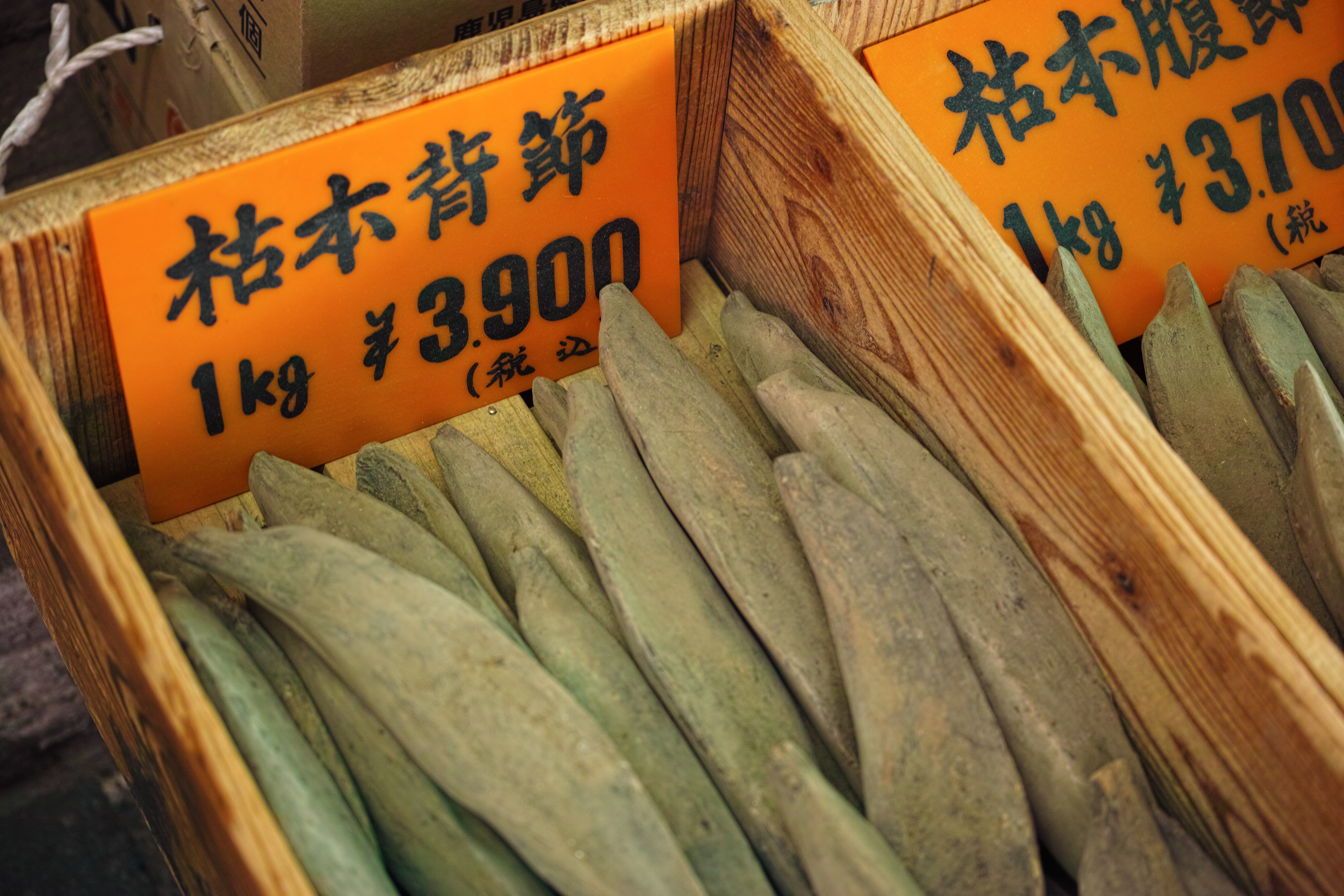
Katsuobushi

Katsuobushi is a key umami ingredient in Japanese cuisine, with bonito flakes among its many applications. Katsuobushi is made from skipjack tuna that is washed, quartered smoked with oak, pasania, or castanopsis wood, and cooled repeatedly for a month. Some producers will spray the fish with Aspergillus glaucus to promote further drying. After one to 24 months the fish will be katsu (hard) and ready for use. To make bonito flakes it is shaved very thinly using a Katsuobushi grater box.

=== Montreal-style smoked meat ===
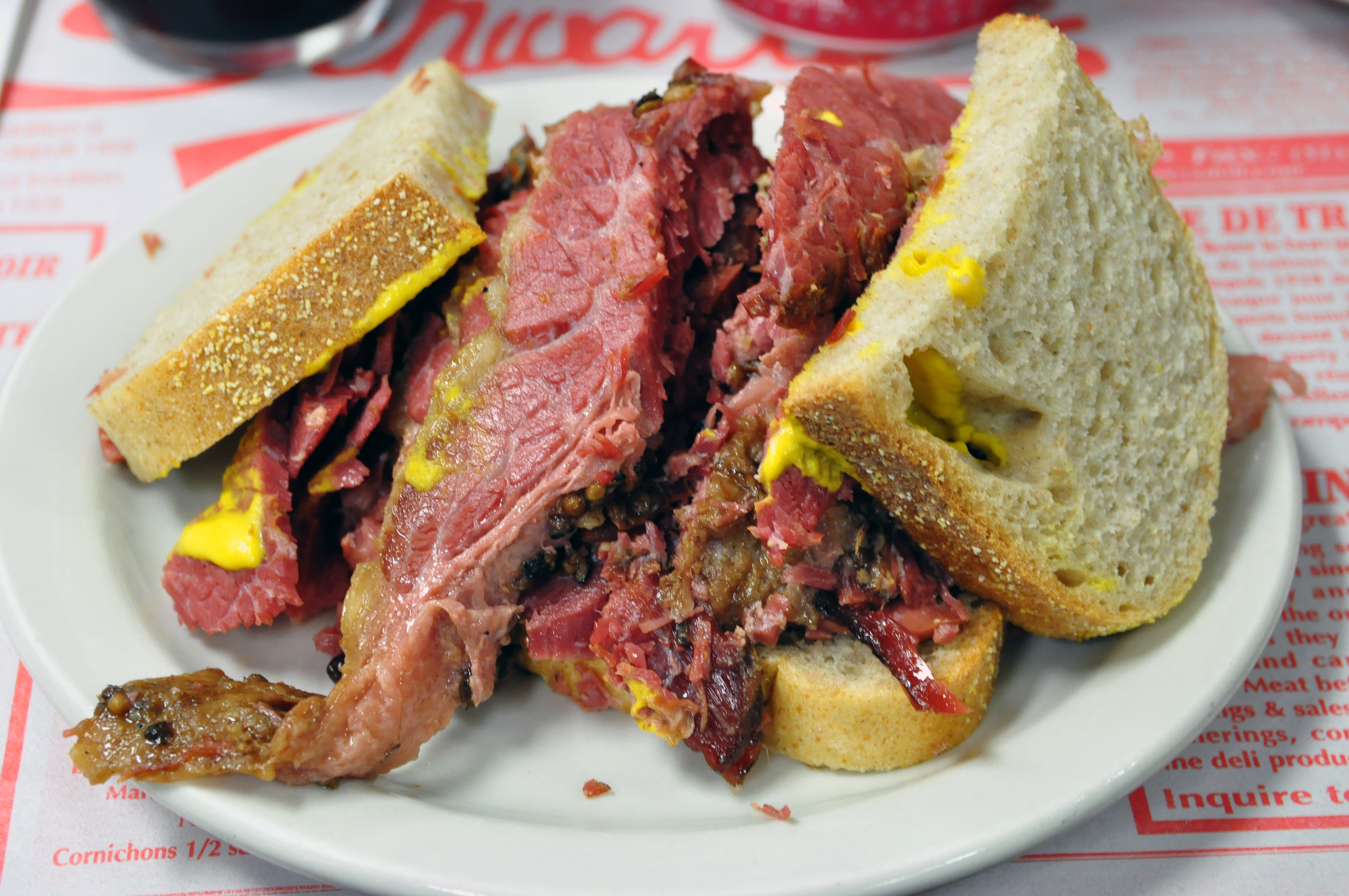
Montreal smoked meat sandwich from Schwartz's.

A type of kosher-style deli meat product made by salting and curing beef brisket with spices. The brisket is allowed to absorb the flavours over a week, is then hot smoked to cook through, and finally is steamed to completion. The preparation method may be similar to New York pastrami, but Montreal smoked meat is cured in seasoning with more cracked peppercorns and savoury flavourings, such as coriander, garlic, and mustard seeds, and significantly less sugar.

=== Pastrami ===
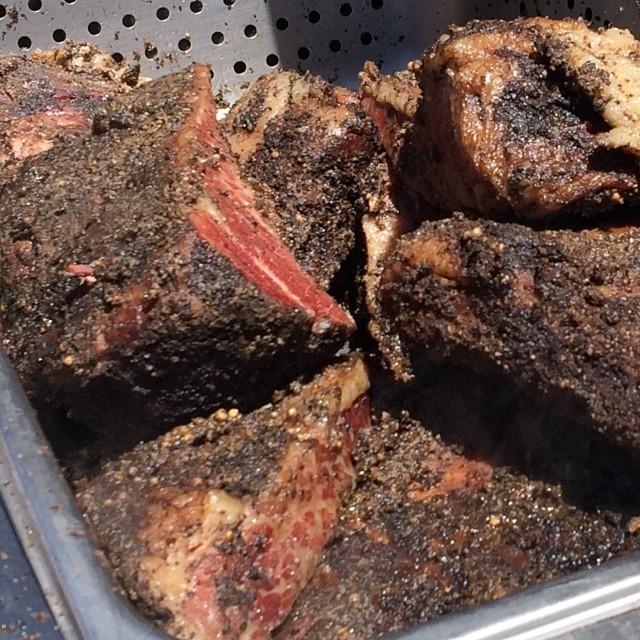
Pastrami

Pastrami is most often made with beef brisket; it can be made with other cuts of beef. The meat is cured in a brine (most often dry), after drying, it is coated in spices and smoked. Smoking can be done by either cold smoking or hot smoking. Pastrami evolved from the Turkish Huns who would tenderize and dry meat under their saddles. Armenians saw what the Huns had done and created basturma that was spiced and air-dried meat. Romanians first started brining, spicing, and smoking the beef and created what is now called pastrami. When Romanian Jews immigrated to the United States, Canada, and Great Britain in the late 1800s, they carried that tradition of pastrami with them. The Romanians that immigrated to the United States, mostly settled in New York City area and developed the classic New York Pastrami. Those that immigrated to Canada mostly settled in Montreal used a different brining technique and spices and called it smoked meat. Pastrami is still produced in Southwest Asia and the Middle East and is called Pastirma, basterma or basturma. While customarily made with beef, in other regions it can be made with lamb, goat, buffalo, and camel. Corned or salt beef uses a similar brine and spices, but is not smoked.

=== Zhangcha duck ===
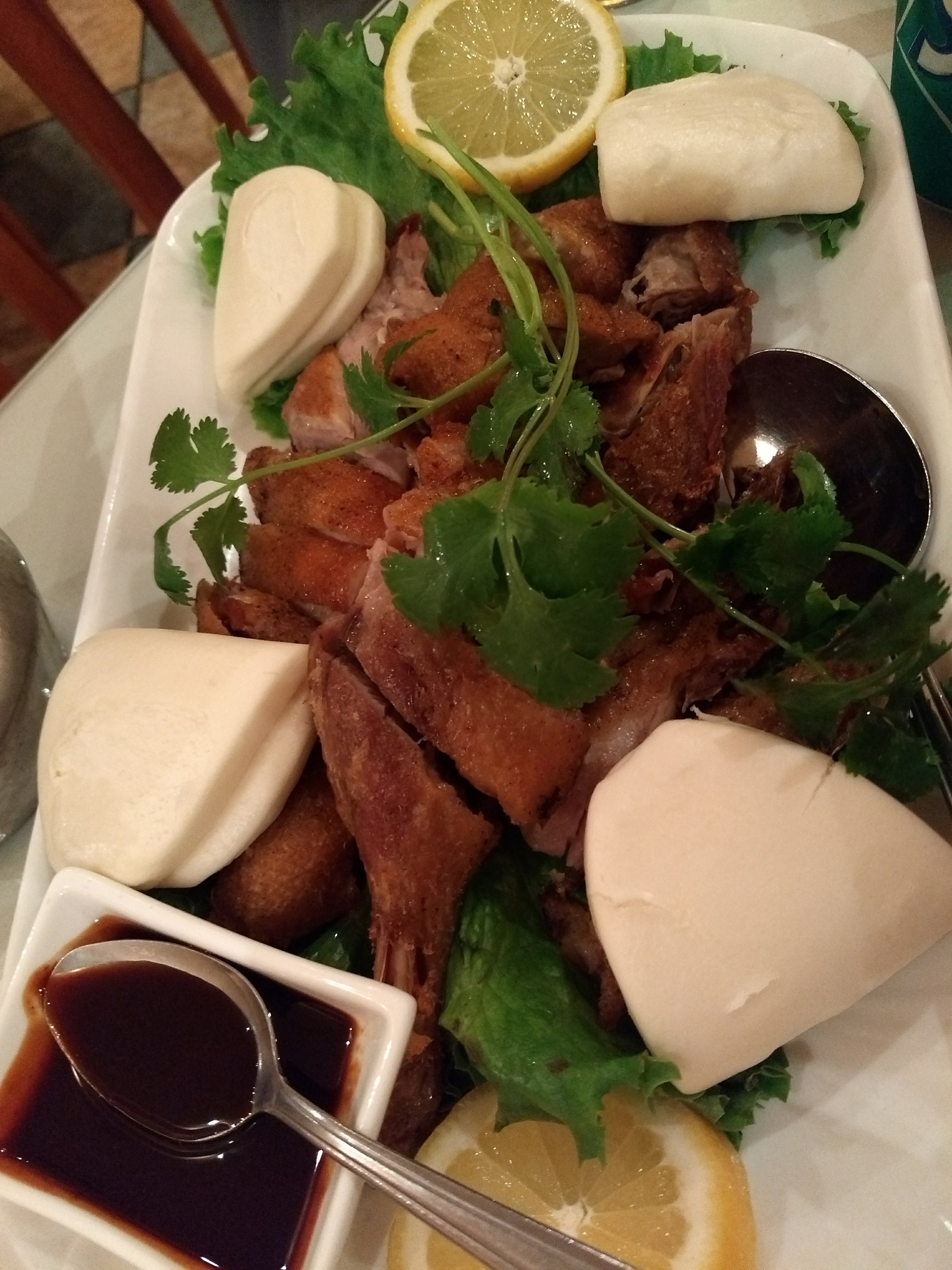
Zhangcha duck

Zhangcha duck is a dish from Sichuan Province in southwestern China made from the Chengdu Ma duck. The duck is marinated in a pickling liquid then smoked with camphor and tea leaves. After smoking, the duck is deep fried, boned and served over rice.

== Health concerns ==
In 2015, the International Agency for Research on Cancer (IARC) has declared processed meat, including smoked meat, to be a Group 1 carcinogen based on substantive evidence, as its consumption demonstrably causes colorectal cancer in humans. This occurs primarily through the formation of N-nitroso compounds, specifically nitrosamines, during digestion.

The use of softwoods is discouraged, as the resin in softwood increases the concentration of polycyclic aromatic hydrocarbons (PAHs) that are known carcinogens, further increasing the probability of carcinogenesis.

== See also ==
- African longfin eel
- Atlantic mackerel
- Beef jerky
- Black Forest ham
- Brési
- Cod
- Cecina
- Charcuterie
- Deli meat
- Gammon
- Herring
- List of smoked foods
- Salmon
- Suho meso
