= Montreal-style smoked meat =

Smoked style of corned beef created by Jewish immigrants in Montreal, Quebec

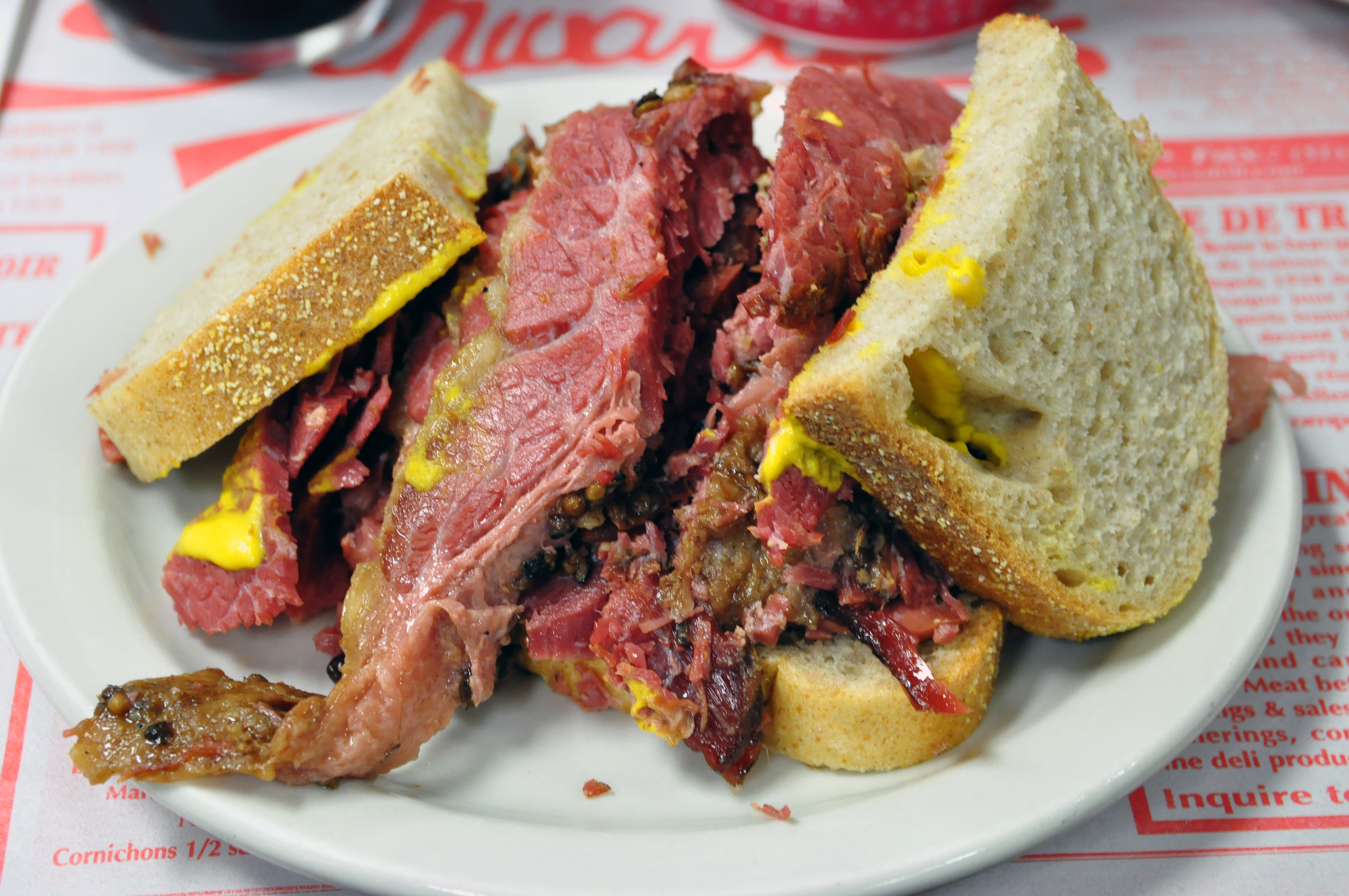
- Montreal-style smoked meat from Schwartz's in Montreal
- Course: Main course
- Place of origin: Canada
- Region or state: Montreal, Quebec
- Created by: Disputed; various Jewish delicatessens in the city
- Main ingredients: Smoked meat, mustard, and rye bread

Montreal-style smoked meat, Montreal smoked meat, or (mainly in Quebec) simply smoked meat (French: viande fumée, lit. 'smoked meat', or sometimes bœuf mariné, 'marinated beef') is a type of kosher-style delicatessen meat product made by salting and curing beef brisket with spices. The brisket is allowed to absorb the flavours over a week. It is then hot smoked to cook through, and finally is steamed to completion. This is a variation on corned beef and is similar to pastrami.

== Preparation ==
Although the preparation method is similar to that of New York pastrami, Montreal smoked meat is cured in seasoning with more cracked peppercorns and similar savoury flavourings, such as coriander, garlic, and mustard seed. The recipe for Montreal steak seasoning is based on the seasoning mixture for Montreal smoked meat.

Montreal smoked meat is made with variable-fat brisket, whereas pastrami is more commonly made with the fat-marbled navel or plate cut. This is because "navel is much harder to find in Canada because of its British beef cut tradition". The use of brisket means that smoked meat is "not fattier throughout the cut, but it has a larger cap of fat, and it has a stringier texture, more fibrous. American-style pastrami is more marbled with fat and has a denser texture."

Montreal smoked meat is typically served in the form of a light-rye bread sandwich accompanied with yellow mustard. While some Montreal smoked meat is brine-cured like corned beef, with spices applied later, many smoked meat establishments prefer dry-curing directly with salt and spices.

== History ==
The origins of Montreal smoked meat are uncertain and likely unresolvable. Many have laid claims to the creation or introduction of smoked meat into Montreal. Regardless, all of these stories indicate the creators are of the Jewish Diaspora from Romania or Eastern Europe:

- Some point to Benjamin Kravitz, who founded Bens De Luxe Delicatessen & Restaurant in 1910, as the introducer of Montreal smoked meat. According to the Kravitz family, he used a brisket-curing method he recalled being practised by Lithuanian farmers. His first smoked meat sandwiches were made and sold from his wife's fruit and candy store.
- According to Eiran Harris, a Montreal historian, Herman Rees Roth from New York may have created the first smoked meat sandwich in 1908, selling them from his deli, the British American Delicatessen Store.
- In another claim by Bill Brownstein, the smoked meat was brought over in 1902 by Itzak Rudman, who was an accomplished salami and smoked meat maker who had a shop on de Bullion Street (formerly Cadieux Street).
- In yet another possibility, a butcher by the name of Aaron Sanft who arrived from Iași, Romania, in 1884 founded Montreal's first kosher butcher shop (Sanft Kosher Meat at 560 Craig Street (now Saint Antoine Street)) and likely made smoked meat in the Romanian style similar to pastrama.

== Presentation ==
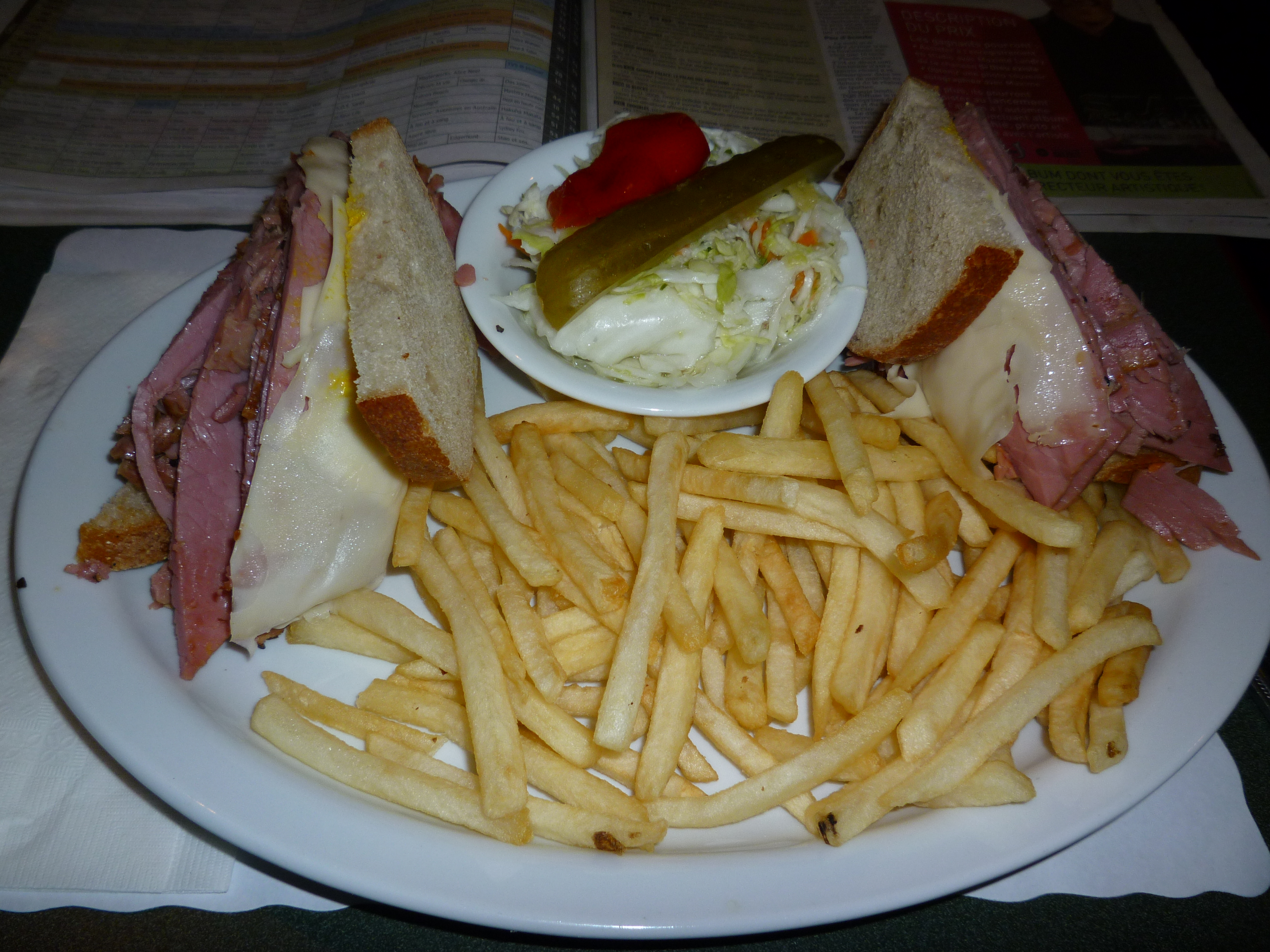
An atypical smoked meat sandwich topped with Swiss cheese, served with coleslaw, French fries and one quarter of a pickle. Generally, the authentic version of the sandwich would not include cheese given kosher dietary restrictions on mixing meat with dairy.

Montreal smoked meat is always sliced by hand to maintain its form, since doing so with a meat slicer would cause the tender meat to fall apart. Whole briskets are kept steaming and sliced up on demand when ordered in the restaurant to maintain its temperature.

Even when hand-cut, Montreal smoked meat produces a considerable amount of broken bits when sliced. These pieces are gathered together and commonly served with French fries, cheese curds, and gravy as smoked meat poutine or served over spaghetti with Bolognese sauce or even pizza.

Montreal-style smoked meat sandwiches are typically built with seedless, light rye bread, and piled with hand-sliced smoked meat about 5 cm (2 in) high, dressed with yellow prepared mustard. The customer can specify the amount of fat in the smoked meat:

- Lean: the lean and less flavourful end. Relatively healthy but dry.
- Medium and medium fat: the most popular cuts from the middle of the brisket. Occasionally, a sliced mix of lean and fat meats.
- Old-fashioned: a cut between medium and fatty and often cut a bit thicker.
- Fat: from the fat end of the brisket
- Speck: consists solely of the spiced subcutaneous fat from the whole brisket without meat.

== Cultural identity ==
Montreal writer Mordecai Richler, in his novel Barney's Version, sardonically described the spices used in the smoked meat at Schwartz's deli as a "maddening aphrodisiac" to be bottled and copyrighted as "Nectar of Judea".

Montreal smoked meat is offered in many diners and fast food restaurant chains throughout Canada. Montreal smoked meat has also been added in to Quebec dishes such as poutine. Along with bagels, smoked meat has been popular in Montreal since the 19th century and is identified as emblematic of the city's cuisine. Despite the food's origins in, and association with, Montreal's Jewish community and, contrary to what is sometimes asserted, delis are seldom certified as kosher.

After the Quebec government passed the Charter of the French Language (Bill 101) in 1977, the Office québécois de la langue française (OQLF) took action against the leading Montreal smoked meat delicatessen retailing imported kosher goods that did not meet its labelling requirements, an action perceived in the Jewish community as an unfair targeting and antisemitism. In particular, Dunn's got in trouble with the OQLF for having the English word "Smoked Meat" on the sign out front. Dunn's, along with other well-known delicatessen establishments, fought the OQLF's original order to change the name of "Smoked Meat" to "Boeuf Mariné" in order to conform to Quebec Language Law. They won the ruling on appeal by proving that if they did not advertise "Smoked Meat" they would confuse and anger customers. A good example of this was Parti Québécois MNA Gérald Godin who himself ordered the sandwich by its English name. Due to the work of Myer Dunn, under the ruling enacted in 1987, the French word "smoked meat" gained legal recognition in Quebec.

== See also ==
- Deli meat
- Cuisine of Quebec
- Montreal-style bagel
- Pastrami on rye
- Reuben sandwich
- List of sandwiches
- List of smoked foods
