= Pastramă =

Romanian cured meat

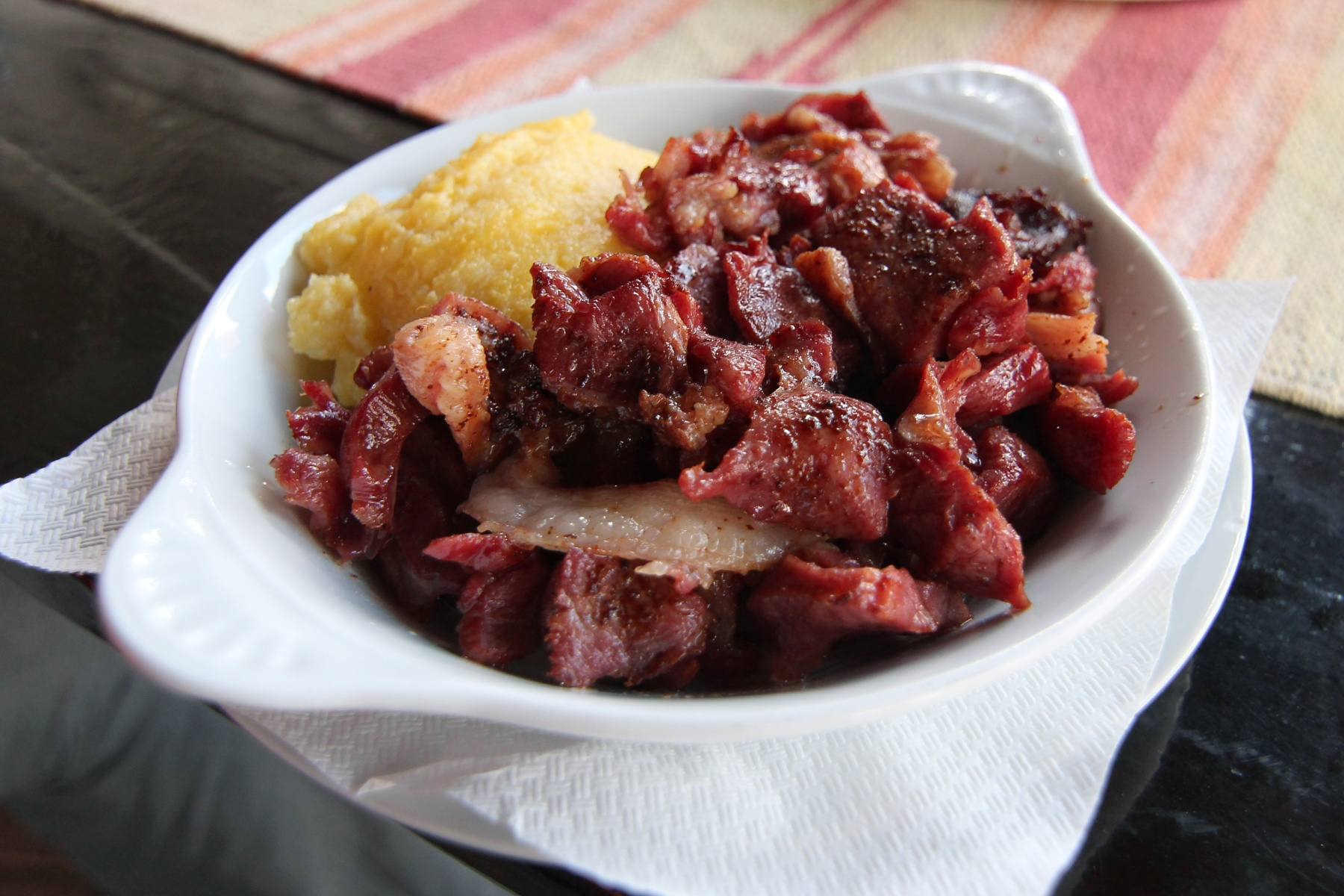

Pastramă is a popular delicatessen meat traditionally in Romania made from lamb and also from pork and mutton.

Pastramă was originally created as a way to preserve meat before modern refrigeration. For pastrami, the raw meat is brined, partly dried, seasoned with various herbs and spices, then smoked and steamed. In the beginning, pastramă was a specialty from Wallachia made from young ram's meat.

The word pastramă is etymologically rooted in the Romanian a păstra, which means "to keep" or "to preserve".

Pastramă was introduced by Romans to the city of Caesarea Mazaca in Anatolia, known as pastron.

A wave of Romanian Jewish immigration to the United States in the second half of the 19th century, introduced the Yiddish pastrame, becoming pastrami. The modified "pastrami" spelling likely was introduced to sound related to the Italian salami.

== See also ==
- List of meat dishes
- Pastirma
- Pastrami
- Schwartz's
