= Pastrami =

Meat preserved by partial drying, seasoning, smoking, and steaming

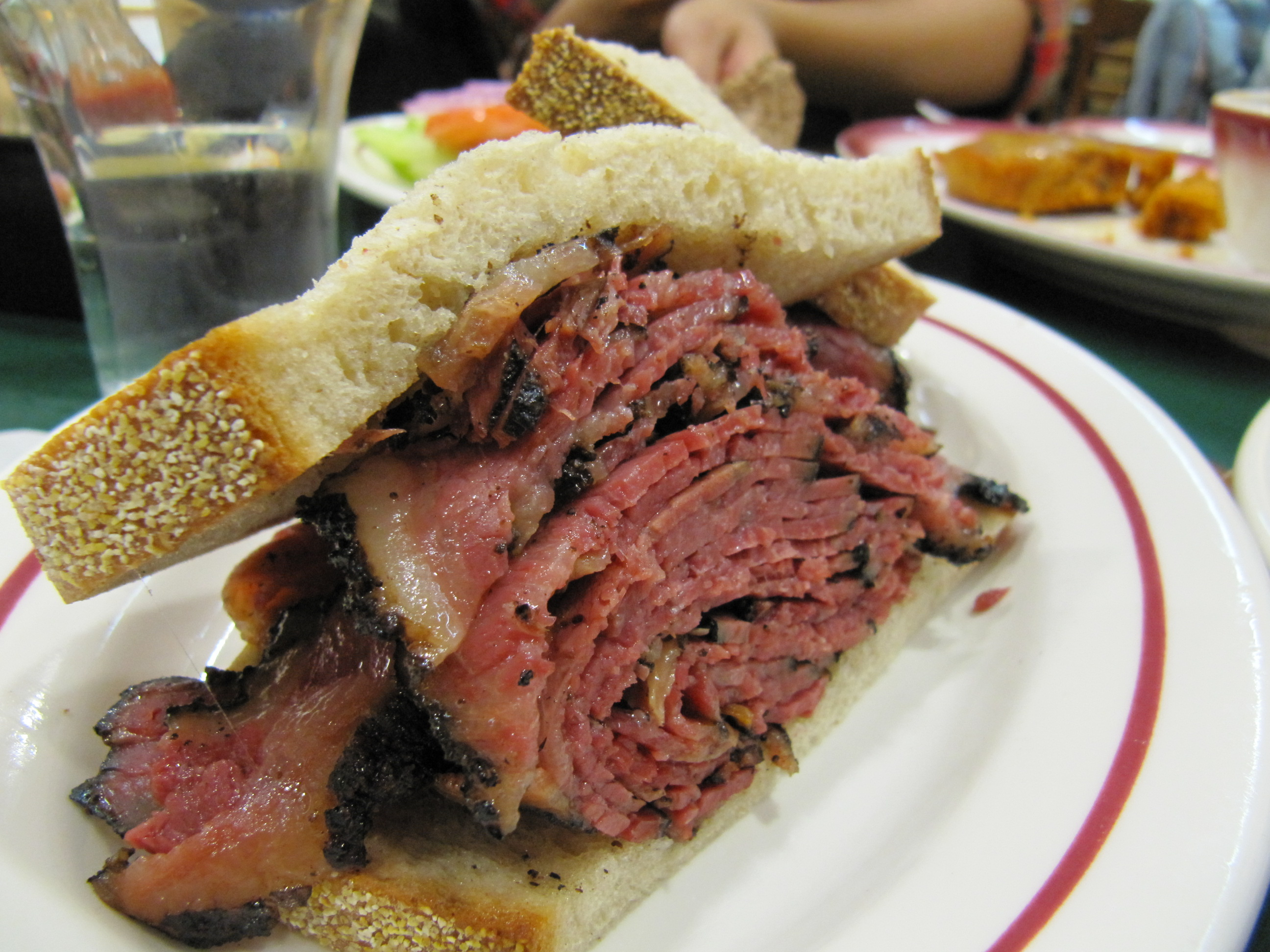
Ben's Best Deli, Rego Park, New York

Pastrami or pastromi is a type of cured meat in Jewish-American cuisine, originating in the Jewish community of Romania and surrounding regions, and usually made from beef brisket. The raw meat is brined, partially dried, seasoned with herbs and spices, then smoked and steamed. One of the iconic meats of American Jewish cuisine and New York City cuisine, hot pastrami is typically served at delicatessen restaurants on sandwiches such as the pastrami on rye.

== Etymology and origin ==
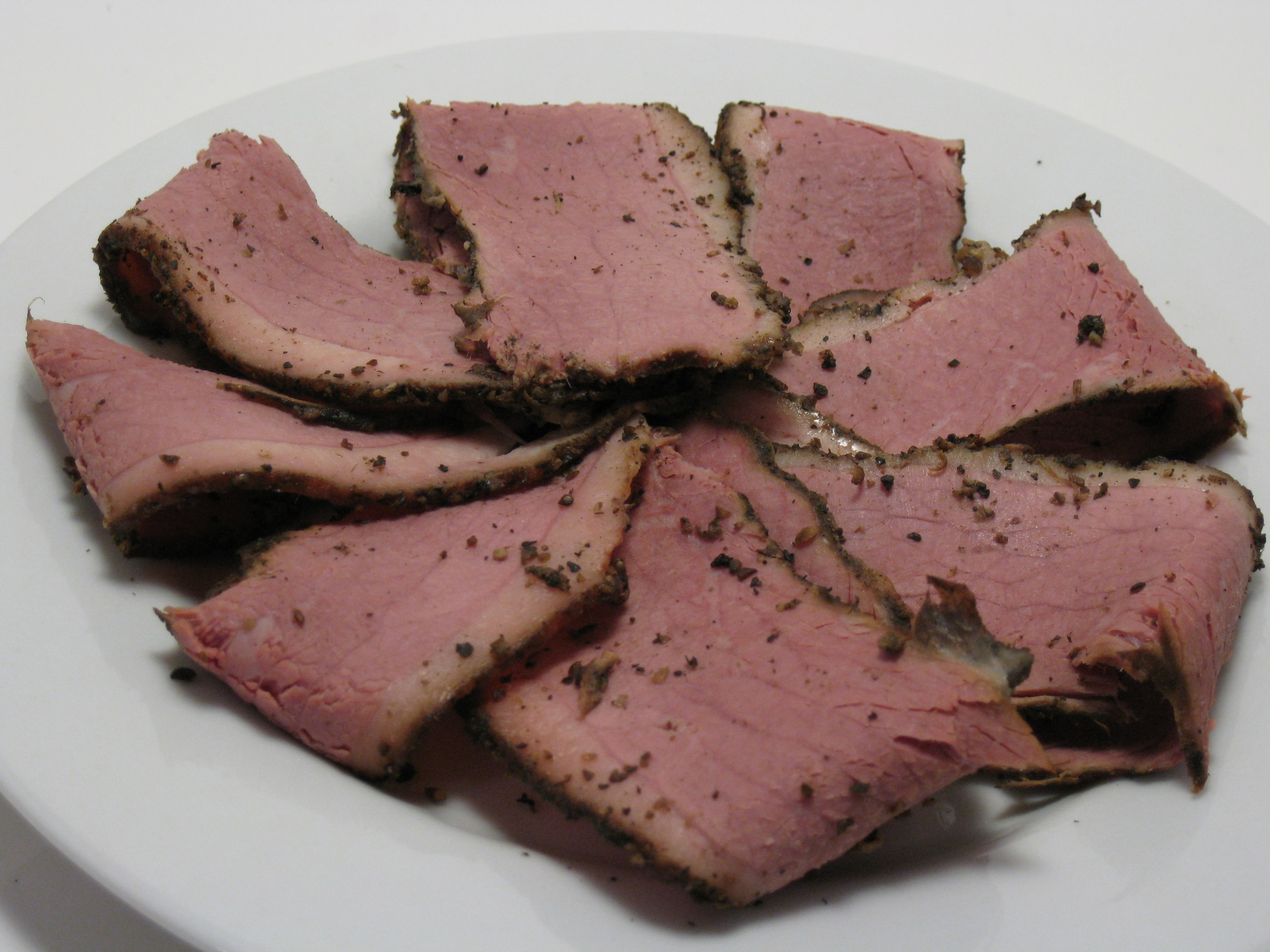
Slices of pastrami

The name pastrami comes from Yiddish pastrame, probably borrowed from Romanian pastramă, itself thought to be borrowed from Turkish pastirma.

Jews in the 10th and 11th century Alsace-Lorraine region consumed pickled meats (sometimes called picklefleisch or homen) which are believed to be a distant culinary ancestor to pastrami, but pastrami is thought to have been more directly a descendant from Turkey. The source of pastrami in the historical region called Bessarabia (present-day Romania and Moldova) is thought to be in Turkey, the North Caucasus, or Armenia, even though pastrami has differences in ingredients and preparation from the similar Turkish basturma. Sandwiches of pastrama on rye bread are not found in traditional Romanian cuisine, nor is Romanian pastrama identical to the Armenian or Turkish dish. Similar food is common in the Levant and Balkans, and pastrami's culinary origin might be separate from, and simply named in inspiration from the Turkish preparation.

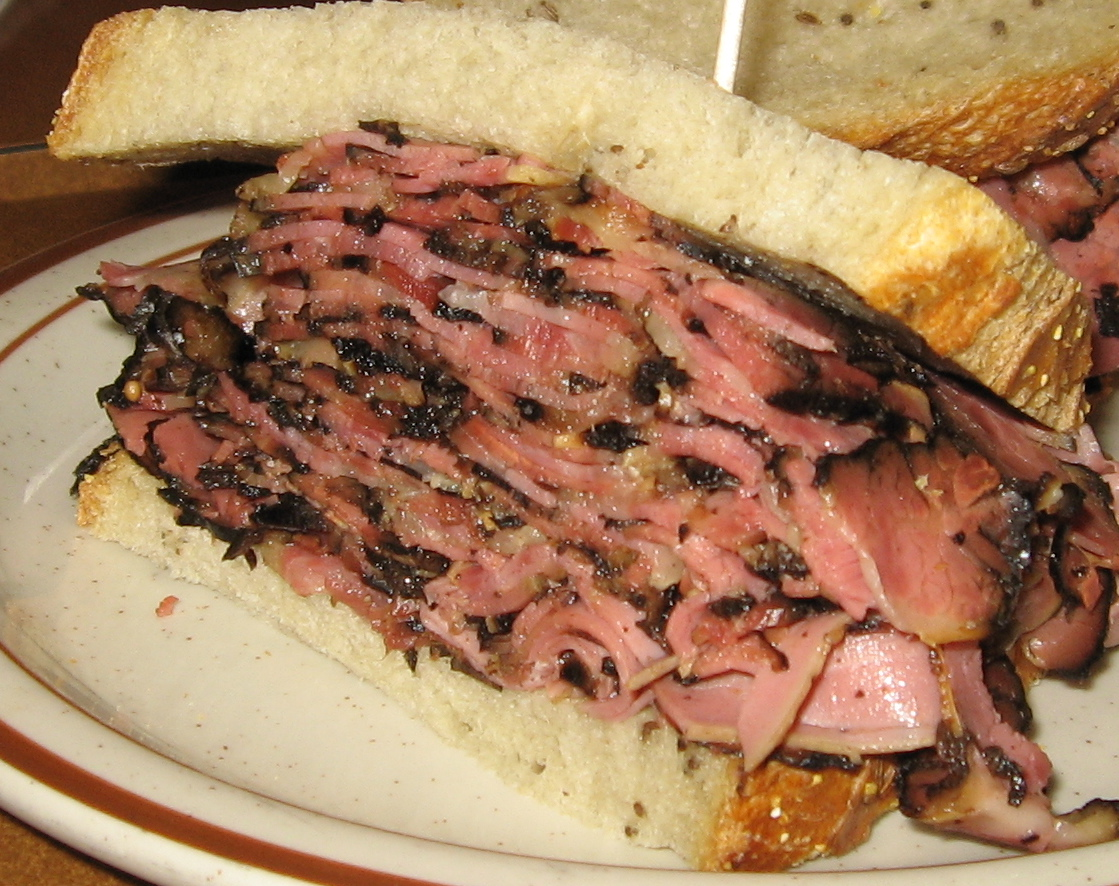
Pastrami from Canter's Deli

Pastrami was introduced to the United States in a wave of Jewish immigration from Bessarabia and Romania in the second half of the 19th century, as Yiddish pastrame. The modified "pastrami" spelling was probably introduced in imitation of the American English salami. Romanian Jews immigrated to New York as early as 1872. Among Jewish Romanians, goose breasts were commonly made into pastrami because they were available. Beef navel was cheaper than goose meat in America, so the Romanian Jews in America adapted their recipe and began to make the cheaper alternative beef pastrami.

According to his daughter Patricia Volk, Sussman Volk produced the first pastrami sandwich in the United States in 1887. Volk was a kosher butcher and New York immigrant from Lithuania. He prepared pastrami according to the recipe of a Romanian friend and served it on sandwiches out of his butcher shop. The sandwich was so popular that Volk converted the butcher shop into a restaurant to sell pastrami sandwiches. This story is apocryphal, but corroborated by Marcus Eli Ravage.

At least as early as January 1895, "Roumania pastrami" was being offered for sale in Butte, Montana.

== Preparation and serving ==
Pastrami is cured in brine, coated with a mix of spices such as garlic, coriander, black pepper, paprika, cloves, allspice, and mustard seed, and then smoked. Finally, the meat is steamed until the connective tissues within the meat break down into gelatin.

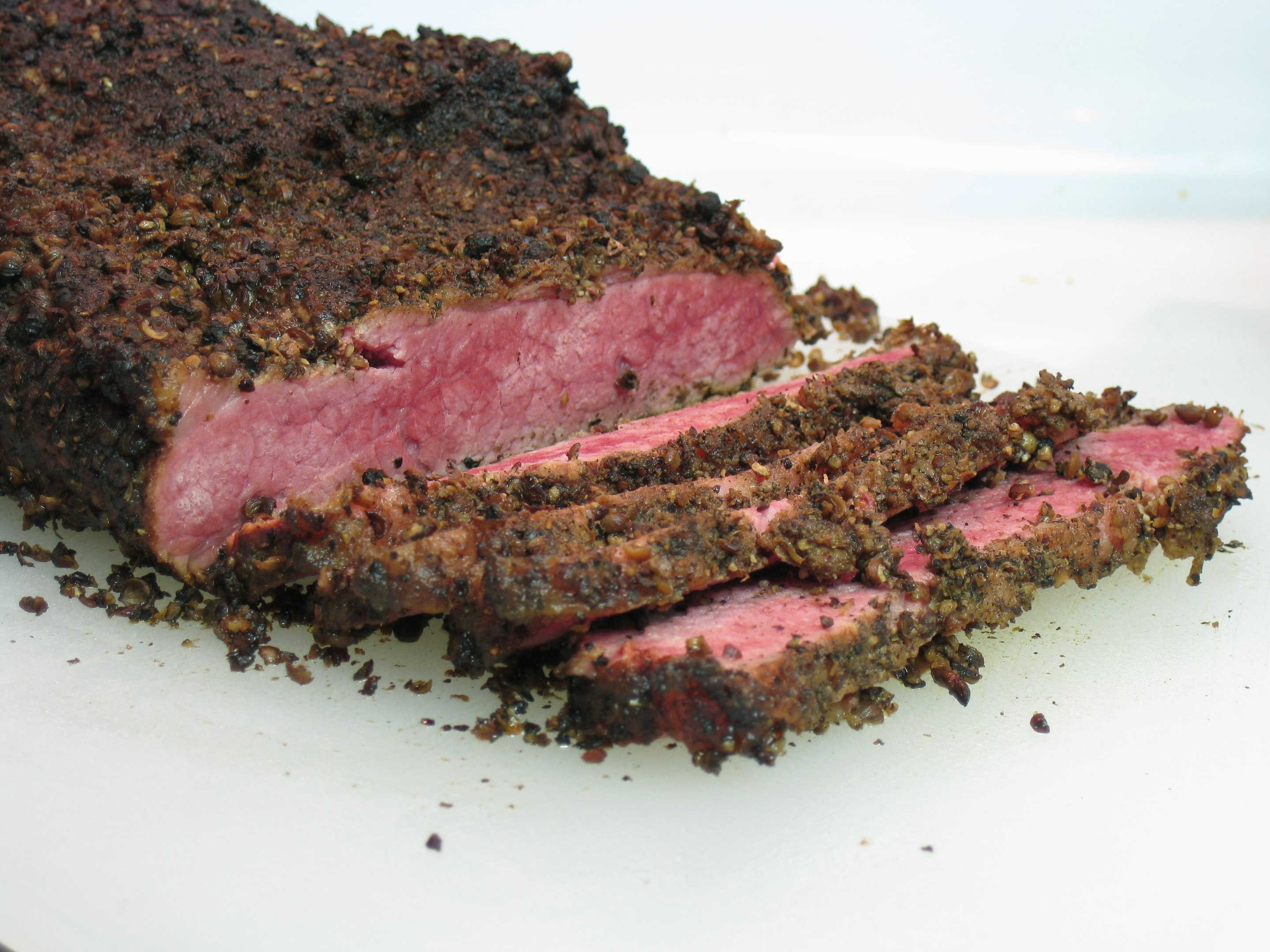
Brined and smoked pastrami brisket

While American pastrami is more commonly made with the fat-marbled navel or plate cut, Montreal smoked meat is made with brisket, in which the amount of fat is more variable.

Mutton and lamb are common meats used for Romanian pastramă, as is goat, and Jewish-American immigrants originally made it from goose. The Balkan and Turkish analogs of pastrami, pastramă and pastirma, are not specifically Jewish, and are made from a wide variety of meats, including beef, mutton, lamb, goat, goose, and pork.

American pastrami was formerly made from beef plate; and now more commonly from beef brisket, beef round, and turkey. New York pastrami is generally made from beef navel, the ventral part of the plate. This is because "navel is much harder to find in Canada because of its British beef cut tradition". The use of brisket means that smoked meat is "not fattier throughout the cut, but it has a larger cap of fat, and it has a stringier texture, more fibrous. American-style pastrami is more marbled with fat and has a denser texture."

Greek immigrants to Salt Lake City in the early 1960s introduced a cheeseburger topped with pastrami and a special sauce. The pastrami cheeseburger has since remained a staple of local burger chains in Utah.

== See also ==
- List of dried foods
- List of smoked foods
