= Schwartz's =

Restaurant in Montreal, Quebec

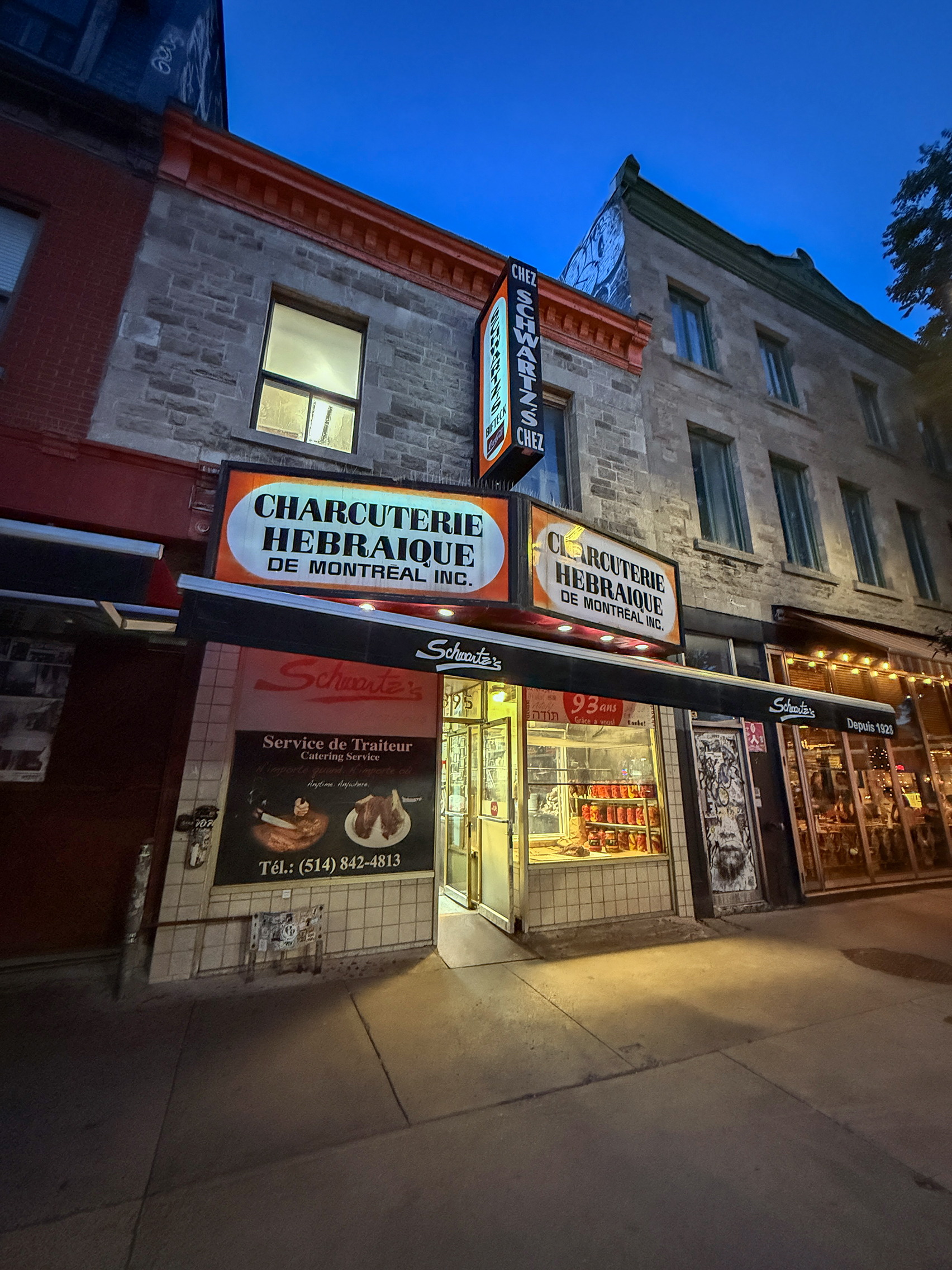
- Schwartz's storefront in 2026

- Location within Montreal

Restaurant information
- Established: 31 December 1928
- Food type: Kosher style Jewish delicatessen
- Dress code: Casual
- Rating: Recommended (Michelin Guide)
- Location: 3895 Saint Laurent Boulevard, Montreal, H2W 1X9, Canada
- Coordinates: 45°30′58.5″N 73°34′39.73″W
- Other information: CAD$9.2 million (2014 revenue)
- Website: schwartzsdeli.com

Schwartz's, also known as the Schwartz's Deli and the Montreal Hebrew Delicatessen, is a Jewish delicatessen restaurant and take-out, located on Saint-Laurent Boulevard in Montreal, Quebec, Canada. It was established in 1928, by Reuben Schwartz, a Jewish immigrant from Romania. Its long popularity and reputation has led to it being considered a cultural institution and landmark in Montreal.

== Offerings ==
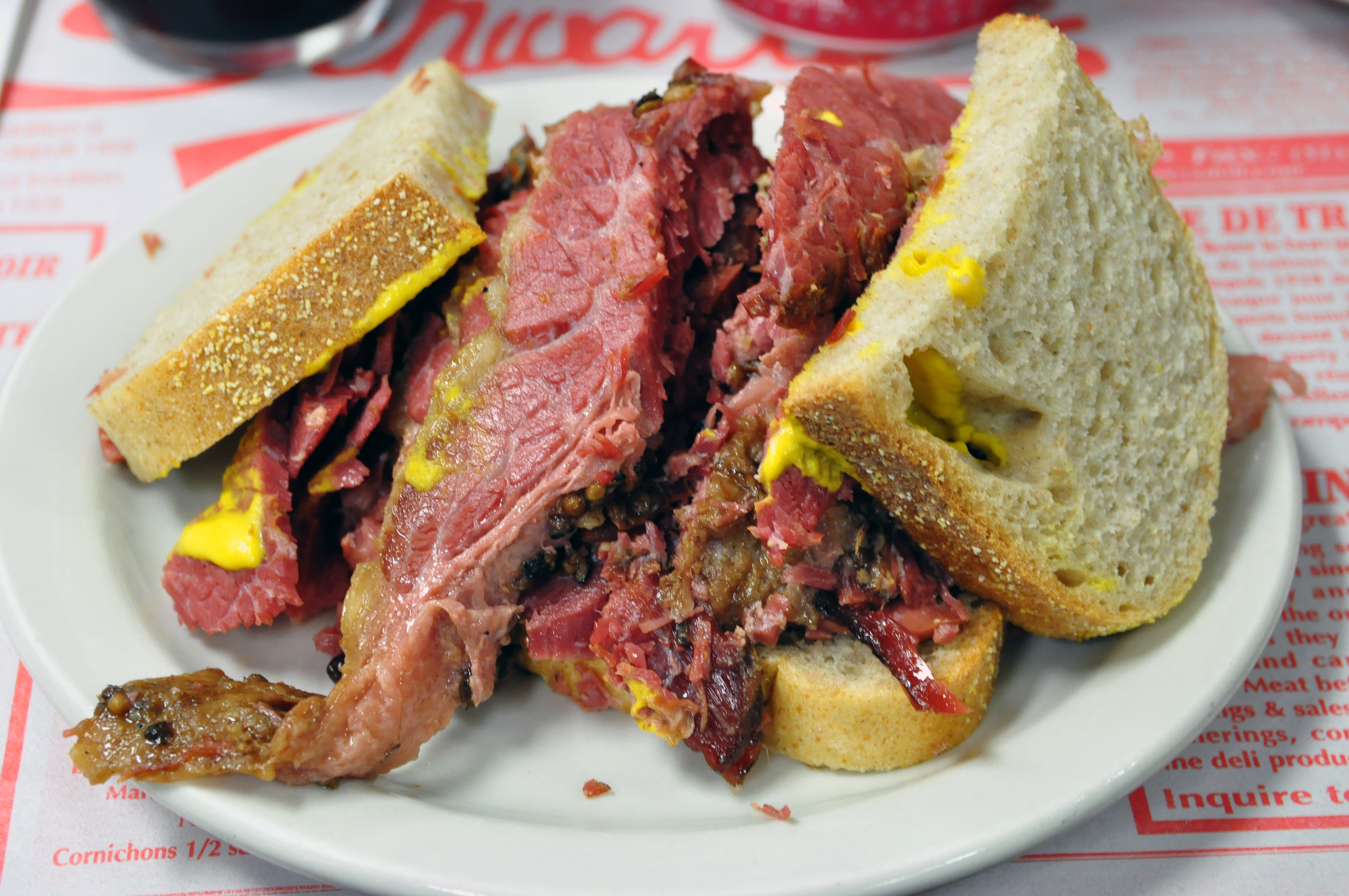
Schwartz's smoked meat

Schwartz's signature dish is a smoked meat sandwich served on rye bread with yellow mustard. The meat is served by the fat content: lean, medium, medium-fat or fat. Medium and medium-fat are the most popular. According to journalist Bill Brownstein, the classic Schwartz's meal includes a medium-fat sandwich, fries, half-sour pickle, coleslaw, red pepper, and a black cherry soda.

The staff of Schwartz's credits the unique flavour of their smoked meat to their mandatory 10-day meat curing time, the high turnover of their meat, and their brick smoke-house covered with over 90 years' worth of buildup. Schwartz's has used an electric smoker for over 50 years since the city has banned wood smoking in restaurants. Montreal writer Mordecai Richler, in his novel Barney's Version, sardonically described the spices used in the smoked meat at Schwartz's deli as a "maddening aphrodisiac" to be bottled and copyrighted as "Nectar of Judea".

Schwartz's is also credited with creating Montreal steak seasoning or Montreal steak spice when Morris "The Shadow" Sherman, a broilerman working at Schwartz's in the 1940s and '50s, began adding the deli-smoked meat pickling spices to his own rib and liver steaks. It was so popular that it was copied by other Montreal delis and steakhouses.

== History ==
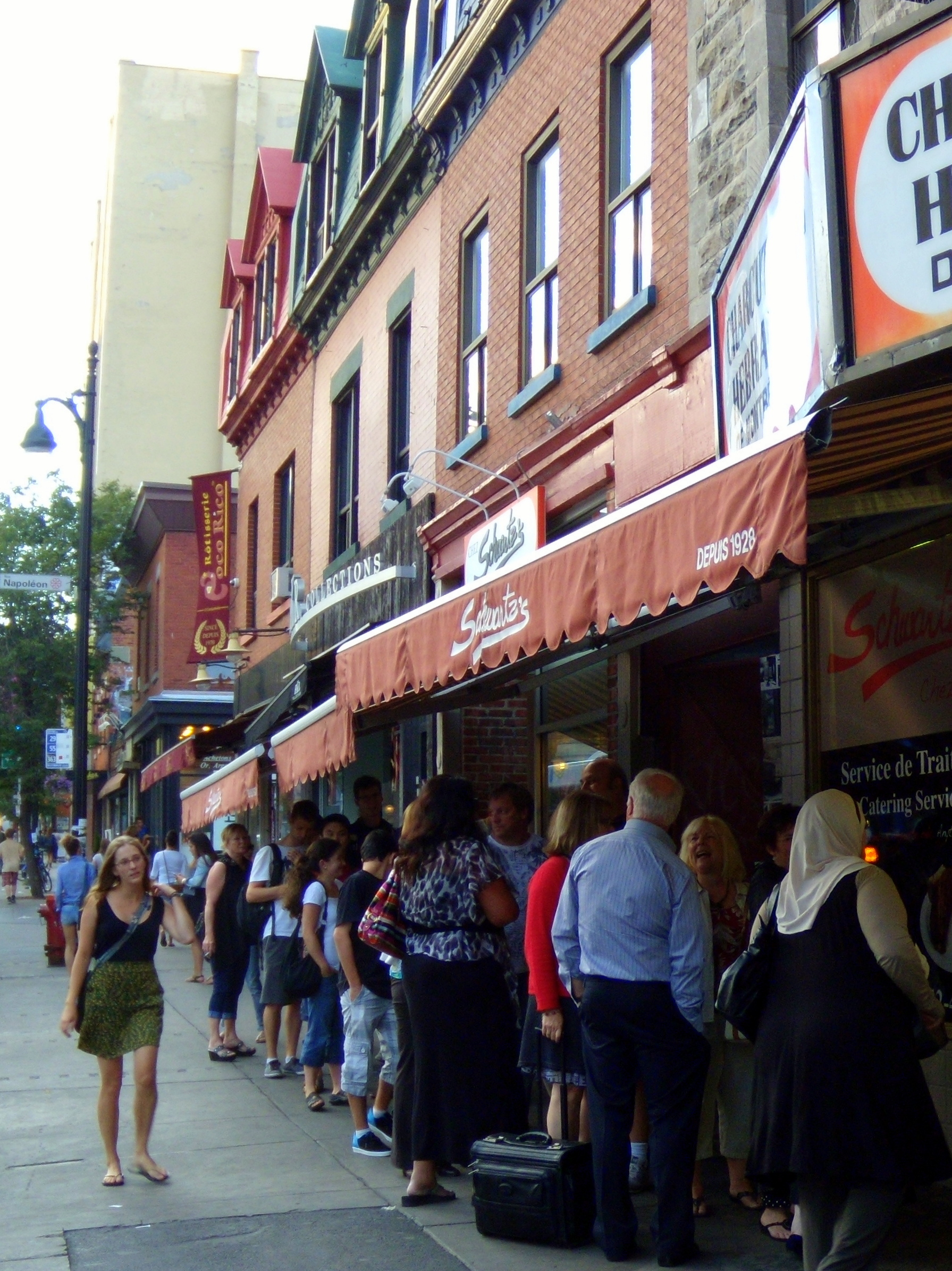
People lined up out the door

Schwartz's is one of the few original delicatessen restaurants in Montreal still remaining, the others being Lester's Deli, Dunn's Famous Deli and Snowdon Deli. Other notable long-time Montreal smoked meat delicatessens, which competed with Schwartz's but have since closed include Bens De Luxe Delicatessen & Restaurant (1908–2006), The Brown Derby (1955–2000), Main Deli Steak House (1974–2023) and Quebec Smoked Meat (1950–2023). Schwartz's still prepares its smoked meat and other offerings mostly in-house, while Bens and Main Deli abandoned that in favor of ordering pre-cooked smoked meat from another company, in 1992 and 2013, respectively, a cost-saving measure that led to the decline of their food quality and likely resulted in their eventual closures.

Smoked meat fans debated whether Schwartz's or Bens had the best smoked meat sandwich. Bens thin sliced meat was piled high between rye bread, while Schwartz's offers plates of thickly cut smoked meat.

The famed Main Deli Steak House opened right across the street in 1974 and operated until 2023, becoming Schwartz's main business rival. The two restaurants were often compared against each other in their patronage and the flavours of their Montreal-style smoked meat. While both establishments continued to be rated highly in recent years, Schwartz's frequently won 'Best Montreal Sandwich Award' which Main never managed. Furthermore, Schwartz's was always much more popular among tourists who lined up there for hours while ignoring the Main Deli, attributed to Schwartz's "worldwide fame that makes it a must-enjoy attraction for tourists after 95 years in existence". Perhaps because of this, a frequent customer of Main Deli said "From what I heard, many Montrealers preferred it to Schwartz's. It felt like it had more of the real traditional feel, while Schwartz's can feel kind of touristy."

When the controversial Charter of the French Language (Bill 101) became law in 1977, Schwartz's sign outside was forcibly changed from "Hebrew delicatessen" to "Charcuterie Hébraïque de Montréal". The Office québécois de la langue française (OQLF) took action against Schwartz's and other stores retailing imported kosher goods that did not meet its labelling requirements, an action perceived in the Jewish community as an unfair targeting and antisemitism. This coincided with a high-profile case brought by the OQLF against Schwartz's due to the apostrophe in the establishment's sign, which remains. Schwartz's, along with other well-known delicatessen establishments, also fought a ruling to change the name of "Smoked Meat" to "Boeuf Mariné" in order to conform to Quebec Language Law. They won the ruling by appeal by proving that if they didn't advertise "Smoked Meat" they would confuse and anger customers. A good example of this was Parti Québécois MNA Gérald Godin who himself ordered the sandwich by its English name. Under the new ruling, enacted in 1987, Smoked meat became a word in both Official languages of Canada.

=== Ownership ===
The deli has passed through several owners since its foundation:

1. Reuben Schwartz (1928–1971): Founded the "Montreal Hebrew Delicatessen" in 1928. Reuben Schwartz was described by many as a bad businessman and a supposedly nasty character (boozer, gambler, womanizer) whose family could not stand him.
2. Maurice Zbriger (1971–1981): A violinist and composer, Zbriger was eventually made a partner, and eventually, sole owner of Schwartz's, until his death in 1981. He took Reuben Schwartz into his home and created him 'manager for life.' Zbriger made Schwartz's a great success, and with the profits from the business, Zbriger spent many thousands of dollars organizing free concerts of his music. His story was documented in the National Film Board of Canada production The Concert Man.
3. Armande Toupin Chartrand (1981–1999): She began as a professional organizer and caretaker to Maurice Zbriger and through her service to him she was willed the delicatessen.
4. Hy Diamond (1999–2012): The only owner who has had a business background; for many years he was its accountant.
5. The Nakis and Angélil-Dion family (2012–present): A partnership consisting of Paul Nakis (involved in the Baton Rouge Restaurant chain among others); his granddaughter Anastasia; René Angélil and his wife Celine Dion; and Eric and Martin Sara (sons of Paul Sara, former owner, along with Angélil, of Nickels restaurant chain). Prior to the purchase, Dion and Angélil used to favor the Main Deli Steak House over Schwartz's.

== Potential expansion ==
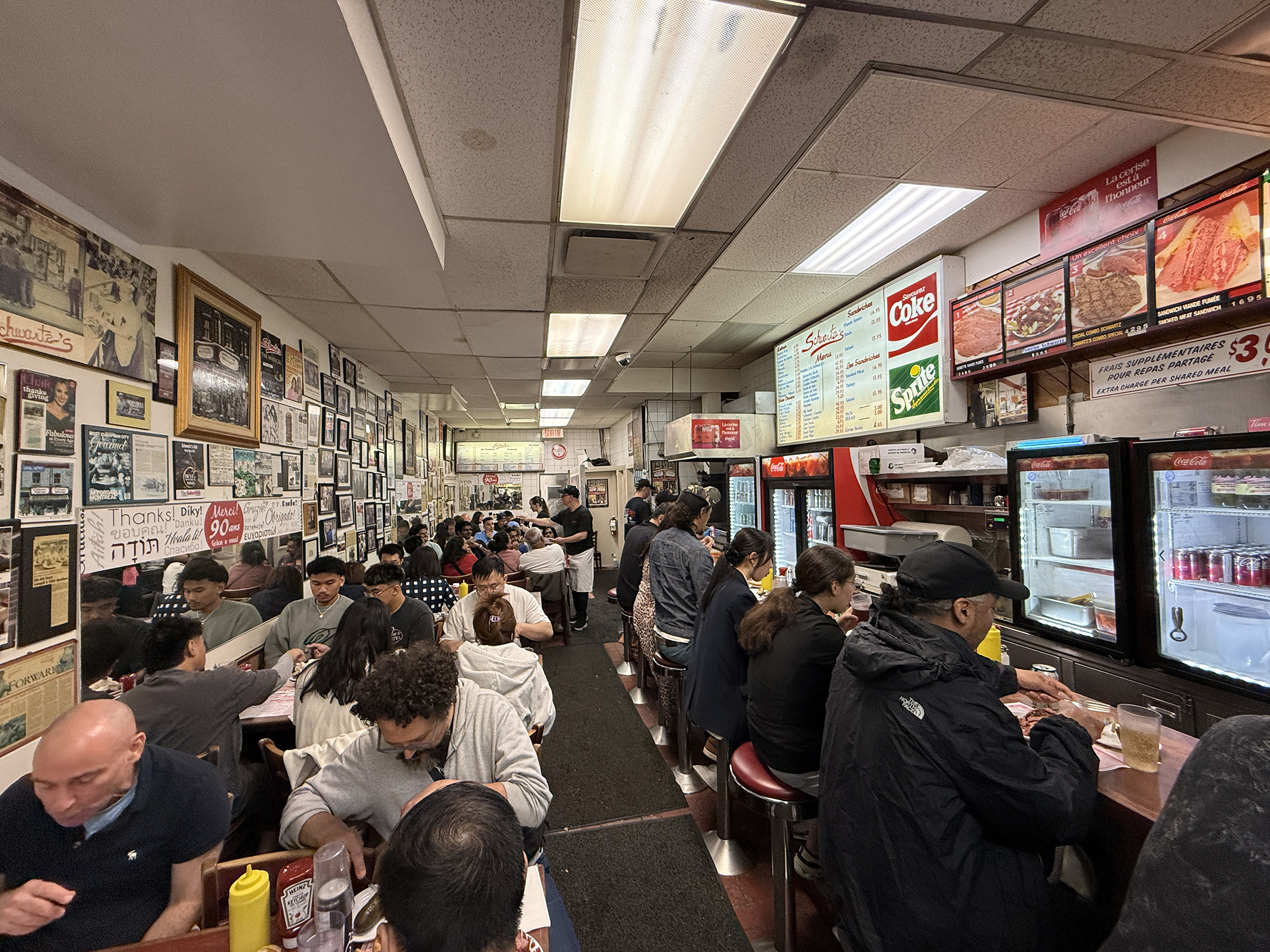
Interior in 2026

While the small size of Schwartz's restaurant has led to long lineups, the owners have preferred to remain since their historic establishment has proved an attraction to longtime customers and tourists, similar to Bens and Main who also refused to move, while Dunn's relocation proved controversial among its customer base since the new restaurant lacked the nostalgia of the original spot despite being larger. In the fall of 2008, Schwartz's opened a take-out location next door.

Several restaurateurs have offered to build Schwartz's as franchise operations in cities across North America, to which the owners have always refused. One of its rivals, Dunn's, had expanded via franchising with mixed success as detractors felt that this diluted the latter's once-storied brand, since smoked meat was shipped frozen from Montreal to these franchises rather than being prepared in-house. On 5 March 2012, the Nakis and Angelil-Dion families purchased Schwartz's, reportedly for $10 million. The new owners were again approached to franchise Schwartz's; however, they stated they have no intention of doing so.

On 28 February 2013, Schwartz's began using their trademark name on vacuum sealed pouches of smoked meat sold at IGA supermarkets in Quebec. This mass-produced (factory made) smoked meat product has since become available in other supermarkets across Canada.

== Recognition ==
In 2025, the business received a 'Recommended' designation in Quebec's inaugural Michelin Guide. Per the guide, a 'Recommended' selection "is the sign of a chef using quality ingredients that are well cooked; simply a good meal" and that the anonymous inspectors had found "the food to be above average, but not quite at [Michelin star] level."

== In media ==
In 2006, Montreal Gazette columnist Bill Brownstein wrote the book Schwartz's Hebrew Delicatessen: The Story, published by Véhicule Press. Schwartz's has also been the subject of numerous articles in Canadian and international publications. It has also been the inspiration for a theatre production about the deli: Schwartz's: The Musical. The restaurant has been the subject of two documentary films: The Concert Man by Tony Ianzelo and Chez Schwartz by Garry Beitel.

In 2020, Schwartz's is featured in an episode of the Netflix show Somebody Feed Phil.

== See also ==
- Bens De Luxe Delicatessen & Restaurant
- Fairmount Bagel
- Historic Jewish Quarter, Montreal
- List of Ashkenazi Jewish restaurants
- List of delicatessens
- Main Deli Steak House
- SumiLicious Smoked Meat & Deli
