= Beauty's Luncheonette =

Montreal diner founded in 1942

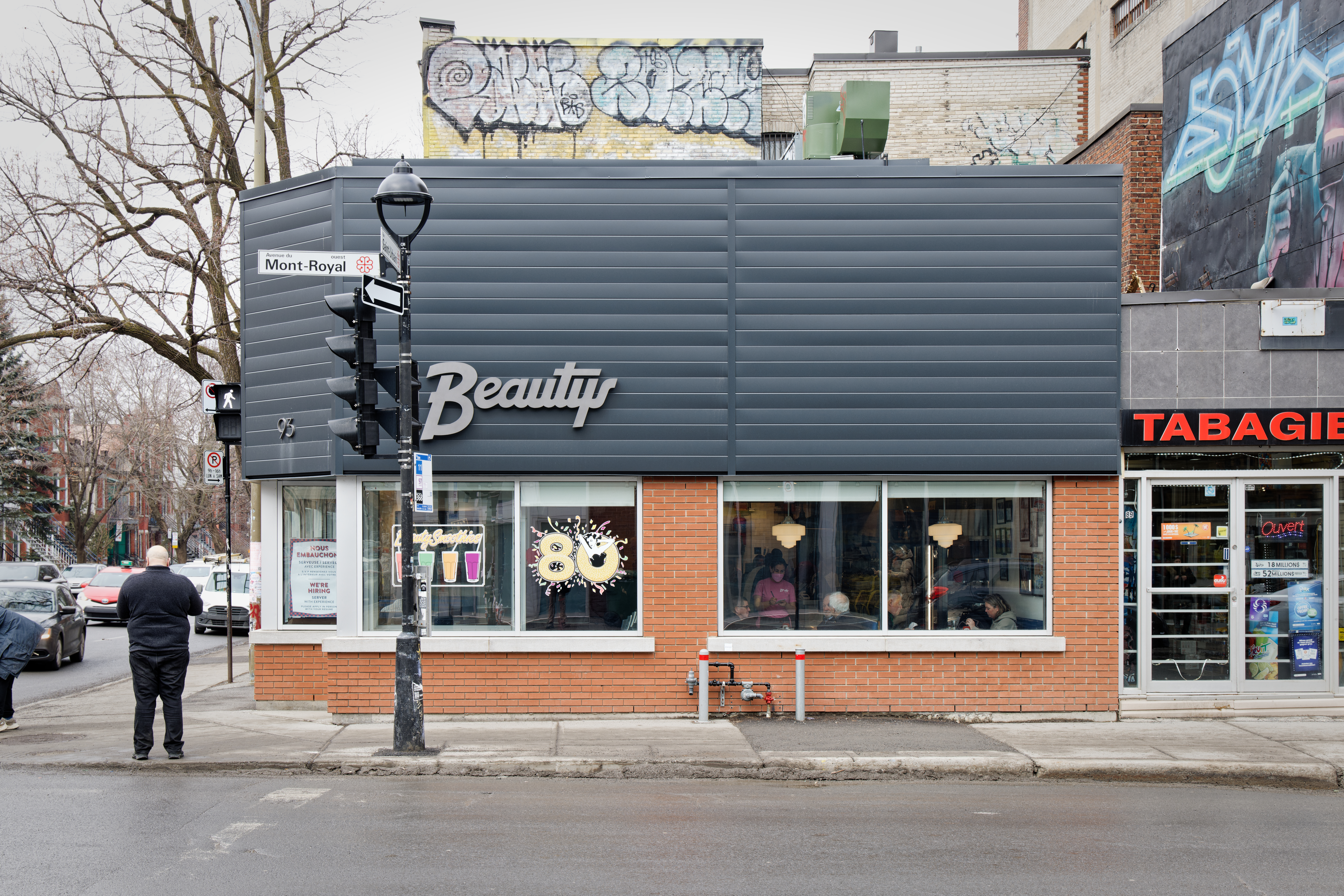
- The diner at Mont-Royal Avenue and Saint-Urbain Street in February 2024
- Interactive map of Beauty's Luncheonette

Restaurant information
- Established: 1942; 84 years ago
- Owner: Sckolnick family
- Previous owners: Hymie and Freda Sckolnick
- Food type: Diner; breakfast, brunch and lunch
- Location: 93 Mont-Royal Avenue West, Montreal, Quebec, H2T 2S5, Canada
- Coordinates: 45.5191°N 73.5875°W
- Seating capacity: 70
- Website: www.beautys.ca

Beauty's Luncheonette (also styled Beautys, and usually called simply Beauty's) is a diner at 93 Mont-Royal Avenue West, on the corner of Saint-Urbain Street, in the Plateau-Mont-Royal borough of Montreal, Quebec, Canada. It was founded in 1942 by Hyman "Hymie" Sckolnick (1921–2017) and his wife Freda (née Segal; died 2008), who paid $500 for a stationery store and snack bar called the Bancroft in what was then the heart of the city's Jewish garment district and began serving hot dogs and quick lunches to factory workers. Neighbours nicknamed the place "Beauty's" after Hymie's bowling nickname; the name became official when the family enlarged the business into a full restaurant in 1966.

The diner is known for two dishes attributed to Freda Sckolnick: the Mish-Mash, an omelette of hot dog, salami, green pepper and fried onion that the restaurant's operating company registered as a Canadian trademark in 1989, and the Beauty's Special, a St-Viateur sesame bagel with cream cheese, smoked salmon, tomato and onion. Its weekend service, which grew out of Sunday breakfasts for weekday lunch regulars, has been credited with popularizing brunch in Montreal. Hymie Sckolnick greeted customers at the counter or the door almost every day for 75 years, until shortly before his death at the age of 96, and the restaurant has remained in the family: his son Larry joined the business in 1966 and Larry's daughters, Elana and Julie Sckolnick, run it today.

Beauty's is widely described as a Montreal landmark and institution and is often grouped with Wilensky's, Schwartz's and Moishes among the city's historic Jewish eateries. It has attracted celebrity patrons for decades, was included in the Saveur 100 in 2000, and was visited by Anthony Bourdain for his television series The Layover in 2011. The diner closed in March 2020 at the start of the COVID-19 pandemic and reopened in June 2021 after an extensive renovation that preserved its 1950s lunch-counter character.

== History ==
=== The Bancroft snack bar ===
In the first half of the twentieth century the blocks around Mont-Royal Avenue and Saint-Urbain Street were the heart of Montreal's Jewish garment district, the neighbourhood later celebrated in the novels of Mordecai Richler. The corner property housed a stationery store with a snack counter known as the Bancroft, next door to Bancroft School on Saint-Urbain Street. The senator Leo Kolber, who attended the school, recalled in his memoirs that during the October 1939 provincial election, when he was ten, he earned a few dollars running next door for sandwiches, coffee and soft drinks for the poll workers stationed at the school. (Note: Kolber, writing in 2003, calls the counter "Beauty's Restaurant", the name it acquired after the Sckolnicks bought it in 1942.)

=== The Sckolnicks ===
Hyman Sckolnick was born in the Plateau in August 1921, the son of Jewish immigrants who had arrived from Russia in 1915. He later described the neighbourhood of his youth as "100% Jewish", a place where "everyone worked in the needle trade". He started work at eleven, selling soft drinks and snacks in the district's restaurants and factory buildings and saving what he could; according to La Presse, he was orphaned at twelve, separated from his sisters, and put to work in the neighbourhood's textile factories. As a teenager he met Freda Segal, also the daughter of immigrants. (Note: Accounts of how the couple met differ. Sckolnick told The Times of Israel in 2016 that he met Freda in 1937; Seven Days reported in 2024, after interviewing his granddaughter Julie, that they met at fourteen while working at the Ideal Dress factory around the corner; La Presse reported in 2021 that they met when he was delivering food to factory workers in the early 1940s. The couple were married for 66 years when Freda died in January 2008.)

In 1942, at the age of 21, Sckolnick bought the Bancroft for $500, putting $200 down. (Note: Sckolnick gave the $200 figure to The Times of Israel in 2016; his friend Hymie Polansky told CBC that the seller took "$500 down".) According to his friend Hymie Polansky, who had practically grown up at the diner, the seller was a local gambler who agreed to the deal on condition that he could keep running his card games in the back. The physician Phil Gold, who entered grade one at Bancroft School in September 1942, wrote in his memoir that his mother bought him milkshakes and school supplies that autumn at "the Bancroft Stationary [sic] Store and Snack Bar, which had just been purchased by Hymie and Freda Sckolnick". Under the Sckolnicks the store became the Bancroft Coffee Shop, at least officially; to the neighbourhood, where the couple had grown up, it was simply Beauty's, the nickname Hymie had earned in his bowling league.

In its early years the store was about half its present size and stayed open late, selling five-cent candy and chocolate alongside books and paper, with pinball machines and hot dogs at the counter. Bagels sold for two cents and coffee for a nickel; an attempt to put bacon and eggs on the menu failed because, as Sckolnick put it, "the customers were all Jewish, and nobody bought it in those days". The couple built a trade in hot dogs and sandwiches for garment workers who had little time to eat, and Freda's speed (her son later compared her to an octopus) gave the counter a reputation for fast lunches. When weekday lunch customers started asking for a late Sunday breakfast, the Sckolnicks began opening on Sundays; the family describes this as the origin of Montreal's brunch tradition, and food writers have called Beauty's one of the first places in the city to serve brunch. The family later bought out the bakery next door to expand. Among the children who hung around the counter was the future film-industry entrepreneur Mel Hoppenheim, who as a boy hawked ice cream and candy to Beauty's lunchtime customers, earning a hot dog and a drink from the Sckolnicks before he went back to school.

=== Becoming Beauty's ===
The Bancroft name outlasted the change of owners: a photograph in Gold's memoir, captioned "The Bancroft Snack Bar (aka Beauty's), early 1950s", still shows the Bancroft signage, and according to Le Devoir and La Presse the business formally took the name Beauty's only in 1966. By then the neighbourhood was emptying as the Jewish community moved to newer districts such as Snowdon and Ville Saint-Laurent, and in 1966 Sckolnick decided to go fully into the restaurant business, enlarging the premises and naming the new restaurant Beauty's. His son Larry joined the business the same year. Word spread that Beauty's served the best breakfast in the city, and by the early 1980s, as the journalist Nathalie Petrowski wrote in Le Devoir, the Jewish community, though it had largely moved away, still gathered there on weekends, joined by customers from every part of the city who came at seven in the morning, at noon or at three in the afternoon. The restaurant's operating company, Beauty's Restaurant Inc. (Restaurant Beauté Inc.), was incorporated federally in September 1981, and it later stated in trademark filings that the Beauty's name had been used for restaurant services since February 1978.

Beauty's began selling T-shirts printed with the name in 1976 and sweatshirts in 1978, and by the late 1980s it was selling about a thousand T-shirts a year over the counter. When a clothing company applied to register "Beauty's" as a trademark for women's clothing in 1986, the restaurant opposed the application, and in 1994 the Trademarks Opposition Board refused registration of the mark for T-shirts, sweaters and sweatsuits, the goods closest to the restaurant's merchandise.

Petrowski's September 1982 feature, "L'héritage de Duddy Kravitz", retraced Richler's Saint-Urbain Street through Beauty's, Wilensky's and the St-Viateur bagel bakery; according to the librarian Zachary Baker the tour won a Quebec journalism prize, and Petrowski recalled in her memoirs that she received the Prix Judith-Jasmin for a report on Hymie Sckolnick. She described a recently renovated room with a chrome, discotheque-like look, metallic blue stools and grey wall tiles, and a menu of fresh-squeezed orange juice, warm St-Viateur bagels, a salmon omelette, the "mish mash" and the "Beauty special". A 1991 Fodor's guide warned visitors to expect a line on weekend mornings, and a 1992 guide called Beauty's "a Montreal landmark", open every day for breakfast, lunch and an early dinner, closing at 6 p.m. In 2000 the American food magazine Saveur placed the diner at number 51 in its annual "Saveur 100" list, noting that customers, among them Tony Bennett, Howie Mandel and Jack Lemmon, queued for the Beauty's Special and the Mish-Mash.

=== Family business, 1980s–2017 ===
Eater wrote after his death that Sckolnick had become "nearly synonymous with the diner that bears his former bowling nickname". His day began with a visit to the market before he reached the diner at five in the morning; in his later years he took up a post on the first stool at the counter or in a chair by the door, greeting customers with "You're always welcome!" and managing the weekend lineups. He liked to say that he had cut down from working ten days a week to seven. In his era the restaurant opened 364 days a year, closing only for Christmas. He turned down offers to franchise the name, saying he wanted "a small operation, a restaurant done right". Freda, whose cooking had been the diner's main draw in its early years, had left the restaurant by 2004; she died in January 2008. Larry and, in time, his daughters progressively took over the day-to-day running of the business. His daughter Elana, a McGill University graduate who had spent more than ten years in marketing and philanthropic development, joined the family business in 2005 in order to work alongside her father and grandfather; her sister Julie, who had worked at the diner part-time as a teenager, also joined the business.

In 2011 Anthony Bourdain filmed at the diner for The Layover; he was served by Sckolnick himself and remarked that Beauty's was "where they pretty much invented breakfast around here". The critic Alan Richman, in a 2016 Town & Country article that declared Montreal the best restaurant city in North America, wrote of Sckolnick that "he is always there", and told the Montreal Gazette that "there should be a statue of Hymie Sckolnick erected ... He's unbelievable, the single best thing in Montreal — maybe even the world." The Times of Israel reported later that year that only about a fifth of the clientele was still Jewish; Sckolnick described the diner as "the last of the old-time diners".

Sckolnick kept greeting customers until about two months before his death. He died at home on November 27, 2017, at the age of 96, after 75 years at the restaurant. The diner closed on the day of his funeral, and the family asked that donations be made to a fund in his name for the Jewish General Hospital's hemodialysis unit, where he had been treated in his last years. Tributes included the writer David McGimpsey's description of the diner as "the very heartbeat of the neighbourhood" and Richman's description of Sckolnick as "an institution, nothing less". Larry Sckolnick and his daughters continued to run the restaurant.

=== Pandemic closure and renovation ===
Beauty's closed on March 17, 2020, in the first pandemic lockdown, though it sent care packages to front-line workers that spring. When the premises were boarded up in late spring, rumours spread that the diner had closed for good; in June the family announced that it was renovating the space, a project Larry Sckolnick said had been planned for some time and for which the pandemic seemed the right moment. In August 2020 the family expected to reopen that autumn, saying the work had been slowed by the pandemic, the construction holiday and limits on the number of workers allowed on site; Larry Sckolnick later said they had expected the job to take a few months.

The renovation, designed by Rachel Gilmore and Heidi Rowsell of the Montreal firm HRH Design and reported by the Gazette to have cost in the seven figures, rebuilt the kitchen, grill, counter and bathrooms, raised the ceiling, added large windows on both street frontages and new lighting, and restored the aluminium panelling behind the counter that the room had carried decades earlier. A blue-and-white tiled floor, seven new counter stools, Formica tabletops and navy-blue banquettes were installed, with more free-standing tables and chairs than before, which opened up the room and allowed wheelchair access, and a tile mosaic of the logo with the date 1942 was laid at the entrance. A new sign kept the traditional lettering. Larry Sckolnick said that regulars had told him not to change a thing, "but, in my head, I'd be thinking, 'It's falling apart.'" The diner reopened on June 28, 2021, after fifteen months, with about seventy seats and a pared-down menu; customers lined up early on the first morning.

In April 2025 Elana Sckolnick was among the business owners who publicly opposed a city plan to remove about 450 parking spaces along Saint-Urbain Street for a protected bike lane and a bus lane. In March 2026 she told the Gazette, which described her as the restaurant's owner, that road works that had largely closed Mont-Royal Avenue from May to November 2025, together with the loss of parking and stopping space on Saint-Urbain, had hurt customers and deliveries; revenue had fallen by about 30 per cent in a year and the weekend lineups had disappeared. The borough councillor Alex Norris called Beauty's one of the "iconic businesses ... that have been here for generations" and said the borough planned a delivery zone across the street.

== Name ==
The name comes from Hymie Sckolnick's bowling nickname. He was, by his own account, a good bowler; Bill Brownstein of the Gazette wrote that it was "not a reference to the owner's looks" but to his rolling "a beauty of a ball", and Gold recalled that "whenever he threw a strike or a good spare, people would shout 'Beauty!'" The nickname attached itself to the snack bar in the 1940s and became the restaurant's official name with the 1966 expansion. (Note: A 2011 guidebook instead places the official adoption of the name "sometime in the '70s", and the company's trademark filings claim use of "Beauty's" for restaurant services only from February 1978.) Larry Sckolnick has been credited with coining the longer form "Beautys Luncheonette" and with designing the restaurant's logo. A trademark registered by the company in 1983 was a logo in which the word "Beauty's" appears in black with a red heart-shaped apostrophe; the word mark "Beauty's" was registered for restaurant services in 1987. The form "Beautys", without an apostrophe, has appeared on the restaurant's merchandise since the 1970s, was registered as a word mark for restaurant services in 2001, and is used on the restaurant's sign and website.

== Menu and signature dishes ==
Beauty's has never been kosher: Jewish specialties such as chopped liver, blintzes and latkes appear on the menu beside bacon, grilled cheese and other diner fare. The menu has changed little over the decades, and its best-known dishes are both credited to Freda Sckolnick. The Mish-Mash is a browned scramble or omelette of eggs with sliced hot dog, salami, green pepper and fried onion, served with home fries and a bagel. Hymie Sckolnick called it "a cure for all that ails you – especially a hangover", and the Gazette wrote at his death that the restaurant served what many food critics considered one of the best hangover breakfasts in the city. The company registered the name as a Canadian trademark for omelettes in 1989, claiming use since at least 1965. The Beauty's Special is a sesame-seed bagel from the St-Viateur Bagel bakery, spread with cream cheese made for the restaurant and topped with smoked salmon (lox), tomato and onion. It was Hymie Sckolnick's own favourite, taken with a chamomile tea, and a 1994 student guide called it "the ultimate bagel-and-lox creation in Montreal".

Other items include cheese blintzes, potato latkes, challah French toast, pancakes and waffles, rice pudding, a "challah dog" (a hot dog encased in sesame-speckled dough) and fresh-squeezed orange juice, along with house-made soups and fruit smoothies sold under the marks Beautysoupe (claimed in use since 1998) and Beautysmoothies (since 1999); by 2012 the menu listed a dozen omelettes. Larry Sckolnick told La Presse in 2004 that sushi would never be served there. Prices have risen over the decades: a breakfast combination that once cost 65 cents was $10 to $15 by 2012, and in 2024 the Mish-Mash cost $20 and the Special $17.

=== Trademarks and the 2019 Mish-Mash dispute ===
Beauty's Restaurant Inc. holds a portfolio of Canadian trademarks, including "Beauty's" and "Beautys" for restaurant services, "Beautys" for T-shirts, sweatshirts and hats sold through the restaurant, "Beautysoupe" and "Beautysmoothies". The Mish-Mash registration, renewed in early 2019, had rarely if ever been enforced when, in October 2019, the restaurant's lawyers sent cease-and-desist letters to other Montreal diners that listed a "Mish-Mash" omelette, among them Bagel Etc. on Saint Laurent Boulevard and Cosmo's in Notre-Dame-de-Grâce, both of which had served a dish of that name since the 1980s. The letters asked the restaurants either to credit Beauty's on their menus or to rename the dish, and to make a goodwill donation of $100 to the Jewish General Hospital. Larry Sckolnick declined to discuss the letters beyond saying that the name was trademarked and the matter was in the hands of lawyers. Both restaurants complied: Bagel Etc. renamed its version "the Mont-Royal" and Cosmo's called its own "the House Omelette". A Montreal trademark lawyer writing in the Gazette argued that Beauty's had to police the mark or risk losing it and that its modest demands had made compliance easy, while the American technology blog Techdirt questioned whether a mark left unenforced since its 1989 registration could survive a challenge that the term had become generic.

== Premises ==
The diner occupies the corner premises, with windows on both Mont-Royal Avenue and Saint-Urbain Street. Before the 2021 renovation the Ottawa Citizen found "a distinctly 1950s diner feel" in the room's booths, steel back wall and counter facing the short-order cooks, and noted the nostalgia added by the logo, the posters, the press clippings at the entrance and the black-and-white postcards of the founders as a young couple, sold at the cash. The renovated interior kept the deep-blue upholstery, chrome trim and counter-stool seating, and Larry Sckolnick said a wall of memorabilia would display photographs of his father and of well-known regulars. A mural depicting the two founders has been painted on the building's exterior.

== Reception and legacy ==
Beauty's has been called "Montreal's most iconic diner", "a city landmark" and "a Montreal must since 1942" by the local press, and La Presse has counted it, with Moishes and Wilensky's, among the city's "restaurants mythiques". Radio-Canada featured it in a 2014 report on the city's oldest restaurants, alongside Schwartz's, Wilensky's and La Binerie Mont-Royal, and the author Joe King listed it in From the Ghetto to the Main as one of the Jewish landmarks of the Main, a restaurant whose décor had changed little since the early 1940s and where "a visit ... is a step back in time". The Museum of Jewish Montreal's "Beyond the Bagel" walking tour of Jewish food in the Plateau and Mile End has included the diner, and in 2021 the museum hosted Larry and Elana Sckolnick in an online roundtable on Montreal's Jewish restaurants. Eater has written that it is "highly plausible that Beautys invented the concept of the Montreal brunch" and that "at the very least, the iconic diner popularized it".

The weekend lineup has long been part of the experience. Larry Sckolnick recalled the young people of the 1970s who arrived with large appetites; later guides described a crowd of neighbourhood residents recovering from a night of clubbing, hipsters arriving around ten for weekend brunch and, according to the Toronto Star, McGill students who "start wandering up the hill" by mid-morning. The 2008 Zagat guide to Montreal called it the "place to be for Sunday brunch or any lunch" and a "quintessential diner experience" where Hymie Sckolnick's schmoozing made the wait in line bearable.

The restaurant has drawn entertainers for decades. Sckolnick recalled serving the Mish-Mash to Frank Sinatra, Dean Martin, Jerry Lewis, Jack Lemmon, Dustin Hoffman and Tony Bennett, and later customers included Jennifer Lawrence, Bruce Willis, Ben Kingsley, Chris Noth and Howie Mandel. Photographs of celebrity visitors hang on the walls, and a long-serving server said the stars "all patiently waited their turn in line". The television host Jimmy Kimmel, asked by Bon Appétit in 2009 for his favourite place to eat outside the United States, answered: "I love Beauty's Restaurant in Montréal." The diner also appears in the memoirs of Montrealers who grew up nearby, such as Kolber and Gold, in the obituaries of Hoppenheim, and in Richler-themed journalism such as Petrowski's feature. It has been recommended in guides to Montreal's Jewish food and brunch by Travel + Leisure, the Toronto Star and Le Devoir, and the Gazette critic Lesley Chesterman named it one of her four favourite breakfast spots in the city.

== See also ==
- Wilensky's
- Schwartz's
- Mile End, Montreal
- List of diners
