= Bagg Street Shul =

Synagogue in Montreal, Canada

Congregation Temple Solomon
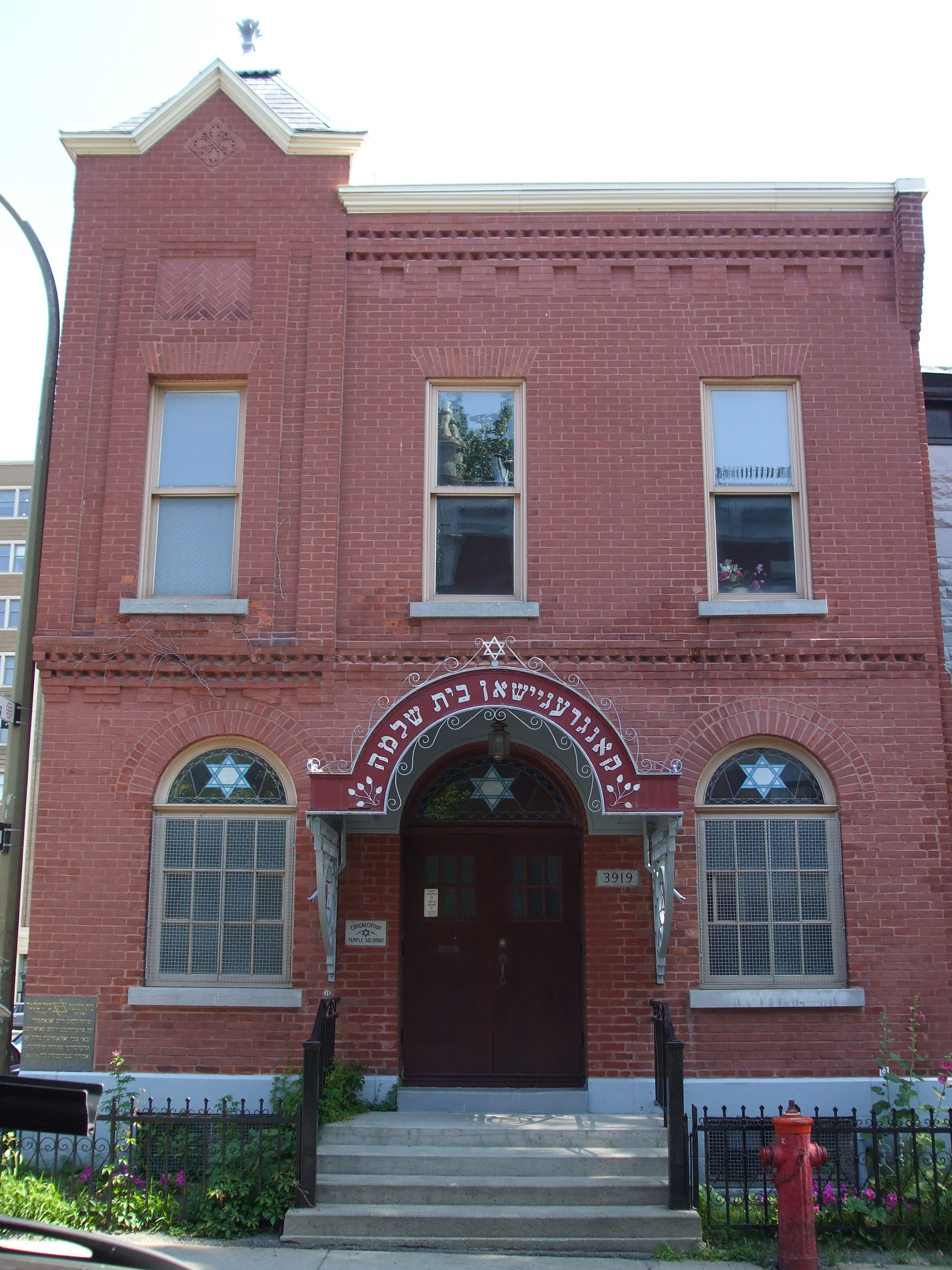
- Bagg Street Shul

Religion
- Affiliation: Orthodox Judaism
- Province: Quebec
- Status: Active

Location
- Location: Clark Street, Montreal, Quebec, Canada
- Interactive map of Congregation Temple Solomon
- Coordinates: 45.516033°N 73.578685°W

Architecture
- Completed: 1899

Specifications
- Capacity: 350
- Materials: Red brick

Website
- baggstreetshul.com

The Bagg Street Shul or Beth Shloime (formally Congregation Temple Solomon) is an Orthodox synagogue located at the intersection of Clark Street and Bagg Street in the Montreal Plateau neighbourhood of Montreal, Quebec, Canada.

In the early 1900s, fueled by heavy immigration, a large Jewish community was established in Montreal's Plateau region, around Saint Laurent Boulevard, that supported at least a dozen synagogues at its peak. The Plateau and Mile End neighbourhood once had over 90 sites and buildings serving as synagogues, with Bagg Street Shul being the last still-functioning synagogue in the area. The congregation started to decline in the 1950s, as many Jews moved further west in Montreal to the growing suburban boroughs of Côte Saint-Luc, Hampstead, Saint-Laurent or to other parts of Canada. The synagogue remains in operation today with a small congregation for Shabbat morning services.

== Interior ==
The synagogue's building, a red-brick converted duplex on Clark Street, was constructed in 1899. The congregation purchased the building and moved there in 1921. The sanctuary seats 350. The interior of the synagogue is in the style of pre-war Eastern European synagogues, featuring light blue walls and ceilings, highly ornamental lights and fixtures, as well as a U-shaped women's gallery on the second floor with paintings depicting the twelve zodiac animals surrounding the sanctuary. The zodiac animals were depicted with a Canadian lens, with a painted bison instead of a ram for the Hebrew month of Iyar, and a painted moose instead of a bull for the Hebrew month of Nisan.

The Torah ark, marble staircase, pews, bimah, and chandeliers were moved to the synagogue from the McGill College location of the Congregation Shaar Hashomayim Synagogue. These items were purchased from the Shaar Hashomayim in 1918 for $1,500 (more than $27,000 in 2024 dollars). The building was recognized as a heritage site in the 1990s by Quebec's Minister of Culture and by the City of Montreal.

The Bagg Street Shul is the second oldest synagogue still operating with its original congregation in its original location in Quebec. As of 2008, the congregation had 50 member families. The Museum of Jewish Montreal highlights and visits the exterior of the Bagg Street Shul on a number of their walking tours.
