= Place Versailles =

Shopping mall in Montreal, Canada

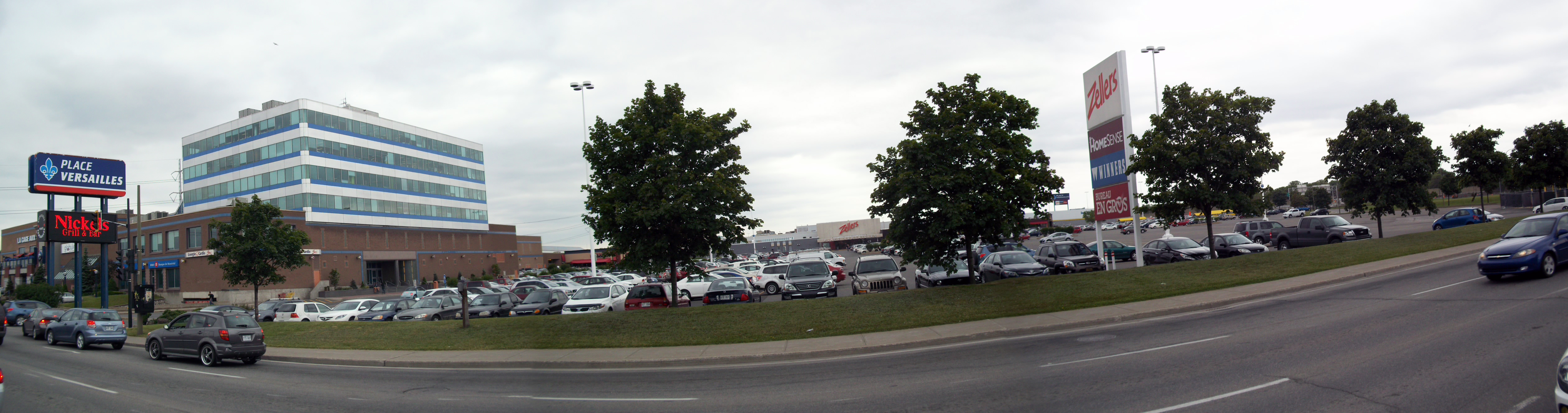
- Coordinates: 45.5918°N 73.5407°W
- Address: 7275, rue Sherbrooke Est; Montreal, Quebec; H1N 1E9
- Opened: November 7, 1963
- Developer: Lanabar Realty Inc.
- Manager: Place Versailles Inc.
- Owner: Place Versailles Inc.
- Num. of stores: 225
- Num. of anchor tenants: 4
- Parking: Outdoor
- Public transit: Radisson station Terminus Radisson; Société de transport de Montréal Buses
- Website: www.placeversailles.com/en

Place Versailles is a shopping mall located at the corner of Sherbrooke Street East and Highway 25 in the Mercier–Hochelaga-Maisonneuve borough of Montreal, Quebec, Canada. With its 225 stores, it is the largest enclosed shopping centre on the Island of Montreal. Its anchors are Canadian Tire, Maxi, Winners/HomeSense and Bureau en Gros.

Most of the mall is one storey high, but a section of the mall, which was added in the 1980s, has two floors. Place Versailles is situated next to the Radisson metro station and is less than 2 km south of the Galeries d'Anjou mall.

== History ==
Place Versailles officially opened on November 7, 1963 with 30 stores. Upon its opening, Place Versailles was the first enclosed shopping mall in the Montreal area. Its 30 stores included Steinberg, Miracle Mart and Greenberg. There was also in the parking the Cinema Versailles with its two theatres, one for English films and the other for French ones. The stores of Place Versailles totalized 350,000 sq ft (33,000 m^{2}) and the land of the complex was 2,000,000 sq ft (190,000 m^{2}). Today, the original section of Place Versailles can be recognized as the corridor of Canadian Tire and Maxi.

Pascal's opened a new store on August 21, 1969. At 91,000 sq ft (8,500 m^{2}), it was the largest of Pascal's stores and one of the biggest locations of any hardware outlet built at the time.

On March 15, 1973, the Hudson's Bay Company opened a The Bay department store of 134,000 sq ft (12,400 m^{2}).

From 1973 to 1987, Place Versailles was anchored by The Bay, Miracle Mart, Steinberg and Pascal's.

Miracle Mart at Place Versailles was rebranded under the M brand name on August 19, 1987; one of the last stores in Montreal to transition to the new nameplate.

In the late 1980s, Place Versailles expanded again and a new section was built with two floors, instead of one floor as in the rest of the mall.

On May 16, 1991, the Pascal's hardware chain went bankrupt. The store at Place Versailles closed at the end of July 1991.

Fabricville opened its current store on May 13, 1992.

Following the bankruptcy and liquidation of the M retail chain in June 1992, the Place Versailles store was closed on August 29, 1992. Also in 1992, Steinberg was converted to Maxi. From then on and until about 2003, Place Versailles was anchored by The Bay, Maxi, Zellers and Rona - Le Quincailler.

Hudson's Bay Company closed The Bay store at Place Versailles during the last quarter of 2003. The Bay's anchor space has since been dismantled by Winners/Homesense, Globo, Style Exchange (today Urban Depot), Safari, Sports Experts, Dollarama and McDonald's.

Rona closed in 2005 and Bureau en Gros took its space a year later.

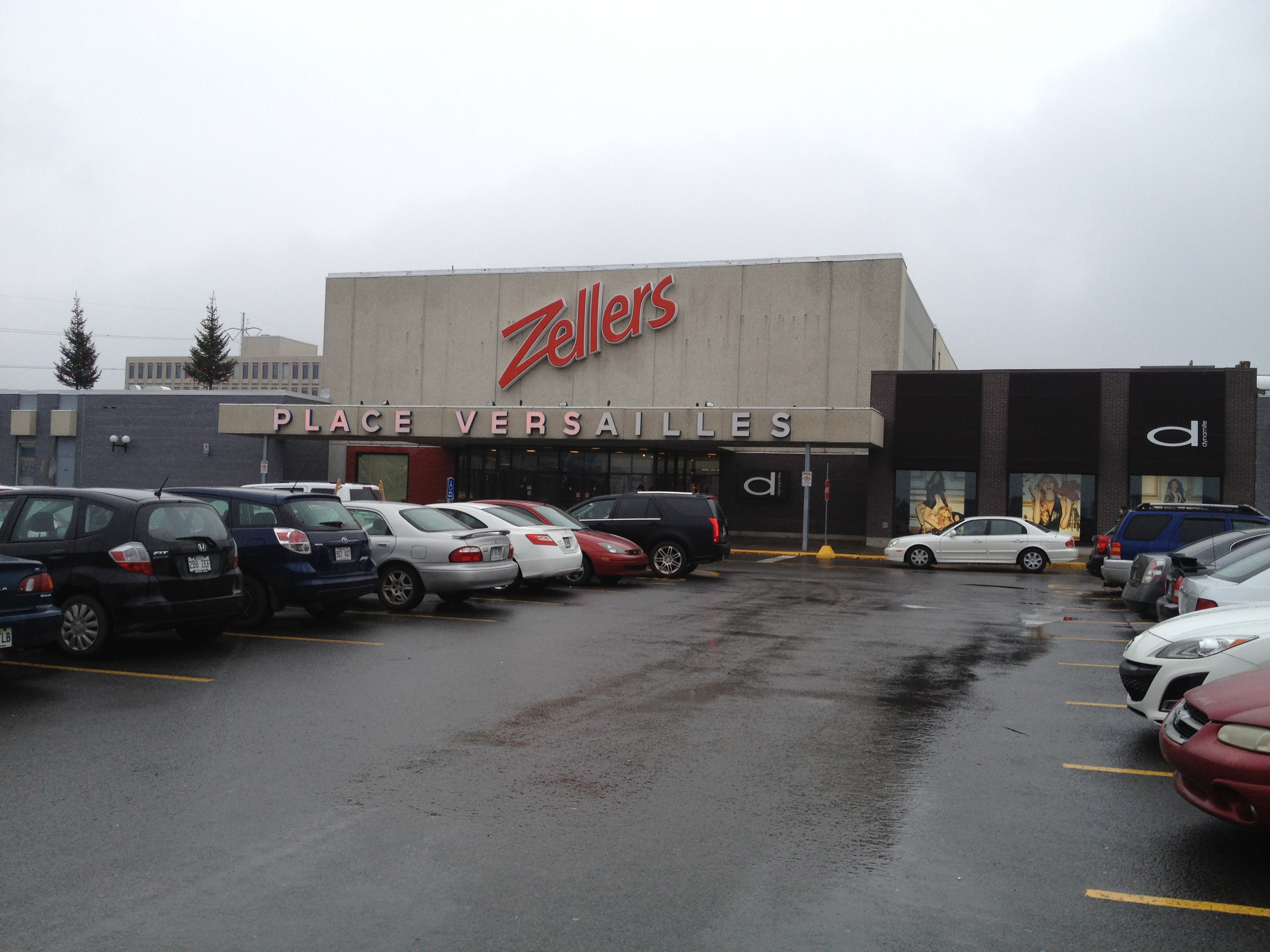
Zellers in 2012

Quebec sports-themed restaurant chain La Cage aux Sports opened its 50th restaurant in history at the mall in 2010, on the mall’s second floor. The restaurant can also be accessed from the outside of the mall via an elevator connecting the parking lot to the restaurant. The first sporting events shown at the restaurant were an NHL hockey game between the Montreal Canadiens and the Ottawa Senators, followed by the martial arts event UFC 121, whose main card was highlighted with a clash between Brock Lesnar and Cain Velasquez. During the 2015 FIFA Women’s World Cup tournament in which Canada was the host nation, the La Cage of the mall was featured on Fox Sports’ Garbage Time with Katie Nolan as a popular sports bar for U.S. soccer fans.

Zellers closed its doors in 2012 and was replaced by Target on September 17, 2013. Target did not want the former Zellers entrance that connected directly to Place Versailles' food court and, as a result, it was replaced by a graphic water fountain that the mall claims on its website to be the first in North America. Target closed in 2015 and lease sold to Canadian Tire in May 2015.

== Redevelopment ==
On June 1, 2024, it was reported in La Presse that Place Versailles is expected to be demolished in the coming years and be replaced with condo buildings that can be able to accommodate more than 5,000 people, a school, and a hotel. A design plan illustrating what the future space would look like has not been released yet, and the demolition of the mall to allow for the construction of the condos, school and hotel still needs to be approved by both the Mercier–Hochelaga-Maisonneuve borough and the Office de Consultation Publique de Montréal (OCPM). Shortly after the news of the mall’s future demolition broke, the mall released a statement on Facebook saying that it was “regrettable” that multiple media outlets reported “erroneous” information about the condo construction project being the end of Place Versailles, stating that the mall was entering a period of “renewal” and “innovation”. It was then later reported in CBC News that only 516,000 sq ft (47,900 m^{2}), corresponding to slightly under 30% of the mall’s current surface area, would remain for commercial use once the demolition and construction work is completed.

On June 3, 2024, La Presse later reported that the total cost of the demolition and construction work is expected to amount to roughly $2.2 billion, with the work being divided into phases, and is not expected to begin for another two or three years. That same day, the Mercier–Hochelaga-Maisonneuve borough approved of the project proposal, which meant that the proposal was now sent to the OCPM, awaiting its decision. The following day, the first artist rendering of the future space was revealed to the public. Constructions are expected to start in 2026 and take up to 25 years to complete, with the work split into phases.

== 2017 Santa Claus incident ==
In 2017, the mall faced criticism for promoting their Santa Claus' arrival to be on November 11, which is when Remembrance Day is observed in Canada. Furthermore, their Santa would be arriving at 10 a.m., one hour before the 11 a.m. Remembrance Day ceremonies would take place in Ottawa. Local veterans were quick to shun the mall for their decision, claiming that it showed a "lack of respect" towards Canadian veterans, especially given that 2017 marked the 100th anniversary of the Battle of Passchendaele, a key battle that took place during World War I. Requests were made for the mall to reschedule Santa's arrival, with some also asking to delay his arrival until once the ceremonies have concluded, but the mall kept his arrival date and time unchanged. Their Santa Claus was scheduled to make his entrance via helicopter and due to logistical concerns beyond the mall's control, his arrival could not be rescheduled to a different day. The mall did however try to make amends to the veterans over this issue in a Facebook post that has since been deleted and apologized for their decision.

== See also ==
- Galeries d'Anjou
- List of largest shopping malls in Canada
- List of shopping malls in Montreal
