= Galeries d'Anjou =

Coordinates: 45°36′02″N 73°33′52″W

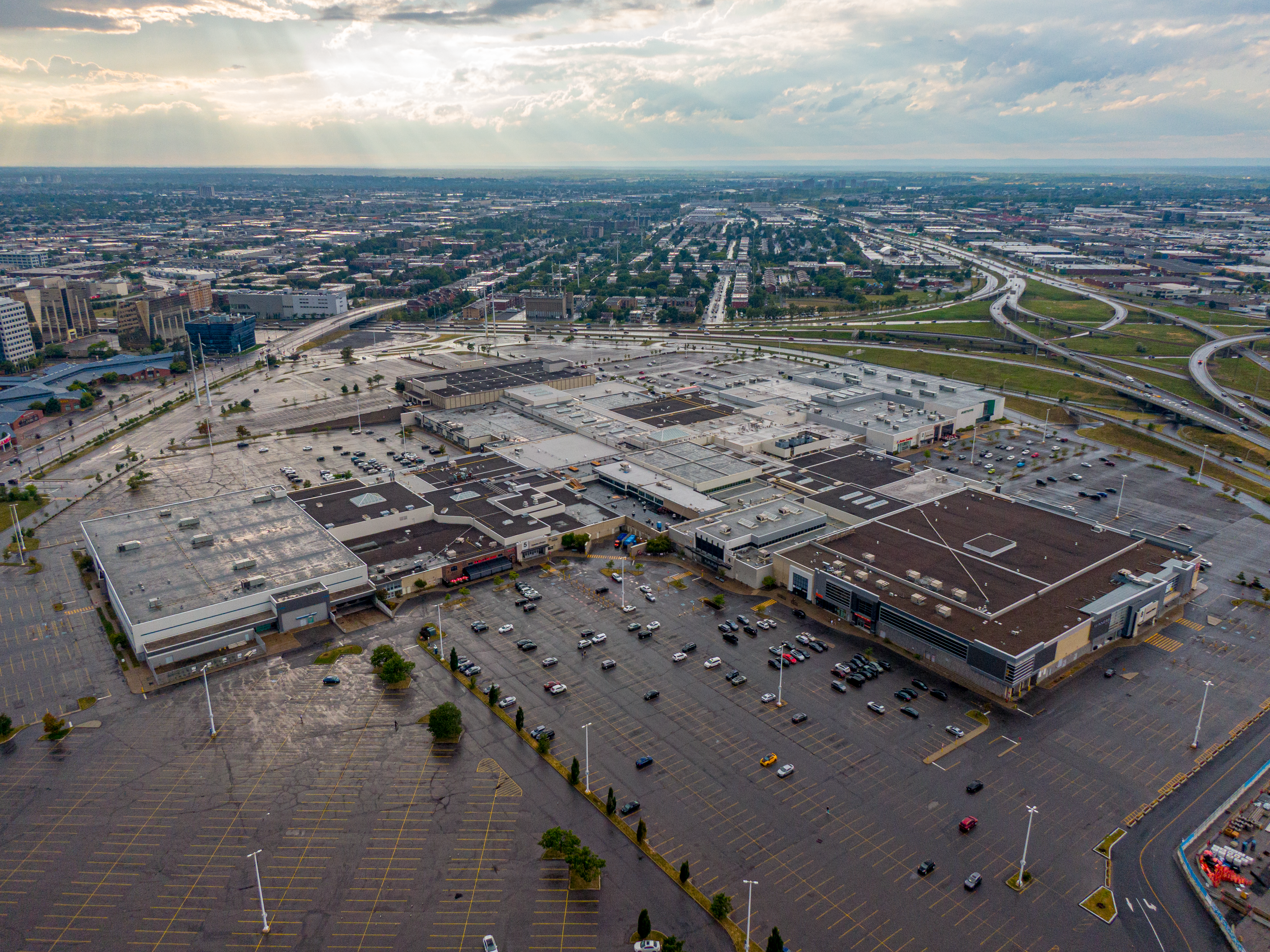
- Galeries d'Anjou in 2025
- Location: Montreal, Quebec
- Address: 7999 Galeries d'Anjou Blvd, Anjou, Quebec, Canada
- Opened: August 8, 1968
- Developer: Fairview Corporation
- Manager: JLL
- Owner: Ivanhoé Cambridge
- Num. of stores: 160
- Num. of anchor tenants: 6
- Floor area: 1,114,000 sq ft (103,500 m^{2}).
- Floors: 1
- Parking: 6000
- Public transit: STM bus 44, 95, 141 and 460; Société de transport de Laval
- Website: galeriesdanjou.com

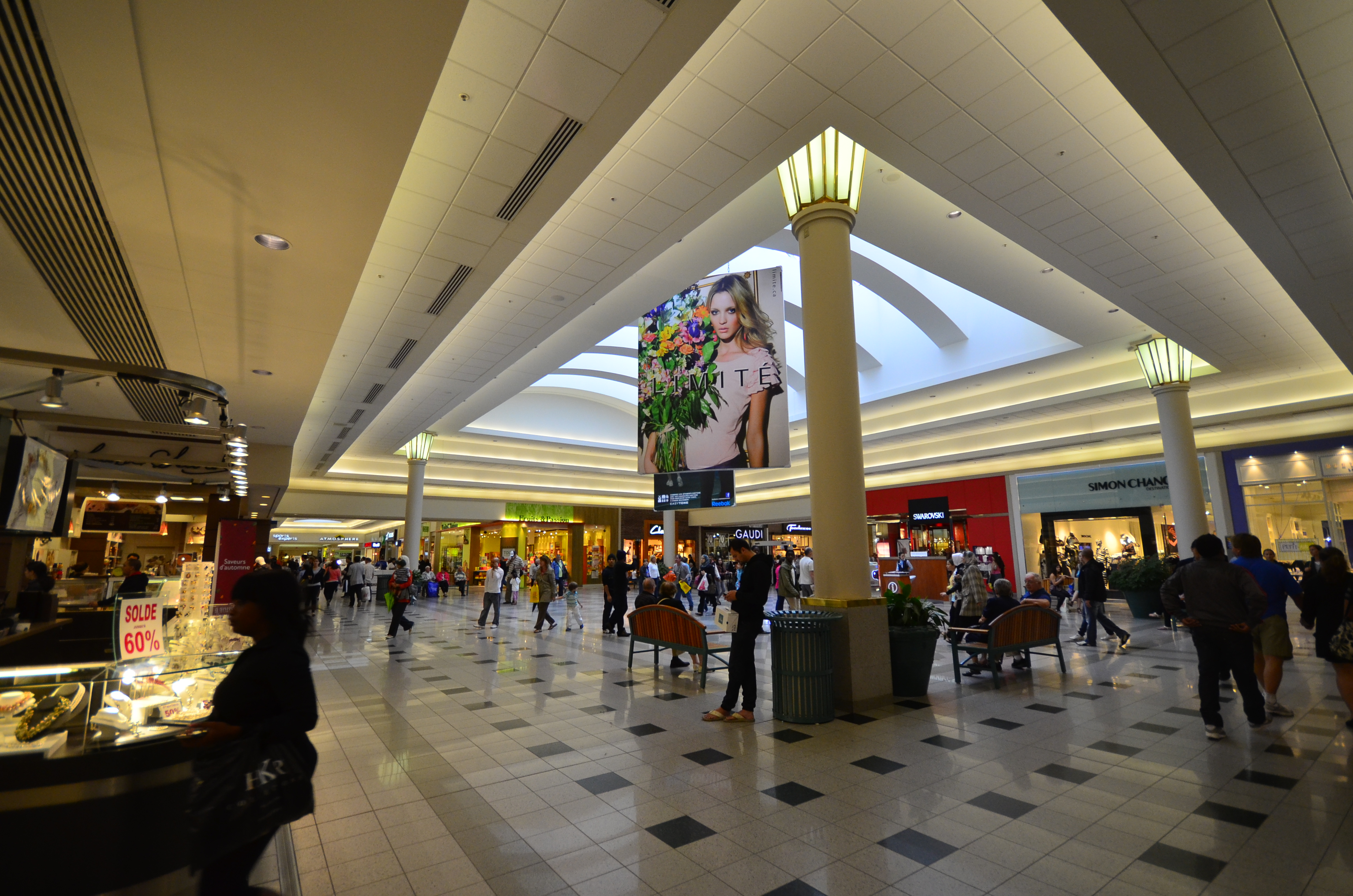
Mall interior in 2011

Galeries d'Anjou (formerly CF Galeries d'Anjou) is a shopping mall located in the borough of Anjou in Montreal, Quebec, Canada. Major tenants include Simons, The Brick, Best Buy, Winners, Sports Experts/Atmosphere and Aubainerie.

Formerly owned by Cadillac Fairview, the mall had long been associated with the company's other shopping centres in the area Fairview Pointe-Claire, Carrefour Laval and Promenades Saint-Bruno. It is now wholly owned by Ivanhoé Cambridge and operated by JLL. It is one of two super-regional malls in eastern Montreal, along with Place Versailles. Galeries d'Anjou is over 1,100,000 sq ft (100,000 m^{2}) and was by far the largest shopping mall on the Island of Montreal throughout the 1970s and much of the 1980s.

== History ==
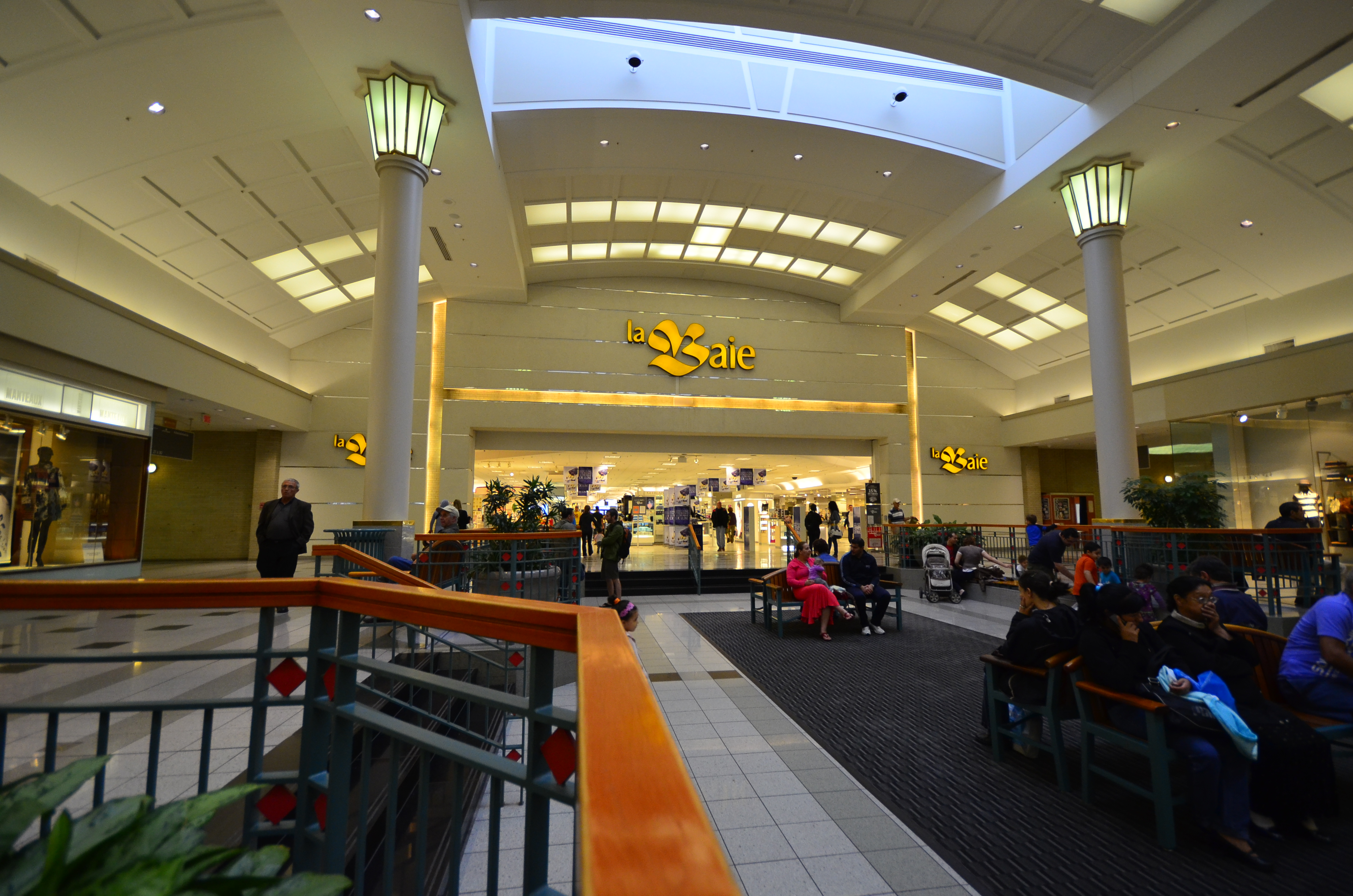
The Bay prior to being renamed Hudson's Bay

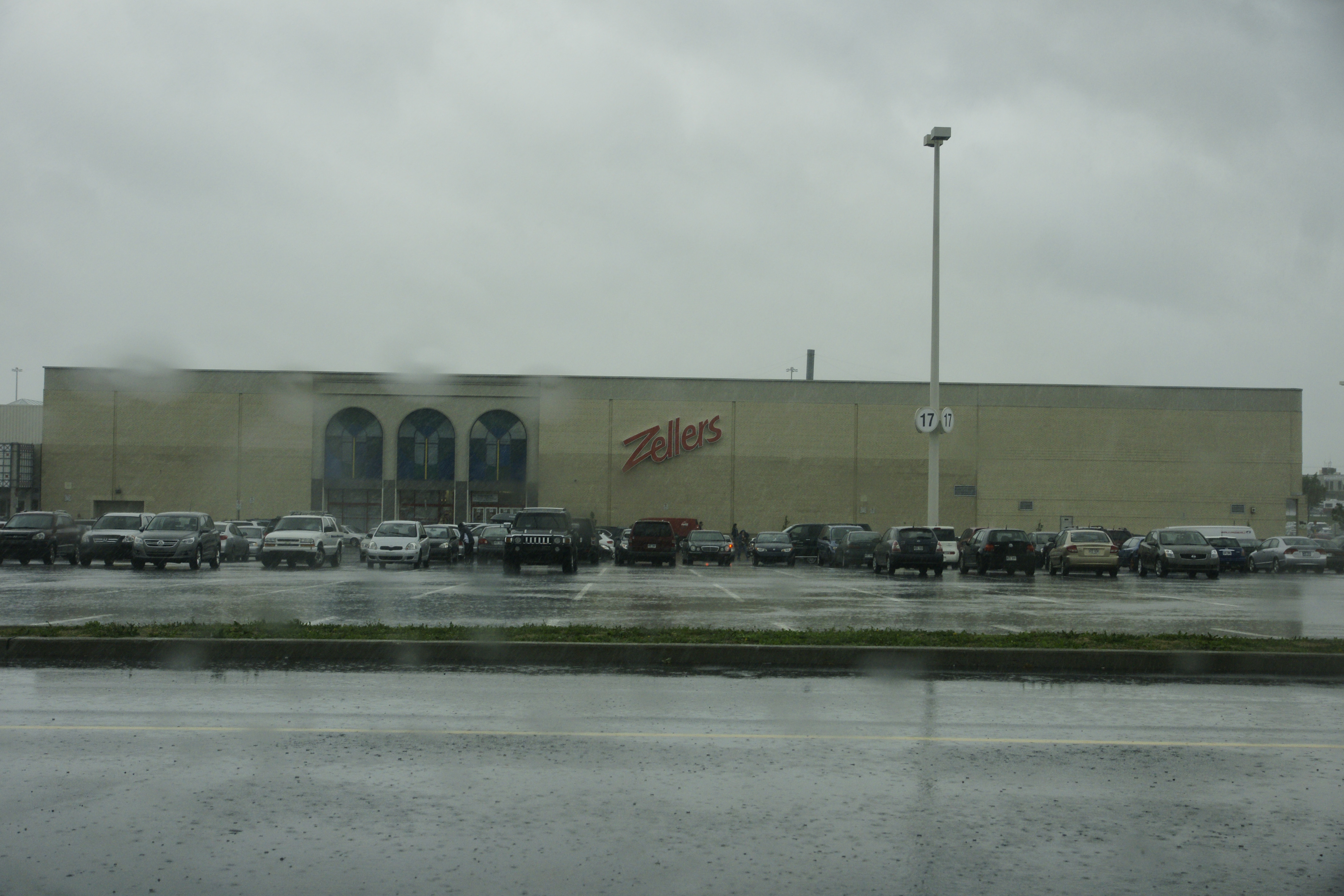
Former Zellers store which had kept Eaton's facade.

In 1967, the part of Radisson Street in Anjou was renamed Galeries d'Anjou Boulevard in honor of the upcoming shopping mall. Construction of the shopping mall began in the spring of 1967 and it was completed in May 1968 as planned. However, further work needed to be done indoors before the mall could be opened to the public.

Galeries d'Anjou inaugurated on August 8, 1968 with 85 stores. Its original anchors were the department stores Simpsons and Eaton's, and the supermarkets Steinberg's and Dominion. As with Fairview Pointe-Claire, Simpsons and Eaton's were located at the extremities of the mall. Simpsons always had three levels but only its first and second floors were used to sell merchandise (its basement was at the time reserved for store services and an employees' cafeteria); at 180,000 square feet, it was Galeries d'Anjou's largest store. Eaton's had two floors and, unlike its other Montreal stores at the time, used the French name Eaton (without the "'s") for its location at Galeries d'Anjou. Both Simpson's and Eaton's had a restaurant inside their store. Steinberg's and Dominion faced each another in the north side of the mall and were separated from one another by a corridor. Upon its opening, Galeries d'Anjou was the second largest shopping mall in Canada after Yorkdale in Toronto. The mall was the joint property of Simpsons Limited and Cemp Investments. It is the second shopping centre in the Montreal area developed and owned by the duo of Simpsons and Cemp Investments.

In 1975, then manager and co-owner Cadillac Fairview announced the expansion of Galeries d'Anjou to bring the total size of the shopping centre from 700,000 sq ft (65,000 m^{2}) to 920,000 sq ft (85,000 m^{2}). As a result, 65 new stores opened on March 25, 1976, in a new mall wing. This new section was anchored a few months later by Sears which inaugurated on August 18, 1976.

In 1979, Hudson's Bay Company acquired the Simpsons chain which it kept as a subsidiary. In 1984, Hudson's Bay Company transferred to its real-estate unit Markborough Properties the shopping malls that were owned by Simpsons. Galeries d'Anjou was therefore the joint property of Cadillac Fairview and Markborough. Simpsons continued operating its store in the mall until it converted to The Bay in March 1989. The store's basement once served in the early 1990s as a warehouse for The Bay's bargains in Montreal, specifically on household products such as large appliances and home furnishings.

Dominion rebranded as Provigo on June 29, 1981. Based on past telephone directories, the Provigo at Galeries d'Anjou lasted until 1989-1990. Ironically, the Steinberg's store in the mall was later rebranded as a Provigo for a brief time in 1992 before being converted into a Maxi supermarket that same year.

Galeries d'Anjou underwent through a $18-million renovation in 1993. The shopping centre did not increase in size this time, but it added 30 new retail stores, a new food court in addition to making a series of interior upgrades to rejuvenate the 25-year-old mall that had become outdated and was losing young customers to rival Place Versailles.

In 1997, Cambridge Shopping Centres absorbed Markborough along with its ownership in shopping malls like Galeries d'Anjou. Cambridge later merged with Ivanhoe Corporation in 2001 to form Ivanhoé Cambridge.

Eaton's went out of business in 1999. Hudson's Bay Company acquired its first floor for a new Zellers store that opened in Spring 2000. The second floor was taken over by The Brick four years later on April 14, 2004.

In August 2013, Galeries d'Anjou introduced a new section of 150,000 sq ft (14,000 m^{2}) featuring Simons and some 15 other retailers. Simons itself was built on the mall's parking lot, while the small tenants took the site of the former food court whose building was torn down to accommodate the expansion. The food court was relocated on the other side of the shopping centre near Zellers (later Target).

Target acquired the lease of Zellers at Galeries d'Anjou, allowing it to open its own store on October 18, 2013. After Target closed all its stores in Canada in April 2015, its space at Galeries d'Anjou was left vacant for two years. Winners, Saks Off 5th and Old Navy opened in 2017 in the former Target location. Saks and Winners both opened on August 3, 2017, whereas Old Navy arrived two months later in October. In spite of these major arrivals, a small space of the former Target store was still unoccupied. It has since been filled by a Cacao 70 chocolatier shop and a Copper Branch restaurant, both of which are accessible only from outside. Moreover, a Dollarama opened up on the second floor and appears to have taken the space of a downsizing Brick.

The Sears at Galeries d'Anjou was among the stores that closed during the chain's final day in Canada on January 14, 2018. The Aubainerie store opened at the former Sears on November 2, 2022.

On May 19, 2021, Ivanhoé Cambridge became the sole owner of the mall by acquiring Cadillac Fairview's share of Galeries d'Anjou in exchange for Ivanhoé Cambridge's share of Fairview Pointe-Claire. Prior to this, the two shopping centres were co-owned by Ivanhoé Cambridge and Cadillac Fairview, with the latter serving as manager of both malls.

== Public transit access ==
Société de transport de Montréal
No.	Route
44	Armand-Bombardier
95	Bélanger
141	Jean-Talon Est
372 ☾	Jean-Talon
460	Express Métropolitaine
Société de transport de Laval
No.	Route
925	Saint-Francois - Metro Radisson

It is expected that with the Blue line extension into Anjou the future metro station will connect underground to the mall through a pedestrian tunnel. On February 16, 2023, it was announced that Ivanhoé Cambridge and the STM, owners of the Montreal metro, have agreed to the construction of the brand new Anjou terminus station of the Blue Line to take place right near the mall. Expropriation of the affected mall space by the STM is expected to occur in March 2024, which would give time to the affected businesses to relocate elsewhere while the new station is being constructed. The station is projected to open in 2029.

== See also ==
- List of largest enclosed shopping malls in Canada
- List of malls in Montreal
- List of shopping malls in Canada
