= Saint-Urbain Street =

Thoroughfare in Montreal, Canada

Coordinates: 45°30′33″N 73°33′56″W

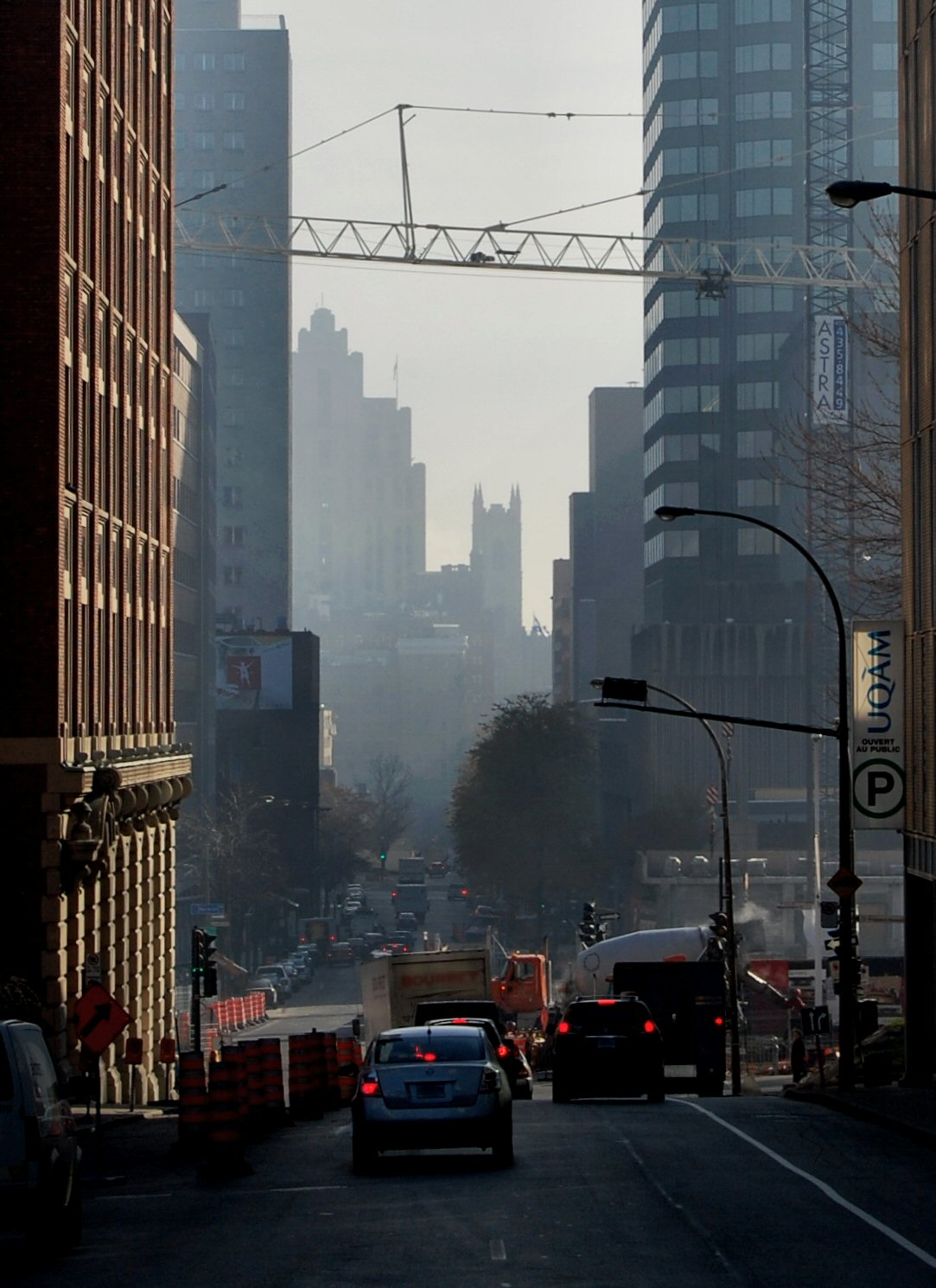
- Saint-Urbain Street in Downtown Montreal.
- Interactive map of Saint-Urbain Street
- Native name: rue Saint-Urbain (French)
- Location: Montreal
- South end: Saint-Antoine Street, Old Montreal
- Major junctions: R-138 Sherbrooke Street
- North end: Gouin Boulevard, Ahuntsic

Construction
- Inauguration: 1817

Saint-Urbain Street (French: rue Saint-Urbain) is a major one-way street located in Montreal, Quebec, Canada. The original, southernmost section of the street was built by Urbain Tessier (c. 1624–1689), a farmer and carpenter who settled in the area. The name also makes reference to Saint Urbain.

In the late 18th and early 19th centuries, the street, now stretching northward, was home to several of Montreal's prominent British and French merchants, notably the explorer Alexander Henry the elder. By the turn of the 20th century, sections of the street were industrialised and became run down, and were settled by Jews, predominantly from Eastern Europe. Writer Mordecai Richler immortalised the Mile End section as a centre of the Jewish community in Montreal, and he documented the life there in novels such as St. Urbain's Horseman.

From roughly 1970 onwards, the Jewish community uprooted to Outremont and the street was settled by Greek, Portuguese and Caribbean immigrants. Today, much of the street has been gentrified.

The street is served by three Montreal Metro stations. At the street's south end, Place-d'Armes station (Orange Line) serves Old Montreal, and Place-des-Arts station (Green Line) serves the Quartier des Spectacles. The De Castelnau station of the Blue Line is located further north along the street, in the Villeray neighbourhood.

It traverses the boroughs of Ville-Marie, Le Plateau-Mont-Royal, Rosemont–La Petite-Patrie, Villeray–Saint-Michel–Parc-Extension and Ahuntsic-Cartierville.

== Points of interest ==
- Church of St. Michael and St. Anthony
- Beauty's Luncheonette
- Baron Byng High School (now Sun Youth)
- Hôtel-Dieu de Montréal
- Université du Québec à Montréal - Pavillon des sciences biologiques
- Church of St. John the Evangelist
- Montreal Symphony House
- Théâtre Maisonneuve
- Théâtre du Nouveau Monde
- Complexe Desjardins
- Complexe Guy-Favreau
- Palais des congrès de Montréal

== See also ==
- Mile End
- Le Plateau-Mont-Royal
- Milton Park, Montreal
- Historic Jewish Quarter/Chinatown, Montreal
