= Robillard Block =

Building in Montreal, Quebec, Canada

Coordinates: 45.5075°N 73.5591°W

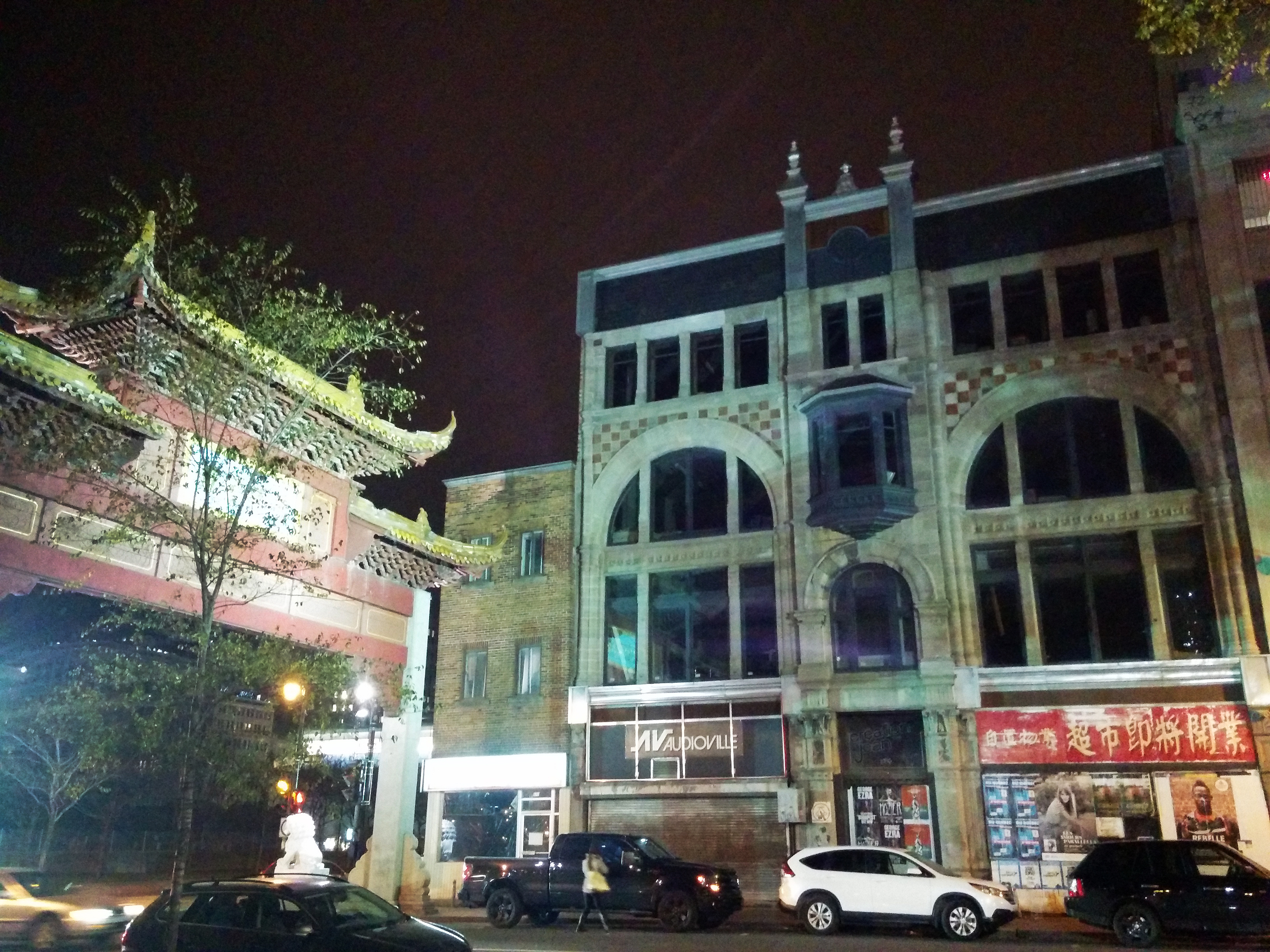
Édifice Robillard in 2014

The Robillard Building (French: Édifice Robillard) once located at 974, boulevard Saint Laurent (974, Saint Laurent Boulevard), was a landmark building in Montreal, Quebec, Canada, situated in Montreal's Chinatown on the corner of rue Viger (Viger Street) and boulevard Saint Laurent (Saint Laurent Boulevard). On 17 November 2016, the building was destroyed by fire. Despite being a famous landmark, the Robillard Building did not have a heritage status and was not rebuilt. The site remained empty from 2016 until 2022. As of 2022, a condominium is being built on the site.

== History ==
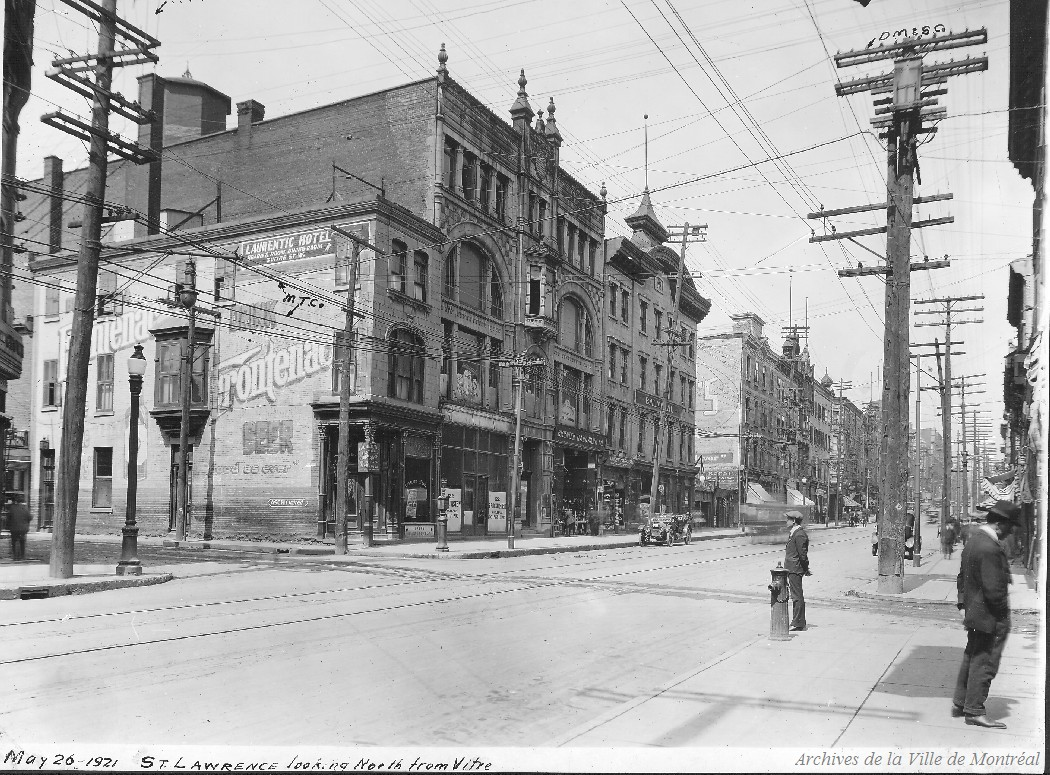
Édifice Robillard in 1921

Constructed in the Neo-Renaissance style, the structure was built in 1879, and transformed into a hotel in 1890. In 1891, it housed the Gaiety Museum and Theatorium, a popular Victorian-era curios showcase. In May 1896, it started housing the Palace Theatre, and on June 27 showed the first movies in North America, making it the first cinema in North America. The cinema system used a projector system developed by the Lumiere brothers, the cinématographe, and had a screen the size of a towel. The first films shown were of a train, a ship, a cavalry charge, and demolishing a wall. The show continued for two months, and were presented by Louis Minier and his assistant Louis Pupier. In September 1896, continuous showings with the cinematographe lumiere started.
