= Montreal Jewish Museum =

Museum in Montreal, Quebec, Canada

Coordinates: 45.5178°N 73.5807°W

- Location within Montreal
- Former name: Interactive Museum of Jewish Montreal (IMJM), the Museum of Jewish Montreal
- Established: 2010
- Type: History museum
- Director: Zev Moses
- Website: museejuifmontreal.ca

The Montreal Jewish Museum (MJM) (French: Musée juif de Montréal) is museum that collects, maps, and presents the history and experiences of the Montreal Jewish community through exhibits, walking tours and online projects. It is located in Montreal, Quebec, Canada. It was founded in 2010 by Zev Moses, the museum's current director.

== Activities ==
The Montreal Jewish Museum was founded in 2010 as the Interactive Museum of Jewish Montreal, when Montreal’s Jewish community turned 250 years old. What began as a project to map Montreal’s Jewish history has since expanded to include online exhibits, oral histories, and walking tours.

The MJM website features online exhibits with written descriptions of key institutions, events, places and people in the history of Montreal’s Jewish life. Each exhibit also features archival imagery and links to further research. Exhibits are intended to give users context about how different elements of the Jewish community’s history fit into the history of Montreal, Quebec, Canada and worldwide Jewish life. There are over 125 original exhibits along with various exhibits based on Sara Tauben’s research on historic synagogues in Montreal.

Beginning in 2013, MJM began curating digital exhibitions, including Between These Walls (January 2013), A Geography of Jewish Care (June 2013) and Work Upon Arrival (January 2014). The Museum began to curate pop-up exhibitions in February 2014, with its exhibition on garment workers "Parkley Clothing: 1937." "Sacrée / Profane - Samy Elmaghribi" about a Moroccan Jewish pop singer and cantor was exhibited in winter 2015. MJM also organizes events, including lectures, panel discussions and other public programming.

In 2016, the Museum acquired a physical storefront on 4040, boulevard Saint-Laurent (4040, Saint Laurent Boulevard). They operated on the ground-floor of a former garment industry factory called the Vineberg Building. In May 2020, however, the Museum lost its physical space, but reopened further north on Saint-Laurent in early 2022.

As of 2025, the Museum’s current physical space at 5220 boulevard Saint-Laurent is currently under renovation, and the Museum’s operations have been moved to the H. Fisher & Fils storefront at 4129 Saint-Laurent, a former century-old sewing notions store.

== Third Solitude Series ==
In October 2011, MJM began publishing The Third Solitude Series, a blog featuring in-depth interviews, research, literature, photo essays and personal stories relating to Montreal’s Jewish heritage. The 'Third Solitude' refers to a term sometimes used in academic contexts to the Jewish experience in Canada and in Montreal specifically, between French and English Canada. This name is based on author Hugh MacLennan's famous book about the French versus English divide in Montreal, titled Two Solitudes.

== Stories Project ==
In 2012, MJM inaugurated the Stories Project, an oral history initiative that aims to collect the stories of members of the community with diverse backgrounds and experiences, to share the stories with broader society and to preserve them over the long-term. A web app allowing users to record stories and upload photos was launched in 2015.

== Walking Tours ==
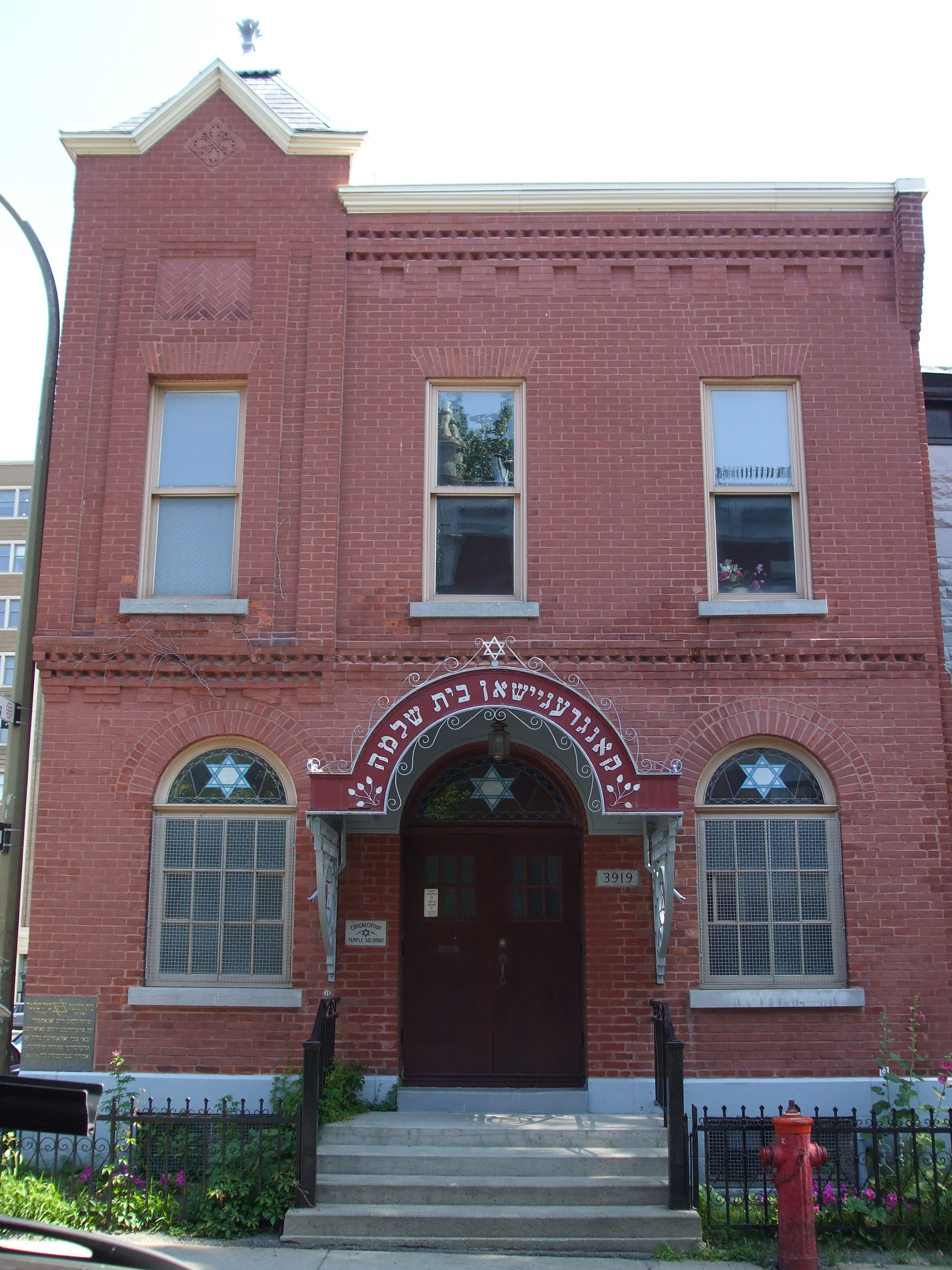
An exterior image of the Bagg Street Shul: a Quebec heritage site and a popular stop on the Museum of Jewish Montréal's walking tours.

In June 2014, MJM began leading daily Jewish walking tours in the Plateau and Mile End neighbourhoods, and in June 2015, the Museum launched the "Beyond the Bagel" Jewish food tours. As of 2026, the museum offers 5 different walking tours, each about a different facet of Jewish life. Making Their Mark, Rabbis, Writers, and Radicals, and In the Shadow of the Mountain are the Museum's 3 historical tours. Beyond the Bagel and the Kosher Food Tour are the Museum's 2 historical food tours.

== See also ==
- Demographics of Montreal
- Saint Laurent Boulevard
- History of the Jews in Canada
- Jewish Museum
- List of museums in Quebec
