= Moishes Steakhouse =

Coordinates: 45.5166°N 73.5782°W

Moishe's Steakhouse
- Interactive map of Moishe's Steakhouse

Restaurant information
- Established: 1938
- Closed: 2020 (original)
- Previous owner: Moishe Lighter
- Location: Montreal, Quebec, Canada

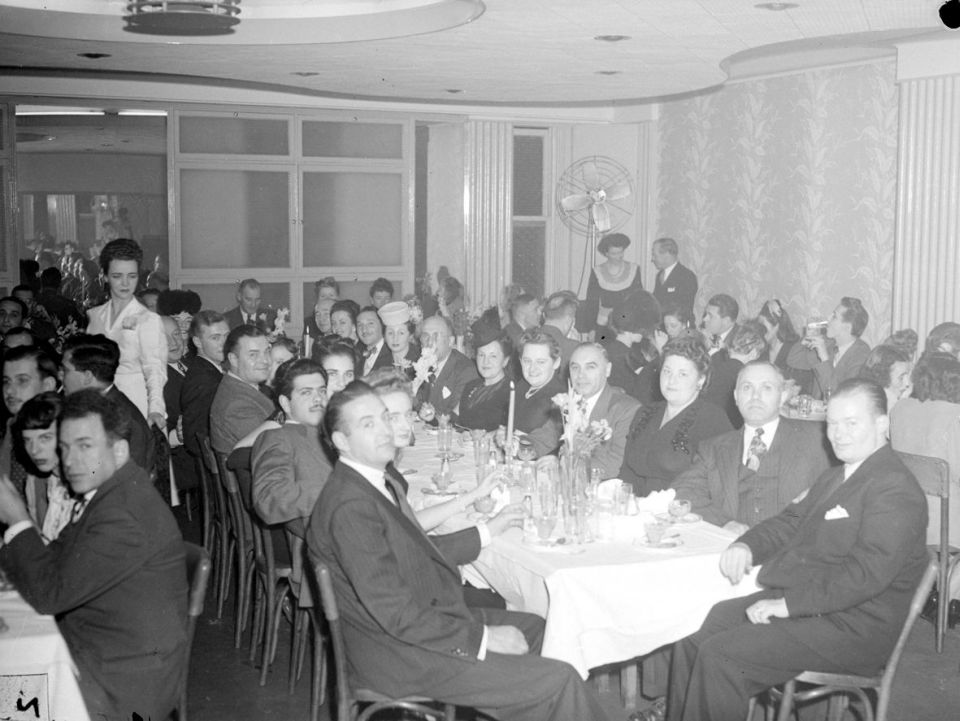
Reception held at Moishe's Restaurant, 1946

Moishe's Steakhouse, in its original incarnation, was one of the oldest restaurants in Montreal, Quebec, Canada. Founded in 1938 by Moishe Lighter, it ran in Montreal's The Main district for 83 years. The restaurant had been in its location at 3961 Saint Laurent Boulevard since its founding, in an area that was the historic Jewish quarter.

Identified as a "Jewish steakhouse," its menu was based on traditional Old World recipes, and it catered to the mainly Central European immigrant residents of The Main neighbourhood. The influence of Romanian cuisine has had a significant shaping influence on the culinary culture of Montreal, producing, among other staples, the Montreal-style steak spice, bagels and smoked meat for which the city has become known. The restaurant was a Montreal landmark.

== History ==
The restaurant, initially called "Romanian Paradise", was founded in 1938 by Moishe Lighter, a Romanian immigrant. Legend has it that Lighter became the owner of the restaurant in a card game. The restaurant's name was changed to "Moishe's" at the outset of World War II.

For several decades, the restaurant had been a fixture of Montreal and "The Main" neighbourhood, whose residents were prominent in Montreal literature and culture, as most famously represented in the writing of Montreal's Mordecai Richler. (Richler himself was a long-time Moishe's client, and the restaurant had featured prominently in much of his work.)

In 2018 Moishe's was sold to the Sportscene Group, owner of La Cage aux Sports sportsbar chain. Sportscene also acquired all Moishe's trademarks, branding and the line of products sold at grocery stores. Following the change in ownership, the restaurant remained branded as Moishe's and at its location at 3961 St-Laurent. Plans were made to transition to a new location while retaining staff and without closing down, but would later fall through.

In March 2020, the steakhouse closed its doors due to the COVID-19 pandemic lockdown. During this period, the building's owner changed and the lease on the Saint-Laurent boulevard location was expiring at the end of the year. When the lockdown was lifted 3 months later, the restaurant would not reopen, ending 83 years of continuous operation.

== Reception and awards ==
The restaurant won a Wine Spectator Award of Excellence in 2011, and was named by Forbes magazine as one of the Top 10 Steakhouses in the World.

== Notable clientele ==
Over the decades, Moishe's became a draw for Montrealers of all backgrounds and walks of life. In addition to "regular" Montrealers, it has been frequented by a long list of celebrities, politicians and athletes such as Penélope Cruz, Robert De Niro, Céline Dion, Paul Newman, Sharon Stone, Robert Downey Jr. and Don Rickles. Karol Wojtyla, who would later become Pope John Paul II, ate there while still a Cardinal. It was Leonard Cohen's favourite restaurant, and his family held a wake for him there.

== New restaurant ==
A plan to relocate was made as part of Moishe's purchase, however was delayed long after the original restaurant had closed and ceased operation. A new location in the downtown-Square Victoria area was chosen–the Viger Avenue site on Caisse-de-Dépôts-et-Placements block, where the former Houston's Restaurant had been. Renovations to the site started in August 2020. It was planned to open in fall 2022 but was again delayed. In May 2023 new staff from the ground up was hired and the iconic "Moishes" sign was put up at 1001 Square Victoria Street.

In June 2023, the new restaurant, no longer in the Main neighbourhood, opened at 1001 Square Victoria Street in the downtown Montreal International District. Despite retaining the former restaurant's name, it featured a redesigned menu, modified recipes, an entirely new staff and team of chefs, as well as differing interior style with all new amenities and ambience. Essentially a new operation from the ground up, many consider it a re-imagined version of Moishe's with few, if any, ties to the original.

== See also ==
- List of Ashkenazi Jewish restaurants
