= Théâtre Espace Go =

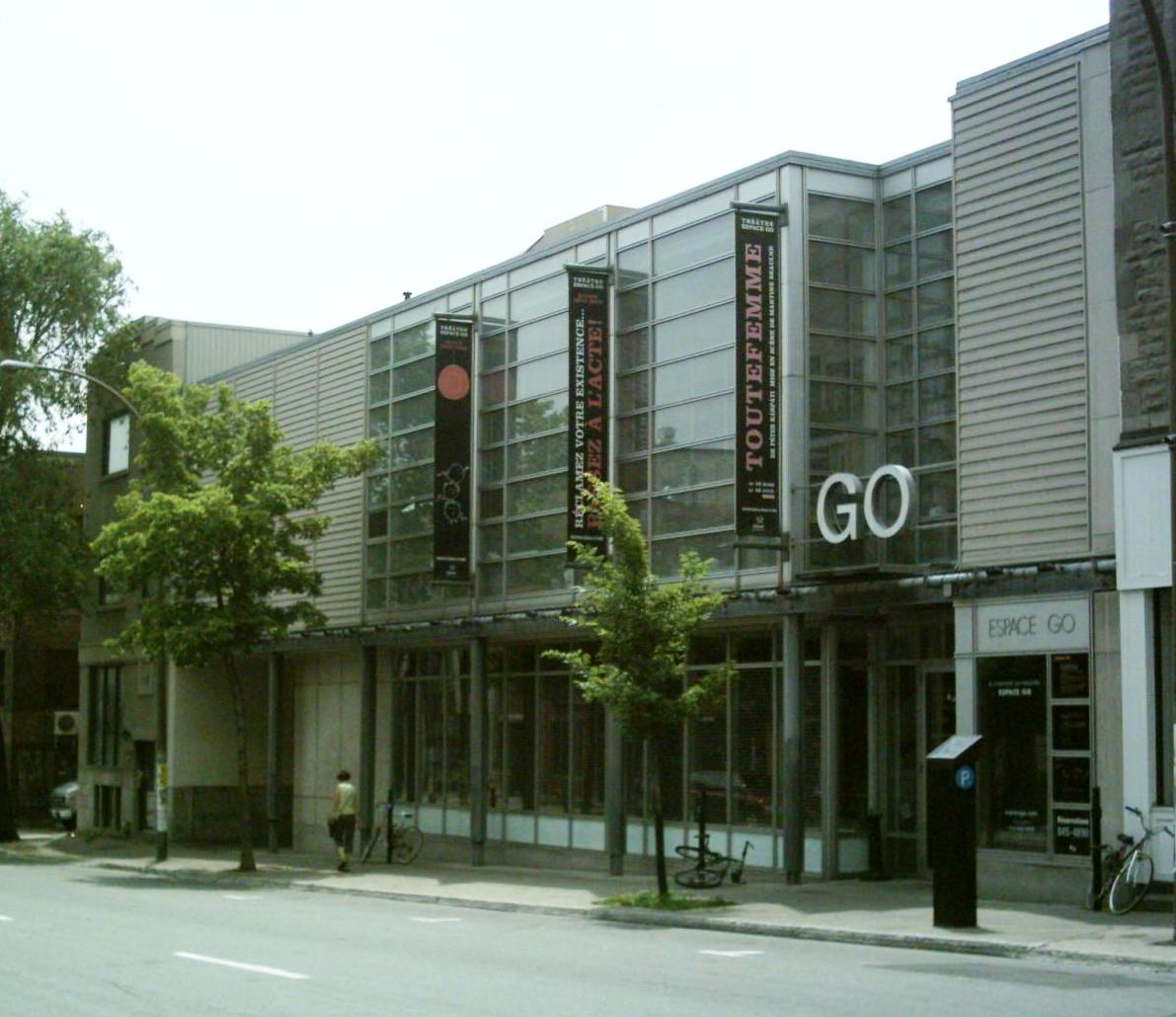
- Espace Go on Saint Laurent Blvd.
- Interactive map of Théâtre Espace Go
- Address: 4890 Saint Laurent Boulevard; Montreal; Quebec, Canada
- Coordinates: 45.5220°N 73.5909°W
- Capacity: 160-280
- Type: Women's theatre

Construction
- Opened: 1995
- Architect: Éric Gauthier

Website
- www.espacego.com

Théâtre Espace Go (commonly known as Espace Go, French for "Go Space") is a theatre in Montreal, Quebec, Canada. Founded in 1985 as the feminist Théâtre Expérimental des Femmes, the company changed its name to Théâtre Espace Go in 1994 and broadened its mandate.

In 1988, it received the Grand Prix from the Conseil des arts de Montréal for its contributions to the city's culture. In 1991, it was honoured with a special prize from the Association Québécoise des Critiques de Théâtre.

In 1995, Espace Go moved to a new $5,000,000 complex on Saint Laurent Boulevard. Architect Éric Gauthier received the Prix d'Excellence from the Ordre des architectes du Québec for the building, which was formally inaugurated on March 9, 1995. The initial production in the new space was Philippe Minyana's Inventaires, directed by Louise Laprade, who was one of the co-founders of the Théâtre Expérimental des Femmes.

Espace Go serves as a home for several Montreal theatre companies, including Théâtre PÀP and Théâtre I.N.K.
