= Saint Laurent Boulevard =

Street in Montreal, Quebec, Canada

Coordinates: 45°30′37″N 73°33′52″W

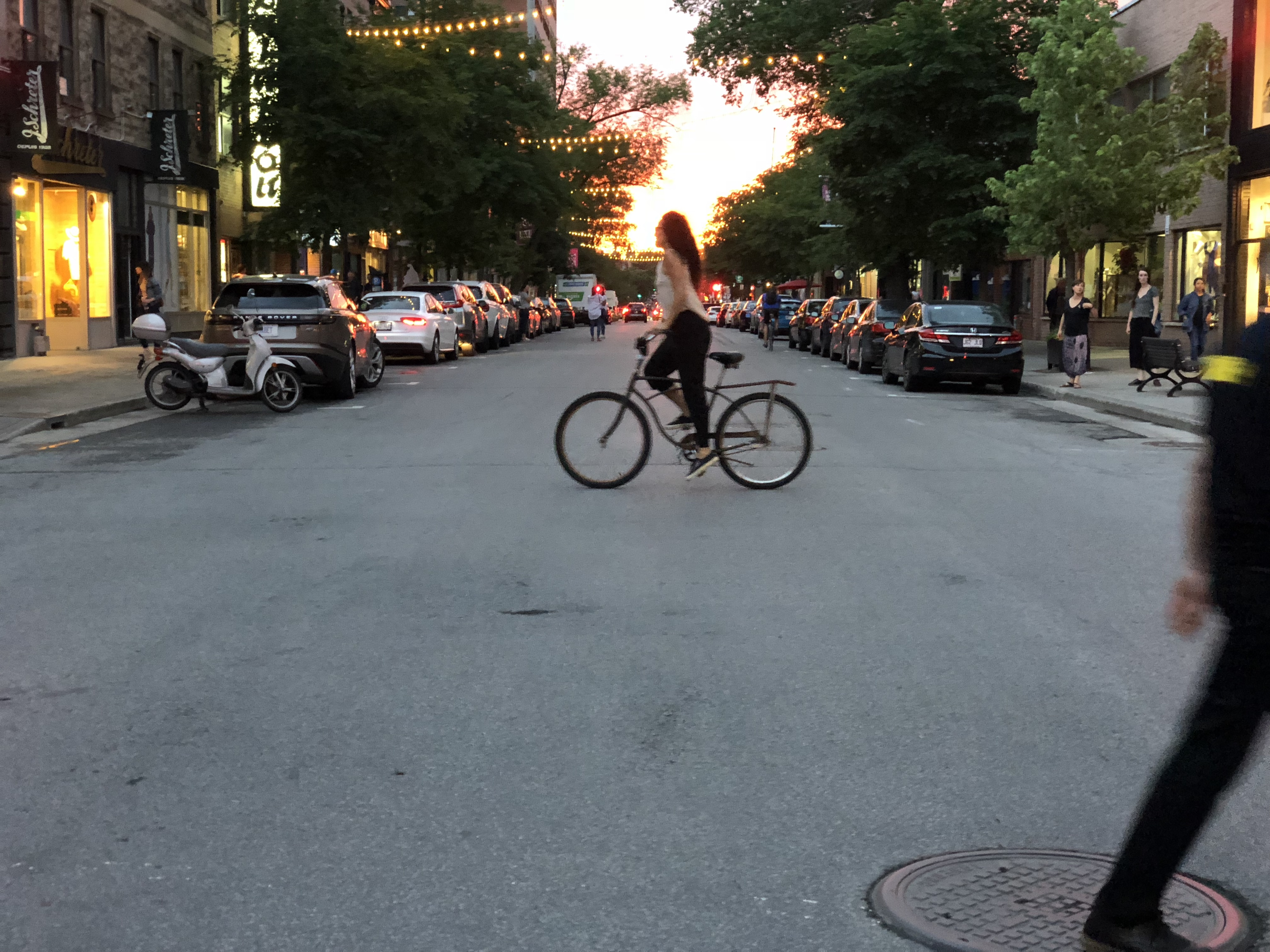
- Saint Laurent Boulevard at sunset on summer solstice.
- Interactive map of Saint Laurent Boulevard
- Native name: boulevard Saint-Laurent (French)
- Former name: Chemin Saint-Lambert
- Length: 11 km (6.8 mi)
- Location: Montreal
- South end: De la Commune Street, Old Montreal
- Major junctions: A-40 (TCH); R-138
- North end: Somerville Street, Ahuntsic

Construction
- Inauguration: 1720

Saint Laurent Boulevard, also known as Saint Lawrence Boulevard (officially in French: boulevard Saint-Laurent), is a major street in Montreal, Quebec, Canada. A commercial artery and cultural heritage site, the street runs north west–south east through the near-centre of city and is nicknamed The Main (French: La Main), which is the abbreviation for "Main Street".

== The Main ==
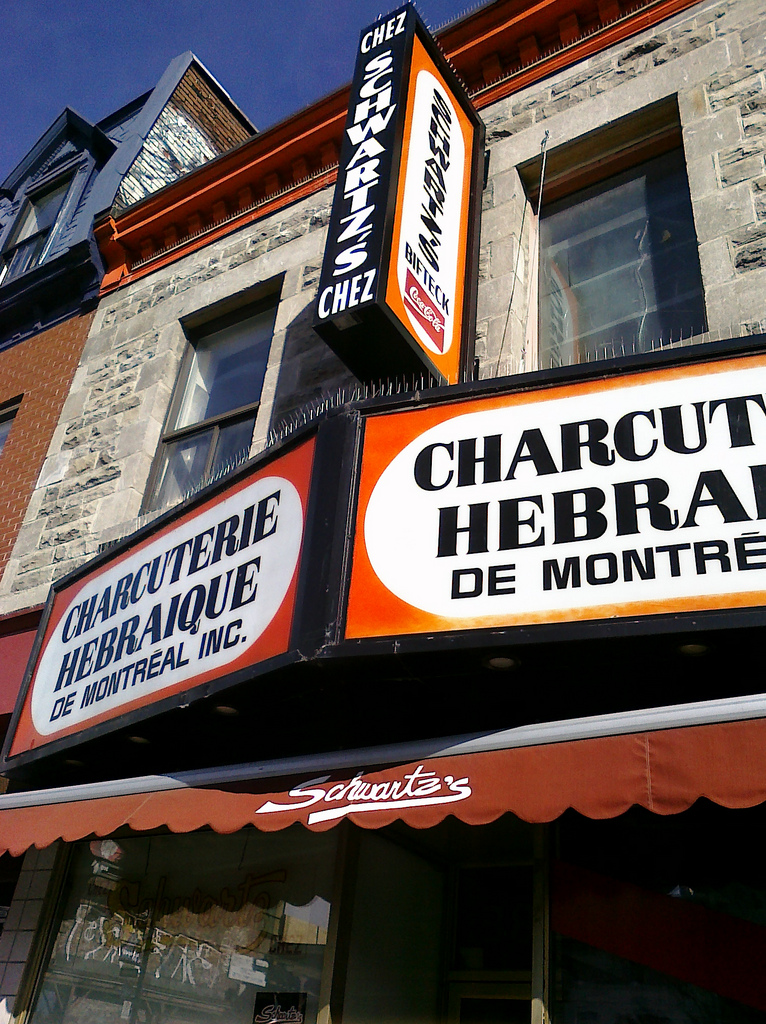
Schwartz's Delicatessen

Beginning at De la Commune Street at the edge of the Saint Lawrence River, it transects the Island of Montreal, passing through the boroughs of Ville-Marie, Le Plateau-Mont-Royal, Rosemont—La Petite-Patrie, Villeray–Saint-Michel–Parc-Extension, and Ahuntsic-Cartierville to Rue Somerville at the edge of the Rivière des Prairies – a total length of about 11.25 km (6.99 mi).

Saint Laurent Boulevard's cardinal direction, on a pseudo north–south axis strongly shifted to the west and aligned with the summer solstice's setting sun, was outlined by the Sulpicians towards the end of the 17th century. The first post-colonial landowners of the island, then preoccupied to develop a genuine urban cadastre on the Coteau Saint-Louis, built a small street, which they named Saint-Lambert, perpendicularly to Notre-Dame Street. Saint-Lambert Street is clearly identified on a plan drawn by François Dollier de Casson in 1672. In the early 18th century, when the lords of Montreal decided to develop agricultural land further north on the island, they prolonged this little street to build a King's Way exactly along the same axis and named it Chemin Saint-Laurent.

Chemin Saint-Laurent became a boulevard in 1905 and is often referred to as The Main. It serves as the city's physical division of east and west (in Montreal parlance; in reality east is more like north-northeast and west is south-southwest). Street numbers begin at Saint Lawrence and continue outward, with street names being suffixed by Ouest (West) or Est (East), depending on their orientation.

The boulevard traditionally divides Montreal by language, ethnicity, and class. Saint Laurent Boulevard was for generations the symbolic dividing line for the city, with the predominantly English-speaking population to the west, French-speaking population to the east, and immigrant communities in between along the Main and Park Avenue. The Main runs through many of Montreal's ethnic communities, a first stop for immigrant communities for over 100 years – initially Jewish, Chinese and Italian, and later Portuguese, Greek, Arab, Haitian and others.

== National Historic Site ==
In 2002 the Historic Sites and Monuments Board of Canada named Saint Lawrence Boulevard as The Main National Historic Site of Canada. Then Minister of Heritage, Sheila Copps, speaking at the ceremony, said: "our country does not belong to just two founding peoples. It belongs to all Canadians. [This is] a first step toward a new story of Canada that includes all of our partners as equals."

== Historic Jewish Quarter ==
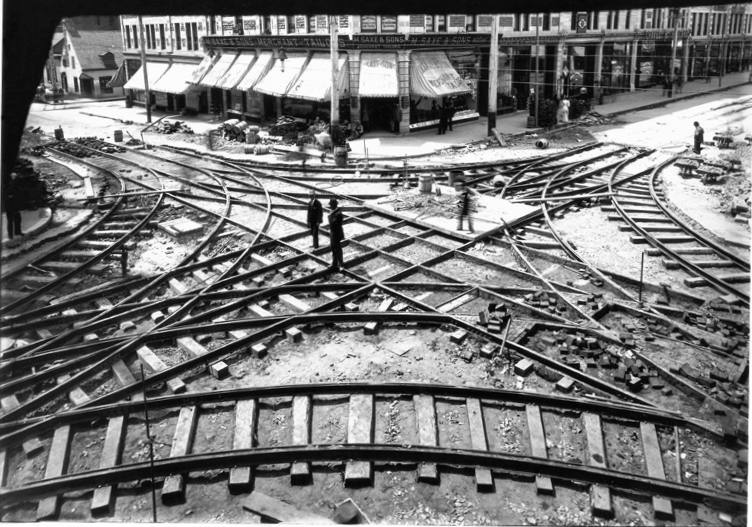
A Grand union tramway crossing under construction in Montreal at Sainte Catherine and Saint Lawrence Street in 1893.

All day long, St. Lawrence Boulevard, or Main Street, is a frenzy of poor Jews, who gather there to buy groceries, furniture, clothing and meat. Most walls are plastered with fraying election bills, in Yiddish, French and English. The street reeks of garlic and quarrels and bill collectors: orange crates, stuffed full with garbage and decaying fruit, are piled slipshod in most alleys. Swift children gobble pilfered plums; slower cats prowl the fish market.

— Mordecai Richler, Son of a Smaller Hero

The Jewish community on the Main sprang up after the heavy immigration of the early to mid-1900s. Jewish settlement occurred first on the lower Main, in a section that now is part of Montreal's Chinatown.

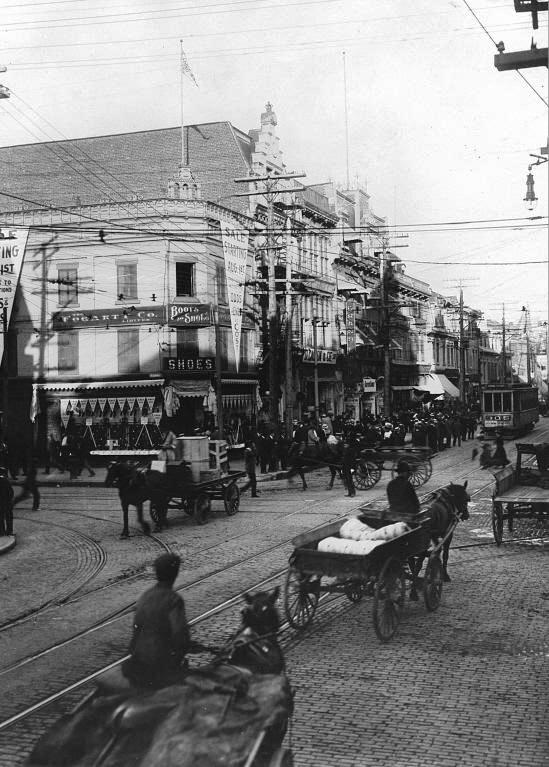
Saint Lawrence and Saint Catherine Streets, 1905.

By 1871 a Jewish enclave numbering just over 400 people had formed by the corner of St. Lawrence and Dorchester Street, with the first Jewish educational institution, the Talmud Torah, located at the corner of Saint Urbain Street and De la Gauchetière Street. Middle-class members of the community were already beginning to move up the Main towards Sherbrooke and Prince Arthur Streets, while further west, a small number of well-off Jews lived near McGill University.

The main axes of the Jewish quarter were Saint Laurent Boulevard, Clark Street, Saint Urbain Street, Esplanade Street and Park Avenue, Montreal. By the 1930s dozens of synagogues were in the area. Culinary landmarks on Saint Laurent that bear witness to this historic community include Schwartz's and Moishes Steakhouse.

Yiddish was the common language in the Jewish district on Saint Laurent Boulevard, with many Jewish immigrants working in clothing factories, once the street's main industry. Overall, Montreal was the main destination for the 125,000 Jews who settled in Canada between 1905 and 1920, making the area a centre of Yiddish language and culture (e.g. theatre in that language). Despite Canada's poor record of Jewish immigration between 1933 and 1948, Montreal became home to the world's third-largest concentration of Holocaust survivors, most of them Yiddish speakers. Other cultural institutions such as the Jewish Public Library operated in more than one language.

=== Culture ===
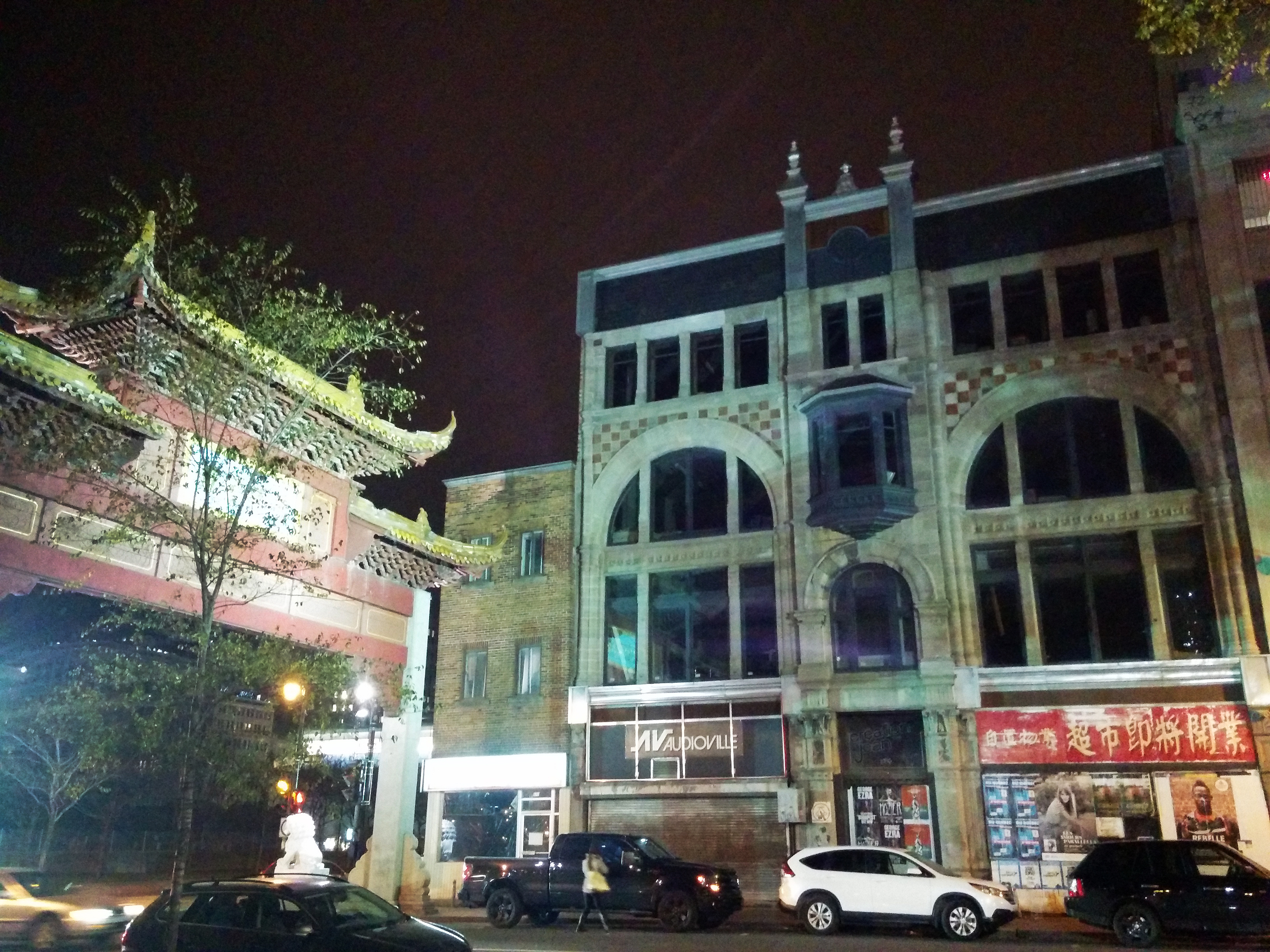
Édifice Robillard seen in 2014, was the first cinema in North America. It burned down in 2016.

Montreal featured the fifth-largest population of Yiddish speakers in the Americas, after New York City, Philadelphia, Chicago, and Buenos Aires; by 1930, 60,000 Yiddish speakers lived on or around The Main. The district was home to the second-largest Yiddish theatre in North America from 1896 to the 1940s, with shows at vaudeville houses along the Main as well as the Monument-National, now a National Historic Site and part of the National Theatre School of Canada.

The Main was also a centre of Jewish publishing. In 1907 a young Polish Jewish immigrant, Hirsch Wolofsky, started the Yiddish-language daily newspaper Keneder Adler (English: Canadian Eagle). The paper was initially published from an office on St. Lawrence near Ontario Street. However, when the Adler became successful, Wolofsky moved the paper to its own building at 4075 St. Lawrence, near Duluth Street. The paper would publish for more than 80 years. Today Wolofsky is remembered with a small park in his honour on Rue Coloniale, between Prince-Arthur and Sherbrooke.

=== Politics ===
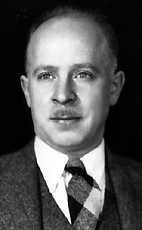
Fred Rose

The poor Jewish quarter had a distinctly left-wing slant. Fred Rose represented the Main's Cartier riding until 1947, when he was expelled from the House of Commons after a controversial conviction on charges of spying for the Soviet Union. To this day the Main remains the only part of Canada ever represented in Parliament by an openly Communist MP.

Area city councillor Joseph Schubert, a Romanian Jew, was a socialist and admirer of Karl Marx. Elected to Montreal City Council in 1924, he was the council's most prominent advocate of worker's rights for 15 years. In 1931, he built a public bathhouse at the corner of Bagg and St. Lawrence, which still stands today as the Schubert Bath (official French name: Bain Schubert).

=== Decline ===
By the 1950s many Jews had moved to other communities, and most synagogues were demolished or converted to other uses. The Bagg Street Shul is the only synagogue still remaining. Former prominent Jewish-run businesses on the street included Ida Steinberg's grocery store, founded in 1917 on St. Lawrence near Mount Royal, which went on to become Steinberg's, Quebec's largest supermarket chain. Another supermarket, Warshaw's, was the subject of controversy when the city of Montreal was forced to pay damages after first approving and then rejecting changes to its iconic storefront. The exterior signage for Warshaw's is on permanent display as part of the Montreal Signs Project at Concordia University's Loyola campus. As of 2003 fewer than 10 Jewish-owned and family-run businesses remained on the Main between Sherbrooke Street and Mount Royal Avenue.

== Neighbourhoods ==
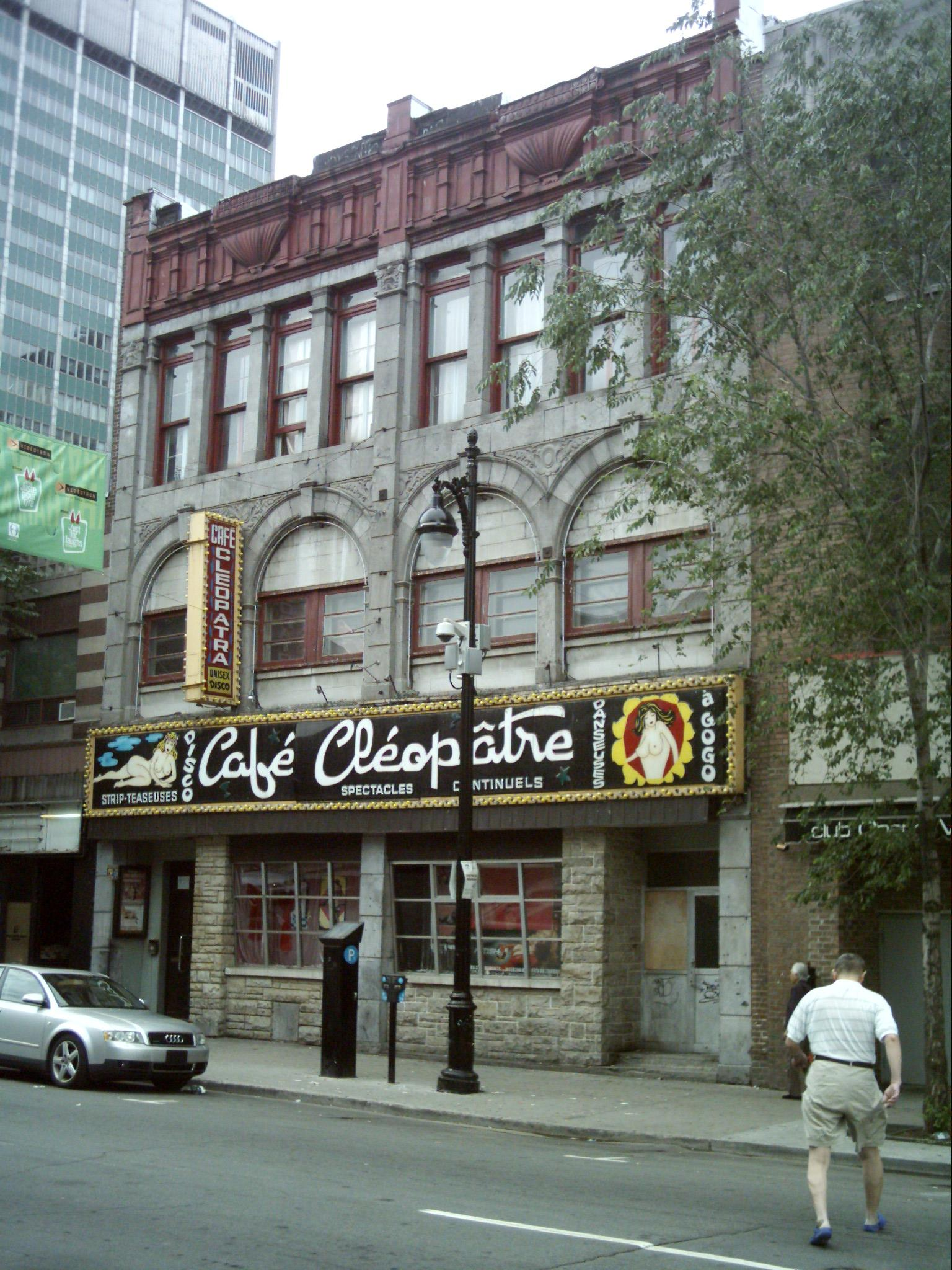
Part of the street's vanishing red-light district.

Today, the stretch of Saint Laurent boulevard is home to, from south to north:

- Old Montreal (from the shores of the St. Lawrence River to Viger Street)
- Montreal's Chinatown (between Viger Street and René Lévesque Boulevard)
- A small red-light district surviving between René Lévesque Boulevard and Saint Catherine Street, in the area of the Monument National
- The Quartier des spectacles (between Saint Catherine and Sherbrooke streets)
- The Main bar district (roughly between Sherbrooke and Duluth streets),
- Montreal's Little Portugal, clustered around Duluth and Rachel Streets
- Mile End between Mount Royal and Van Horne Avenues
- Little Italy between Saint Zotique and Jean-Talon streets
- The eastern edge of Jarry Park beside Jarry Street
- Quartier de la Mode, formerly the centre of Canada's clothing manufacturing, around the corner of Chabanel Street in the Ahuntsic section of the borough of Ahuntsic-Cartierville
- Parc Nicolas-Viel, on the north side of Rue Somerville on the shore of the Rivière des Prairies

Despite the origin of its name, the Boulevard does not enter the borough of Saint-Laurent, which is entirely to its west.

== Famous residents ==
The Main has produced many of Canada's most prolific individuals in the arts and has acted as a memory space. Novelists Mordecai Richler, Réjean Ducharme and Michel Tremblay and poets Irving Layton, A. M. Klein and Leonard Cohen were all influenced by this area. Canada's most prestigious award for fiction, the Scotiabank Giller Prize, was named after journalist Doris Giller, a native to the area.

== Depictions in popular culture ==
Sass Jordan's 1992 hit single "Going Back Again" also depicts Saint Lawrence Boulevard as the dividing line between Montreal's English and French cultures, expressing the hope that "Someday we will come together Lord/Reach across this great divide". Trevanian's 1976 novel The Main is set in the more run-down district of the sixties, before the modern renaissance. Montreal singer Cœur de pirate's 2011 album Blonde includes a song entitled "Saint-Laurent" that refers to the street. Saint Laurent Boulevard is also mentioned in The Blacklist (2013), as the location where Raymond 'Red' Reddington (played by James Spader) takes Agent Elizabeth 'Lizzy' Keen (Megan Boone) to meet his liaison for the next attack, within the second episode of the first season, entitled "The Freelancer".

== Businesses and attractions ==
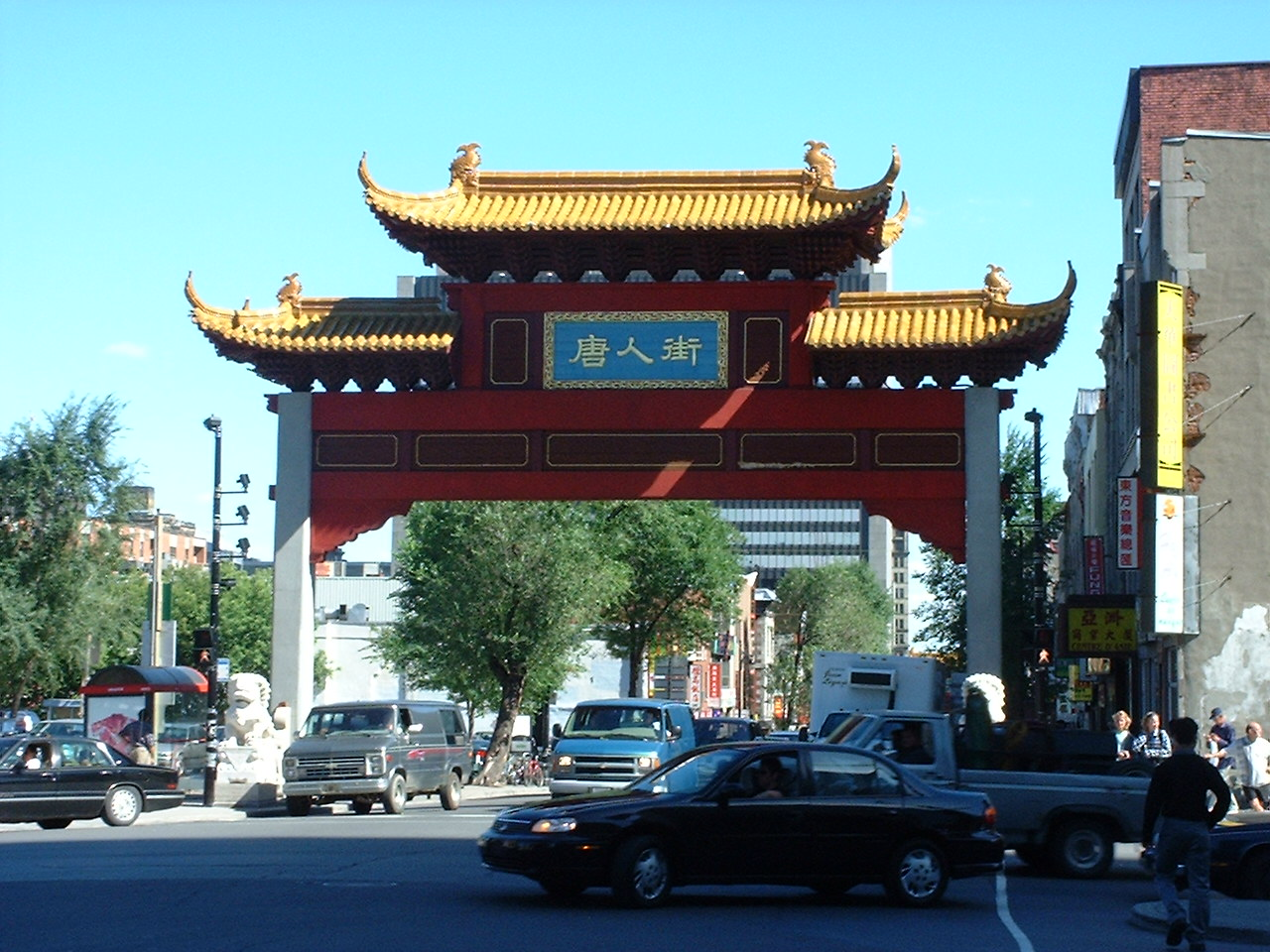
Entrance to Montreal's Chinatown, St. Lawrence at René Lévesque Boulevard.

Numerous art galleries and other cultural organisations make their home on the Main, including La Centrale gallerie Powerhouse, Théâtre Espace Go, the Festival du Nouveau Cinéma, the Festival International Nuits d'Afrique, the Montreal Fringe Festival, Image & Nation Festival, the Society for Arts and Technology, and the Native Friendship Centre of Montreal. Many well-known music venues can also be found on the Main, including Casa del Popolo, Sala Rosa, Club Soda, Barfly, Jupiter Room, Club Lambi, The Academy Club and Divan Orange.

Gastronomic highlights include Schwartz's deli and the nearby Main Deli Steak House, both serving Montreal-style smoked meat, as well as the Montreal Pool Room, serving Montreal hot dogs since 1912.

The first movies in North America were screened at the Édifice Robillard on 27 June 1896, making this venue the first cinema in both Canada and the United-States. The building was destroyed by fire on 17 November 2016. Other noteworthy and now defunct ventures include the original Cinéma Parallèle, Dummies Theatre, Lux, Excentris and Softimage.

In early June, Saint-Laurent Boulevard becomes the host of the MURAL Festival, an international public art event that attracts artists from all over the world. MURAL celebrates creativity in a street context. For the occasion, the street is closed to car traffic between Sherbrooke Street and Mount Royal Avenue. The festival attracts around 800,000 visitors each year and won Montreal's Grand Prize of tourism for its first edition in 2013.

Since 2003, Montreal bike couriers organize an illegal time trial race named Beat the Main where dozen of cyclists dash the entire 11.5 km (7.1 mi) stretch between rue de la Commune and boulevard Gouin, mostly ignoring traffic lights and regulations.

The Société de développement du boulevard Saint-Laurent (SDBSL) is a merchant's association promoting the economic, social and cultural development of Saint-Laurent Boulevard between Sherbrooke Street and Mont-Royal Avenue.

== Transportation ==
Along most of its length, from Rue St-Antoine northward to just south of Rue Jean-Talon, the street is one-way northbound. The northbound leg of the 55 St-Laurent bus route runs along the street, returning south via Rue Clark and Rue St-Urbain.

Saint-Laurent station on the Green Line of the Montreal Metro and De Castelnau station on the Blue Line are situated on Saint Laurent Boulevard. On the Orange Line, Place-d'Armes station is also nearby.

== Redevelopment and construction ==
The corner of Saint Lawrence and Saint Catherine streets is still known as a red-light district, although its days appear numbered as a proposed $167-million development is slated to transform the area, now part of the city's new Quartier des Spectacles. In 2007 and 2008, a section of the street between Sherbrooke street and Mont-Royal avenue underwent extensive construction work, which forced some businesses to close.

== See also ==
- History of Montreal cabarets
