= La Binerie Mont-Royal =

Montreal restaurant

Coordinates: 45.5238°N 73.5833°W

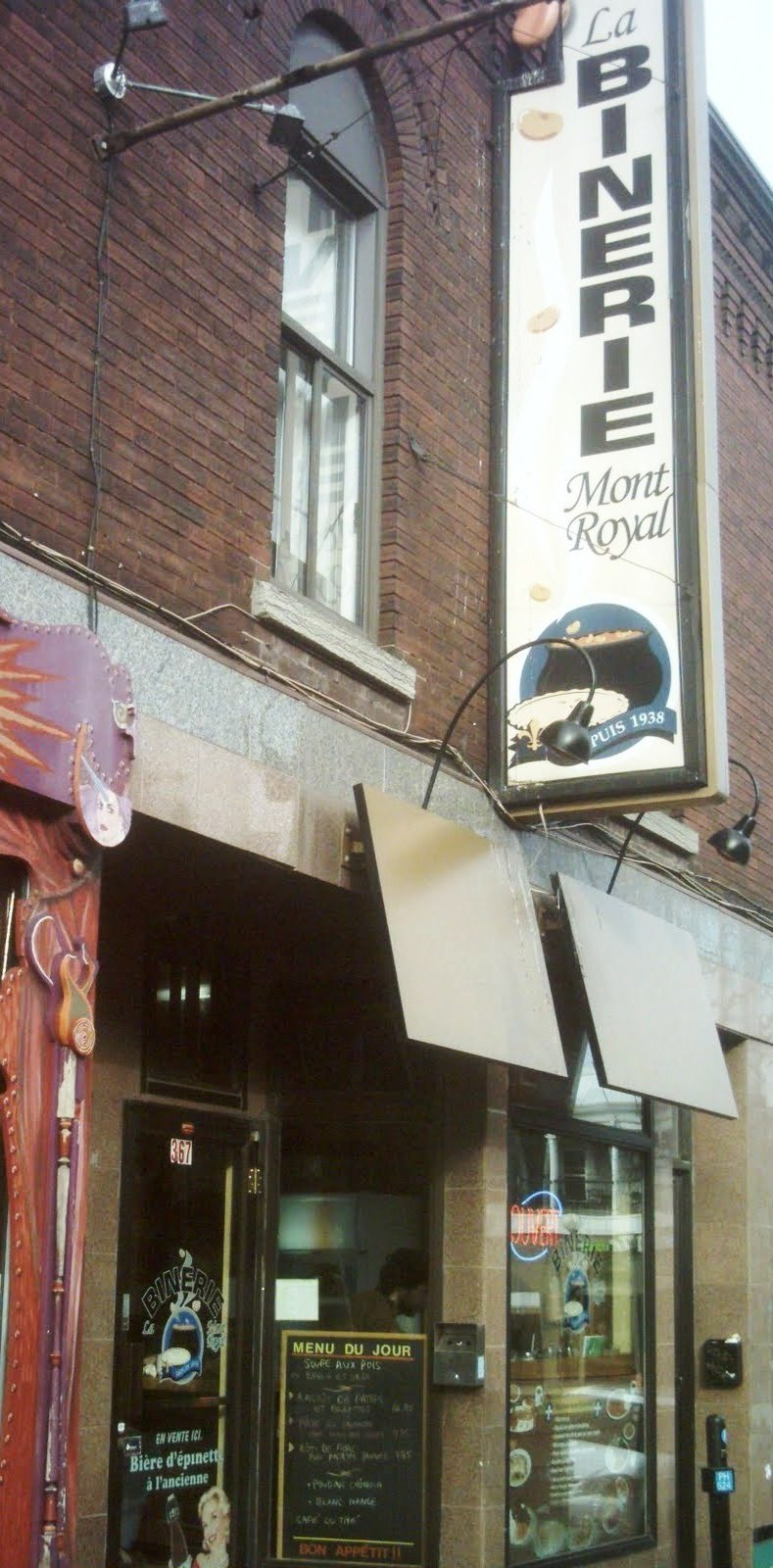
La Binerie Mont-Royal at its original location

La Binerie Mont-Royal is a lunch counter-style restaurant in Montreal, Quebec, Canada, specializing in traditional Quebec cuisine, including its signature baked beans.

Founded in 1938 by Léonide Lussier, the restaurant was the setting of Yves Beauchemin's novel and film The Alley Cat (Le Matou), which was filmed on location. The business was purchased by new owners Jocelyne and Philippe Brunet in 2005, but largely remains unchanged. In addition to its trademark beans, the restaurant serves such traditional fare as tourtières, Pâté chinois, pouding chômeur, pea soup and spruce beer.

The restaurant was located at 367 east, Avenue du Mont-Royal, in the city's Plateau Mont-Royal borough until August 31, 2019. It later reopened in 2019 on Saint-Denis street near Rachel street.
