= Radio-Canada =

Radio-Canada may refer to:

- CBC/Radio-Canada, the Canadian Broadcasting Corporation
- Ici Radio-Canada Télé, the CBC's main French-language television network
- Ici Radio-Canada Première, the CBC's main French-language radio network

== See also ==
- Radio Canada International, the international broadcasting service of the CBC
