= Mount Royal Avenue =

Street in Montreal, Canada

Coordinates: 45°31′27″N 73°34′57″W

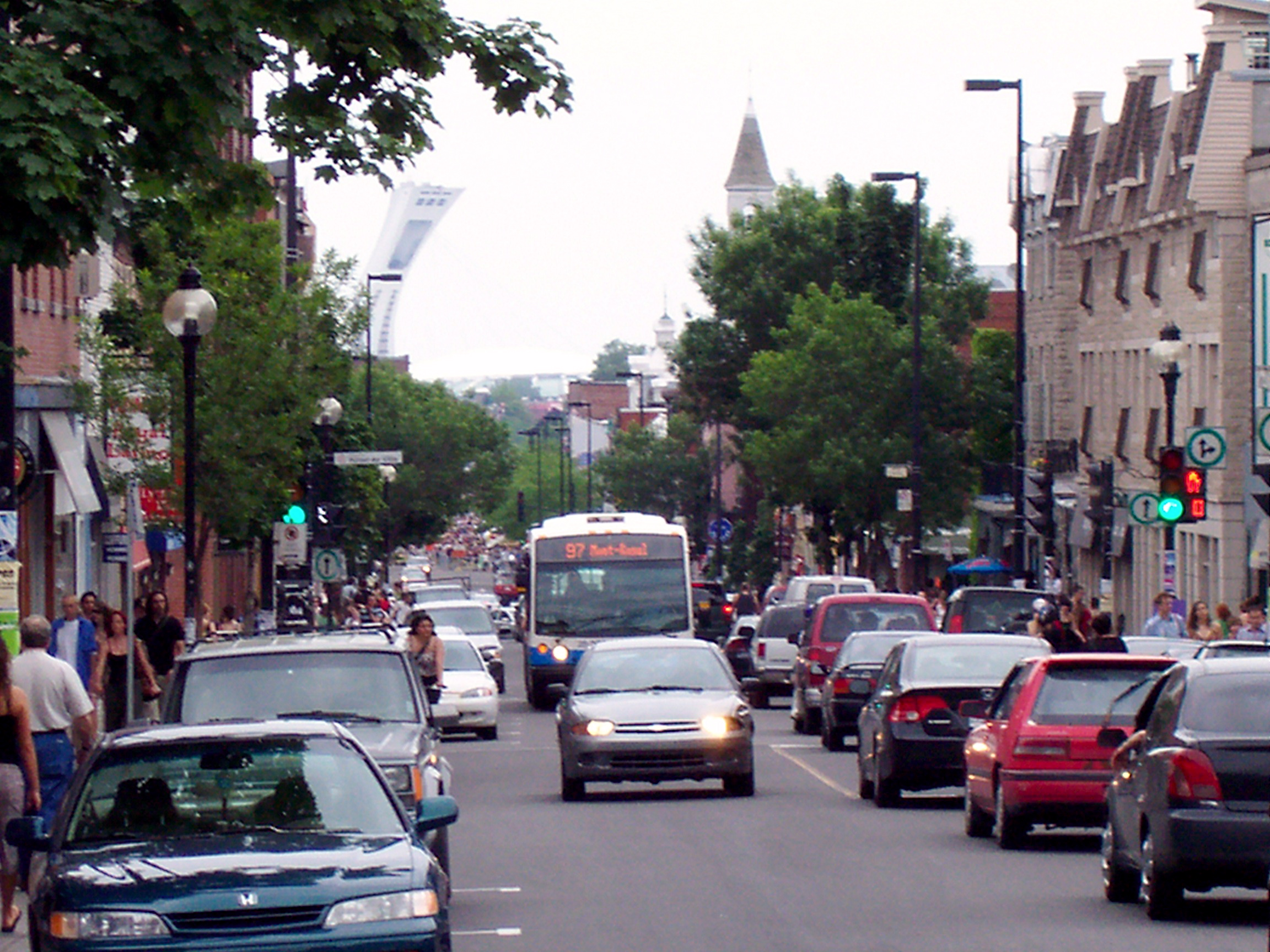
- Mount Royal Avenue looking east, towards Olympic Stadium, June 2007
- Native name: Avenue du Mont-Royal (French)
- Former name(s): Tannery Road (Chemin des Tanneries)
- Location: Montreal
- West end: Avenue Vincent-d'Indy, Outremont
- Major junctions: R-335 Saint Denis Street
- East end: R-125 Pie-IX Boulevard, Rosemont–La Petite-Patrie

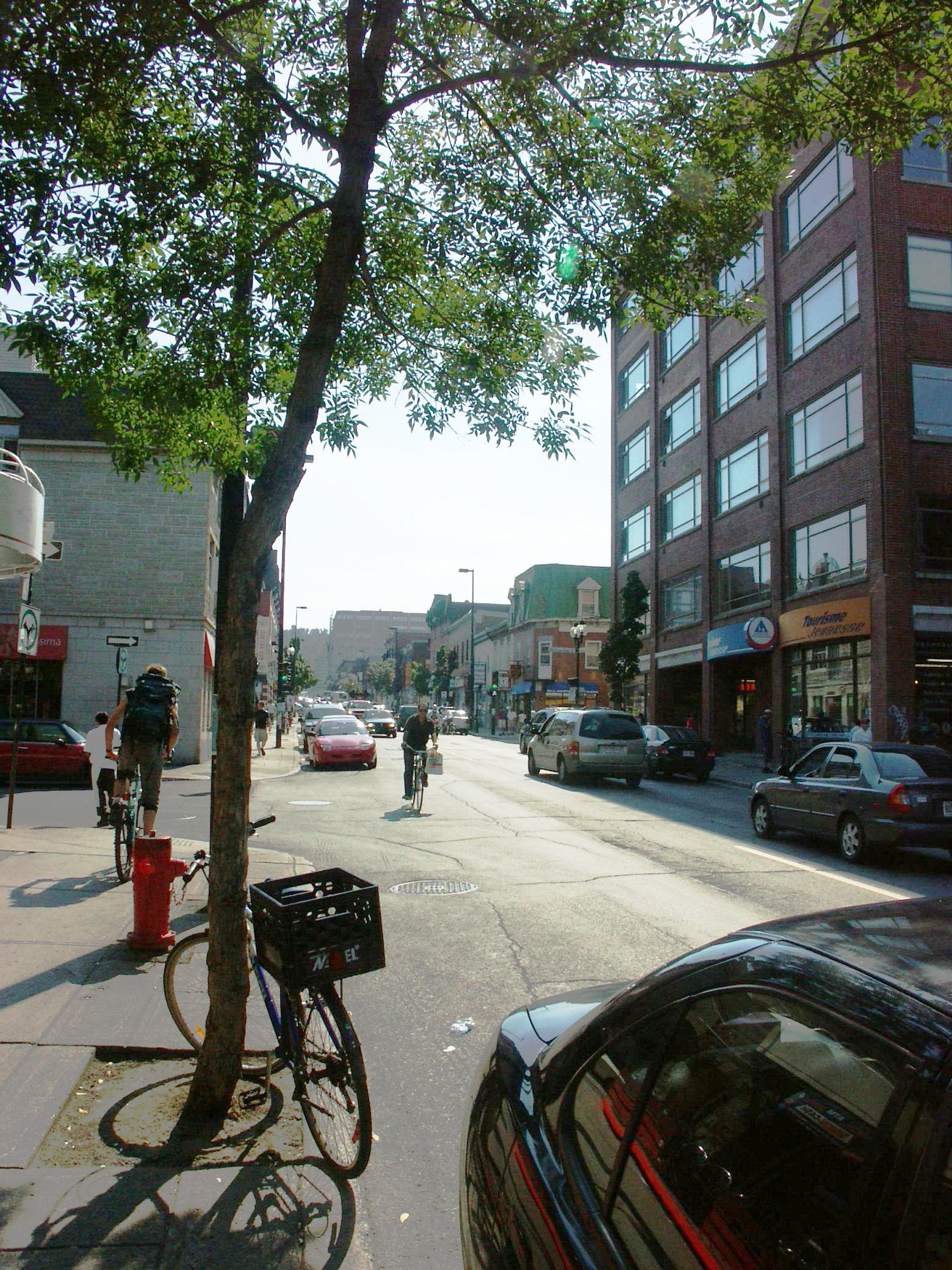
Looking west, towards Mount Royal.

Mount Royal Avenue (officially in French: avenue du Mont-Royal), once named Tannery Road (French: chemin des Tanneries), is a street in Montreal, Quebec, Canada. The main part of the street transects the borough of Le Plateau-Mont-Royal, from Park Avenue at the foot of Mount Royal, for which the road is named, to Frontenac St. Another section in Rosemont–La Petite-Patrie runs from Molson St. to Pie-IX Boulevard. West of Park Avenue, the road continues into Outremont (where it becomes Mount Royal Boulevard), skirting the northern rim of the mountain to a terminus at Vincent d'Indy Avenue near the Édouard-Montpetit metro station.

The western section of the avenue is the principal artery of the Plateau, forming the southern border of the Mile End neighbourhood. Notable businesses on the street include the restaurants La Binerie Mont-Royal and Beauty's. The Mont-Royal metro station is located at the corner of Mount Royal Ave. and Rivard St., at Place Gérald-Godin.
