= La Cage – Brasserie sportive =

- Formerly: La cage aux sports (1984–2015)
- Industry: Food service
- Founder: Georges Durst
- Headquarters: Boucherville, Quebec
- Area served: Canada
- Parent: Groupe Sportscene (renamed Groupe Grandio in June 2022)
- Website: cage.ca

La Cage – Brasserie sportive (known until 2015 as La Cage aux Sports) is a Canadian chain of sports bar restaurants from the province of Quebec. As of 2023, it has 38 locations in Quebec, and one in France.

== History ==
The first "Cage aux sports" was opened in Old Montreal in 1984 by Georges Durst, from Alsace. The name would eventually become "La Cage – Brasserie sportive Cage" in 2015. The restaurant was designed for parties and for families who would come watch hockey on big screens.

Many types of sports were shown, such as Montreal Canadiens hockey, tennis, curling, golf, football (Super Bowl), baseball, UFC, soccer, etc.

In 1989, the first franchise was opened by Jean Bédard in Saint-Hyacinthe. He would then open two more and would become president of the company in 1995. As of 2024, he is still president and the company has 39 locations, with one in Bordeaux, France.

In the 1980s and 1990s, the interiors of La Cage aux Sports bars included many design elements, featuring wood paneling, bright red upholstery, numerous pennants, and various decorative objects such as carousel horses, a British telephone booth, and the large yellow airplane - a signature feature of La Cage aux Sports - suspended from the ceiling, among other things. In the decades following, the company would adopt a more minimalist style. Five restaurants have been fully renovated since 2017, bringing the number of restaurants with the new design to 20. And while the chain still adheres to the “food-beer-sports” formula, it has expanded its offerings under the leadership of Jean Bédard, increasing its beer selection from three to 24 varieties. In the 2010s, it shifted toward a more traditional dining experience, offering menus with greater variety than just chicken and fries.

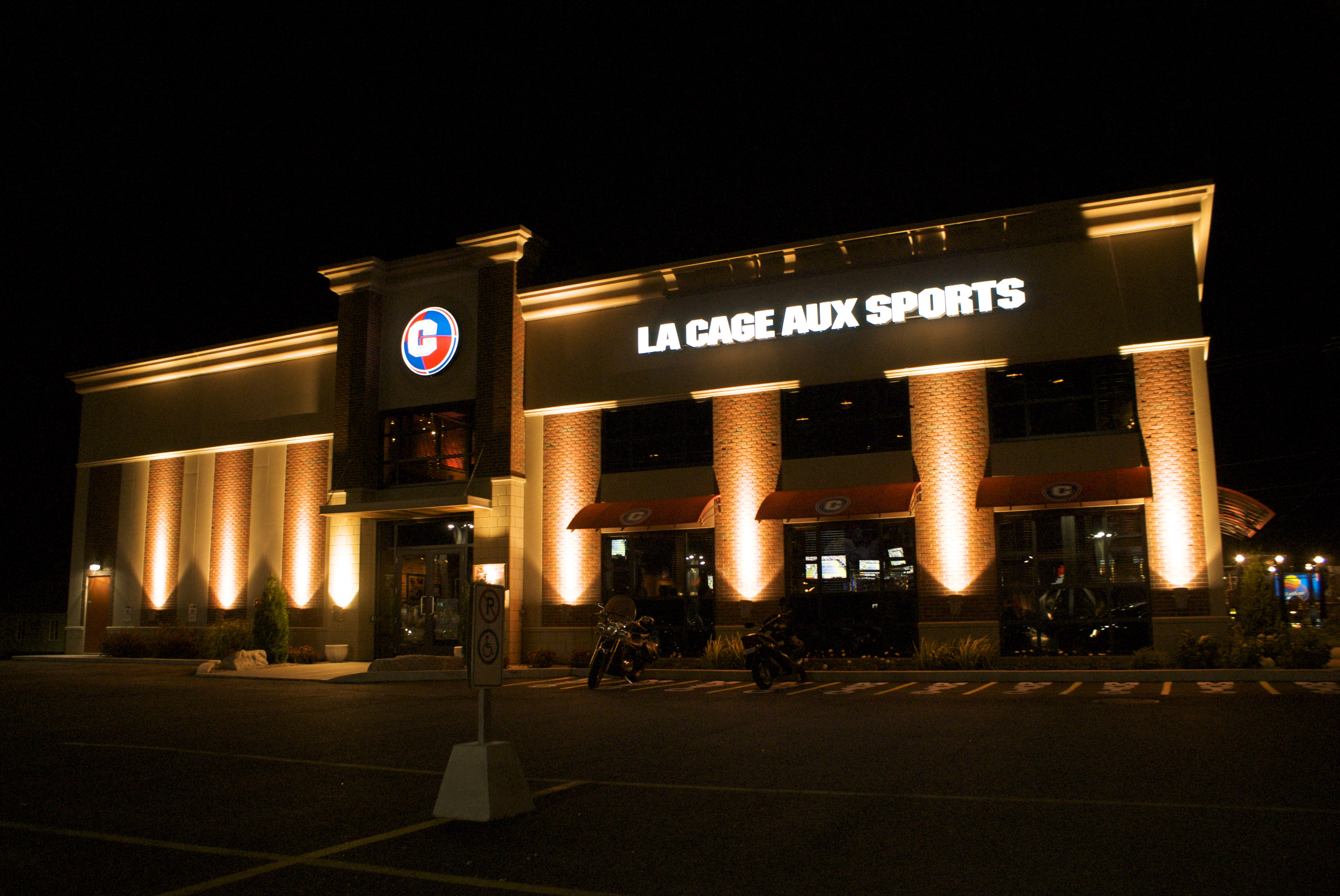
La Cage aux Sports

In March 2020, during the COVID-19 pandemic, the Legault government ordered the closure of all restaurant dining rooms. La Cage opened just 14 restaurants, and only for take-out. Meals were made in a factory in Saint-Jean-Baptiste-de-Rouville, in Montérégie, in which the company invested $500,000 for the renovation work.

== Grocery ==
Like other restaurant chains, La Cage sells its best-selling restaurant dishes in grocery stores. Beginning in 1993, La Cage's chicken wings and ribs were available in the frozen aisle at the supermarket. In 2019, the company embarked on a three-year program to increase grocery sales. It began selling condiments (spices, dressings, sauces, mayonnaises), burger patties, and drinks (beer, cider). In 2020, during the COVID-19 pandemic, grocery sales doubled.
