= Kazimierz =

Former town, former quarter of Kraków, Poland

Coordinates: 50°03′06″N 19°56′41″E

- Former town Former VIII quarter of Kraków
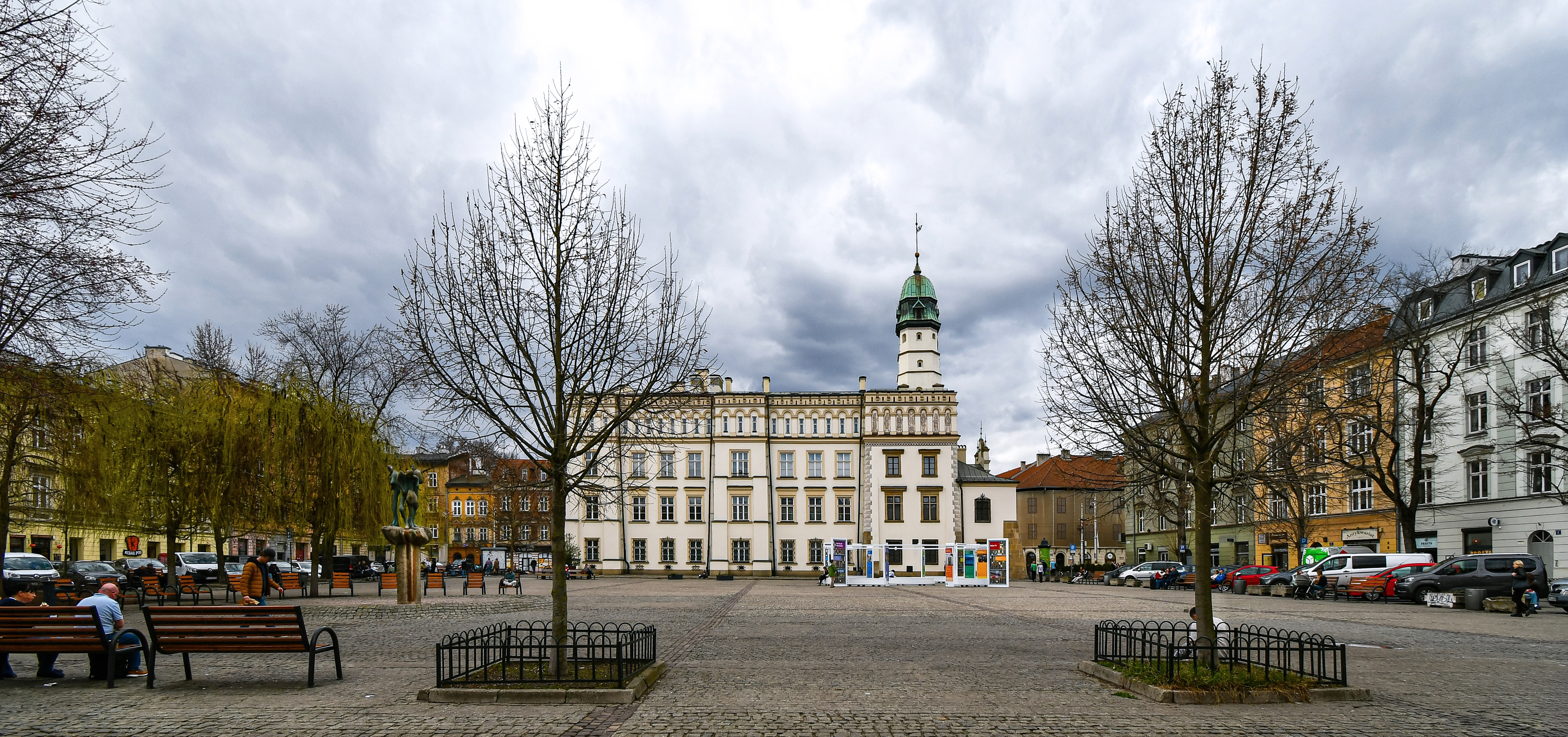
- Wolnica Square, NE part of the former main market square of the city of Kazimierz and old city hall.

- Kazimierz on the map of the district I Old Town
- Country: Poland
- City: Kraków

UNESCO World Heritage Site
- Type: Cultural
- Criteria: iv
- Designated: 1978
- Part of: Historic Centre of Kraków
- Reference no.: 29
- Region: Europe and North America

Historic Monument of Poland
- Designated: 1994-09-08
- Part of: Kraków historical city complex
- Reference no.: M.P. 1994 nr 50 poz. 418

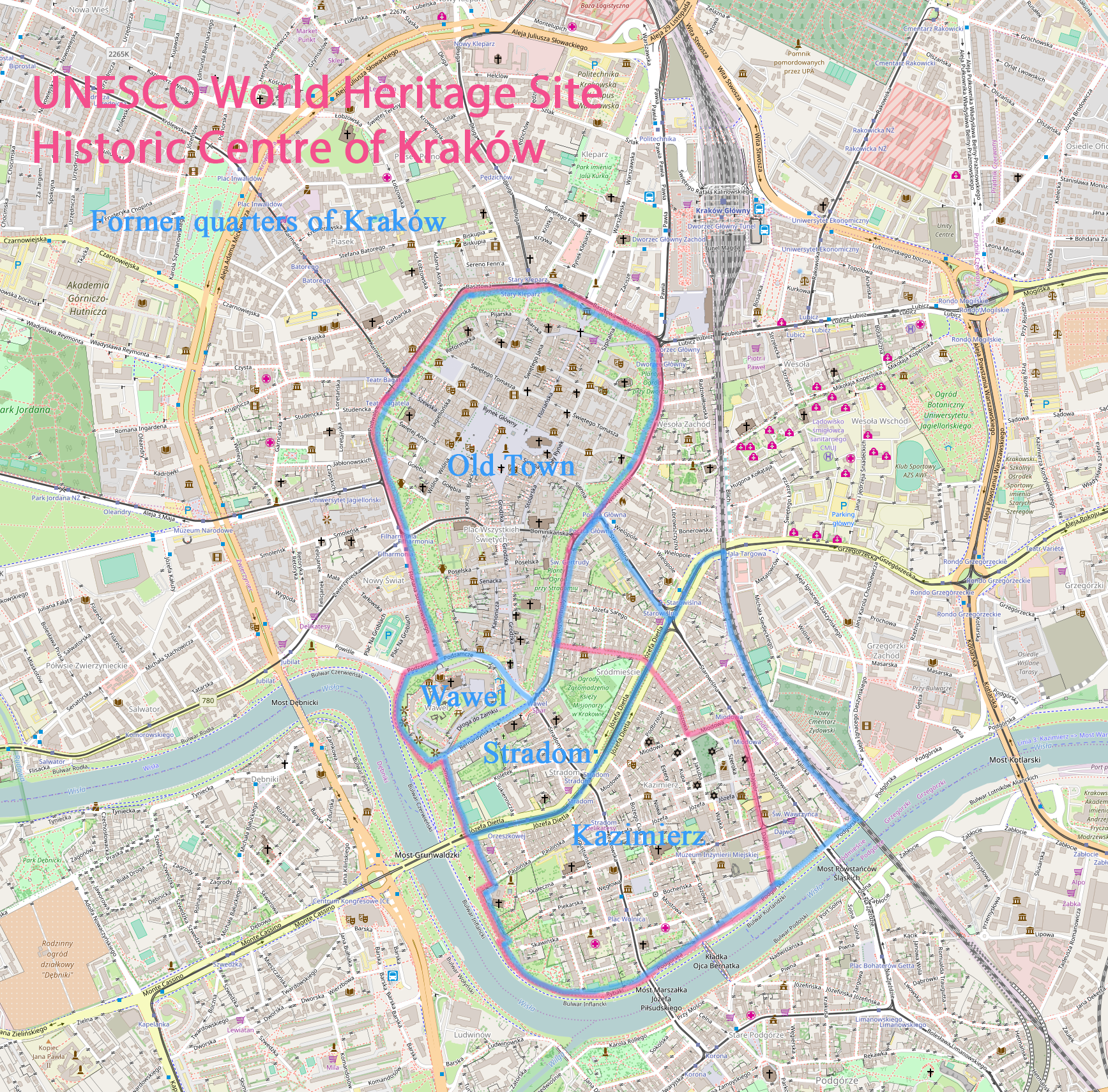
Kazimierz, part of the Historic Centre of Kraków UNESCO World Heritage Site

Kazimierz (Polish pronunciation: [kaˈʑimjɛʂ]; Latin: Casimiria; Yiddish: קוזמיר, romanized: Kuzimyr) was historically a city and is now a district incorporated into Kraków, Poland. Until 1954 the VIII quarter of the city, it is now part of the District I Old Town.

From its inception in the 14th century to the early 19th century, Kazimierz was an independent city, a royal city of the Crown of the Polish Kingdom, located south of the Old Town of Kraków, separated from it by a branch of the Vistula river. For many centuries, Kazimierz was a place where ethnic Polish and Jewish cultures coexisted and intermingled. The northeastern part of the district was historically Jewish. In 1941, the Jews of Kraków were forcibly relocated by the German occupying forces into the Kraków Ghetto just across the river in Podgórze, and most were murdered in the Holocaust. Today, Kazimierz is one of the major tourist attractions of Kraków and an important center of cultural life of the city.

The border between Kazimierz and Kraków was the Old Vistula River, a branch of the Vistula. The riverbed was filled in at the end of the 19th century. and transformed into a green avenue – Józef Dietl Street.

== Early history ==
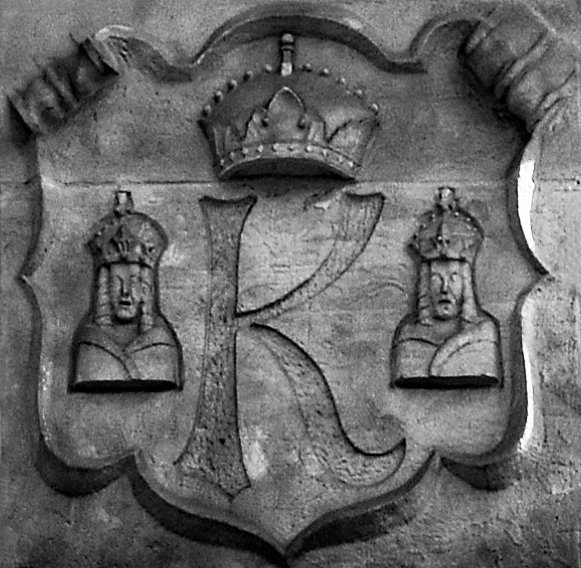
Former coat of arms of the city of Kazimierz

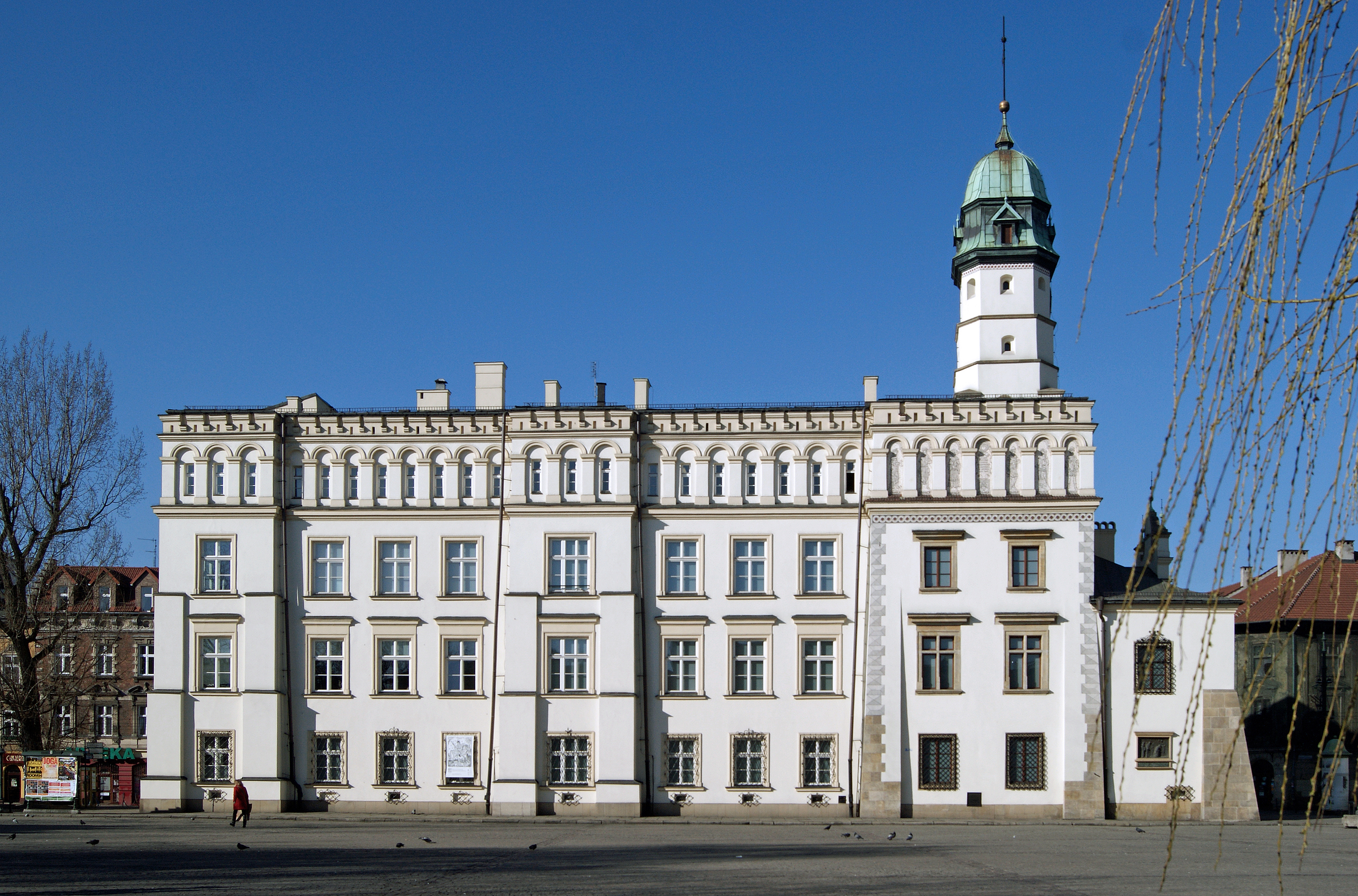
City hall

Paulińska Street and defensive walls of the town of Kazimierz

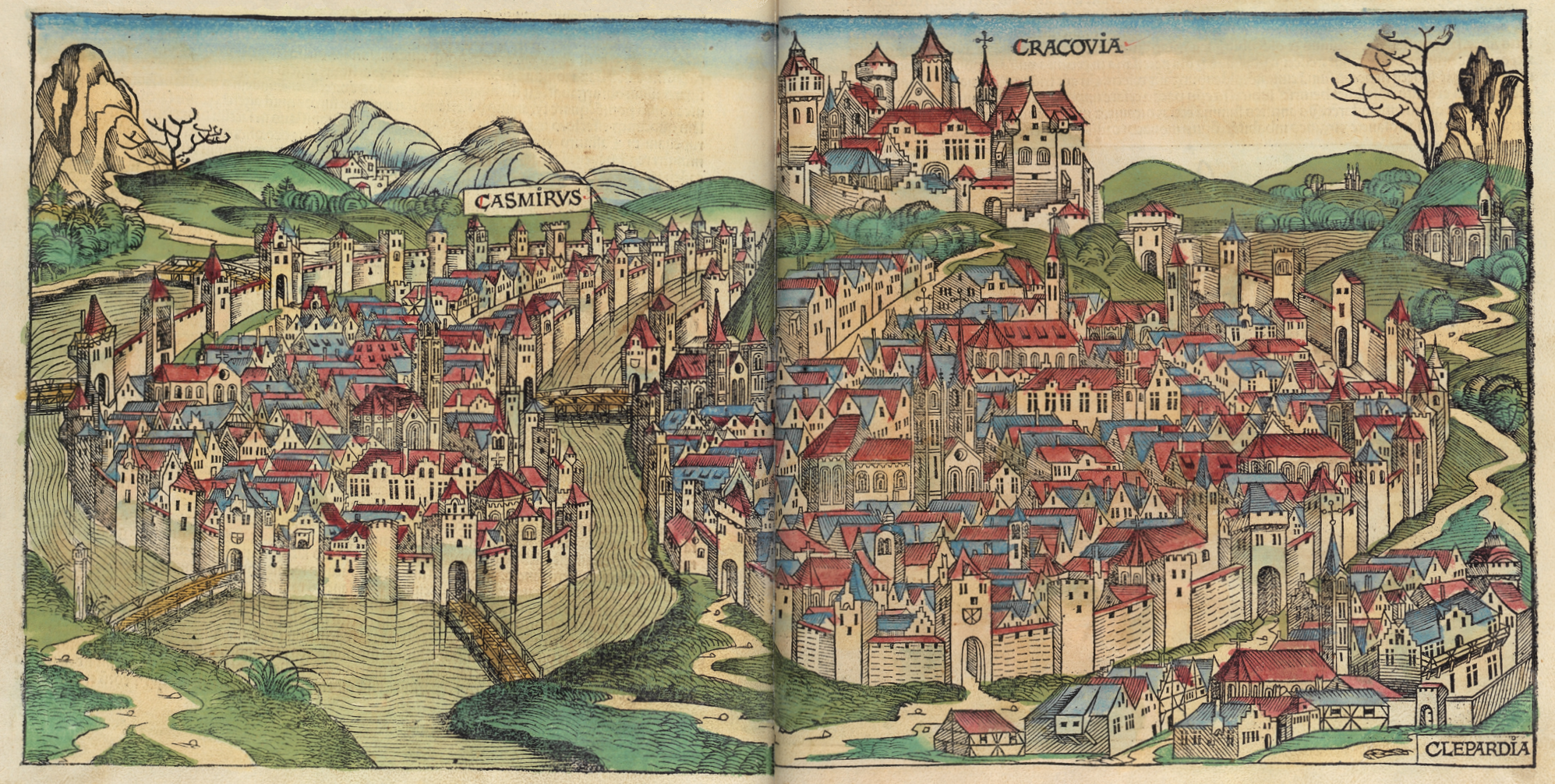
Casmirvs (left) in a 1493 woodcut from Hartmann Schedel's Nuremberg Chronicle (view facing west).

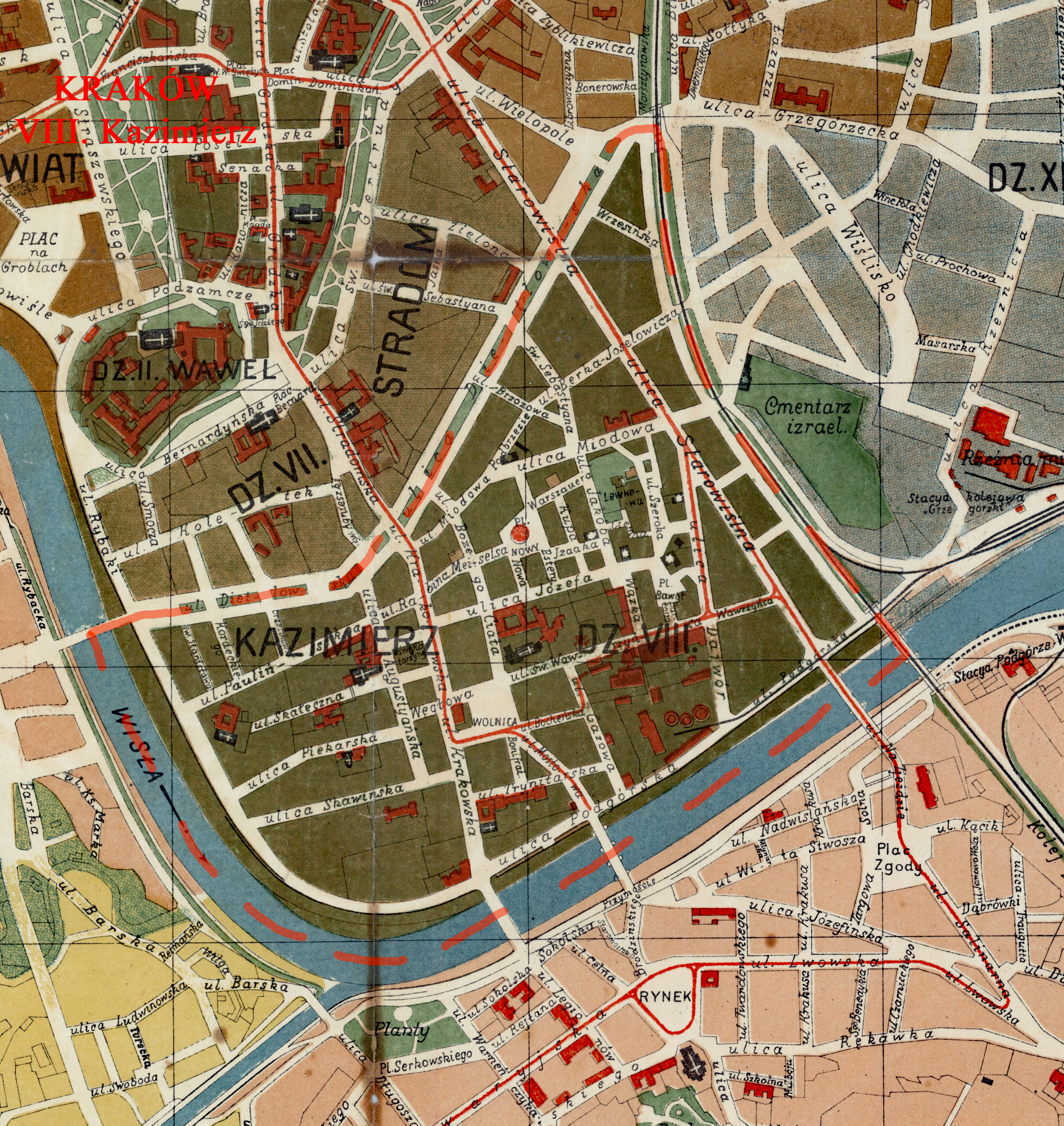
Map of Kazimierz, formerly (to 1954) VIII quarter of a city of Kraków.

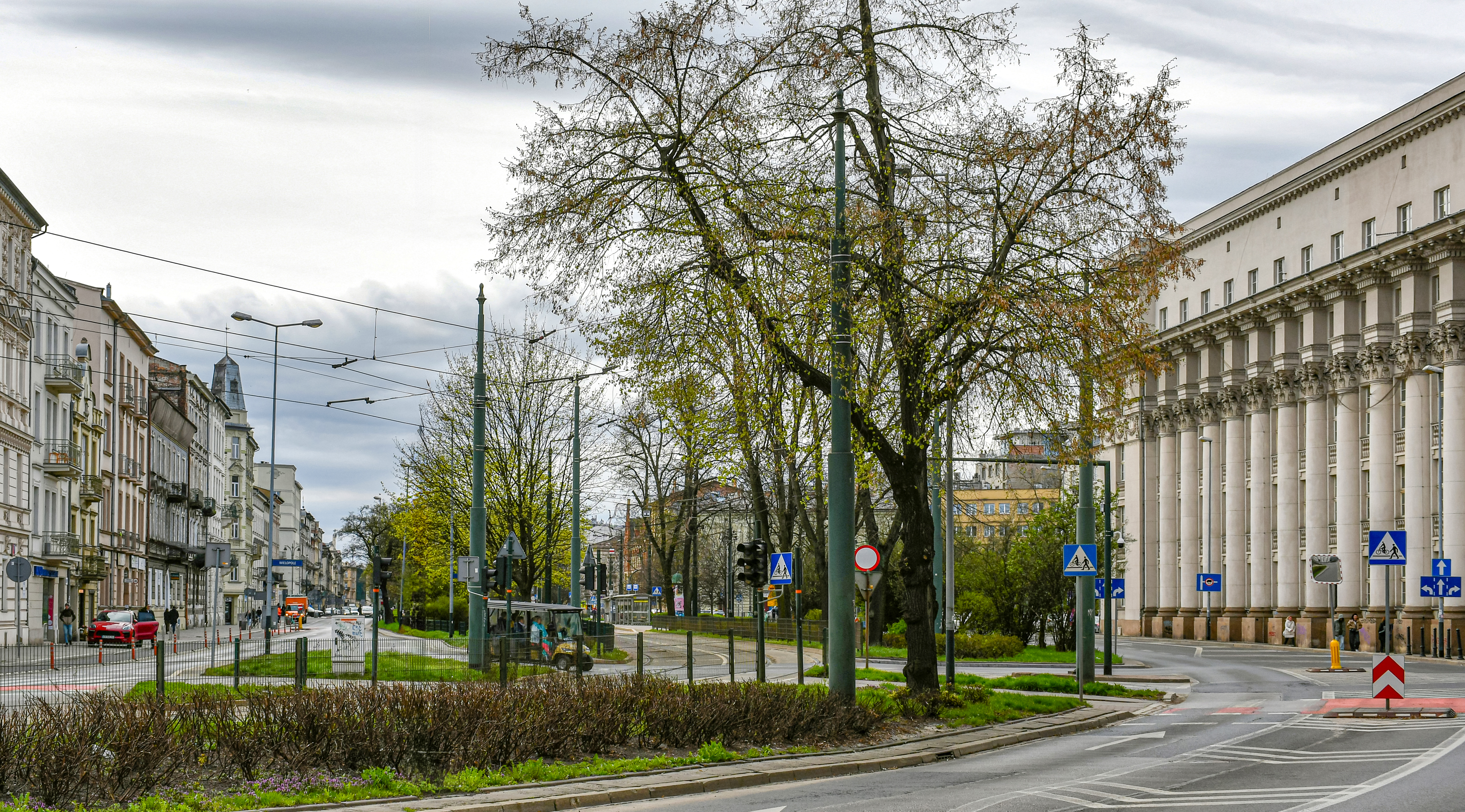
Józef Dietl Street northern part The former riverbed of the Old Vistula. Kazimierz on the left.

Three early medieval settlements are known to have existed on the island defining Kazimierz. The most important of these was the pre-Christian pagan Slavic shrine at Skałka (“the little rock”) at the western, upstream tip of the island. This site, with its sacred pool, was later Christianised as the Church of St. Michael the Archangel in the 11th century and was the legendary site of the martyrdom of St. Stanisław. There was a nearby noble manor complex to the southeast and an important cattle-market town of Bawół, possibly based on an old tribal gord (Polish: gród), at the edges of the habitable land near the swamps that composed the eastern, downstream end of the island. There was also a much smaller island upstream of Kazimierz known as the “Tatar Island” after the Tatar cemetery there. This smaller island has since washed away.

On 27 March 1335, King Casimir III of Poland (Kazimierz Wielki) declared the two western suburbs of Kraków to be a new town named after him, Kazimierz (Casimiria in Latin). Shortly thereafter, in 1340, Bawół was also added to it, making the boundaries of new city the same as the whole island. King Casimir granted his Casimiria location privilege in accordance with Magdeburg Law and, in 1362, ordered defensive walls to be built. He settled the newly built central section primarily with burghers, with a plot set aside for the Augustinian order next to Skałka. He also began work on a campus for the Kraków Academy which he founded in 1364, but Casimir died in 1370 and the campus was never completed.

Perhaps the most important feature of medieval Kazimierz was the Pons Regalis, the only major, permanent bridge across the Vistula (Polish: Wisła) for several centuries. This bridge connected Kraków via Kazimierz to the Wieliczka Salt Mine and the lucrative Hungarian trade route. The last bridge at this location (at the end of modern Stradomska Street) was dismantled in 1880 when the filling-in of the Old Vistula river bed under Mayor Mikołaj Zyblikiewicz made it obsolete.

== Jewish Kazimierz ==
Jews had played an important role in the Kraków regional economy since the end of the 13th century, granted the freedom of worship, trade and travel by Bolesław the Pious in his General Charter of Jewish Liberties issued already in 1264. The Jewish community in Kraków had lived undisturbed alongside their ethnic Polish neighbours under the protective King Casimir III the Great, the last king of the Piast dynasty. Nevertheless, in the early 15th century pressured by the Synod of Constance some dogmatic clergy began to push for less official tolerance. Accusations of blood libel by a fanatic priest in Kraków led to riots against the Jews in 1407 even though the royal guard hastened to their rescue.

As part of the re-founding of the Kraków university, starting in 1400, the Academy began to buy outbuildings in the Old Town. Some Jews moved to the area around modern Plac Szczepański. The oldest synagogue building standing in Poland was built in Kazimierz at around that time, either in 1407 or 1492 (the date varies with several sources). It is an Orthodox fortress synagogue called the Old Synagogue. In 1494 a disastrous fire destroyed a large part of Kraków. In 1495 the Polish king John I Albert (Jan Olbracht) ordered Jews out of the Old Town of Kraków and allowed to settle in the Bawół district of Kazimierz. The Jewish Qahal petitioned the Kazimierz town council for the right to build its own interior walls, cutting across the western end of the older defensive walls in 1553. Due to the growth of the community and the influx of Jews from Bohemia, the walls were expanded again in 1608. Later requests to expand the walls were turned down as redundant.

The area between the walls was known as the Oppidum Judaeorum, the Jewish City, which represented only about one-fifth of the geographical area of Kazimierz, but nearly half of its inhabitants. The Oppidum became the main spiritual and cultural centre of Polish Jewry, hosting many of Poland's finest Jewish scholars, artists and craftsmen. Among its famous inhabitants were the Talmudist Moses Isserles, the Court Jew Abraham of Bohemia, the Kabbalist Natan Szpiro, and the royal physician Shmuel bar Meshulam.

After the 1795 Third Partition of Poland, Kraków was acquired by Austria, and Kazimierz lost its status as a separate city and became a district of Kraków. In 1822, the walls were torn down, removing any physical reminder of the old borders between Jewish and ethnic Polish Kazimierz. The richer Jewish families had moved out of the overcrowded streets of eastern Kazimierz, but because of the injunction against travel on the Sabbath, most Jewish families stayed relatively close to the historic synagogues in the old Oppidum, maintaining Kazimierz's reputation as a “Jewish district” long after the concept ceased to have any administrative meaning.

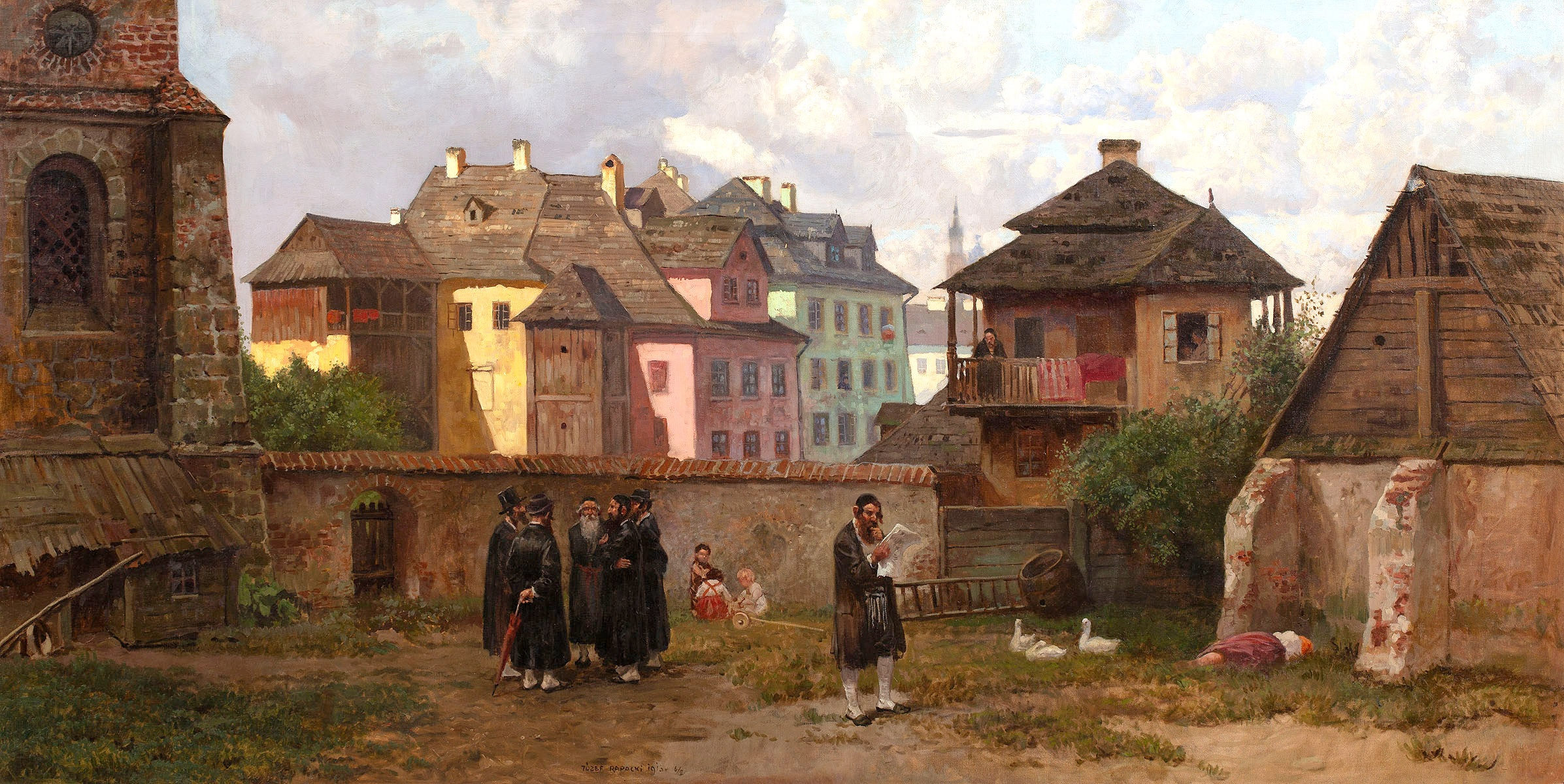
In Krakow's Kazimierz (1916), by Józef Rapacki.

By the 1930s, Kraków had 120 officially registered synagogues and prayer houses scattered across the city and much of Jewish intellectual life had moved to new centres like Podgórze. In a tourist guide that was published in 1935, Meir Balaban, a Reform rabbi and professor of history at the University of Warsaw, lamented that the Jews who remained in the once vibrant Oppidum were “only the poor and the ultraconservative.” However, this same exodus was the reason why most of the buildings in the Oppidum are preserved today in something close to their 18th century shape.

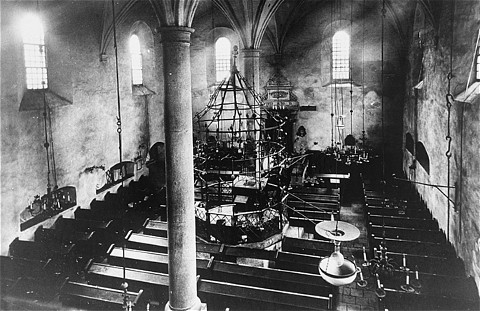
Interior of the Old Synagogue of Kazimierz before 1939.

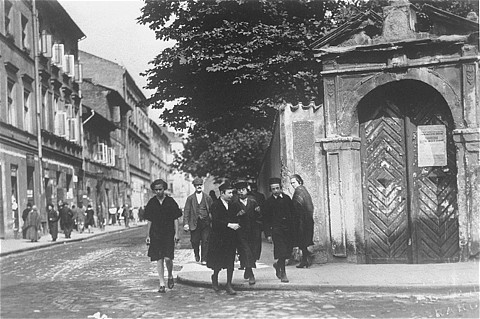
Jewish children in front of Corpus Christi church sometime before 1939.

During the Second World War, the Jews of Krakow, including those in Kazimierz, were forced by the Nazis into a crowded ghetto in Podgórze, across the river. On December 5–6, 1939, the Germans blockaded all Jewish homes in Kazimierz and other parts of Kraków and brutally confiscated everything collectively valued more than Zł 2,000 ($625) from individual Jewish residences. Later on, all non Jewish Polish residents living in the parts of Podgórze were ordered to move to Kazimierz by March 20, 1941. Jews were given the same amount of time to move to the ghetto in the opposite direction. Some non Jewish Poles told the Germans that it would be impossible to move some of their businesses and workshops to Kazimierz because of inadequate facilities there. Their appeals fell on deaf ears. Most of Jews were later killed during the liquidation of the ghetto or in death camps.

== Postwar Jewish Kazimierz ==
After the Second World War, on 11 August 1945, the Kraków pogrom took place in Kazimierz, in which the Kupa Synagogue was burned down and many Jews were assaulted by a Polish mob. During the war, the Nazis had largely destroyed Kazimierz, and the communist authorities left it a crumbling ruin. It became a dark and dangerous place, devoid of Jews.

Since 1988, a popular annual Jewish Cultural Festival has drawn Cracovians back to the heart of the Oppidum and re-introduced Jewish culture to a generation of Poles who have grown up without Poland's historic Jewish community. In 1993, Steven Spielberg shot his film Schindler's List largely in Kazimierz (in spite of the fact that very little of the action historically took place there) and this drew international attention to Kazimierz. The filming crew used different locations of Kazimierz to create scenes from the movie: Oskar Schindler's apartment (Straszewskiego 7), Marshal Józef Piłsudski bridge, “Plac Zgody” (in fact, Szeroka street in Kazimierz), the courtyard of the Drezner family (between Jozefa and Beera Meiselsa streets), the scene with Leopold Pfefferberg on an empty street (the intersection of Jakuba and Ciemna streets), ghetto hospital scene (today: a police station on Szeroka street) Since 1993, there have been parallel developments in the restoration of important historic sites in Kazimierz and a booming growth in Jewish-themed restaurants, bars, bookstores and souvenir shops. In addition, some Jews have moved to Kazimierz from Israel and the United States. Kazimierz as well as Kraków has had a small growth in the Jewish population recently.

A Jewish youth group now meets weekly in Kazimierz and the Remah Synagogue, which actively serves a small congregation of mostly elderly Cracovian Jews.

Each year at the end of June, the Jewish Culture Festival takes place in Kazimierz. It is Europe's largest Jewish festival of culture and music and attracts visitors from around the world. Music at the festival is very diverse and played by bands from the Middle East, the United States and Africa, besides others.

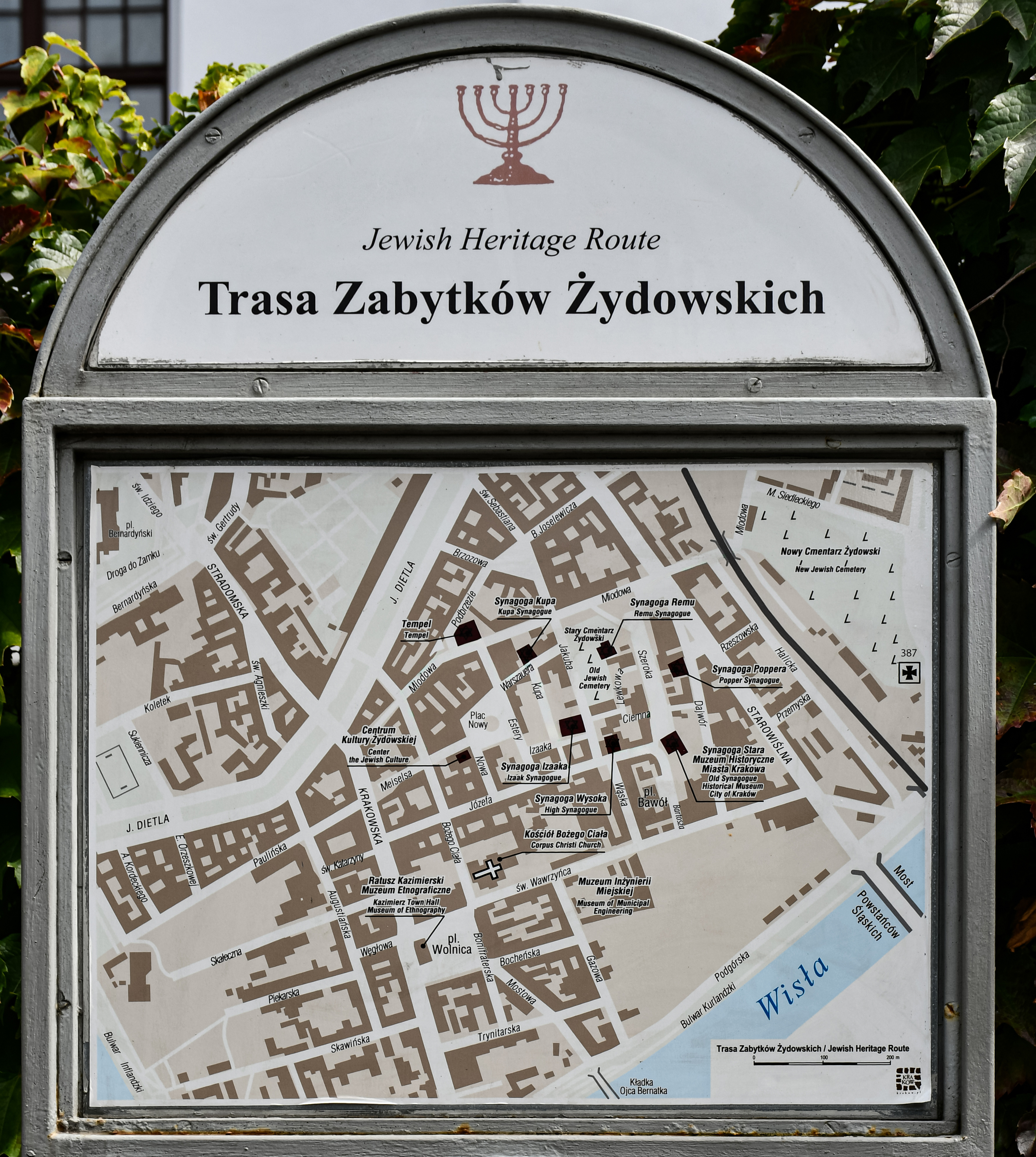
Jewish Heritage Route in Kazimierz, plan

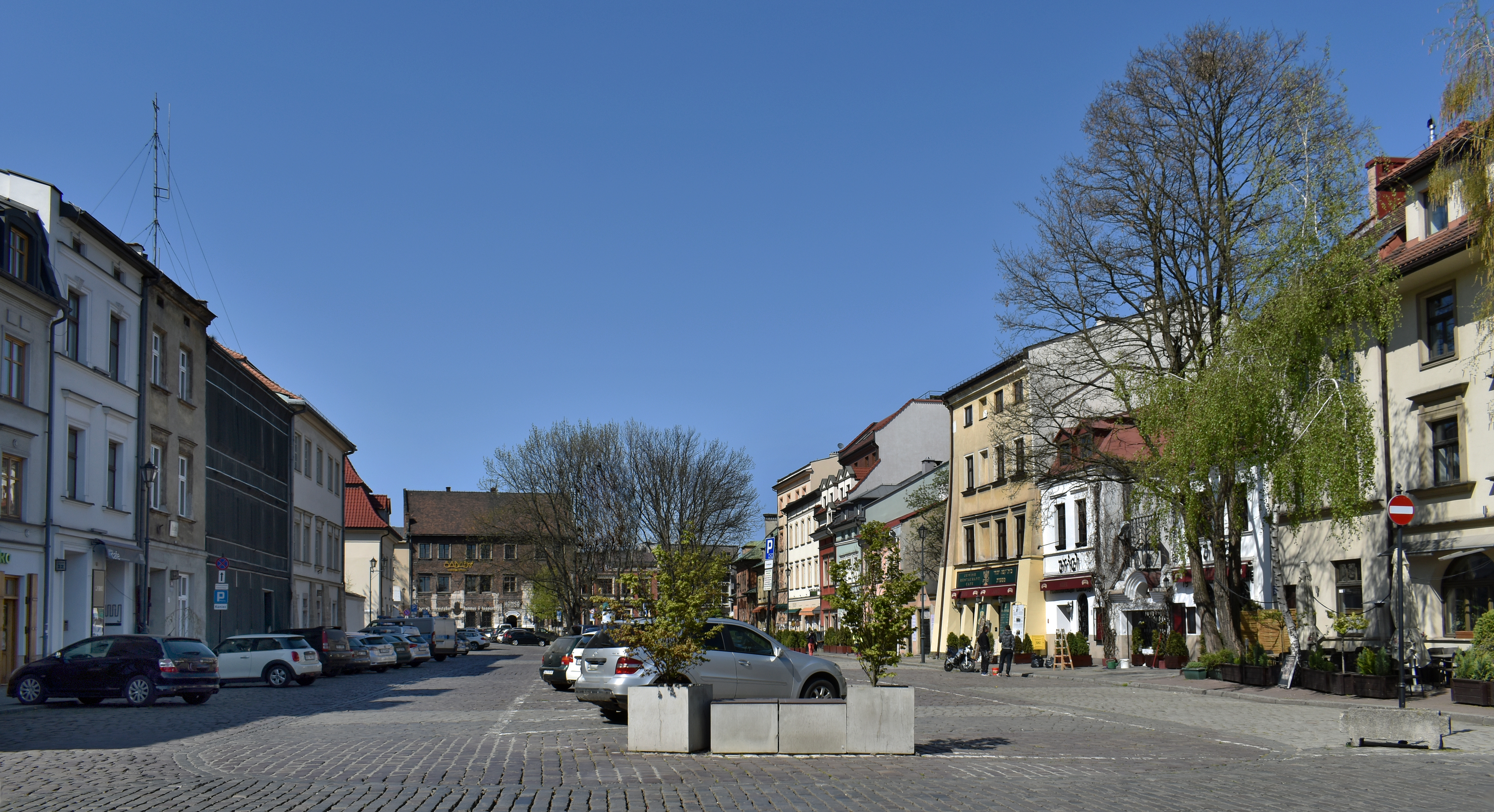
Szeroka Street view from the south

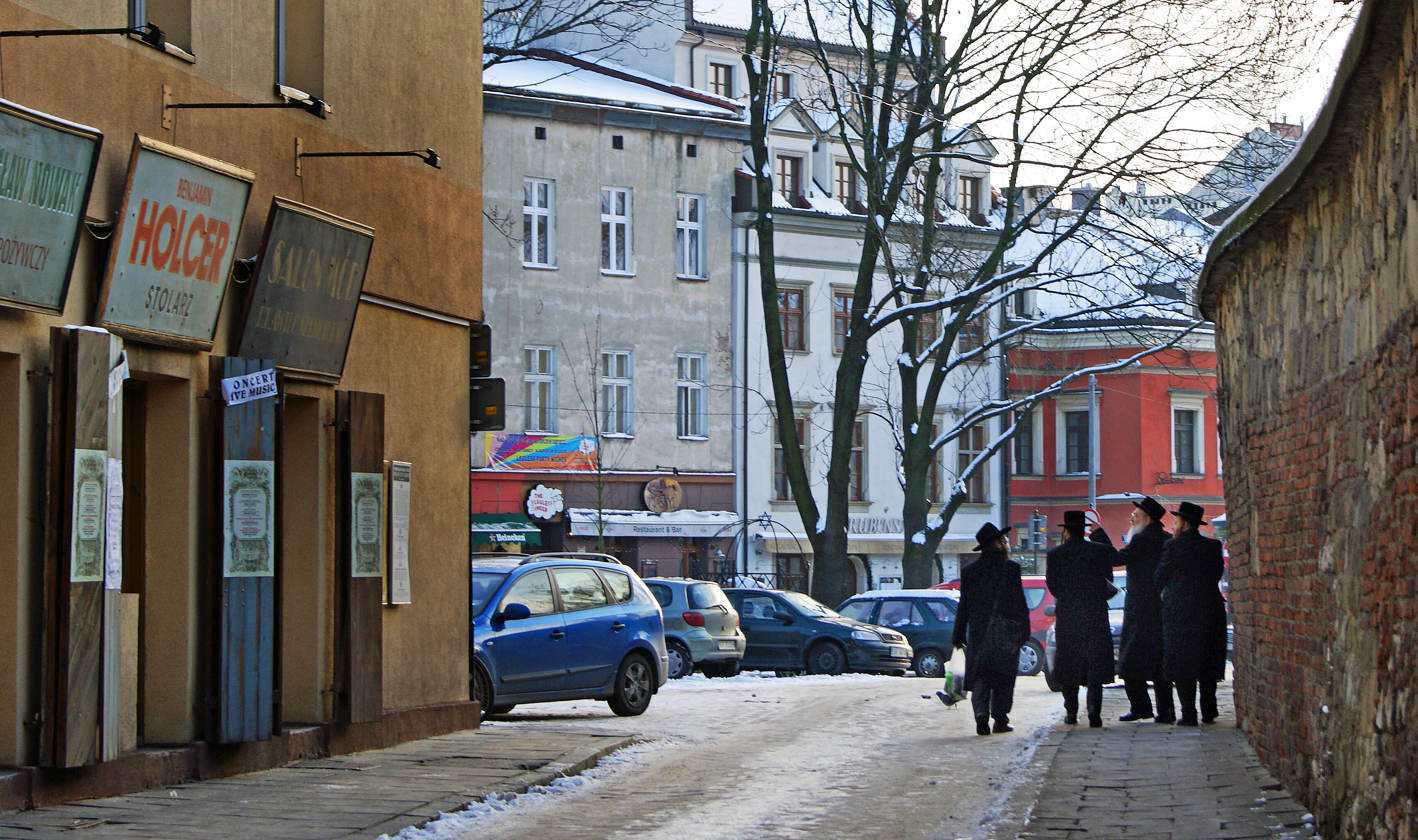
Haredi Jews in the Szeroka Street

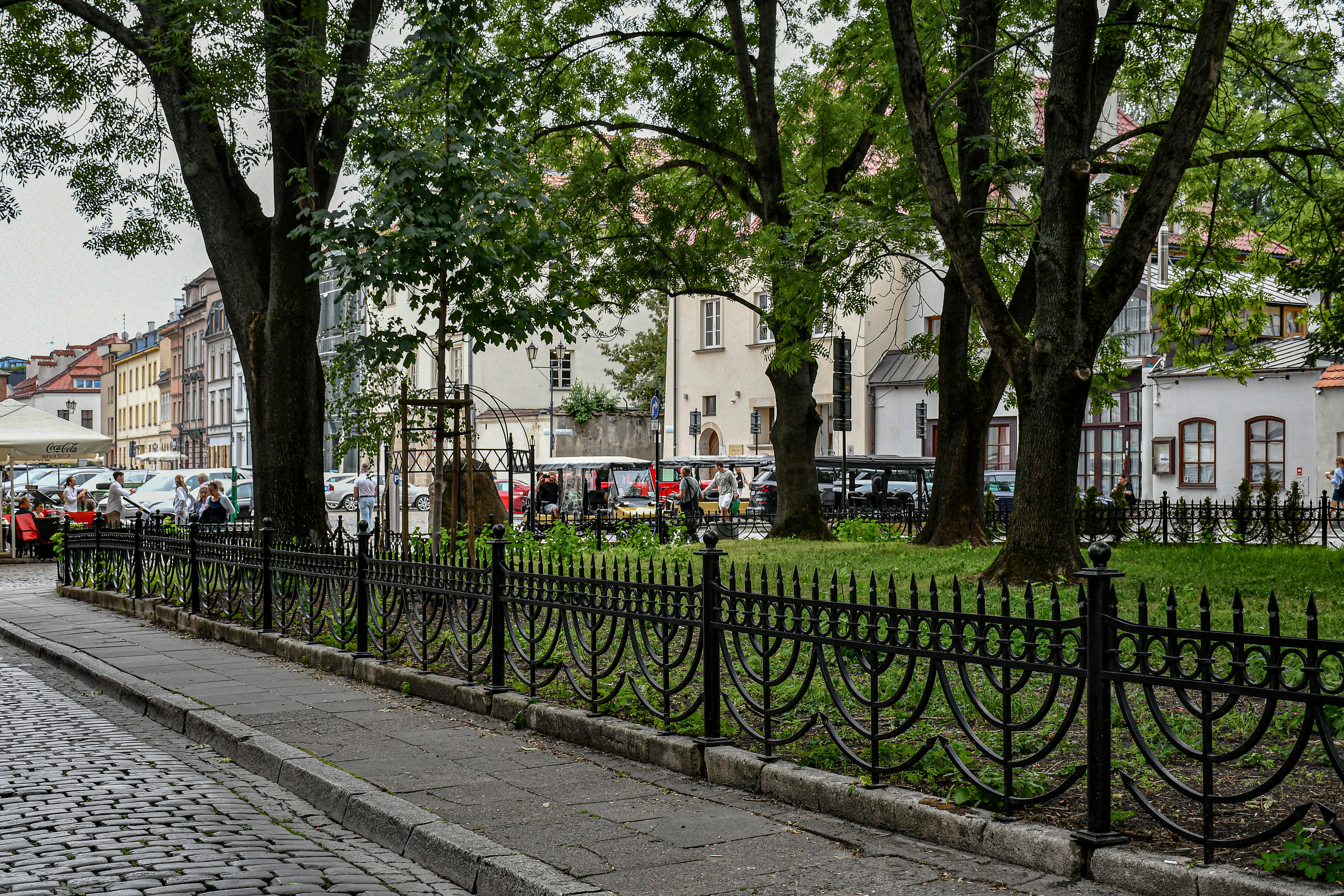
Szeroka Street probably the oldest Jewish cemetery existing before 1560

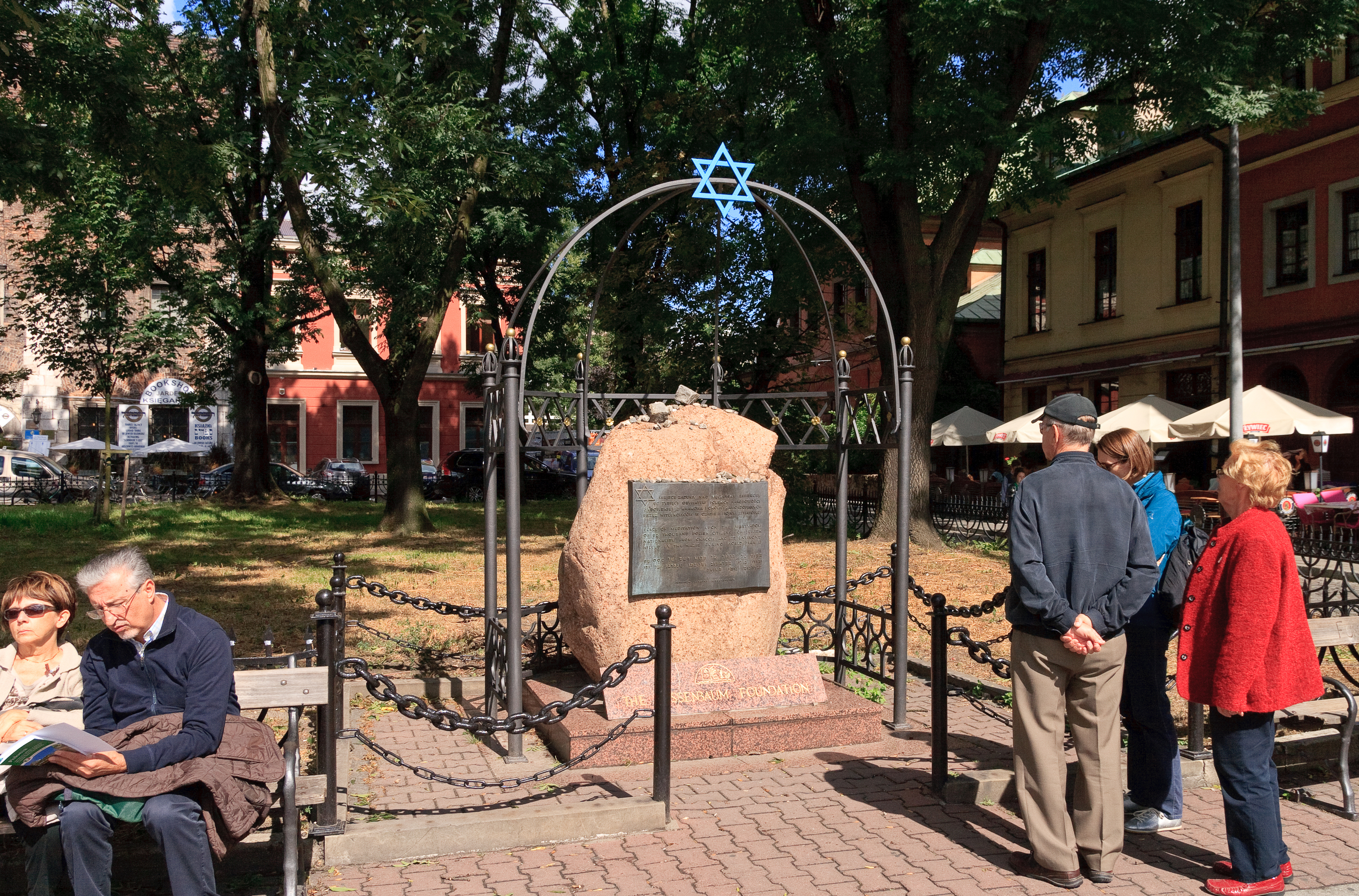
Holocaust Memorial Monument at Szeroka Street

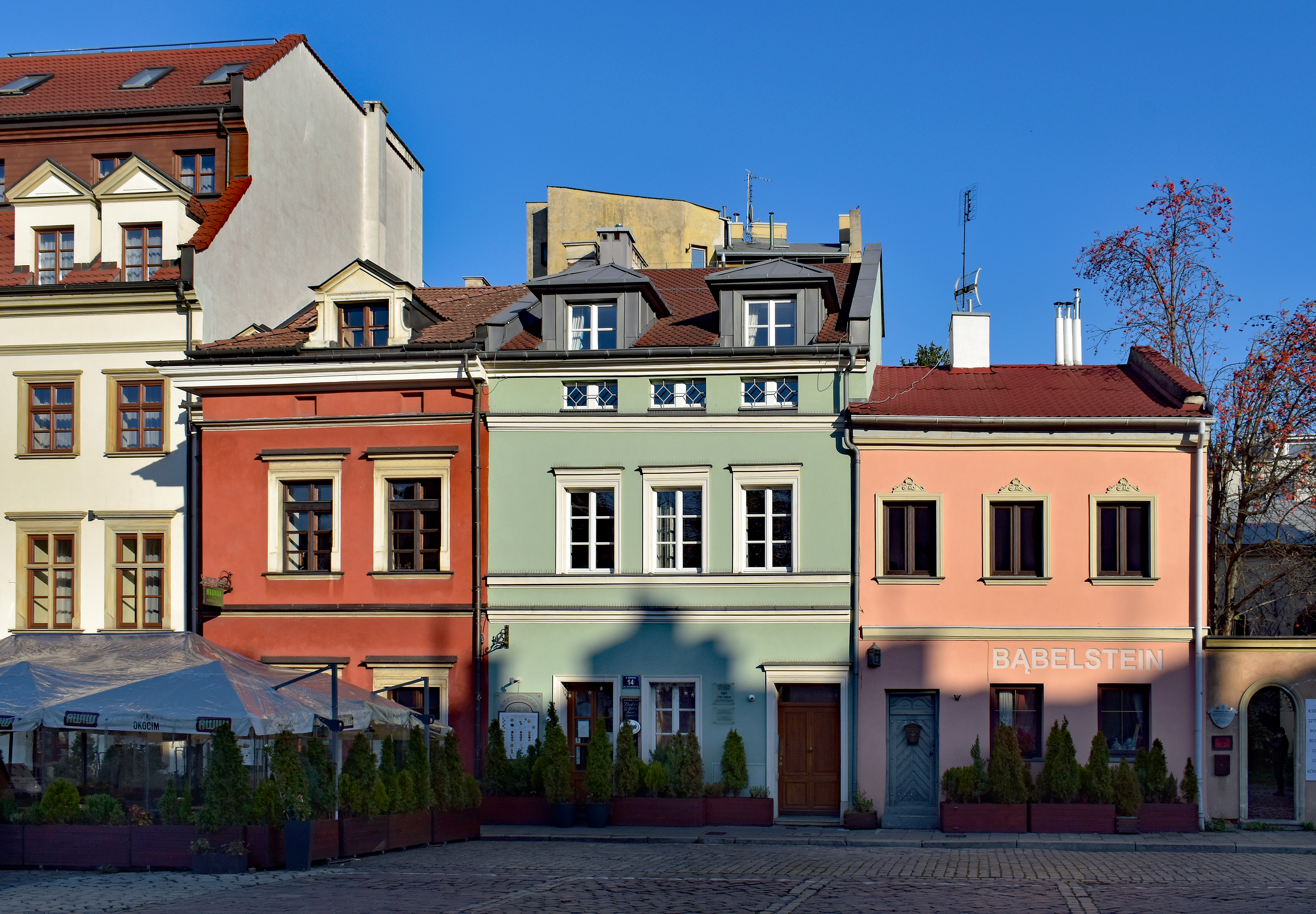
Helena Rubinstein's birth house (green)
14 Szeroka Street

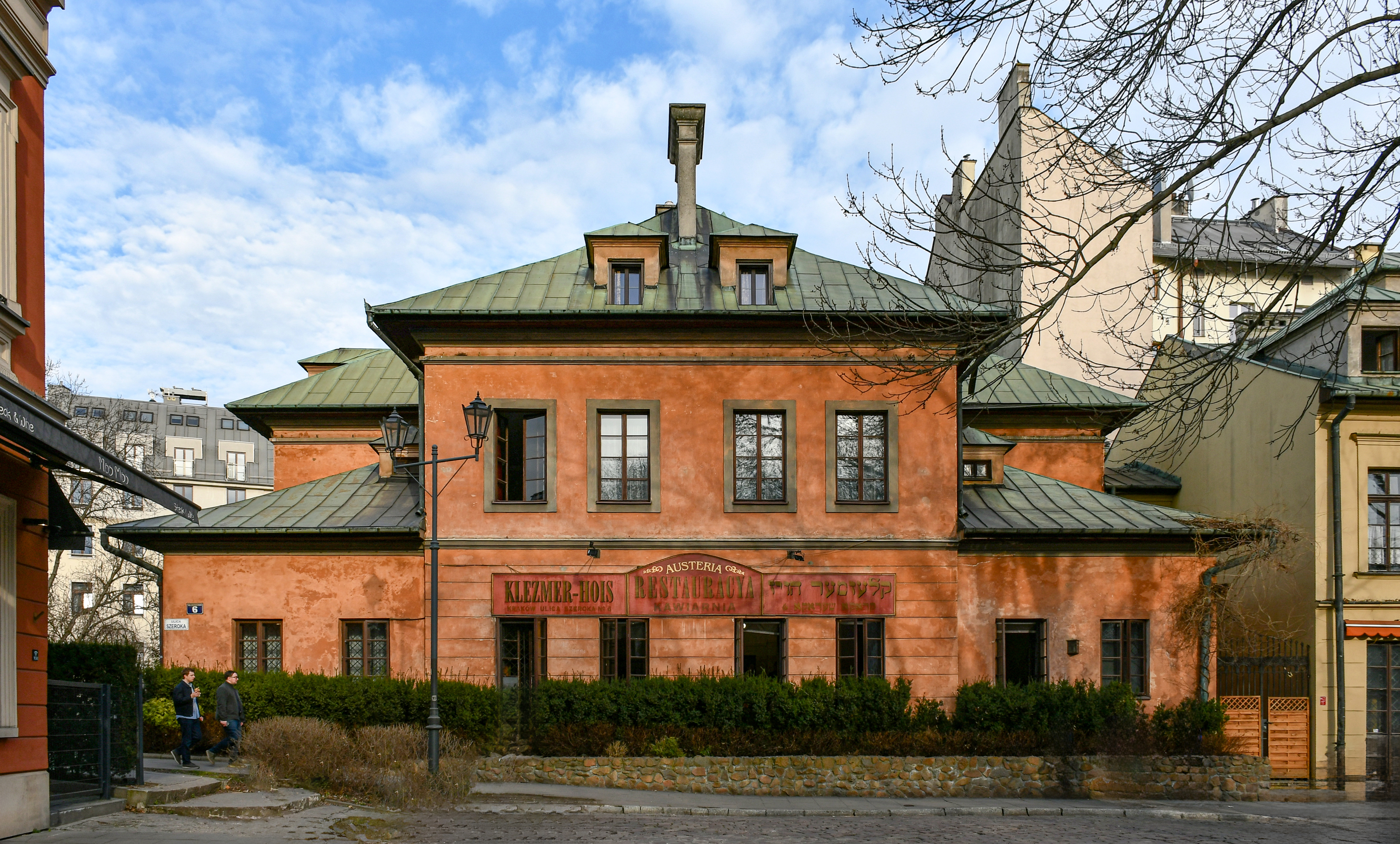
Great Mikvah
6 Szeroka Street

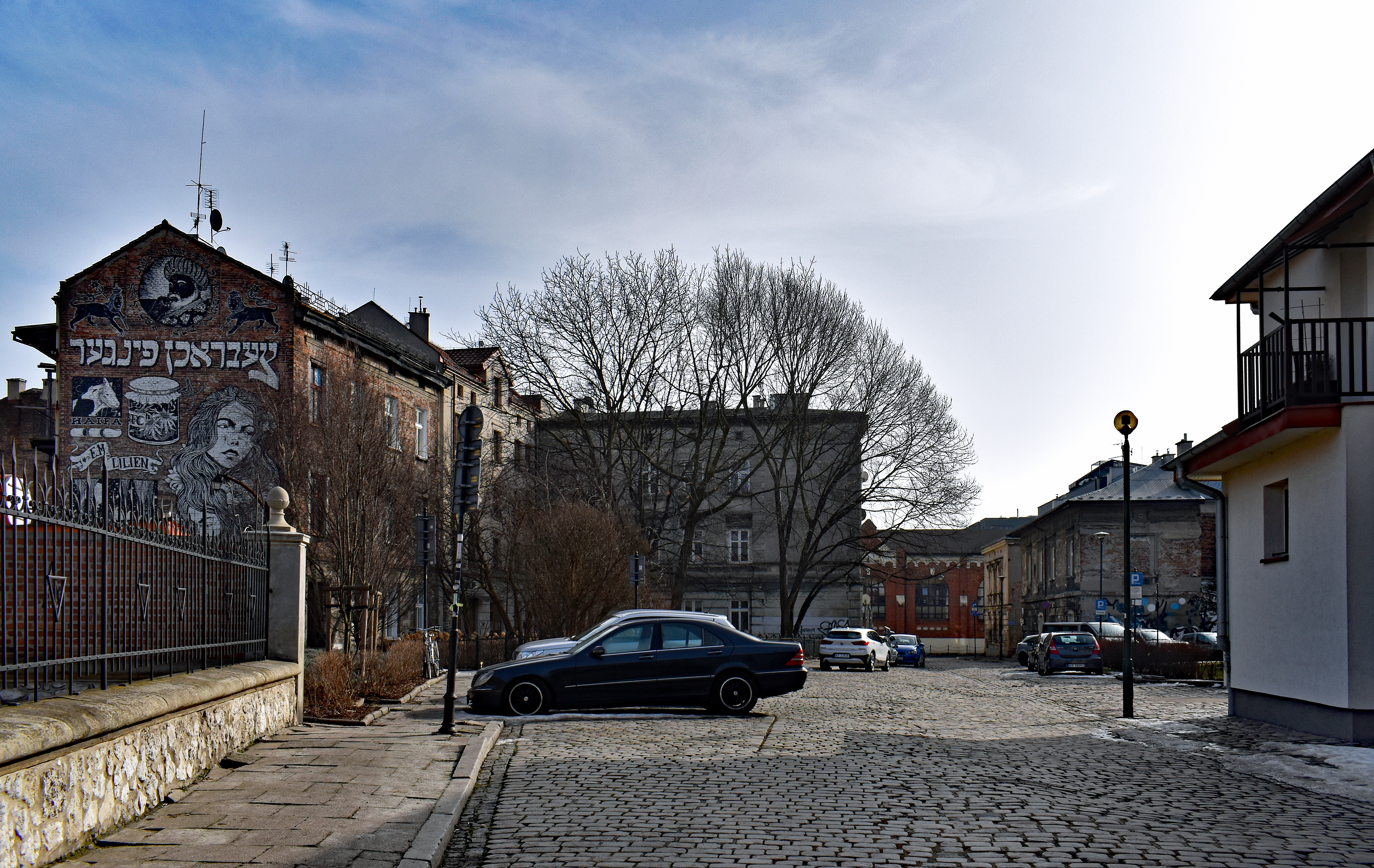
Bawół Square.
The mural takes inspiration from art nouveau era artist Ephraim Moses Lilien

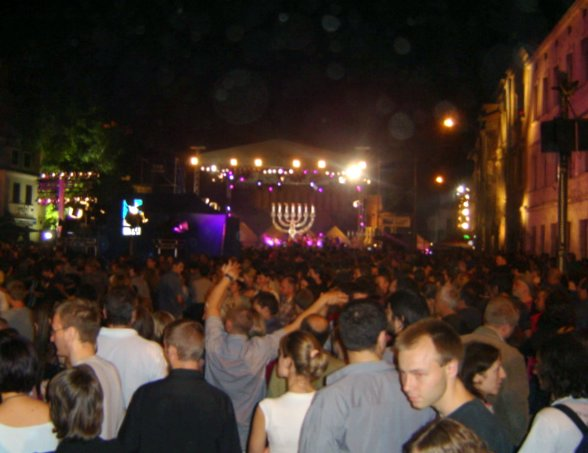
Jewish Culture Festival in Kraków, annual cultural event organized since 1988 on Szeroka Street

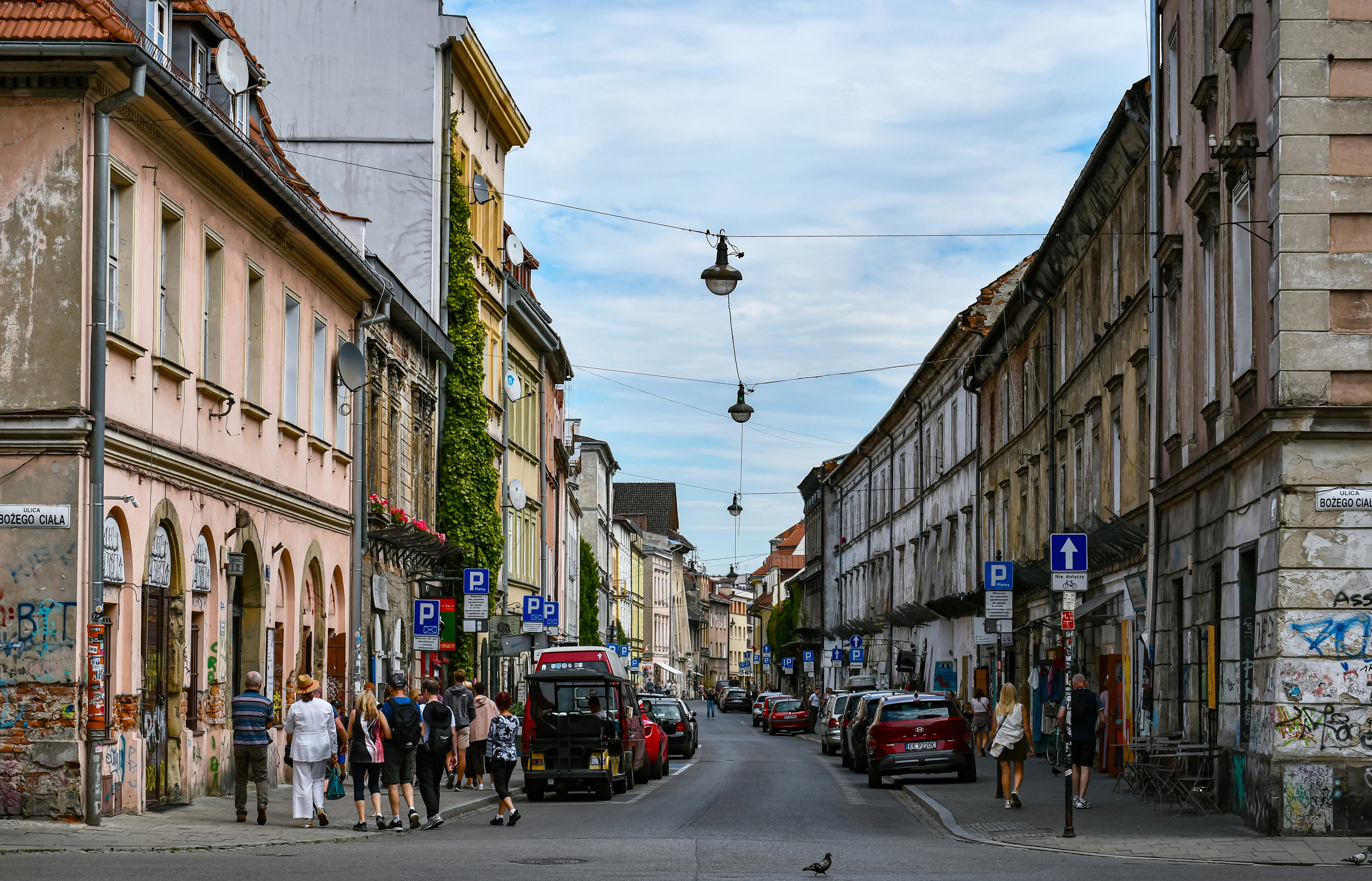
Józefa Street

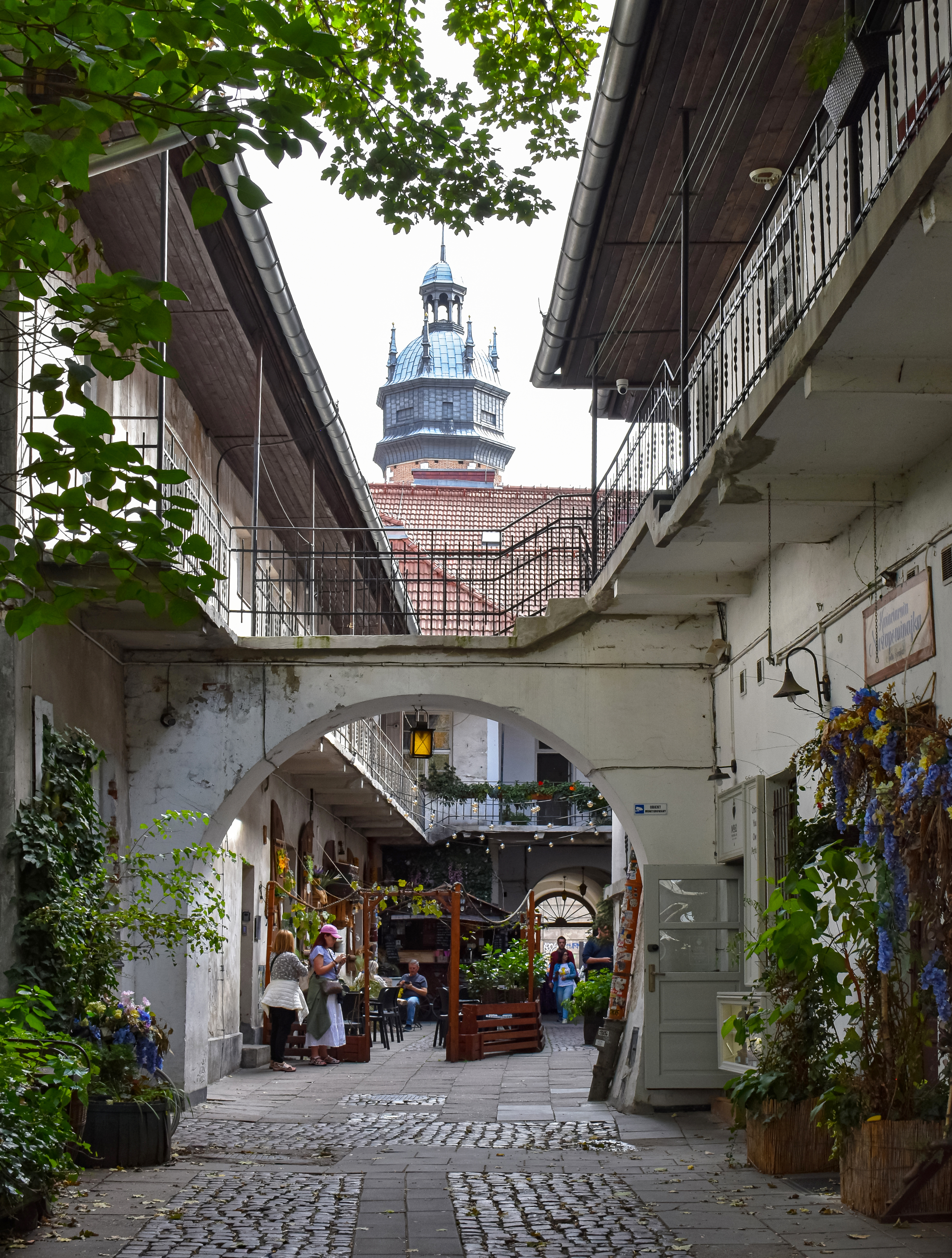
Courtyard of the former inn
12 Józefa Street
(15 Rabbi Meisels Street)

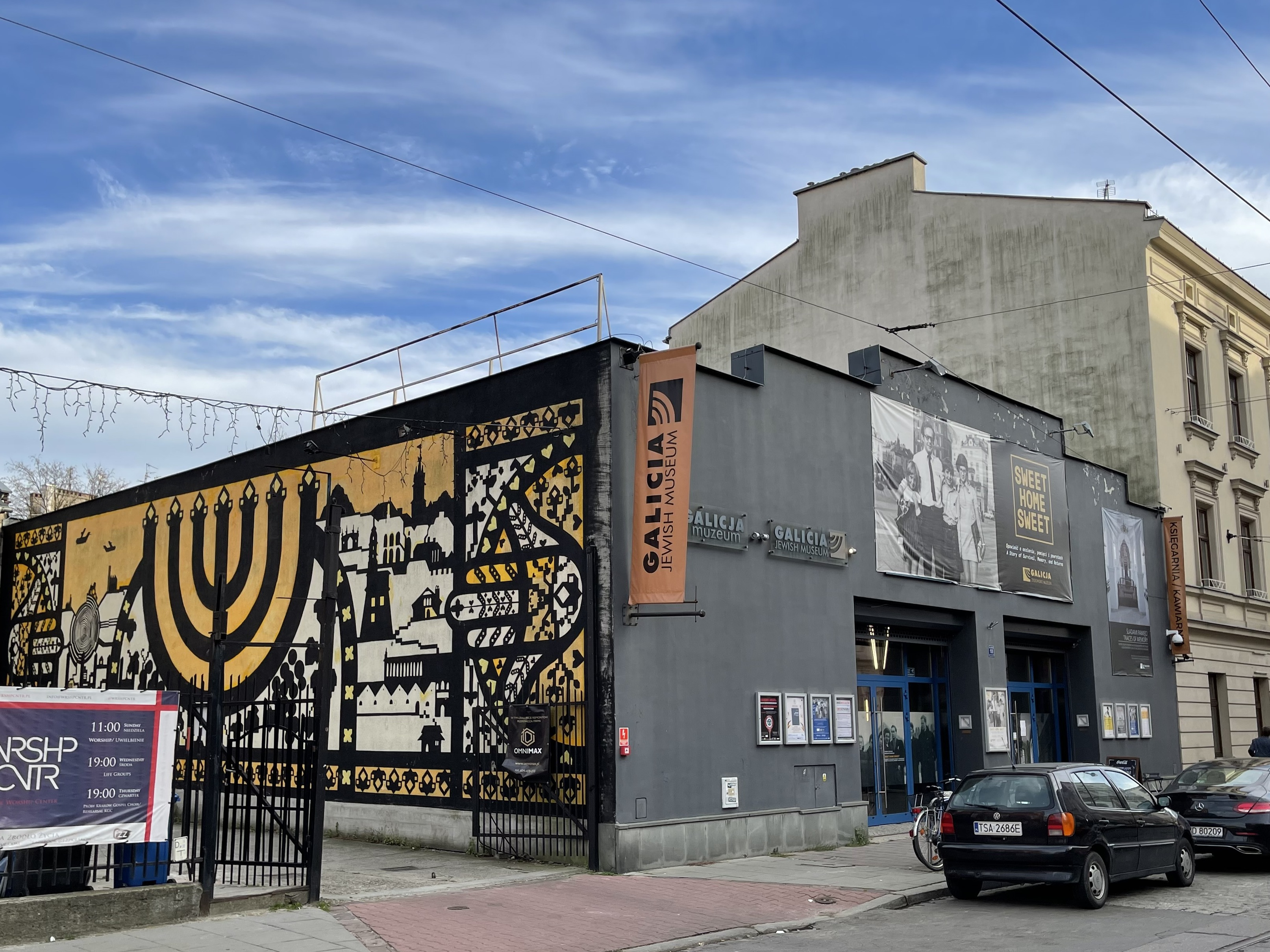
Galicia Jewish Museum
18 Dajwór Street

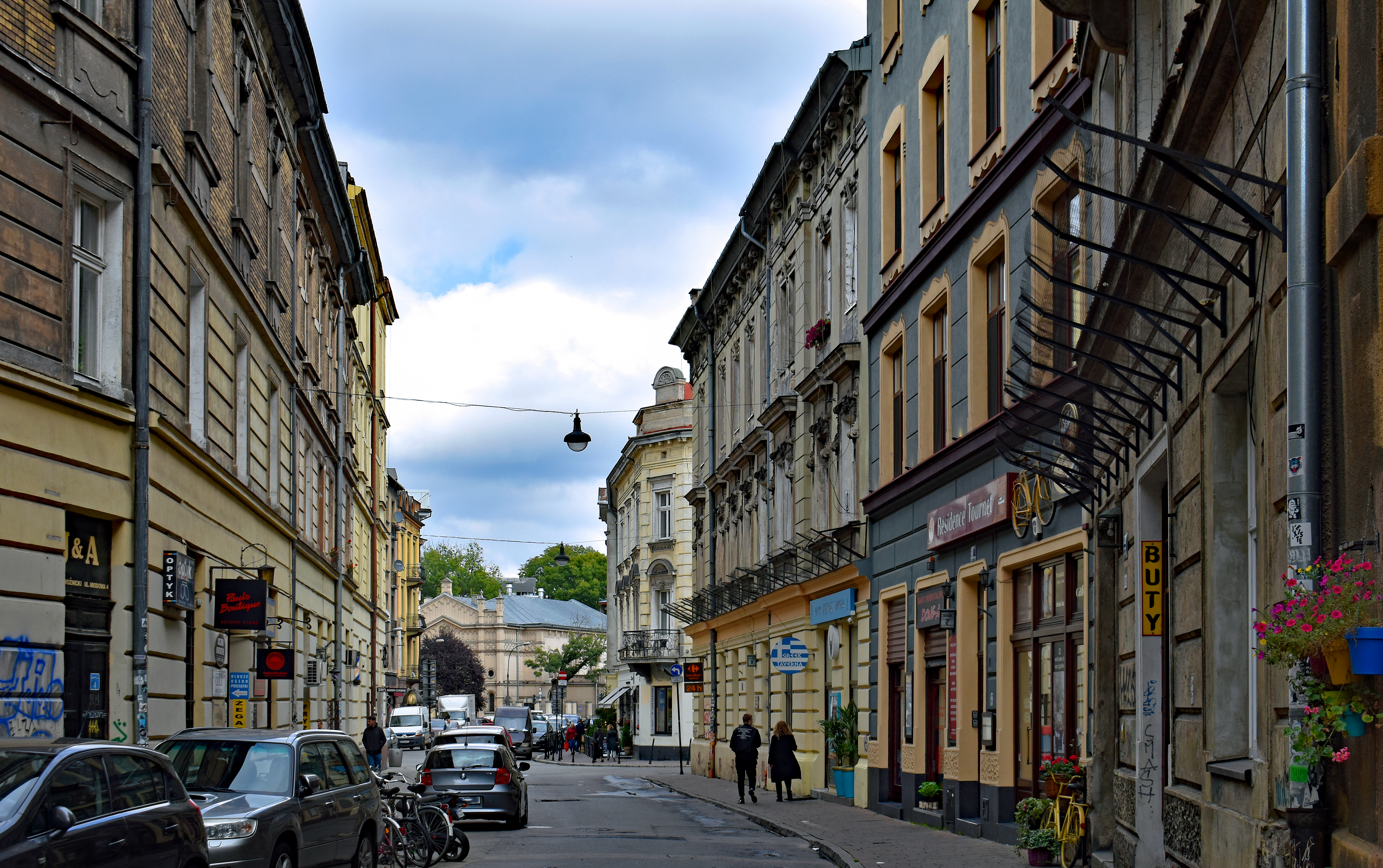
Miodowa Street

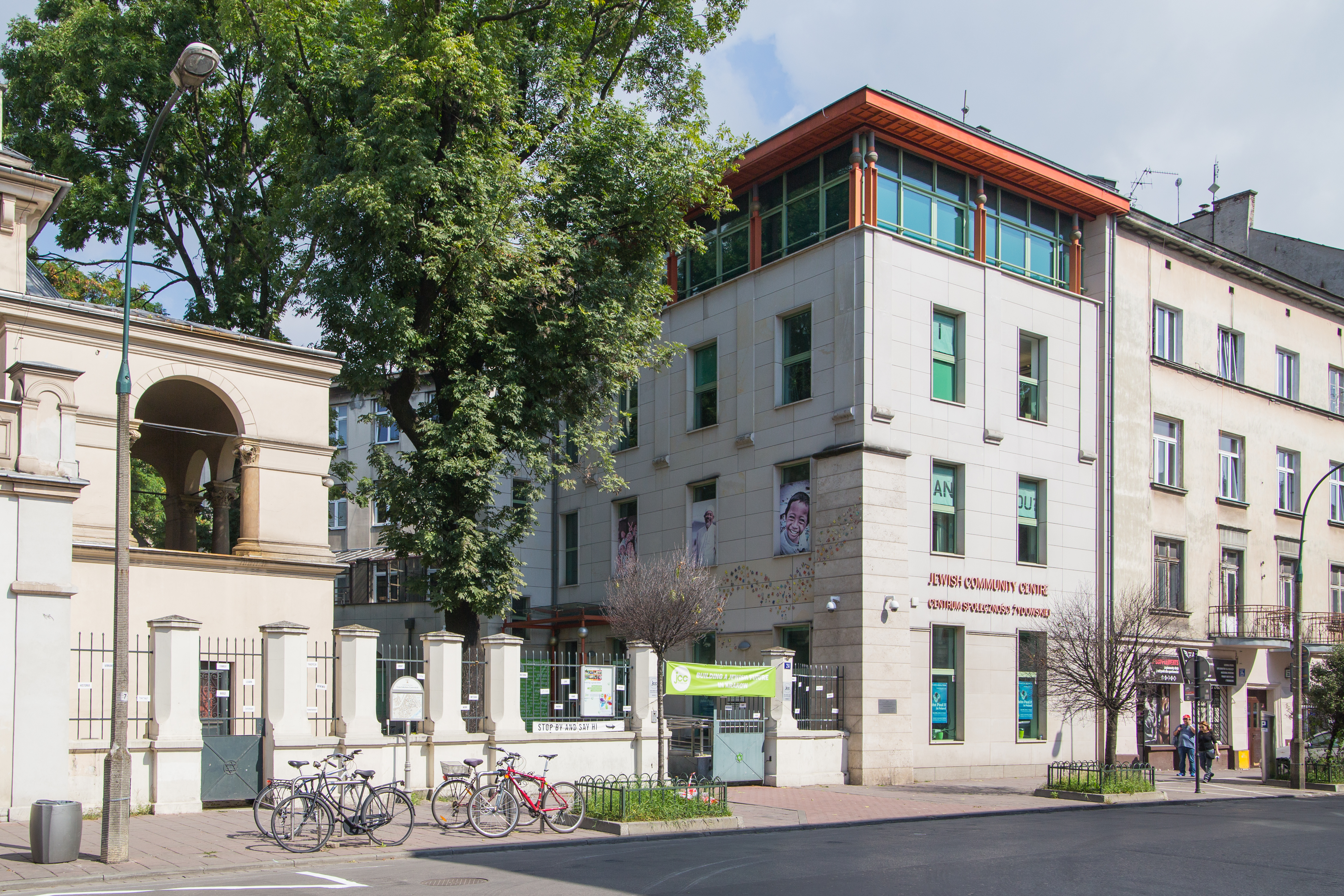
Jewish Community Centre of Krakow
24 Miodowa Street

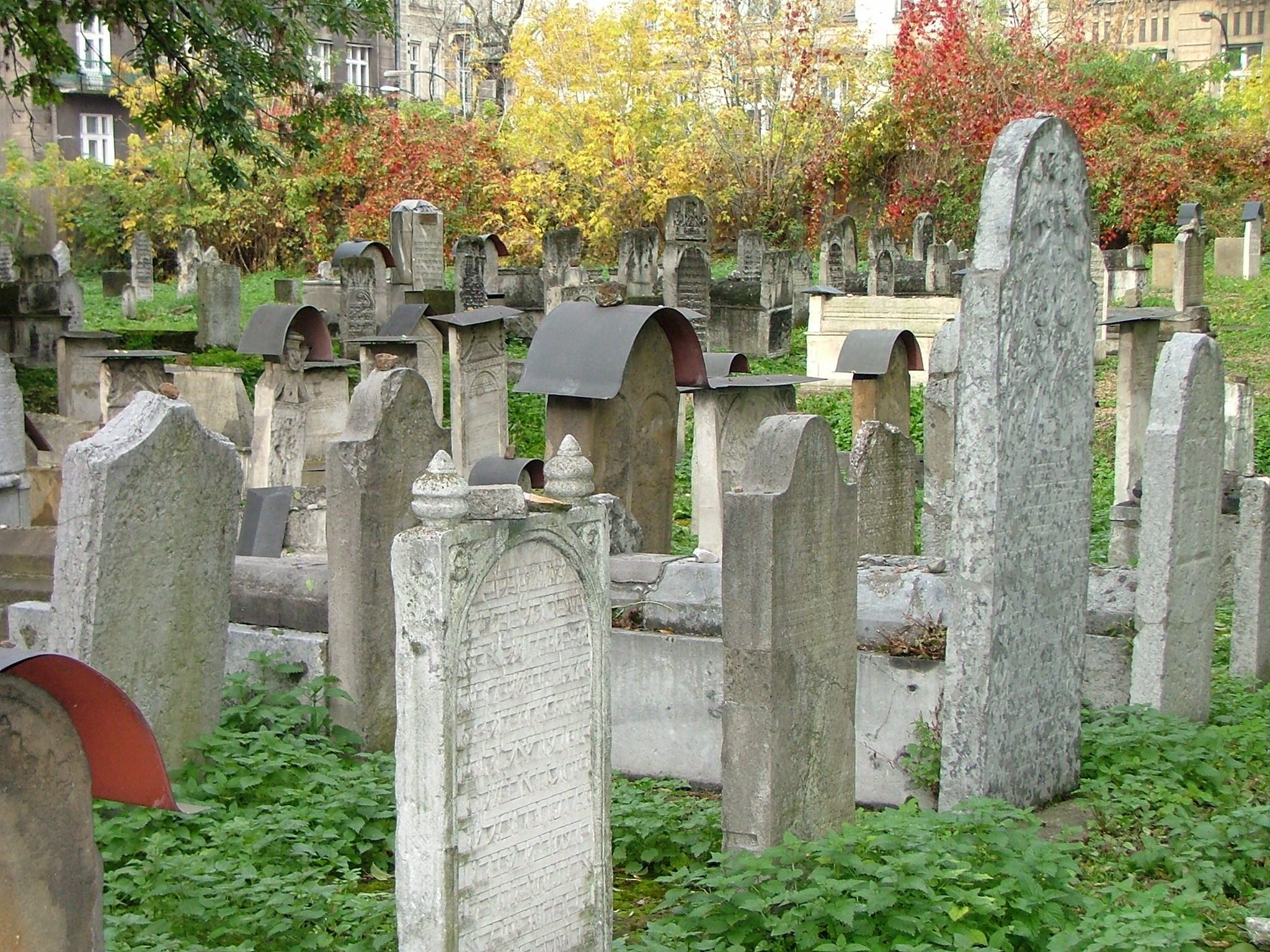
Remah Cemetery established in 1535

=== Christian part ===
See map:

1. Market Square (Wolnica) with a town hall, now housing an ethnographic museum

Kazimierz's square-shaped market square (Wolnica square) sized 195 x 195m used to be almost as large as the Krakow Market Square and served similar functions - trading activities took place there, it was town hall's location, where the highest administrative and judicial authorities of the city of Kazimierz had their seat. From each side of this square, there were leading three streets. On the corners of the square, two gothic temples were built, and both of them survived to this day in a great state. Today's Wolnica Square, half the size of the original one, gained its borders after Kazimierz was incorporated into Krakow in 1800. In its south-eastern part, there is a sculpture/fountain, Three Musicians - the work of the Krakow artist Bronisław Chromy. The only evidence of Kazimierz's former urban independence is the lofty town hall at Wolnica Square. Once gothic (relics of the 14th-century walls are preserved in the basement), it burned twice and was rebuilt each time. As a result of these changes, it gained battlement attics, rare in Krakow, and a tower covered with a modest helmet. After Kazimierz was incorporated into Krakow, the town hall lost its function. With time, it was adapted to the needs of an industrial and commercial school, and later a primary school for Jewish youth.

2. Gothic Church of St. Catherine of Alexandria and St. Margaret
3. Gothic Corpus Christi Church
4. Baroque Church of St. Michael the Archangel and St. Stanislaus Bishop and Martyr, Skałka), the site of Saint Stanislaus's martyrdom
5. Museum of Municipal Engineering

=== Jewish part ===
See map:

6. Old Synagogue, now housing a Jewish History museum
7. Remah Synagogue and Remah Cemetery
8. High Synagogue
9. Izaak Synagogue
10. Kupa Synagogue
11. Tempel Synagogue, still active

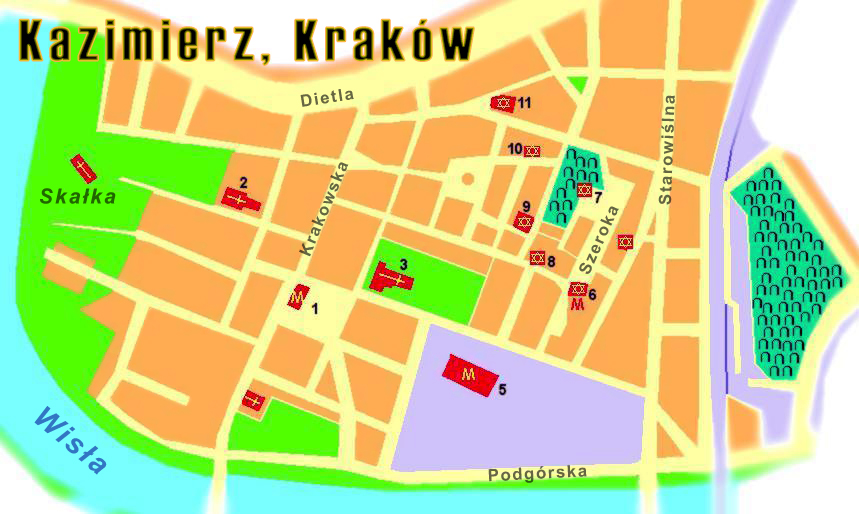
Map

== Gallery ==
=== Churches ===
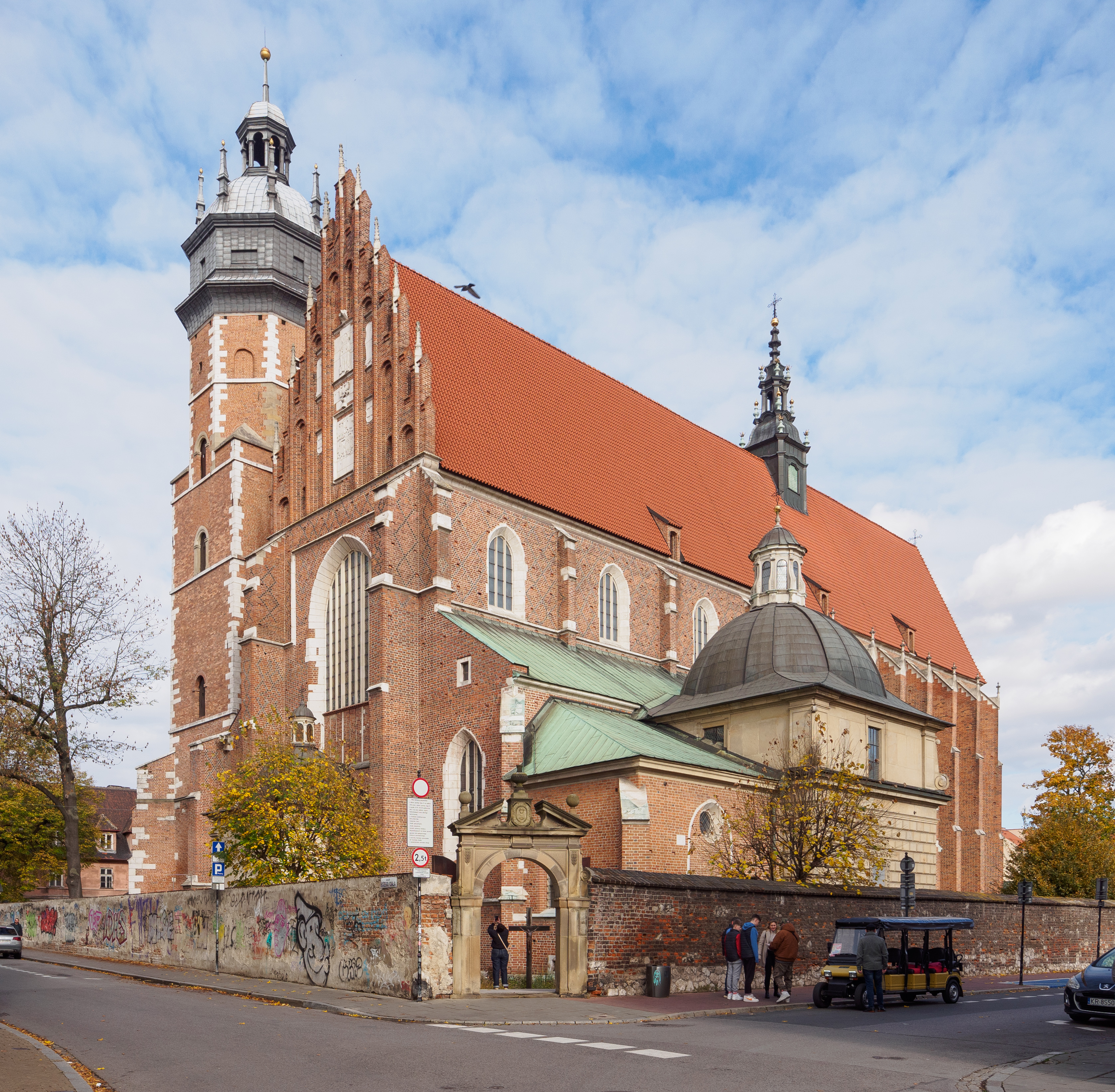
Corpus Christi Church
26 Bożego Ciała Street

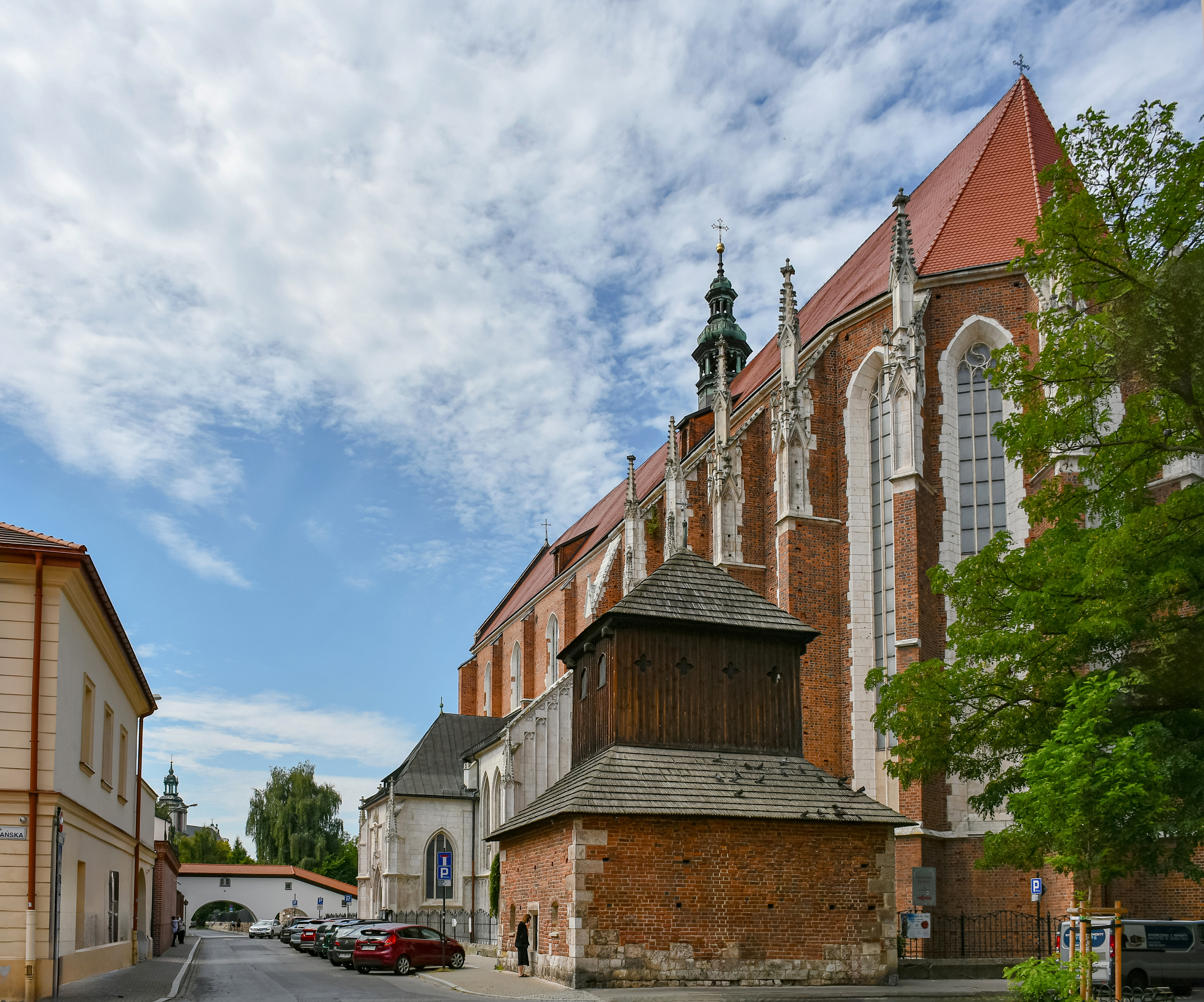
Church of St. Catherine of Alexandria and St. Margaret
7-9 Augustiańska Street

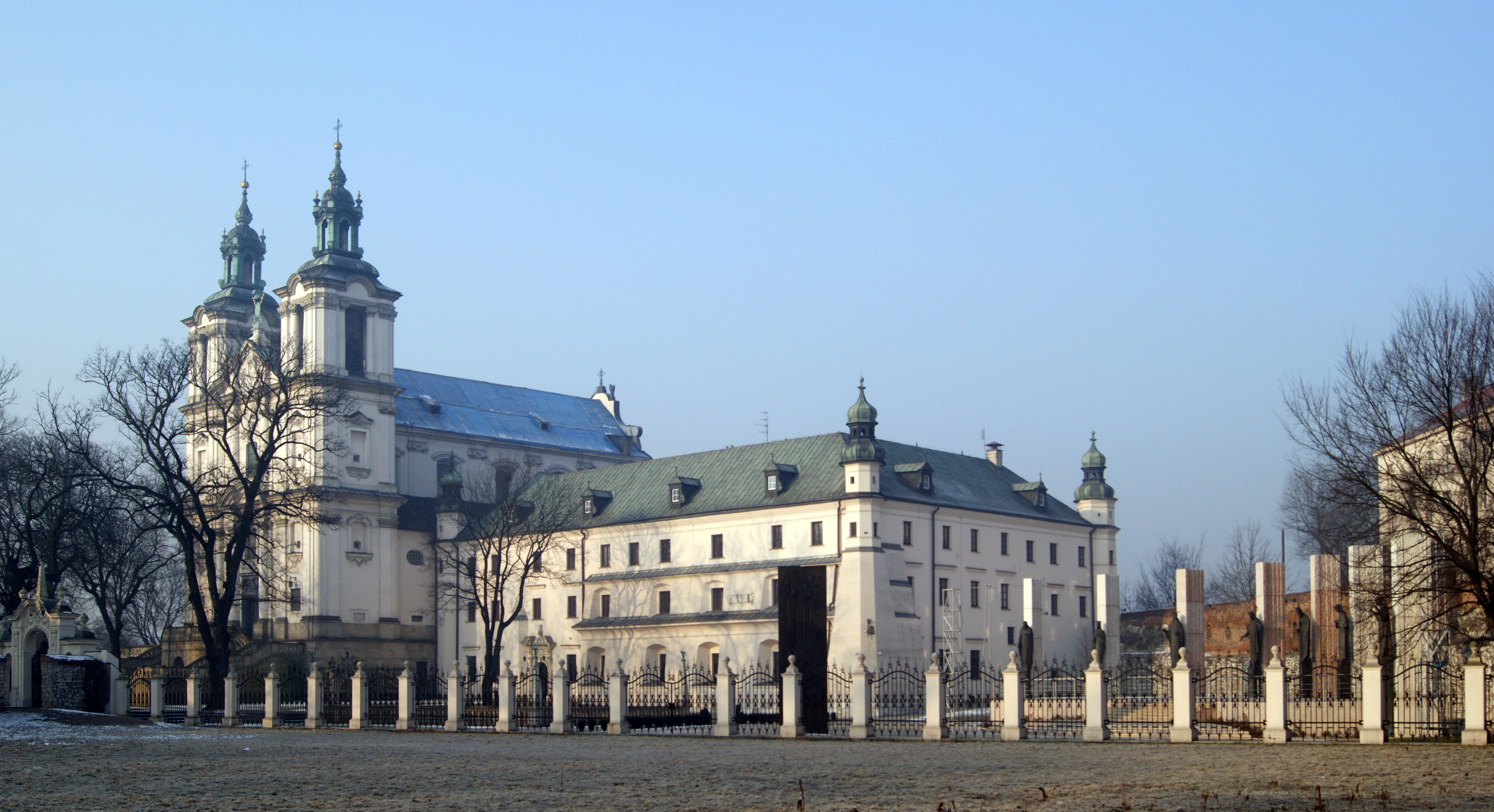
Church of St Michael the Archangel and St Stanislaus Bishop and Martyr
15 Skałeczna Street

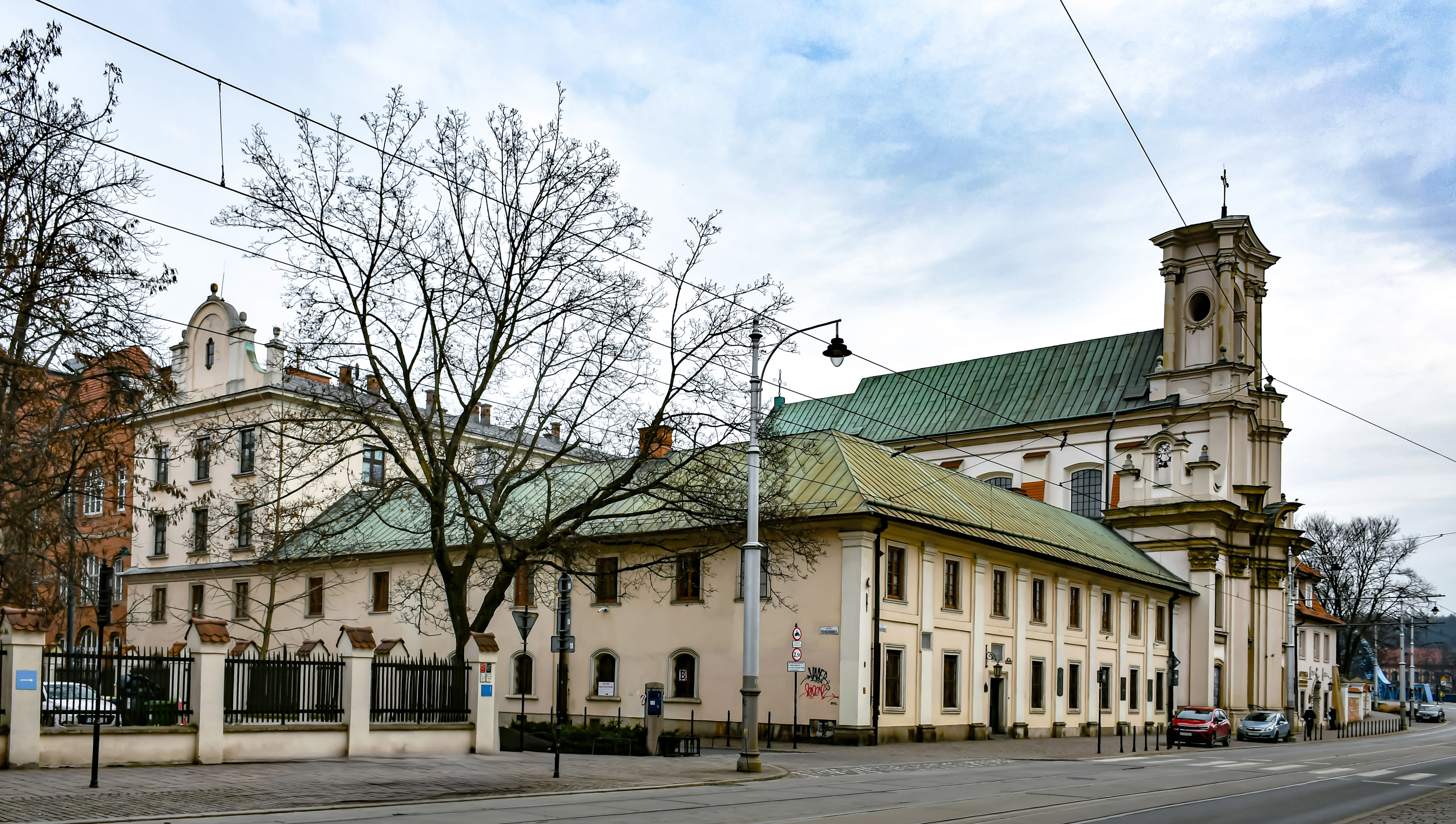
Church of the Holy Trinity
48 Krakowska Street

=== Synagogues ===
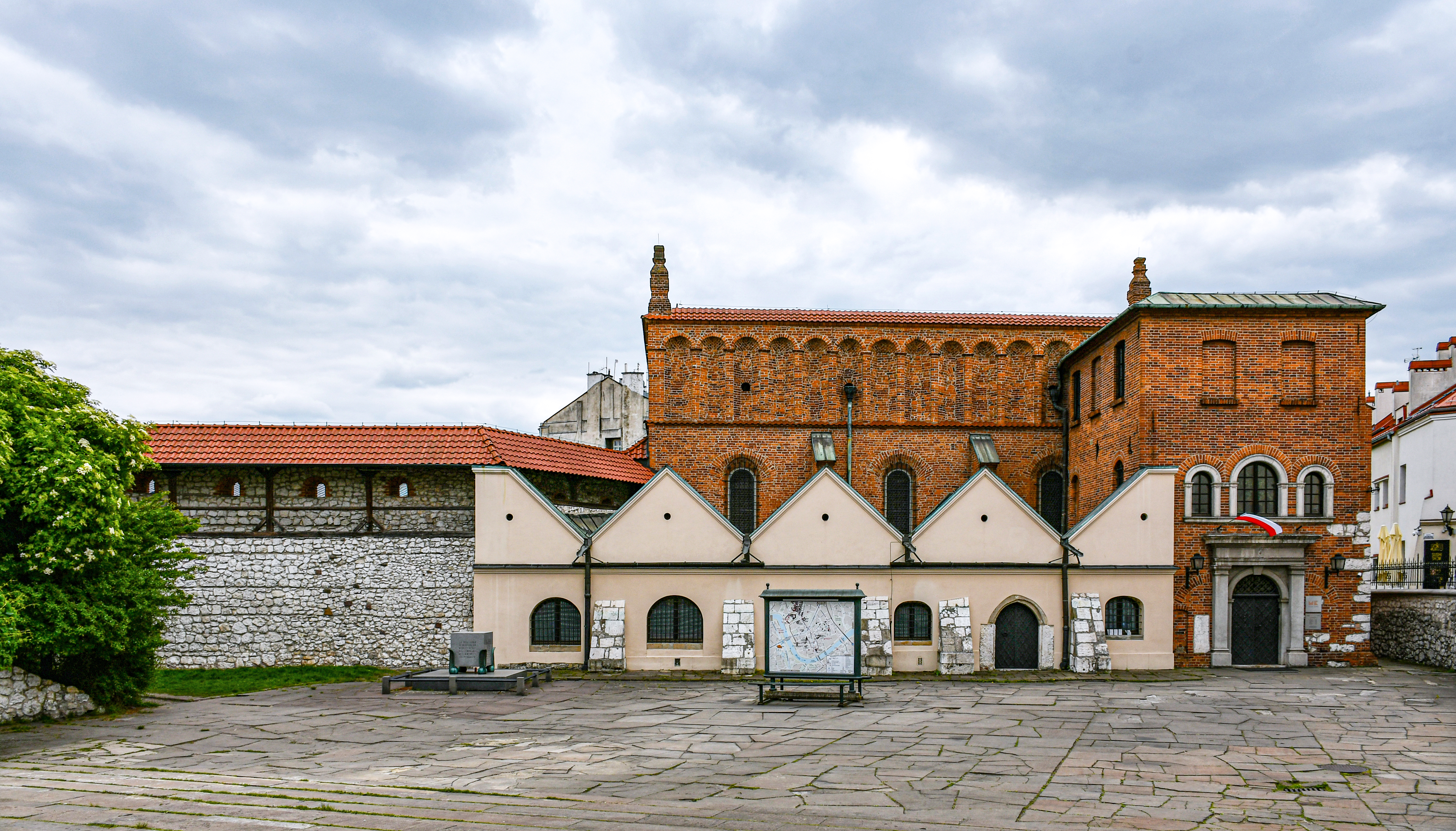
Old Synagogue
24 Szeroka Street

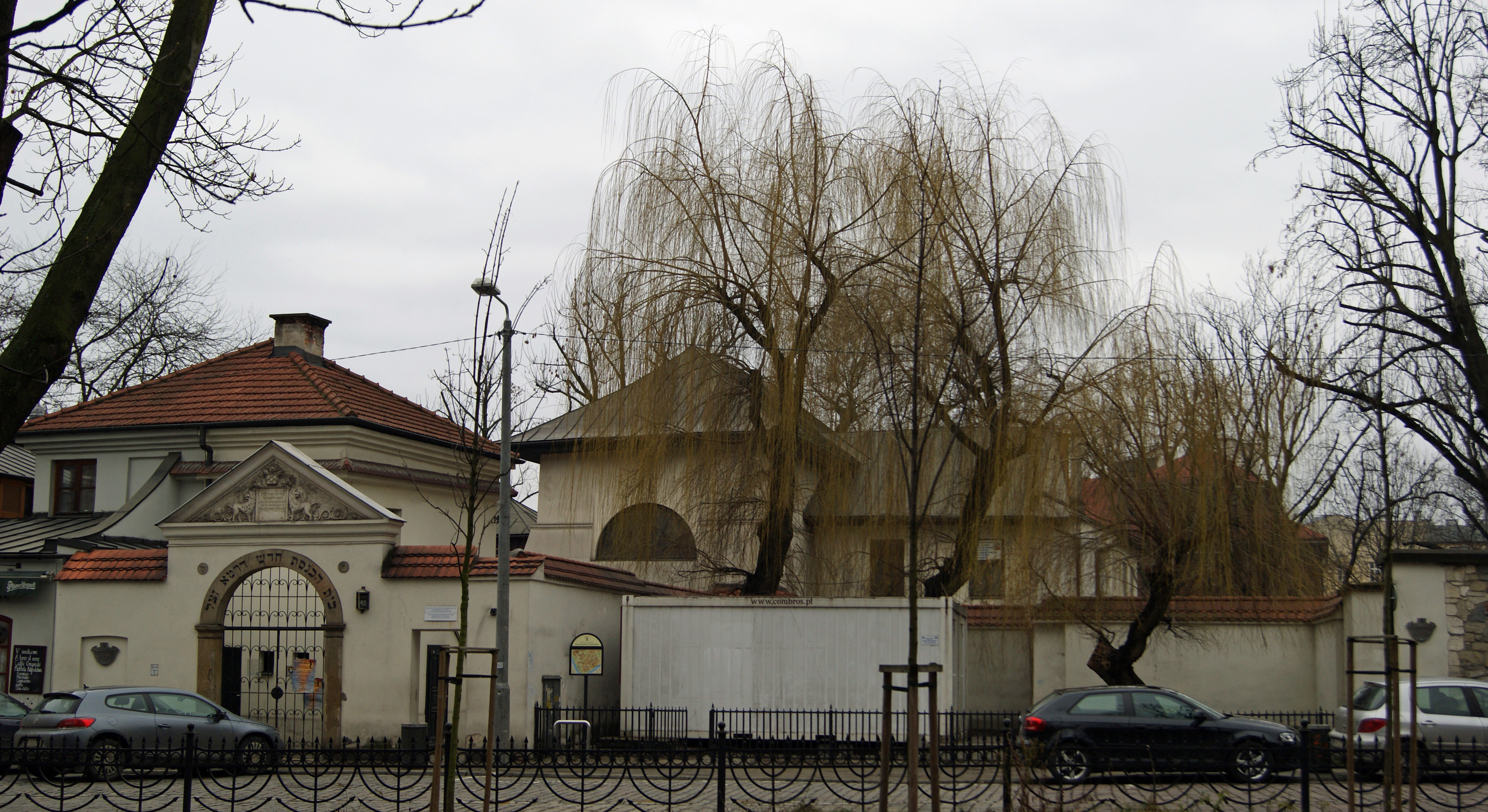
Remah Synagogue
40 Szeroka Street

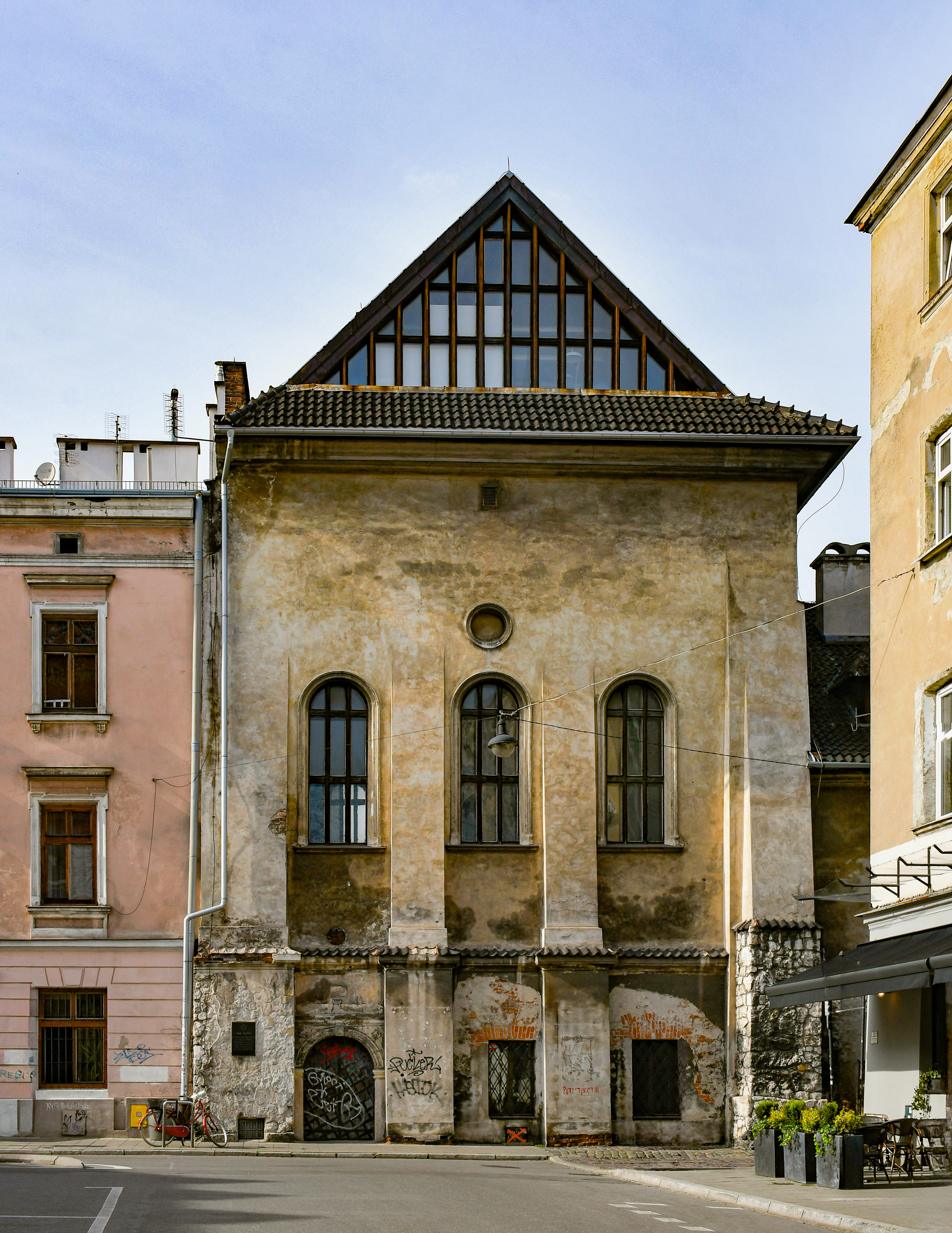
High Synagogue
38 Józefa Street

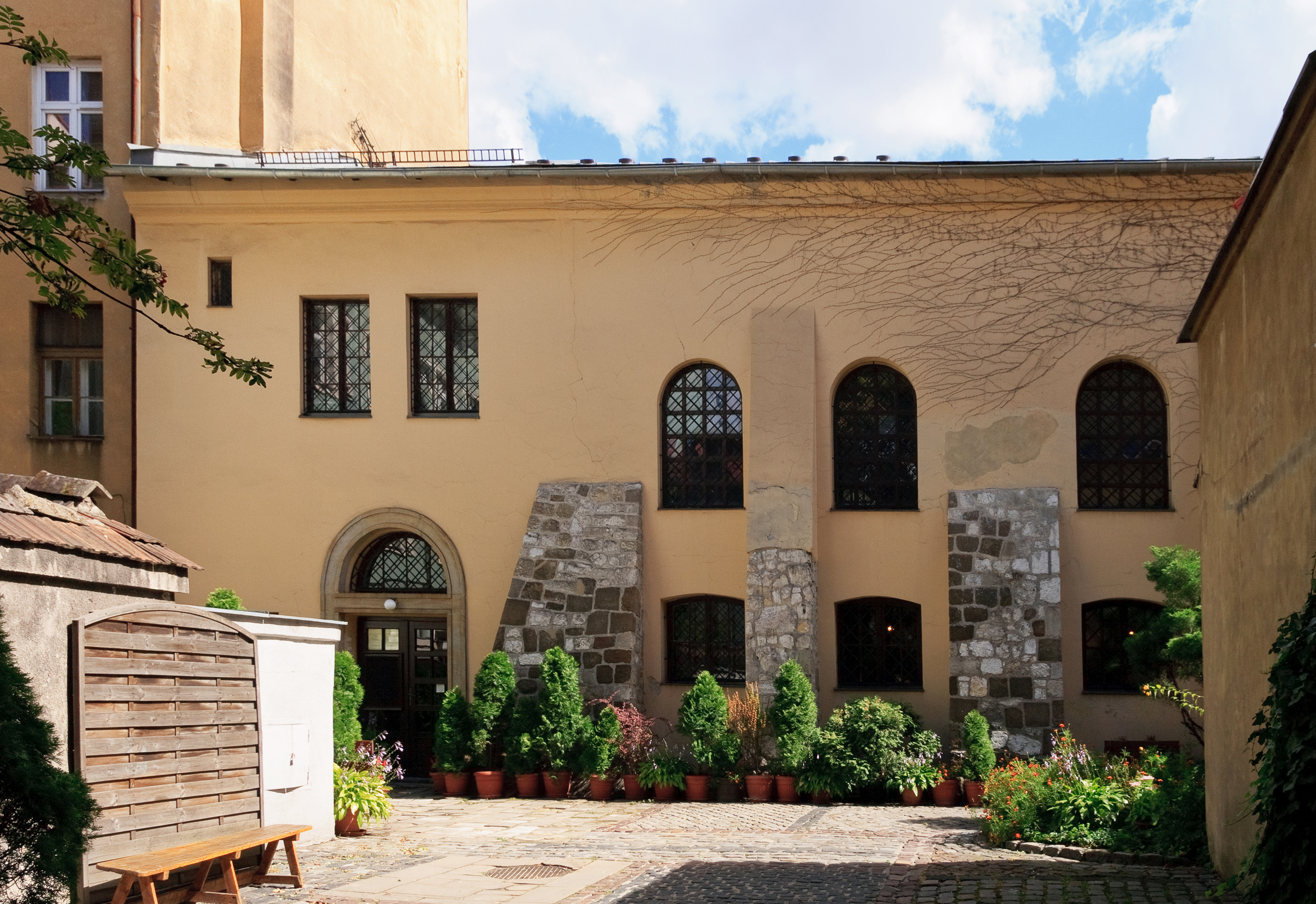
Wolf Popper Synagogue
16 Szeroka Street

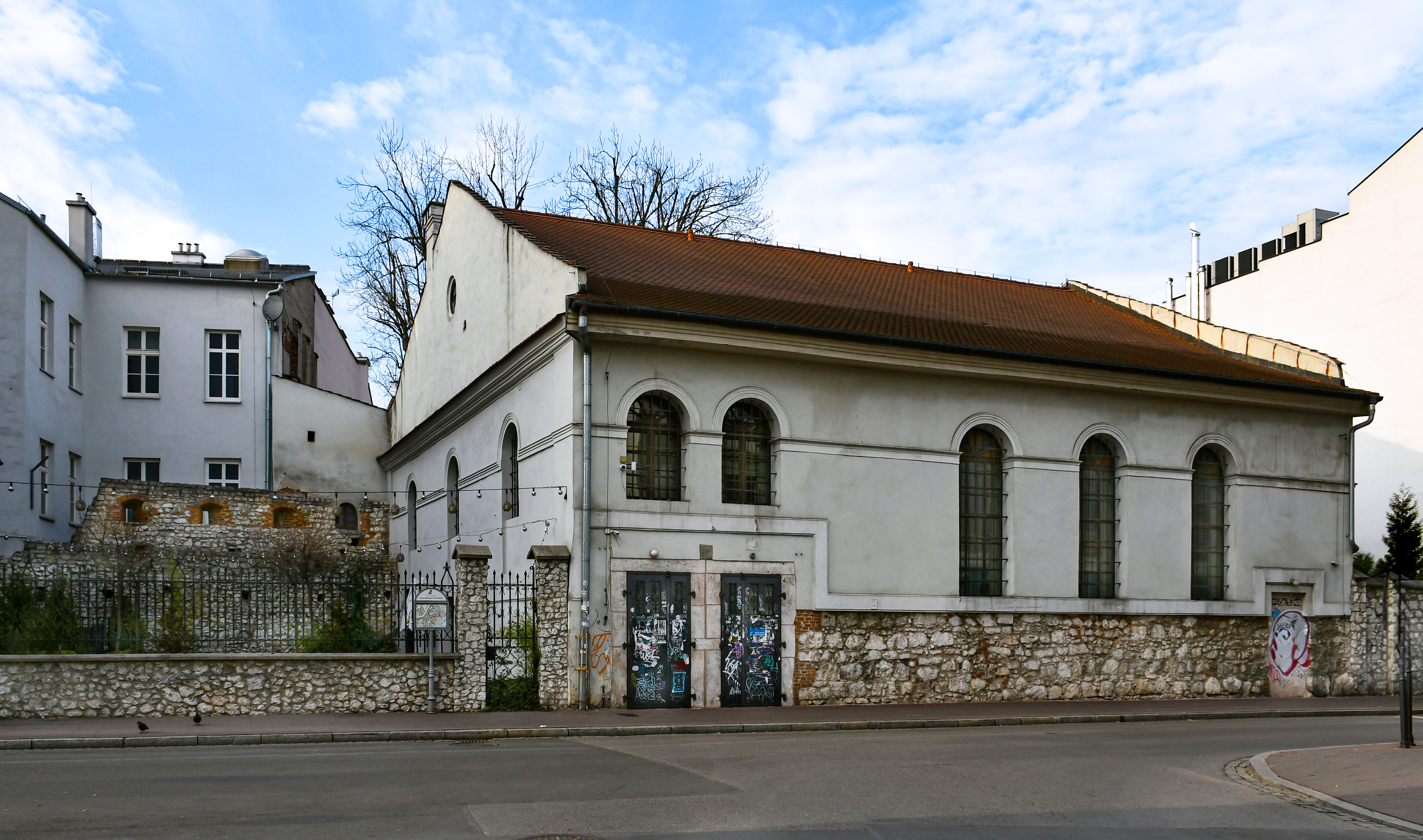
Kupa Synagogue
27 Miodowa Street

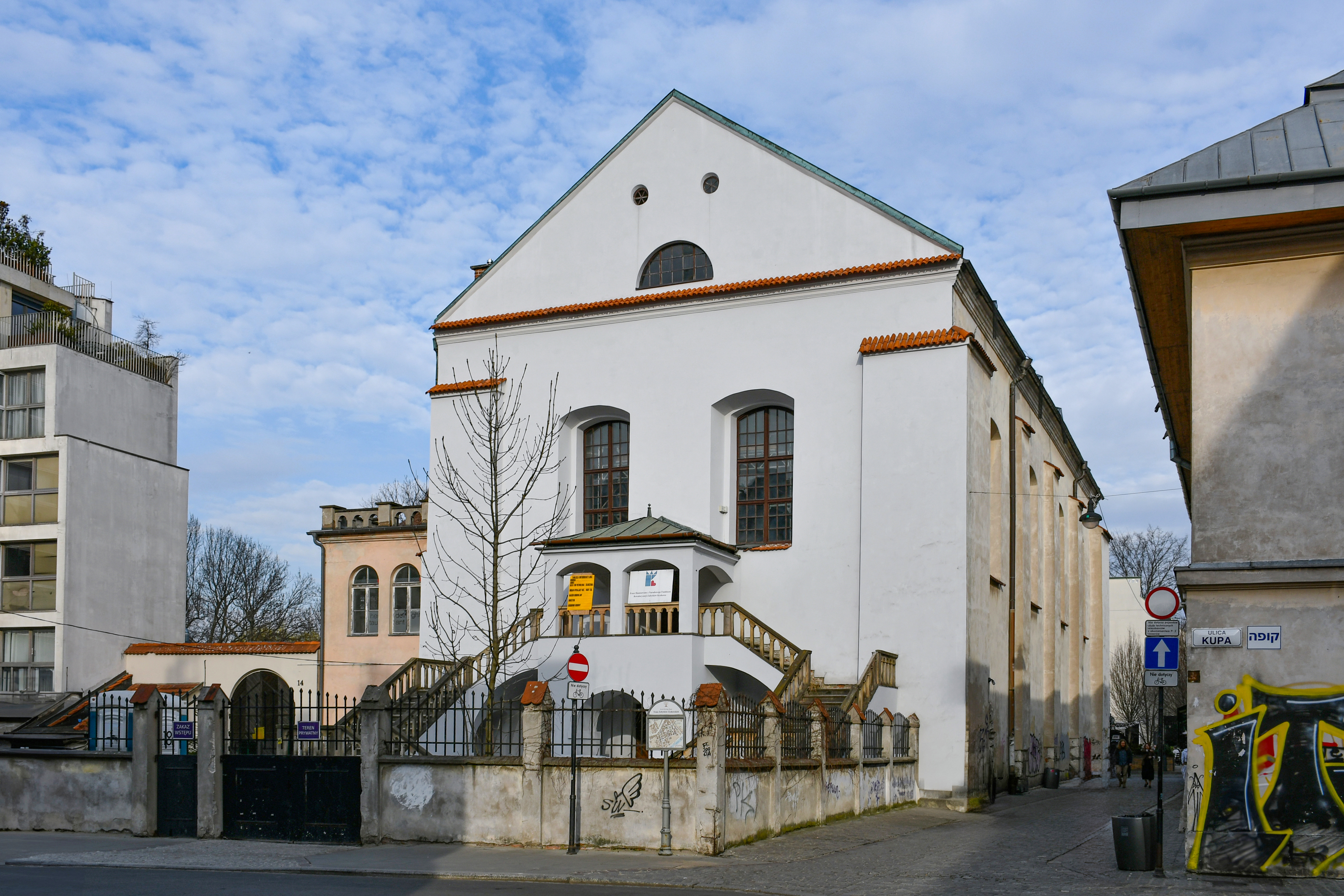
Izaak Synagogue
14 Kupa Street

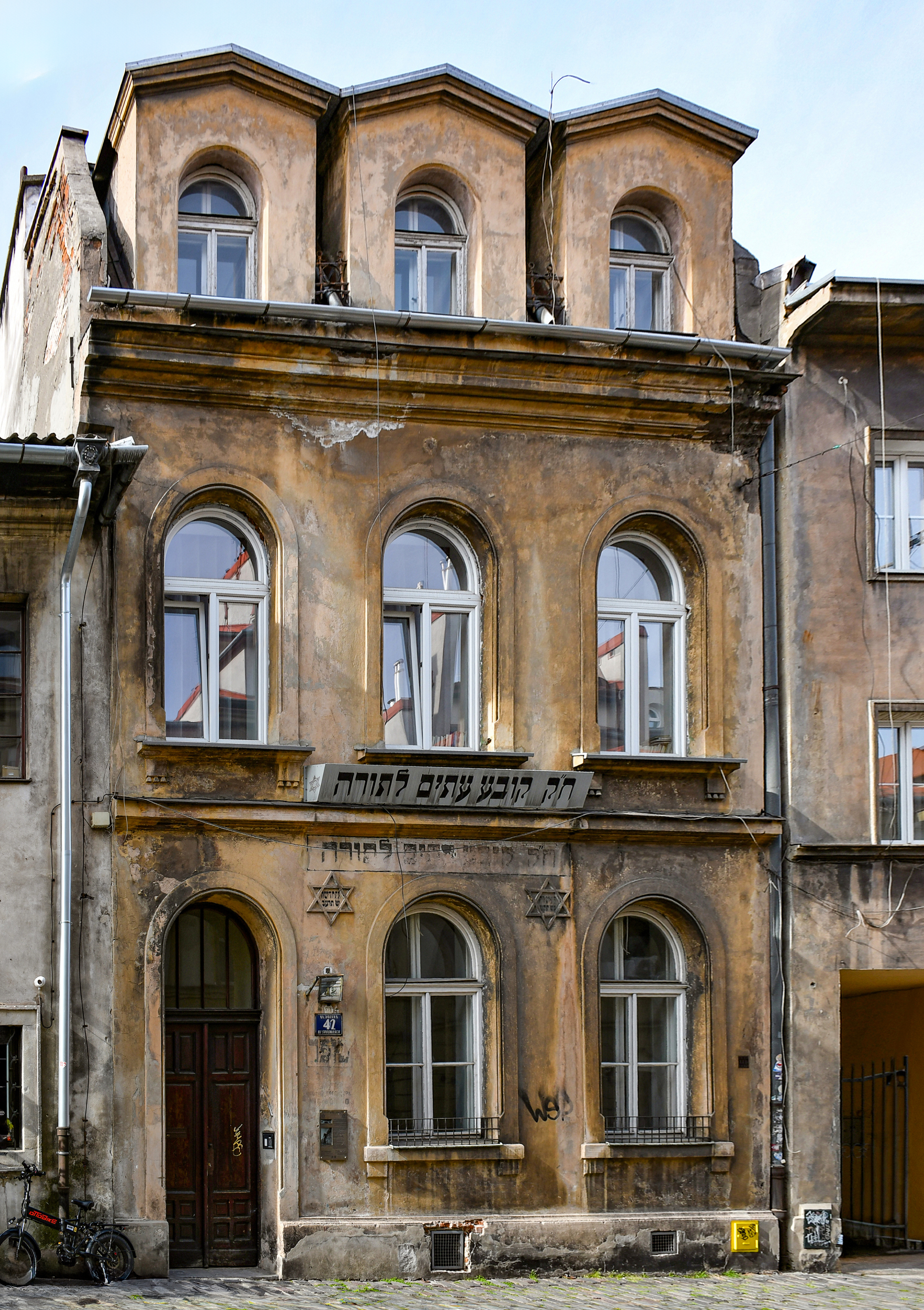
Kowea Itim le-Tora Synagogue
42 Józefa Street

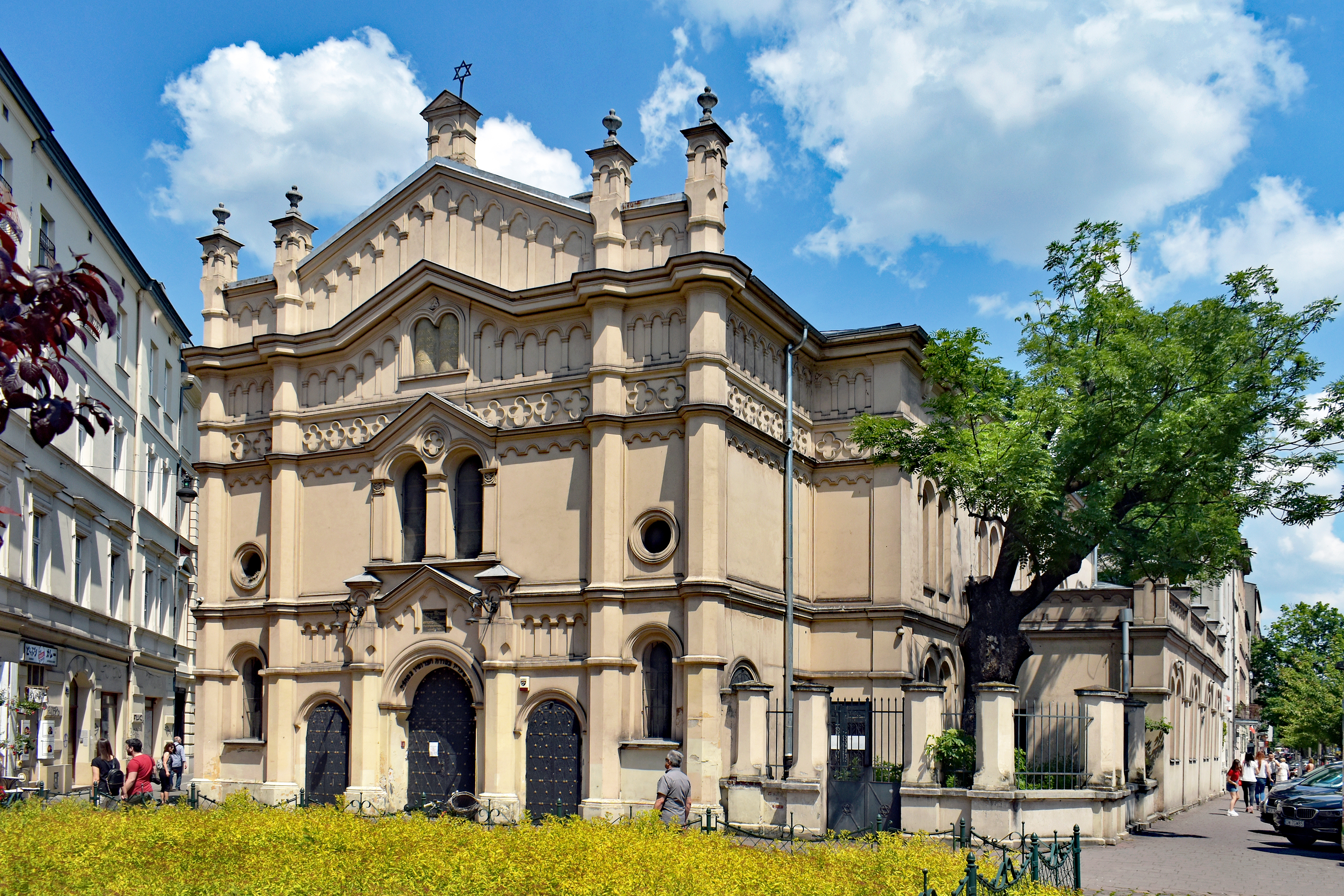
Tempel Synagogue
24 Miodowa Street

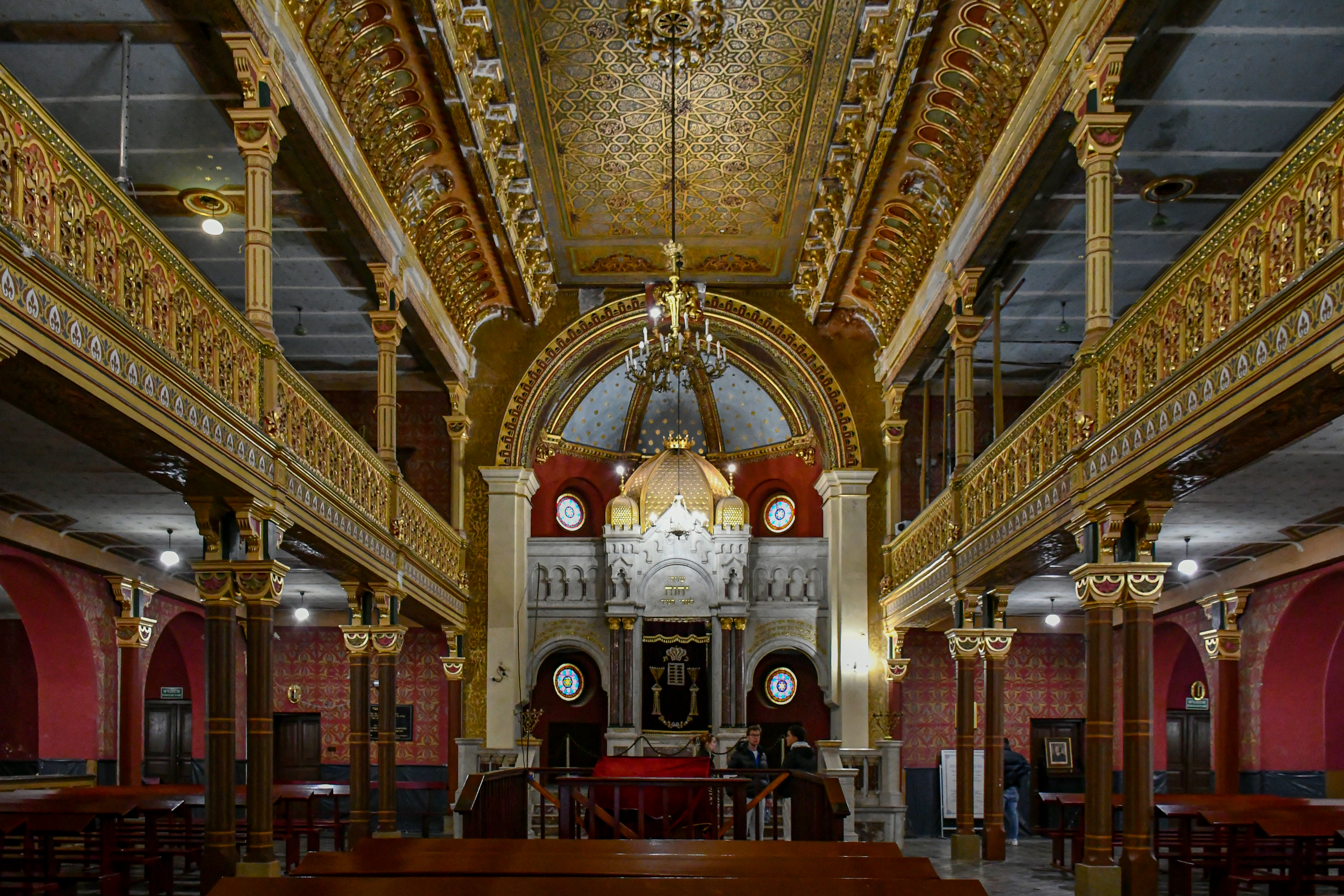
Interior of Tempel Synagogue

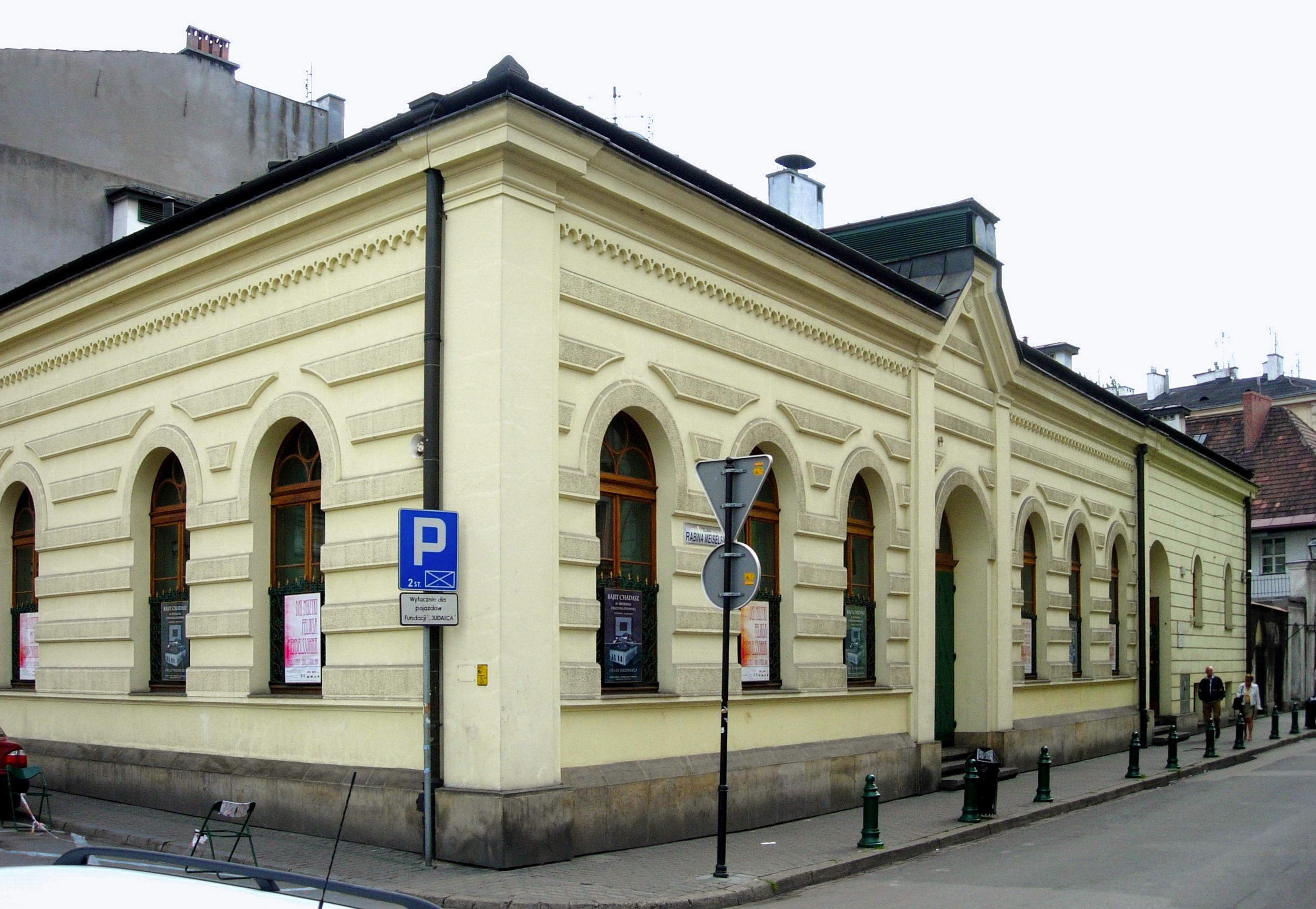
Bne Emuna Prayerhouse. Today the Judaica Foundation - Center For Jewish Culture
17 Beer Meisels Street

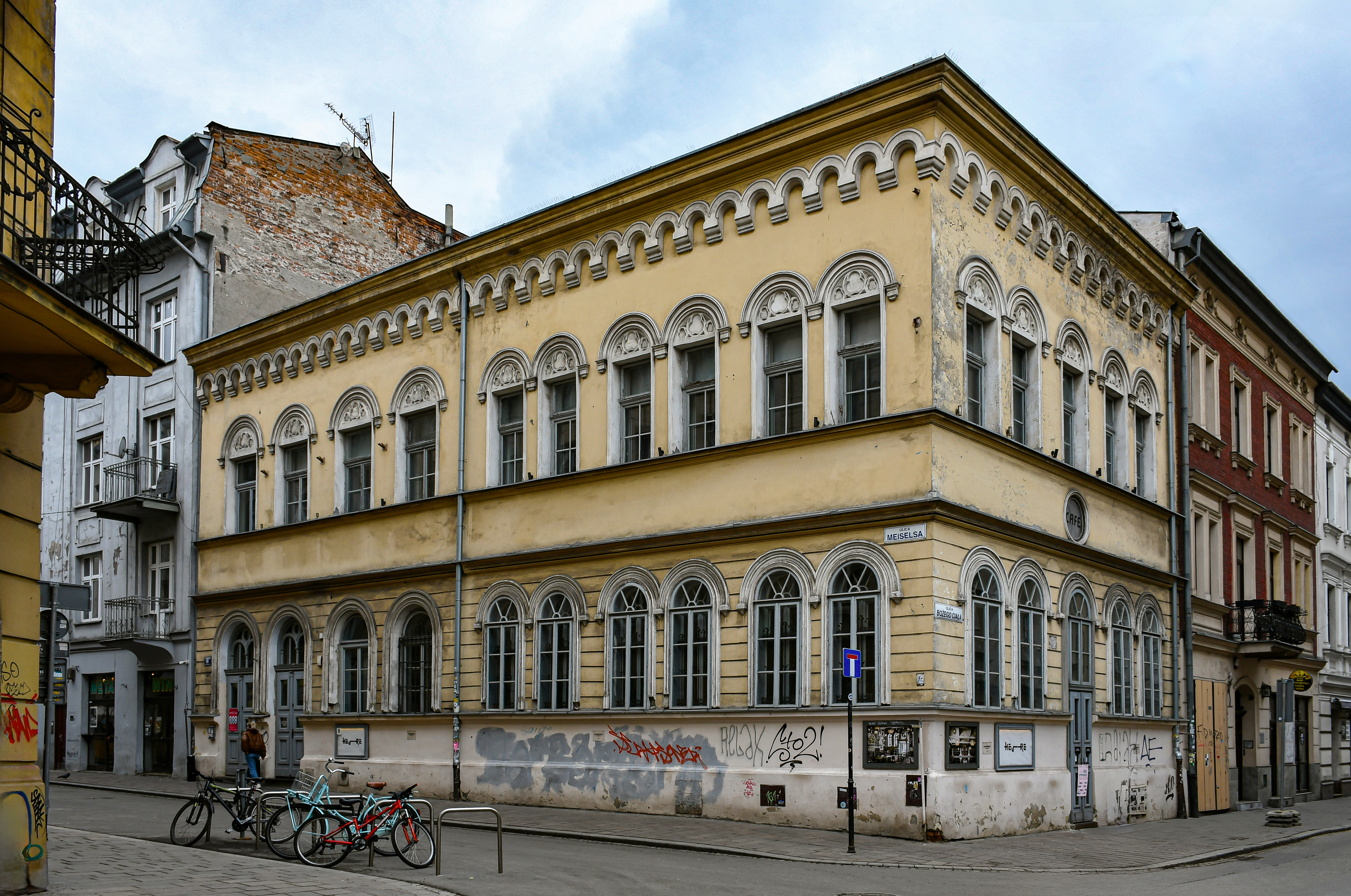
Hevre Tehilim Synagogue.
18 Beer Meisels Street

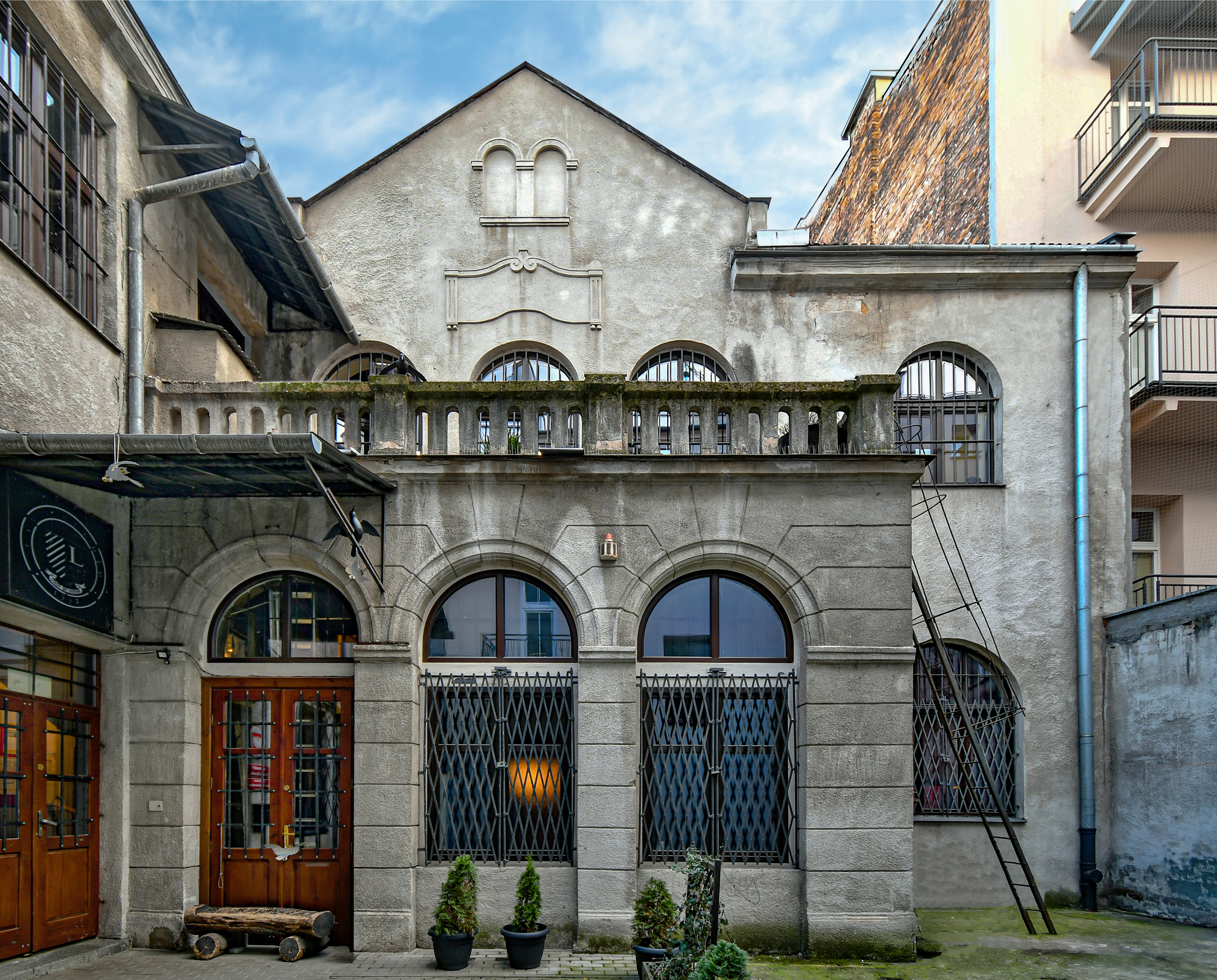
Solomon Deiches Synagogue.
6a Brzozowa Street

== See also ==
- Synagogues of Kraków
- Kraków Ghetto
- Galicia Jewish Museum
- Jewish Community Centre of Krakow
- Jewish Culture Festival in Kraków
- Judaica Foundation – Center For Jewish Culture
- Old Jewish Cemetery in Kraków
- New Jewish Cemetery, Kraków
