= Synagogues of Kraków =

Jewish sacred architeture in Poland

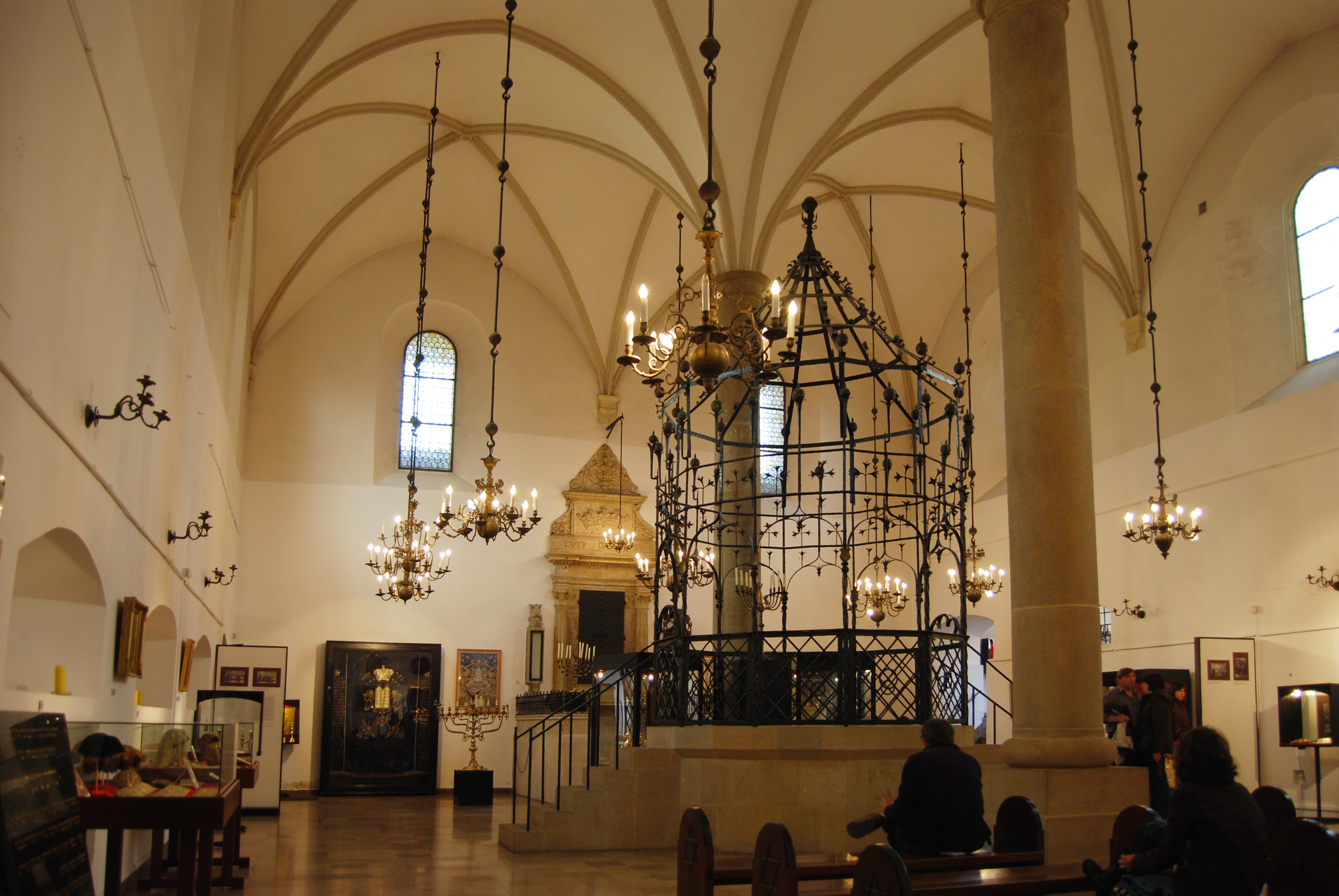
Interior view of Old Synagogue, Kraków, Poland

The synagogues of Kraków are a collection of monuments of Jewish sacred architecture in Poland. The seven main synagogues of the Jewish District of Kazimierz constitute the largest such complex in Europe next to Prague. These are:

1. The Old Synagogue
2. Wolf Popper Synagogue
3. Remah Synagogue
4. High Synagogue
5. Izaak Synagogue
6. Temple Synagogue
7. Kupa Synagogue

Two other houses of prayer, both from the 19th century, could be classed as synagogues, both of them on Meiselsa street: the B'nea Emun prayer house and the Hevre Tehillim, psalm brotherhood house of prayer.

It was put on the list of UNESCO world heritage sites along with the entire city district in 1978.

== History ==
Kraków was an influential centre of Jewish spiritual life before the outbreak of World War II, with all its manifestations of religious observance from Orthodox, to Chasidic and Reform flourishing side by side. There were at least ninety prayer-houses in Kraków active before the Nazi German invasion of Poland, serving its burgeoning Jewish community of 60,000–80,000 (out of the city's total population of 237,000), established since the early 12th century.

Most synagogues of Kraków were ruined during World War II by the Nazis who despoiled them of all ceremonial objects, and used them as storehouses for ammunition, firefighting equipment, and as general storage facilities. The post-Holocaust Jewish population of the city had dwindled to about 5,900 before the end of the 1940s, and by 1978, the number was further reduced in size to a mere 600 by some estimates.

In recent time, thanks to the efforts of the local Jewish and Polish organizations including foreign financial aid from Akiva Kahane, many synagogues and prayer-houses underwent major restorations, while others continue to serve as apartments.

== Main synagogues ==
The synagogues of Kraków represent virtually all European architectural styles of the past millennium, including Gothic, Renaissance, Baroque, Neoclassicism and Modernism. Among the most prominent are: the Old Synagogue, the High Synagogue, Remah Synagogue, Wolf Popper Synagogue, Tempel Synagogue, Kupa Synagogue and the Izaak Jakubowicz Synagogue. At present, only two of them are still active, and only one serves as a house of prayer, the Remuh Synagogue.

=== The Jewish History Museum ===
The Old Synagogue on Szeroka Street, is the oldest Jewish house of prayer in Poland, built in 1407. Nowadays, the synagogue serves as the Jewish History Museum, a Division of the Historical Museum of Kraków. The exhibits are divided into four sections: synagogue furnishings and paraphernalia, Jewish rituals and festivals, the history of Kazimierz District, and the Holocaust. The museum features numerous items related to religious ceremonies, for example, candle holders, Chanukah and menorot lamps, covers for the Torah, parochot Holy Ark covers, tallit prayer shawls, and kippahs or yarmulkes. The museum holds also a considerable collection of books including 2,500 volumes of Hebrew manuscripts and prints. On the walls, there are original oil paintings on display made by Maurycy Gottlieb, Józef Mehoffer, Tadeusz Popiel, Jerzy Potrzebowski and Jonasz Stern.

=== The Remah Synagogue ===
The Remah Synagogue (Hebrew: רמ״א) on the west side of Szeroka, is one of the few functioning synagogues in the city, built along the old row houses (kamienice). It was founded in 1556 by a royal banker, Izrael (Isserl) son of Joseph, for his own son the rabbi Moses Isserles also known as Remah. There are also a Remah Cemetery named after him, and the mikvah (ritual bath). Located further down on Szeroka Street is a bookshop that was formerly the Synagogue of Wolf Popper, the father of Joachim Edler von Popper.

=== The High Synagogue ===
The High Synagogue on Jozefa Street was built in 1556–1563 in a Romanesque style, and the Kupa Synagogue, founded in 1643 by the Jewish district's kehilla (a municipal self-government) as foundation for the local kahal. The Isaak Jakubowicz Synagogue built in 1644, is located on Kupa Street. Currently it houses Kraków's Chabad Lubavitch community. The Tempel Synagogue on Miodowa Street, was designed in the 1860s, on the pattern of the Leopoldstädter Tempel in Vienna, at a time when Kraków was part of the Austro-Hungarian Empire. Right after World War II a mikvah (ritual bath) was built at the side of the Tempel Synagogue, as the Remah Synagogue's mikvah was no longer able to serve. The mikvah at the Tempel Synagogue is for men only. On Józefa Street, there is the Kowea Itim le-Tora House of Prayer established in 1810. It was once owned by the Society for the Study of the Torah.

=== Active synagogues ===
- Remah Synagogue
- Izaak Jakubowicz Synagogue
- Tempel Synagogue

=== Inactive synagogues ===
- Bobov Synagogue (Kraków)
- Old Synagogue, now housing a Jewish History museum
- Wolf Popper Synagogue
- High Synagogue

== Gallery ==
=== Synagogues in Kazimierz ===
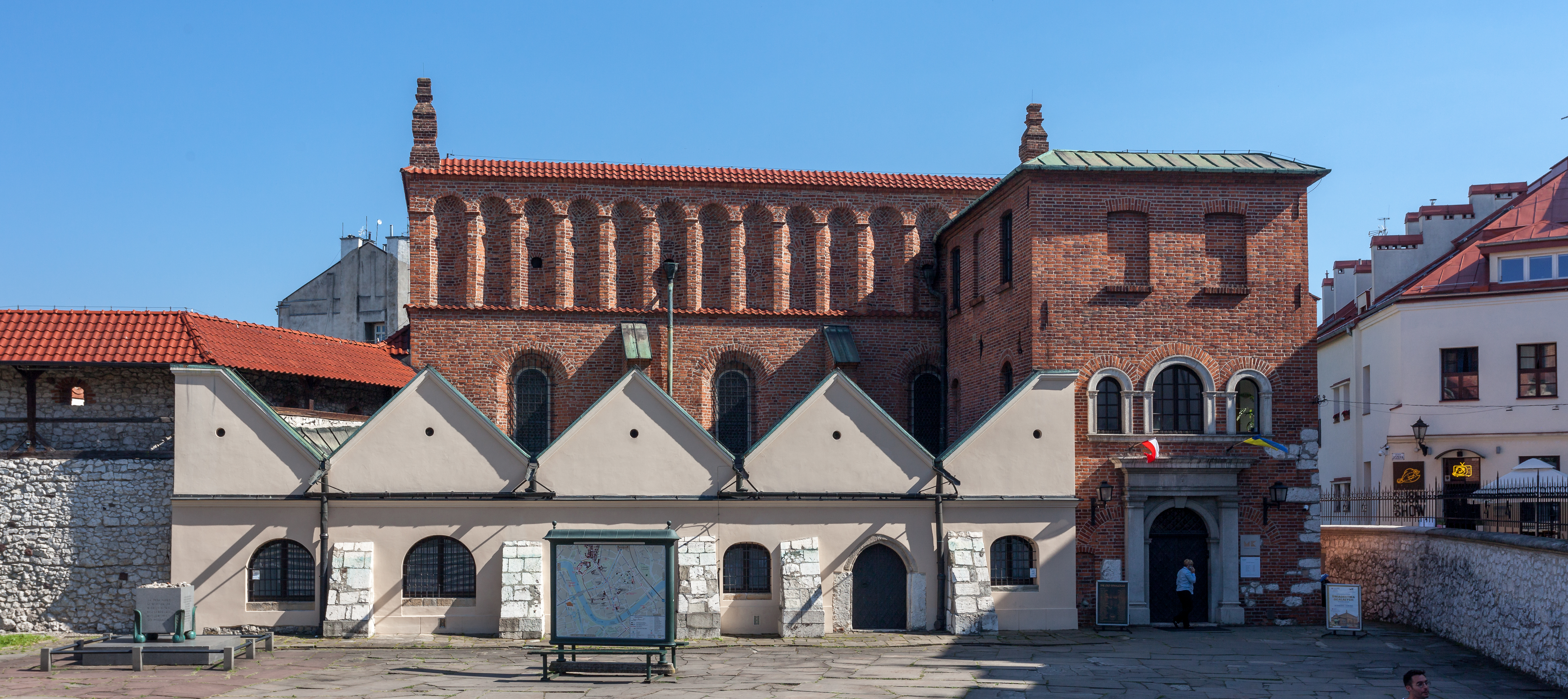
Old Synagogue
24 Szeroka Street

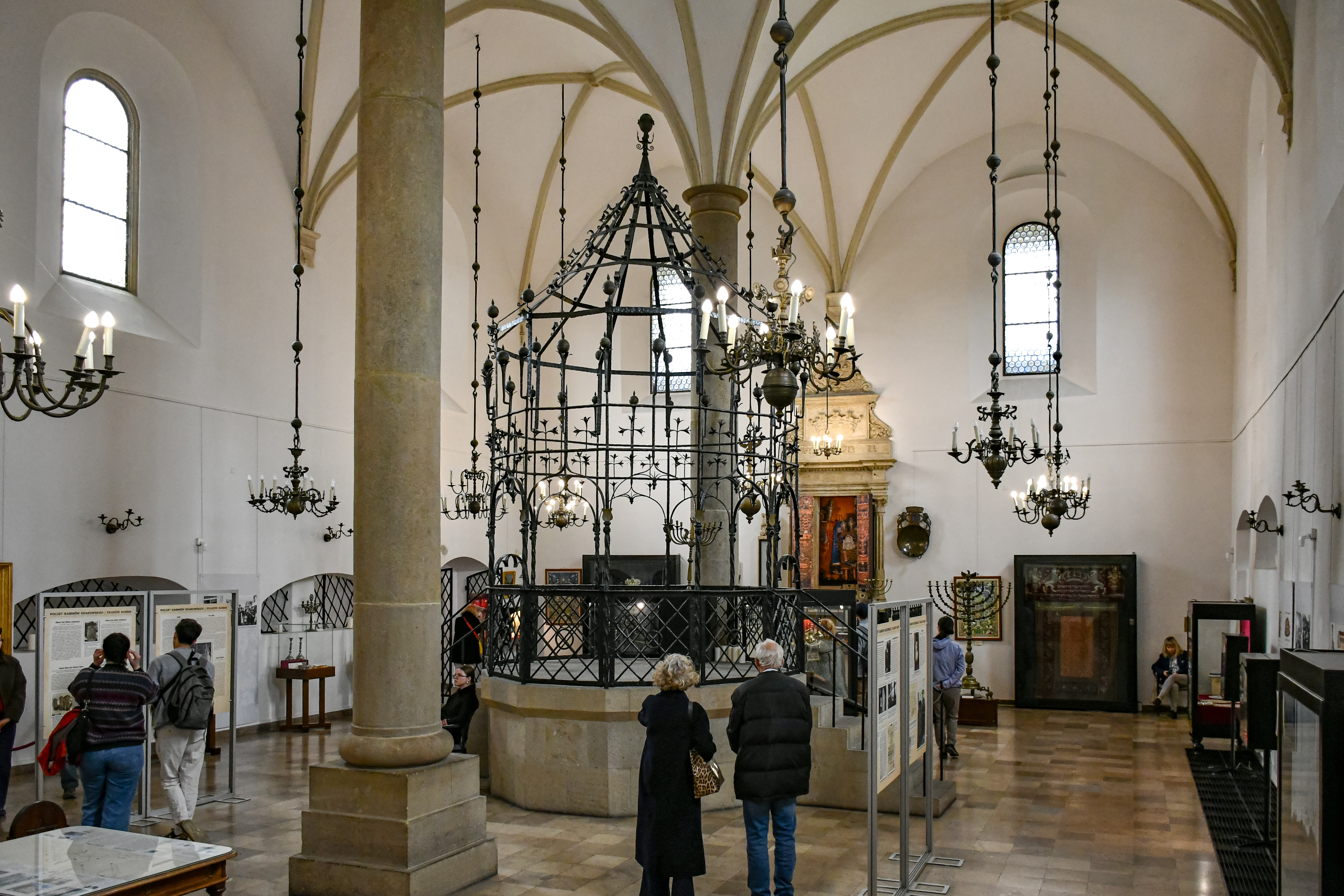
Old Synagogue, interior

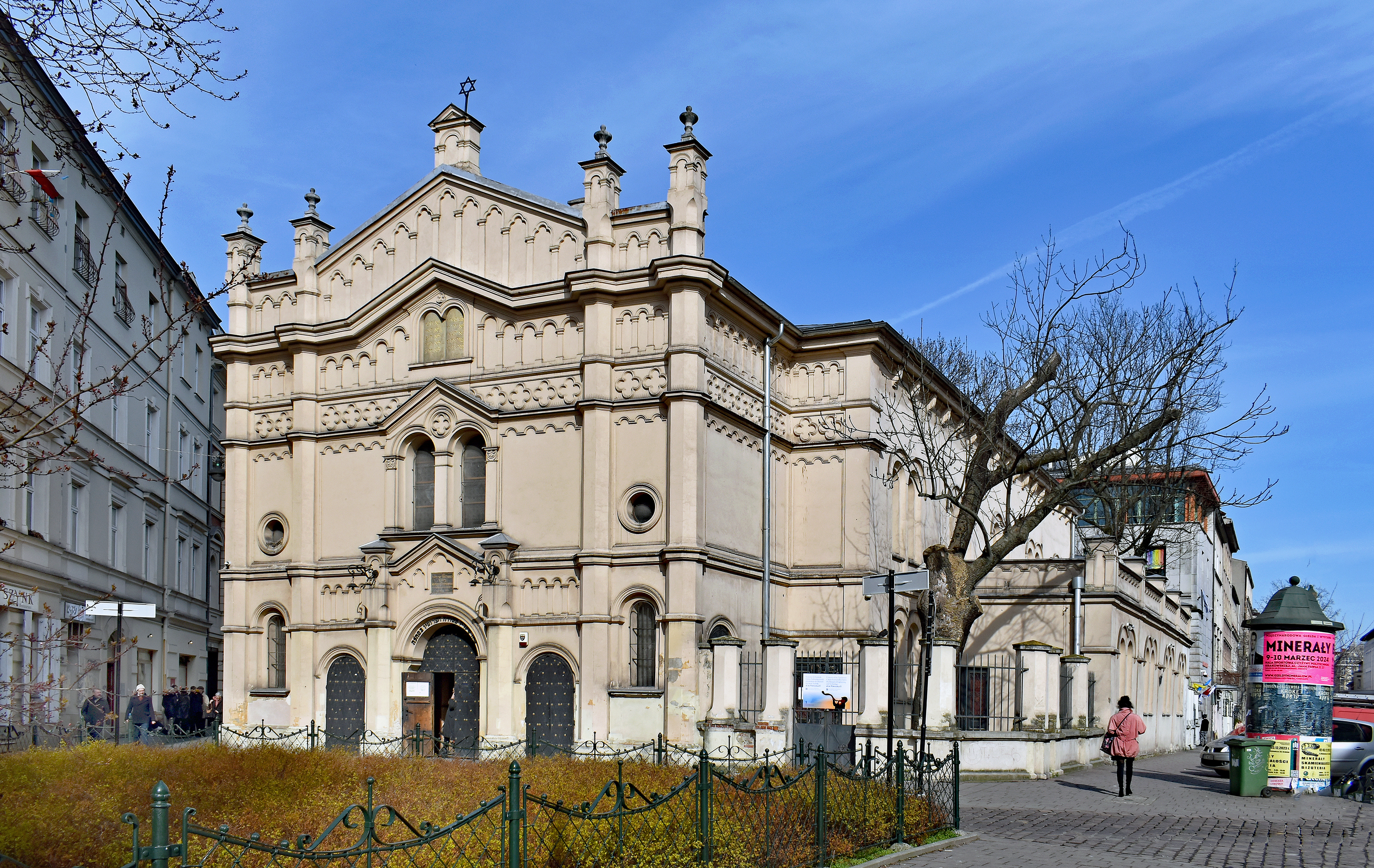
Tempel Synagogue
24 Miodowa Street

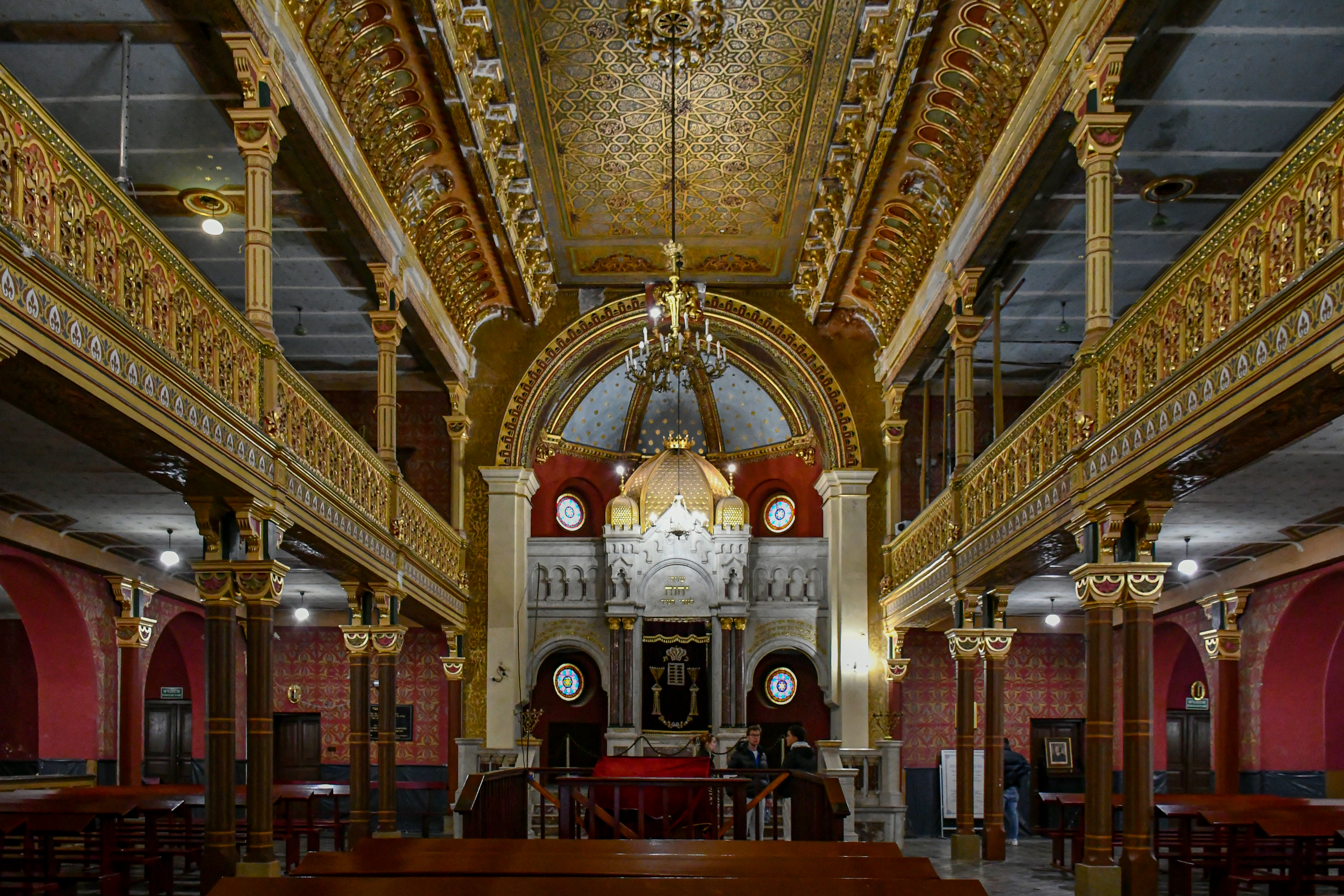
Tempel Synagogue, interior

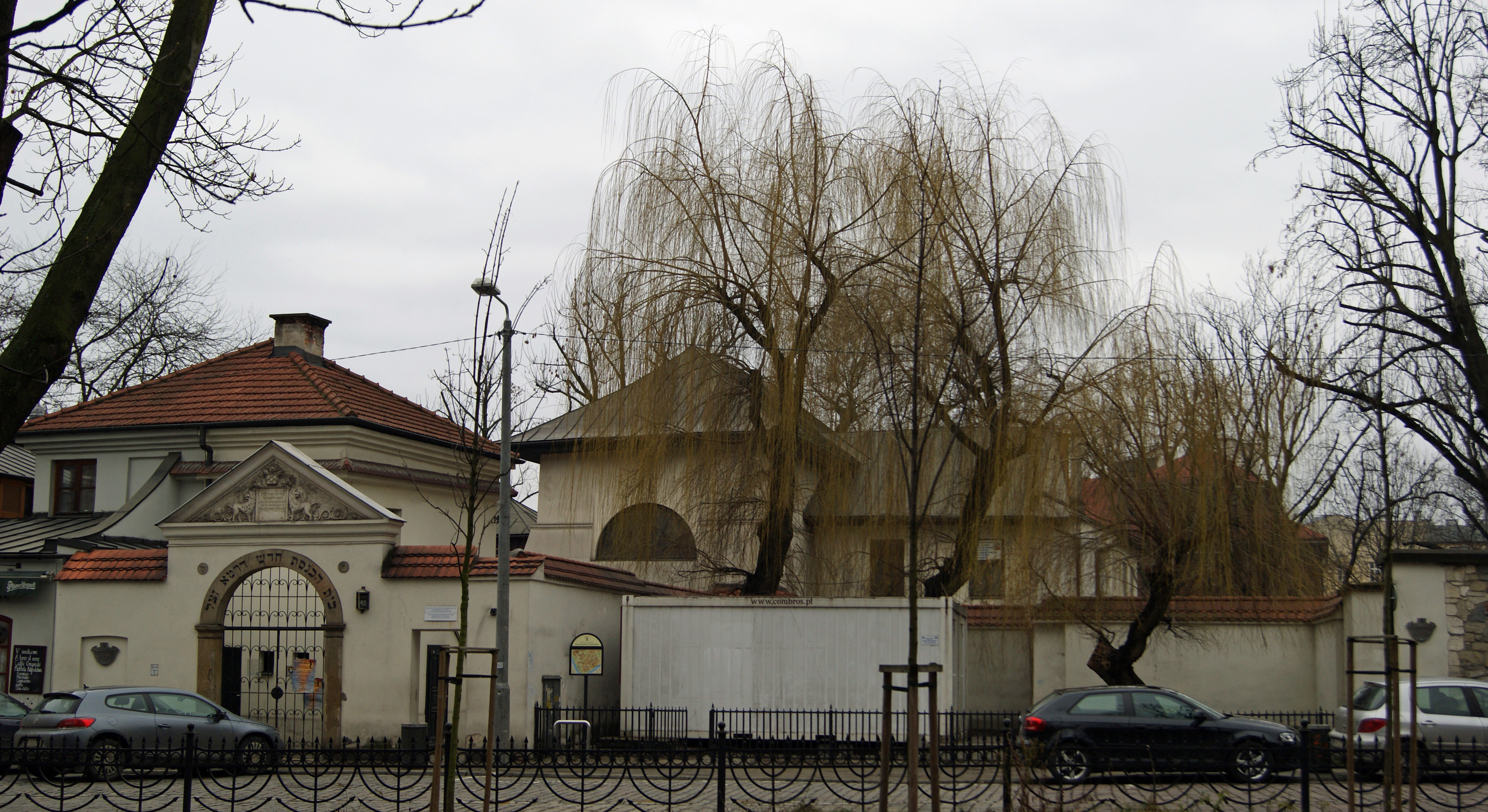
Remah Synagogue
40 Szeroka Street

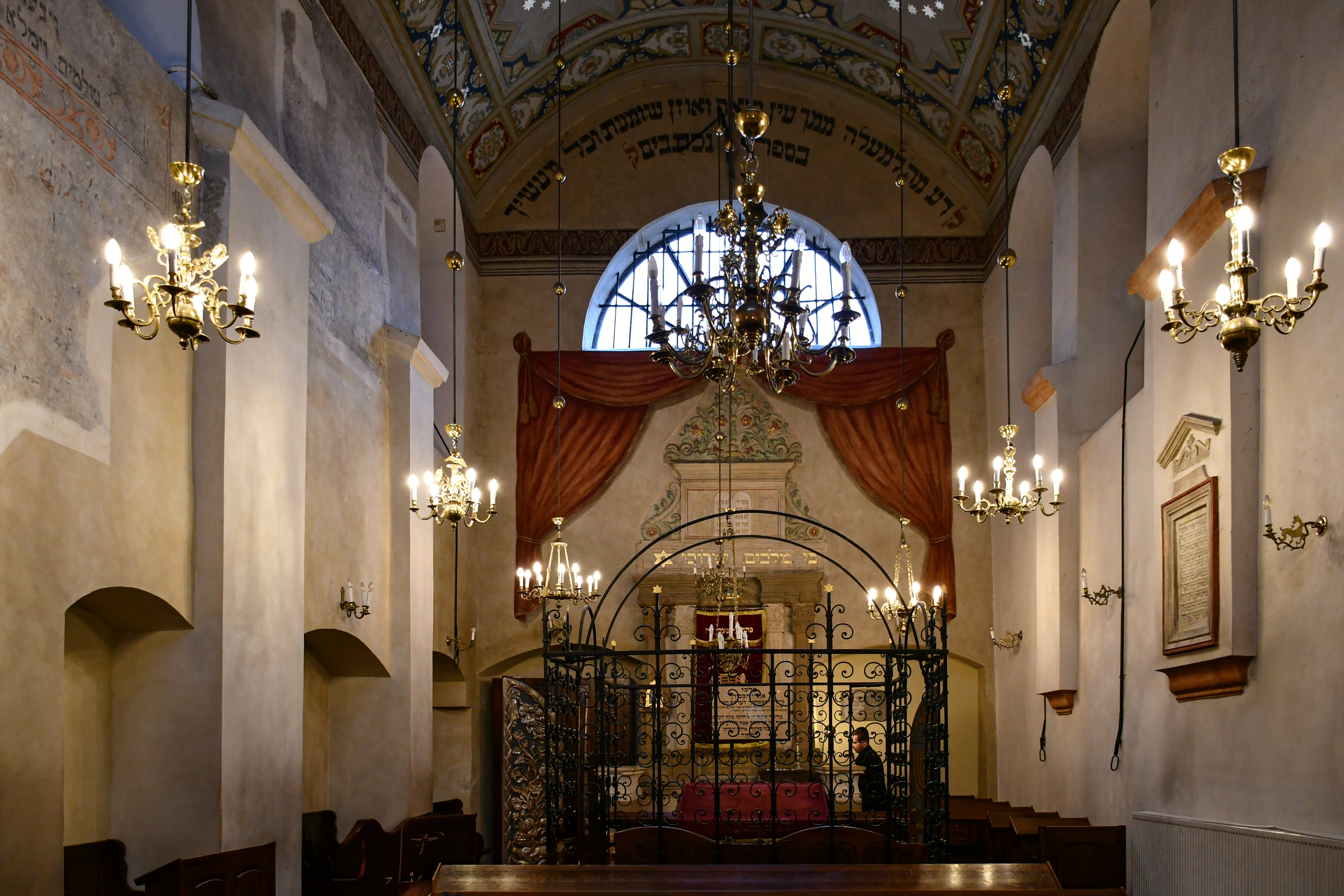
Remah Synagogue, interior

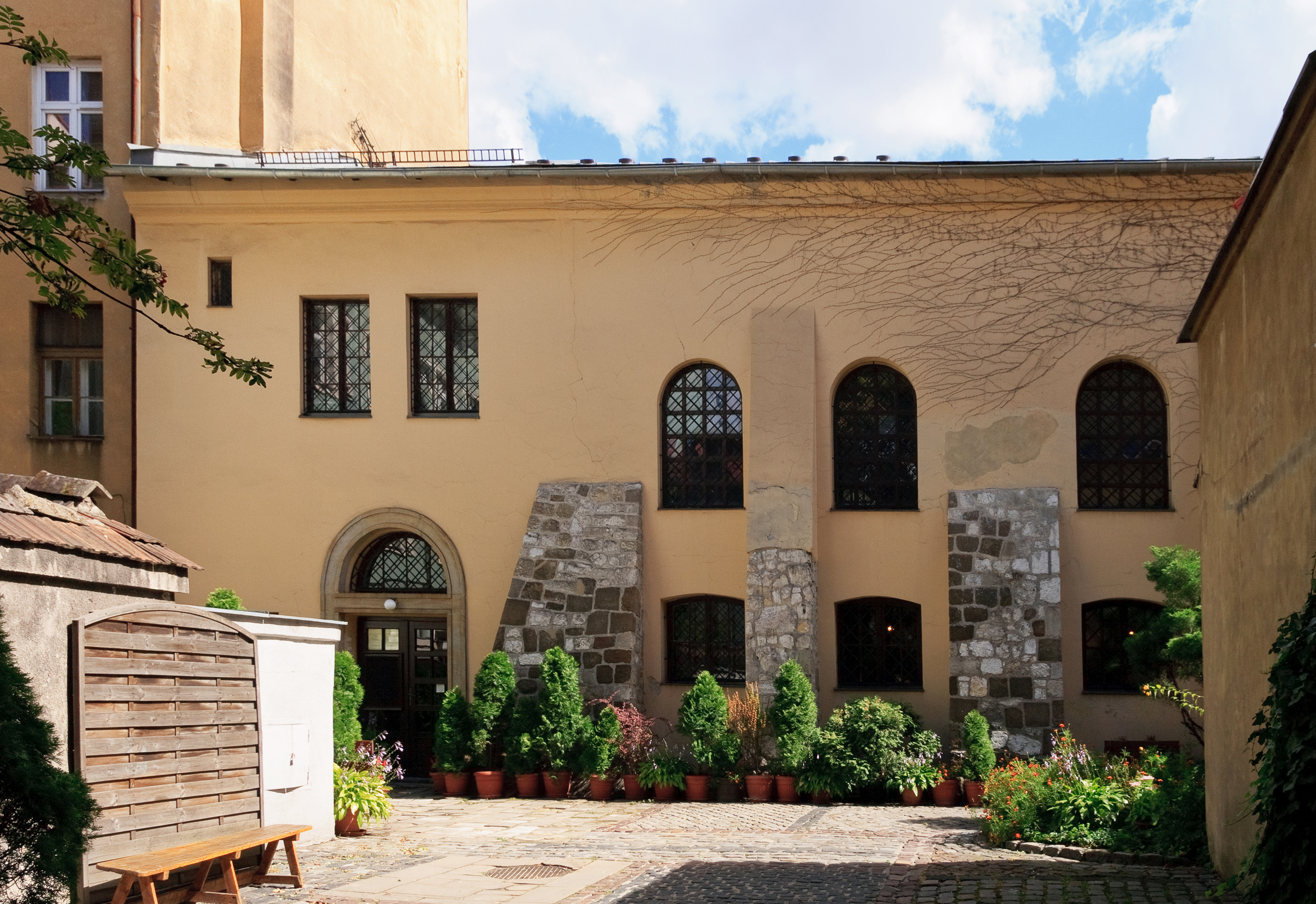
Wolf Popper Synagogue
16 Szeroka Street

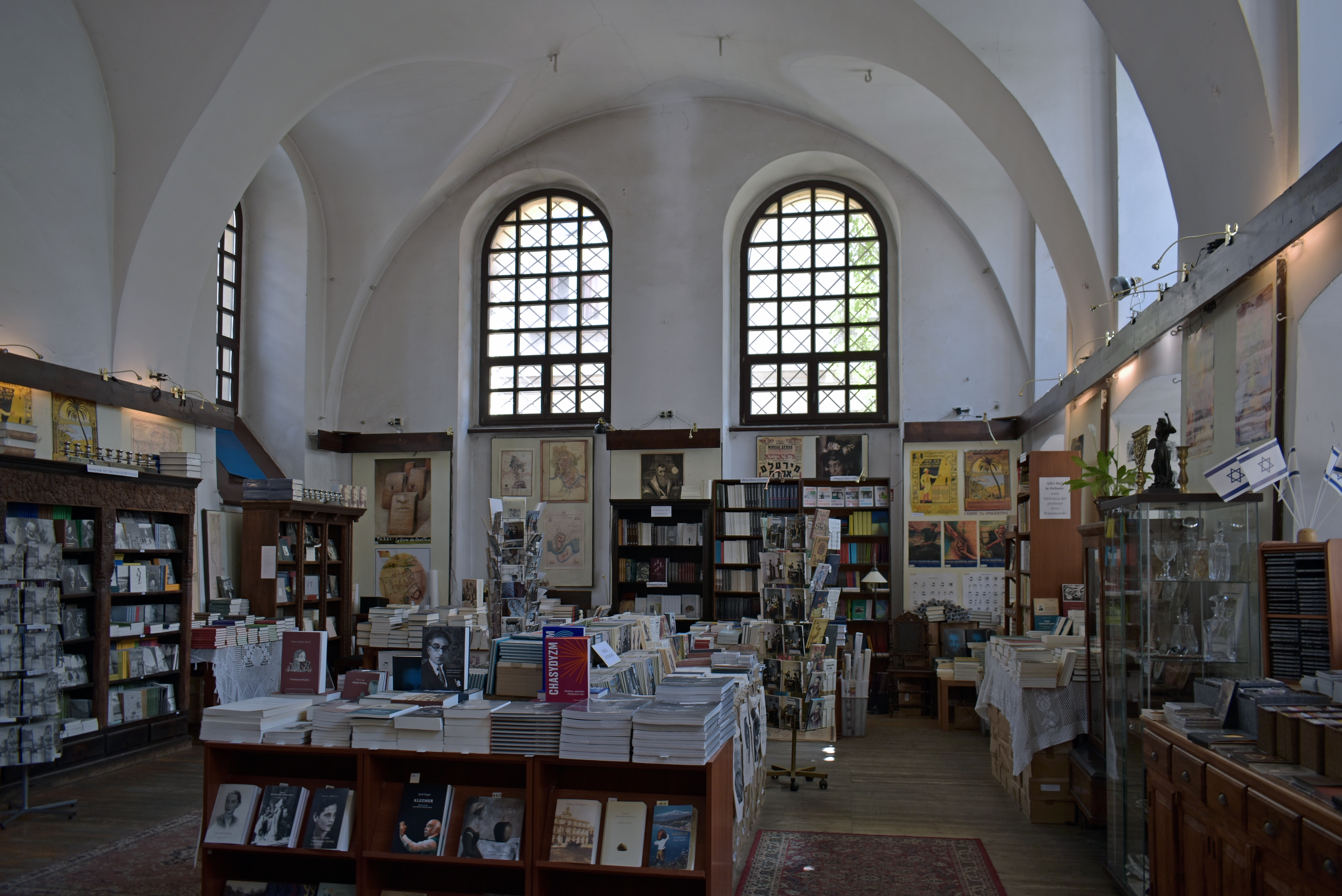
Wolf Popper Synagogue, interior

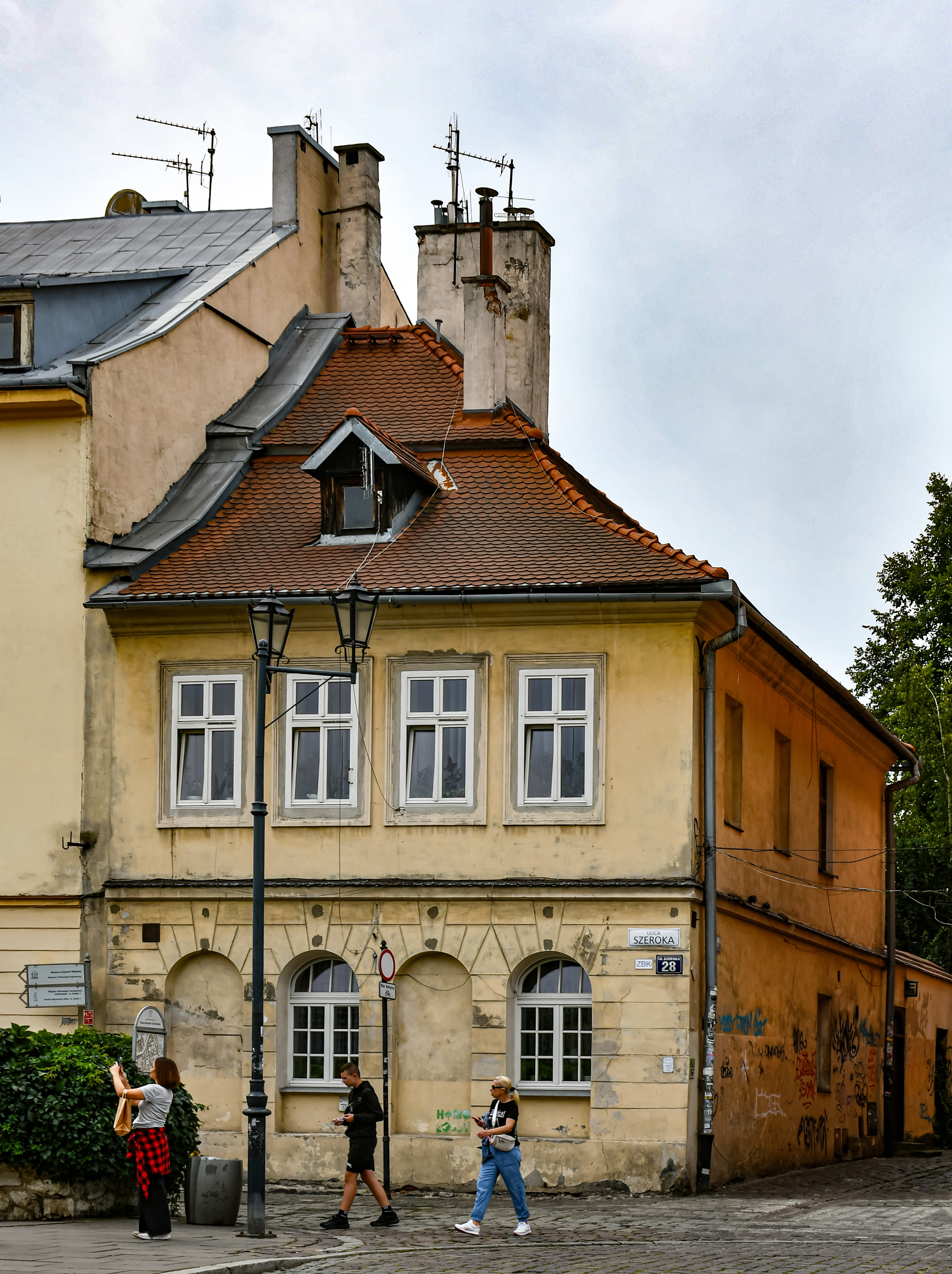
Gmilus Chasidim Debais Hakneses Prayerhouse
28 Szeroka Street

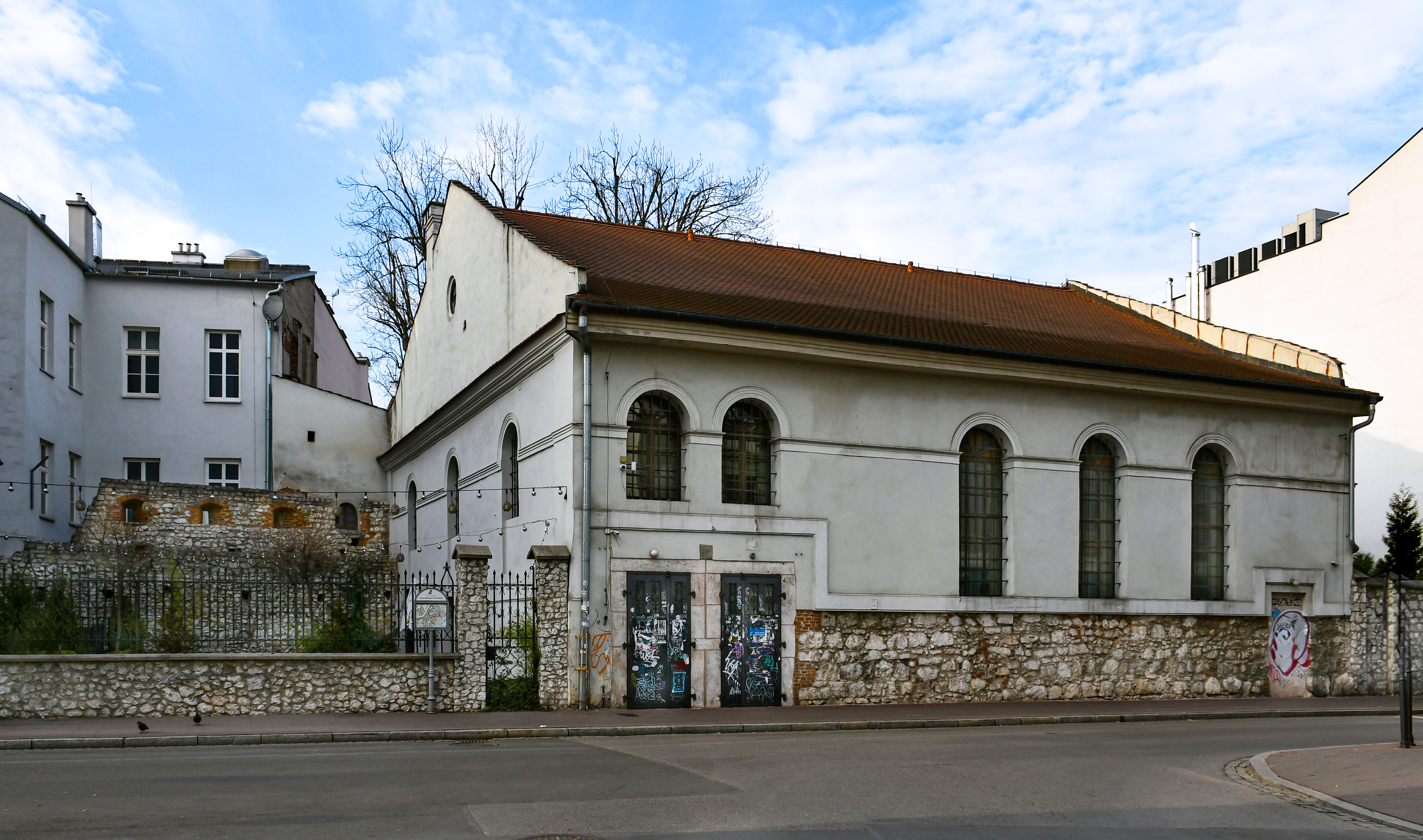
Kupa Synagogue
27 Miodowa Street

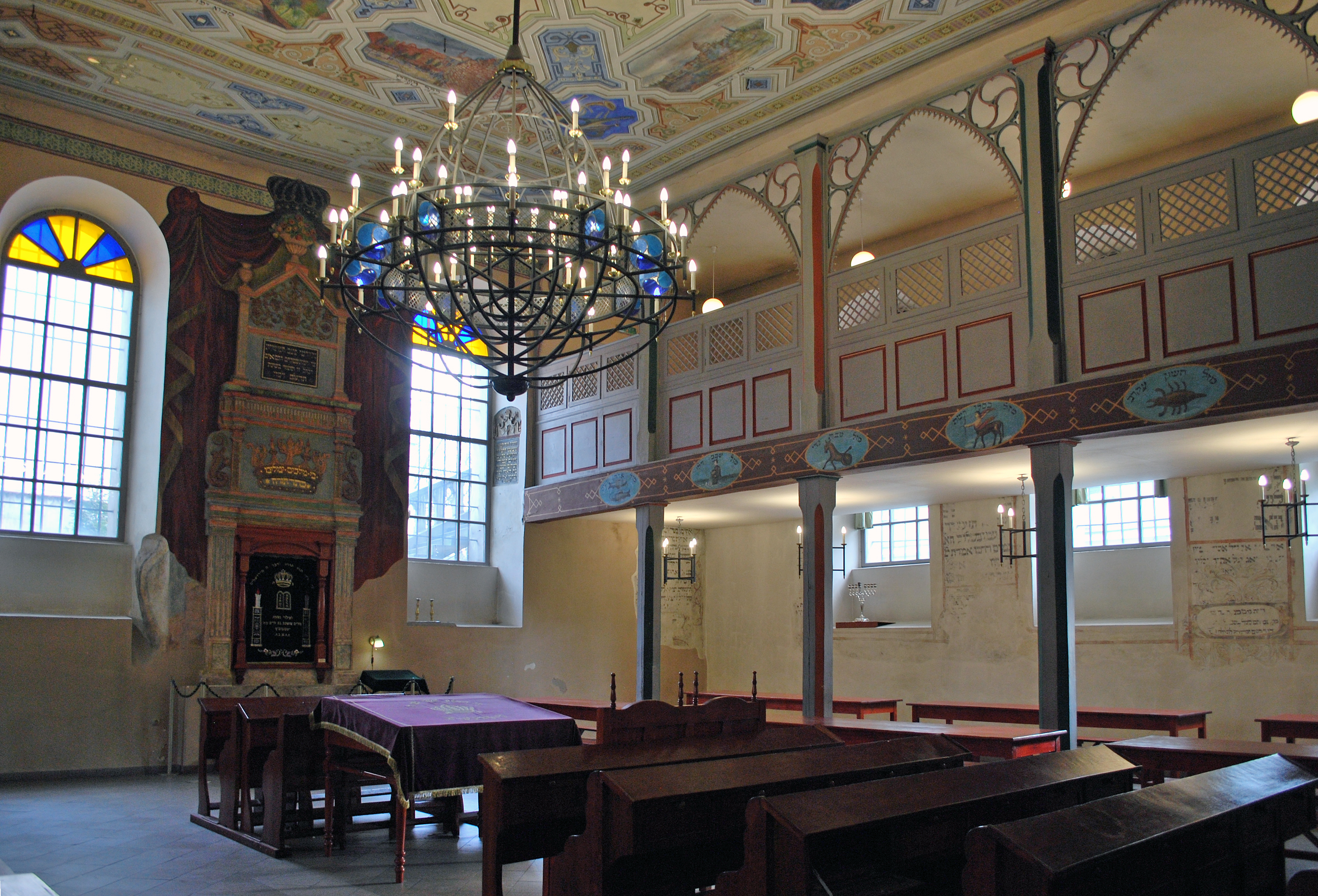
Kupa Synagogue, interior

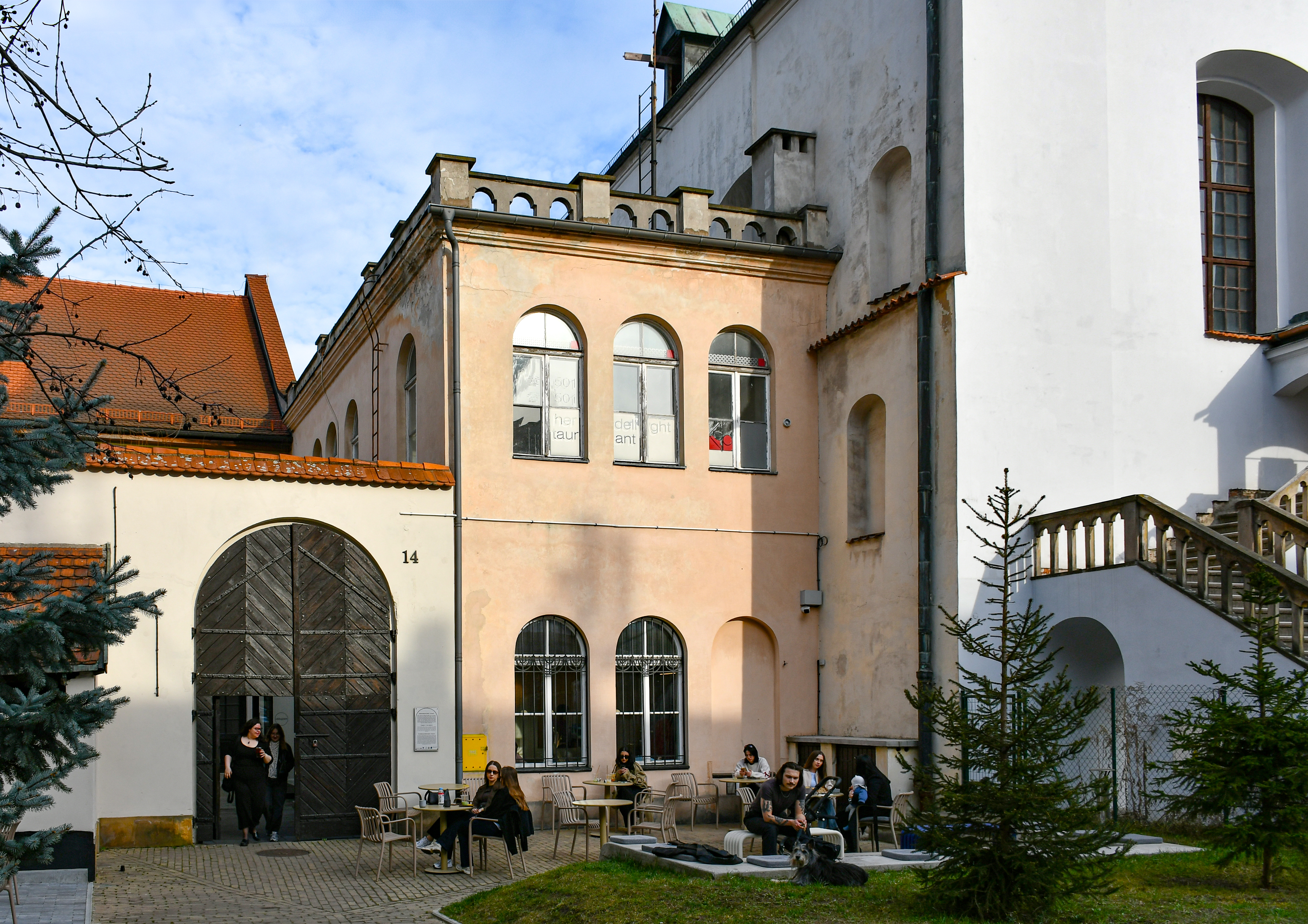
Mizrachi Synagogue
14 Kupa Street

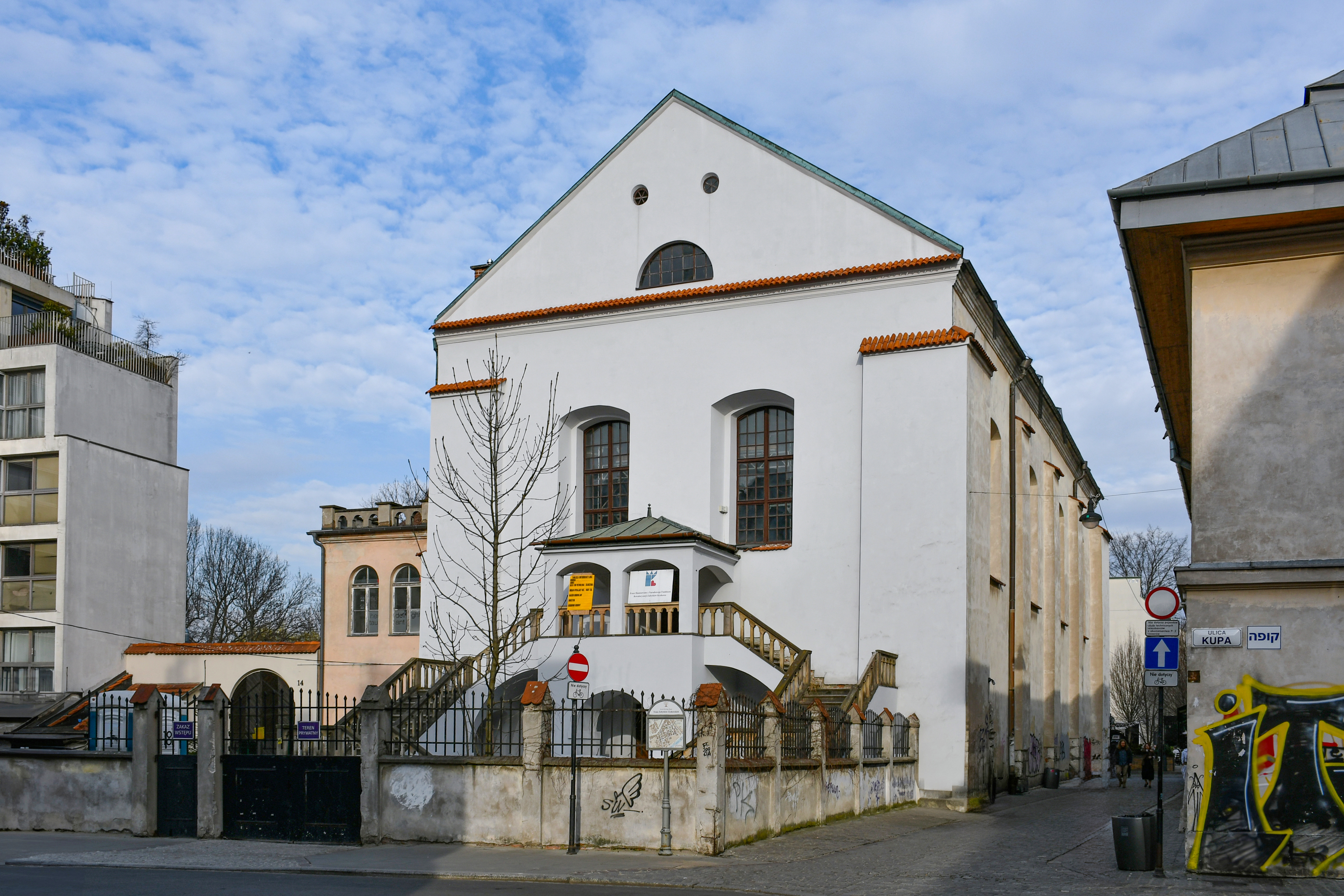
Izaak Synagogue
14 Kupa Street

Izaac Synagogue, interior

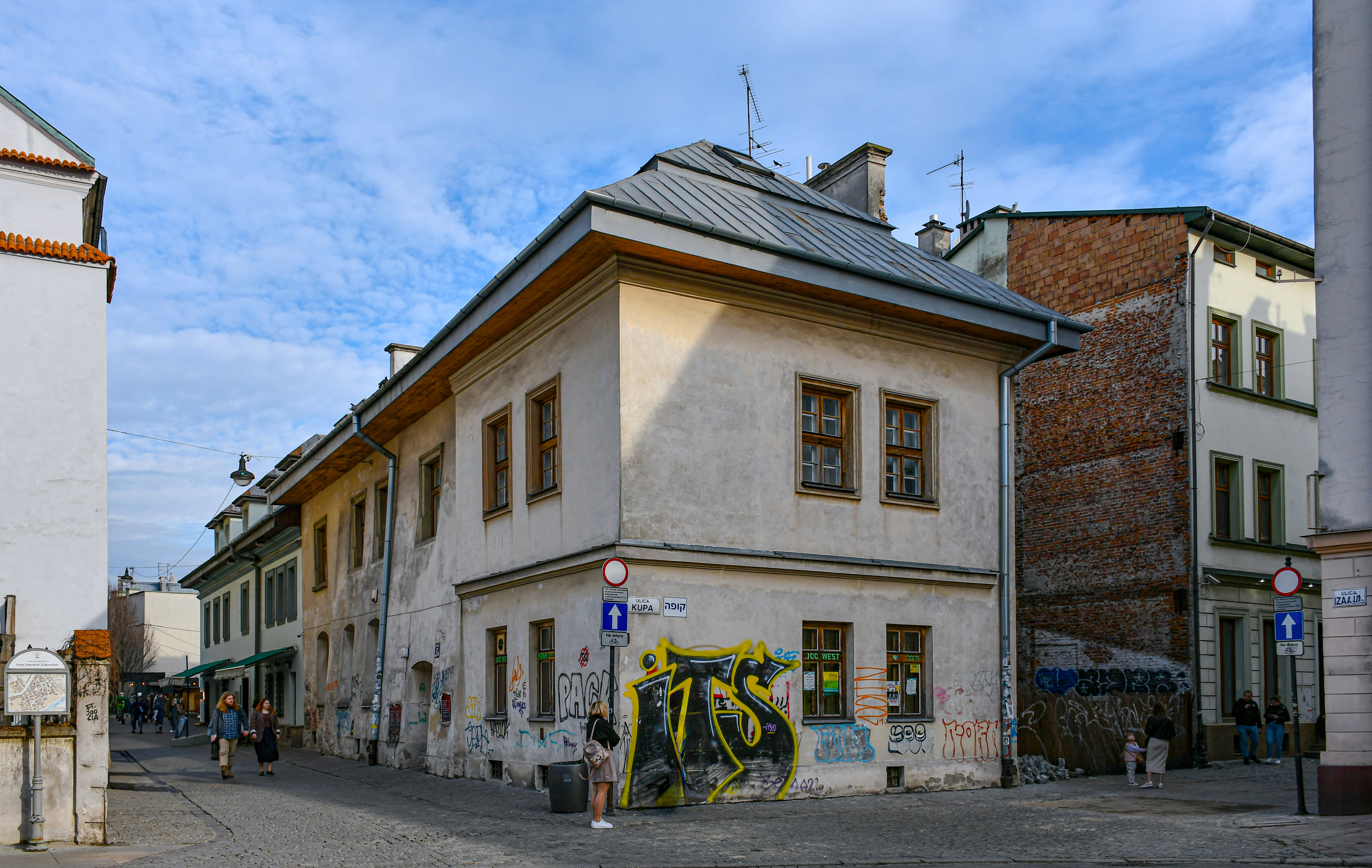
Hevra Shir Prayerhouse
20 Kupa Street

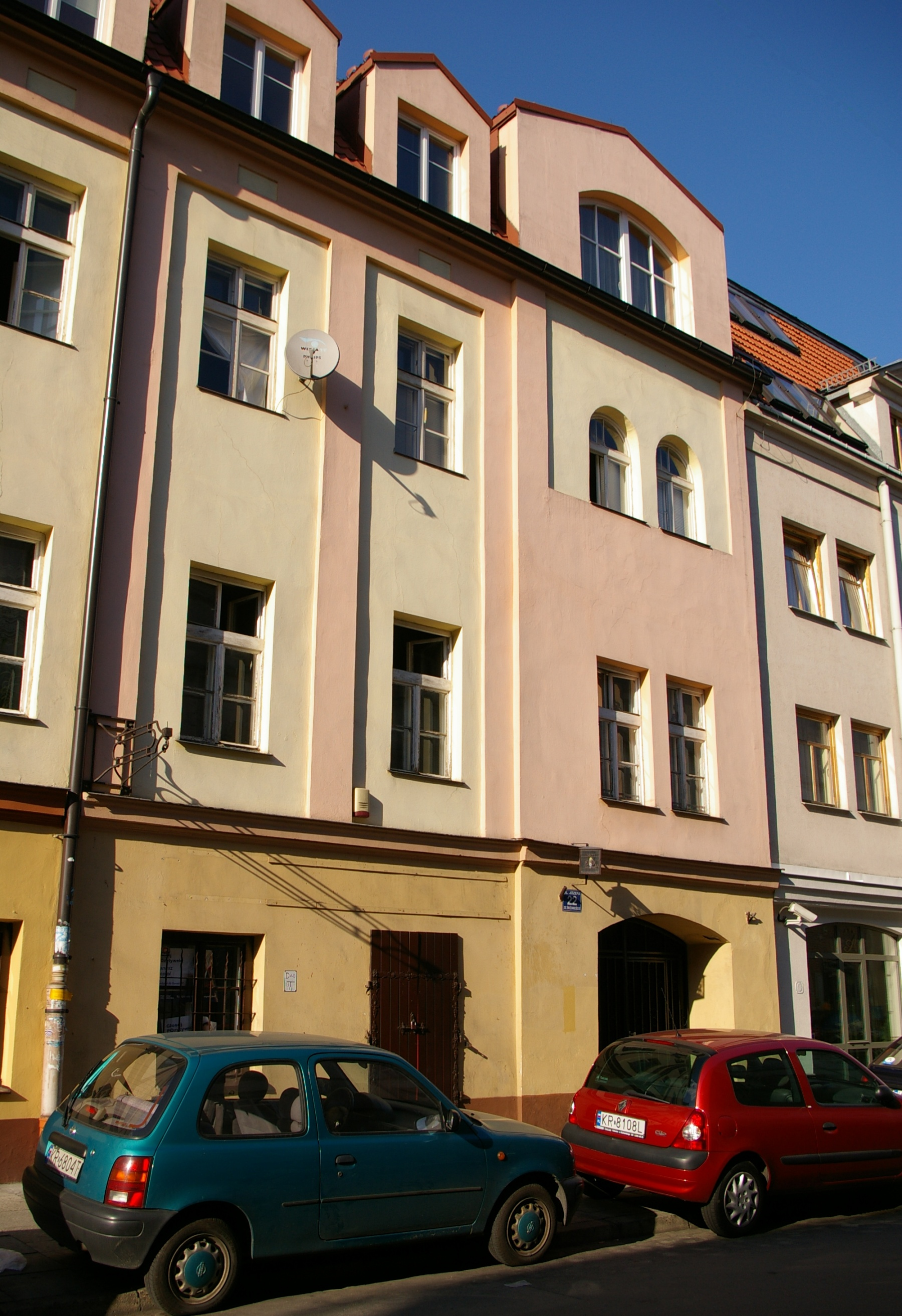
Ahawat Tora Synagogue
22 Józefa Street

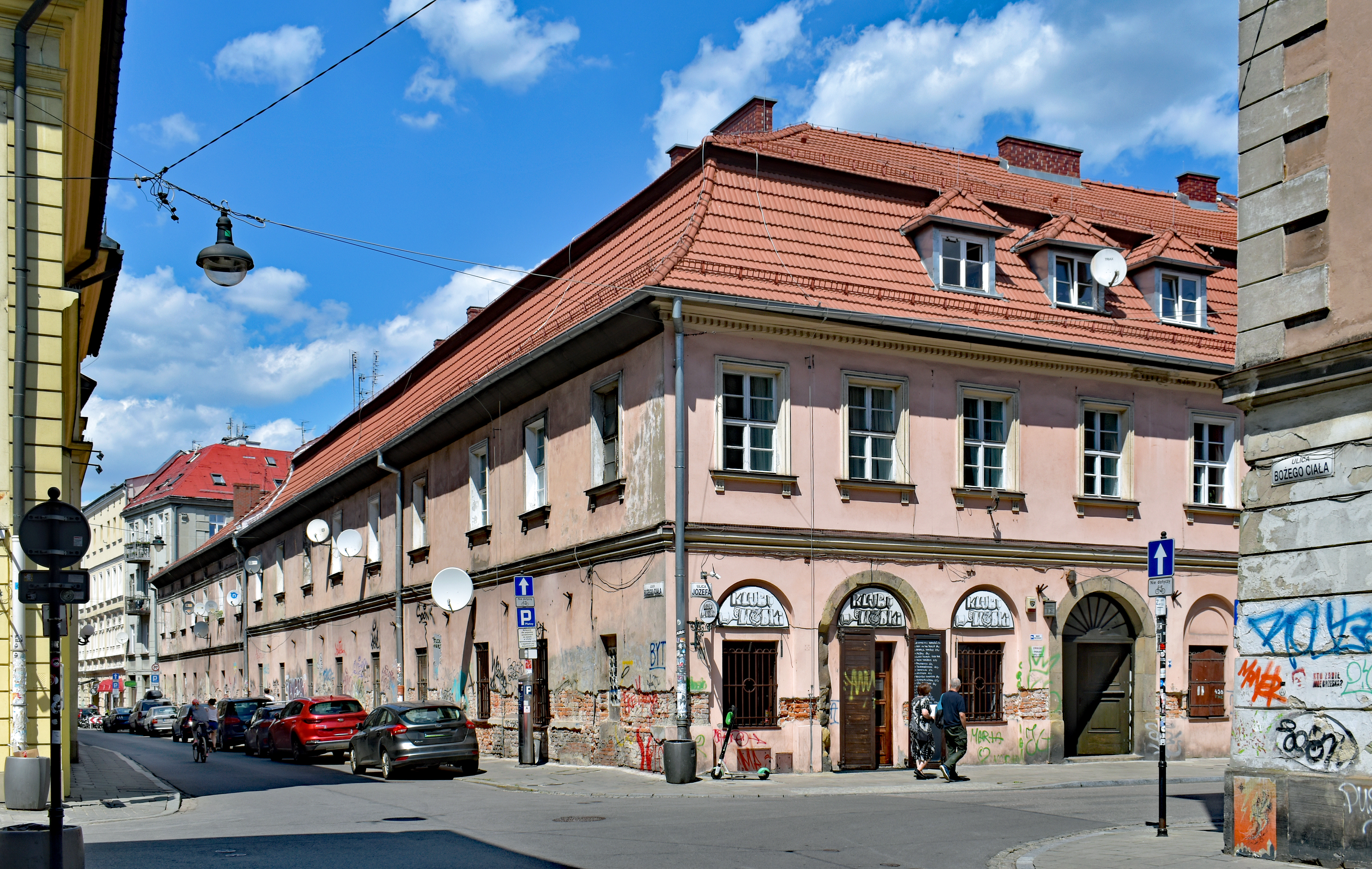
Etz Chaim Synagogue
12 Józefa Street

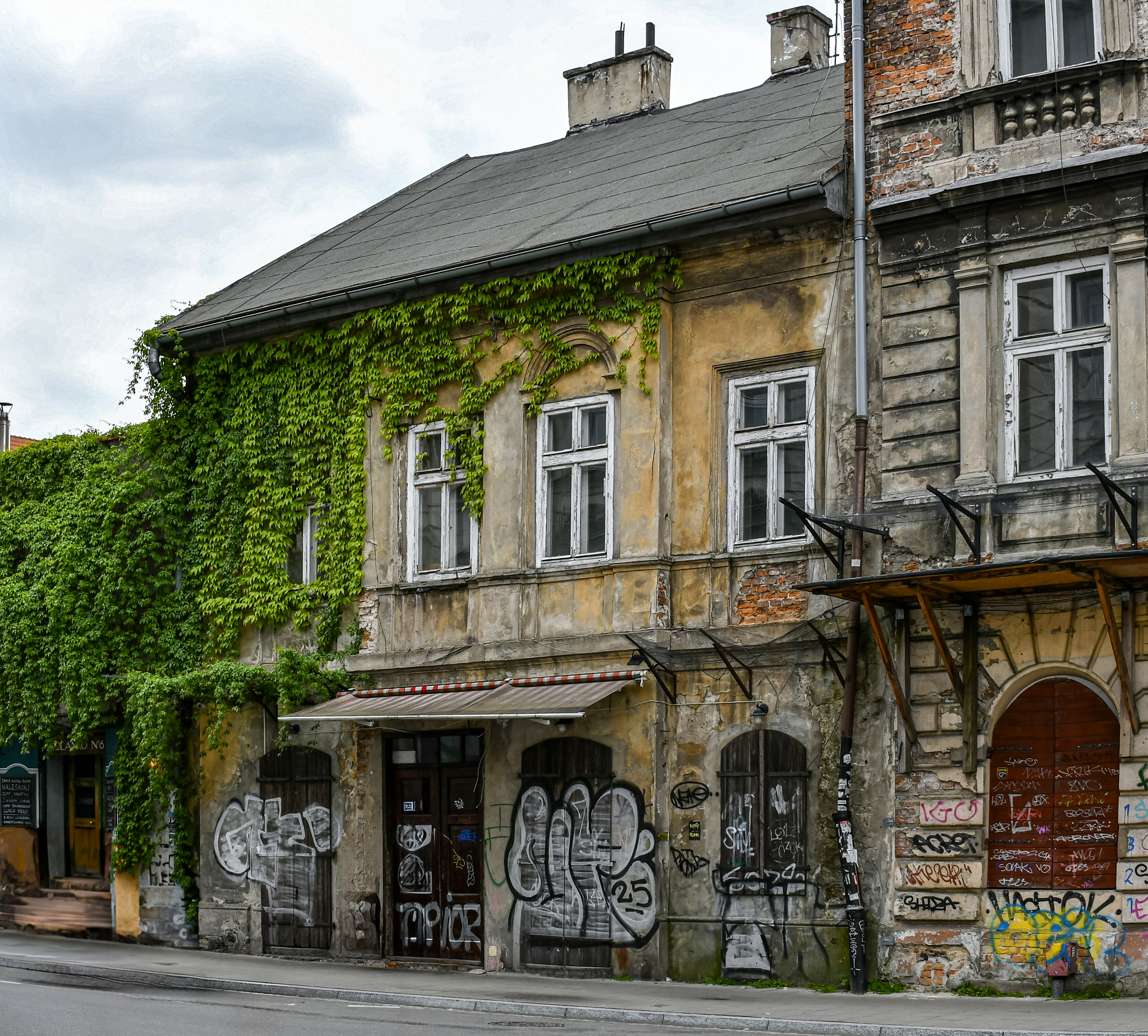
Hasidim from Radomsko (Radomsker Novi)
15 Józefa Street

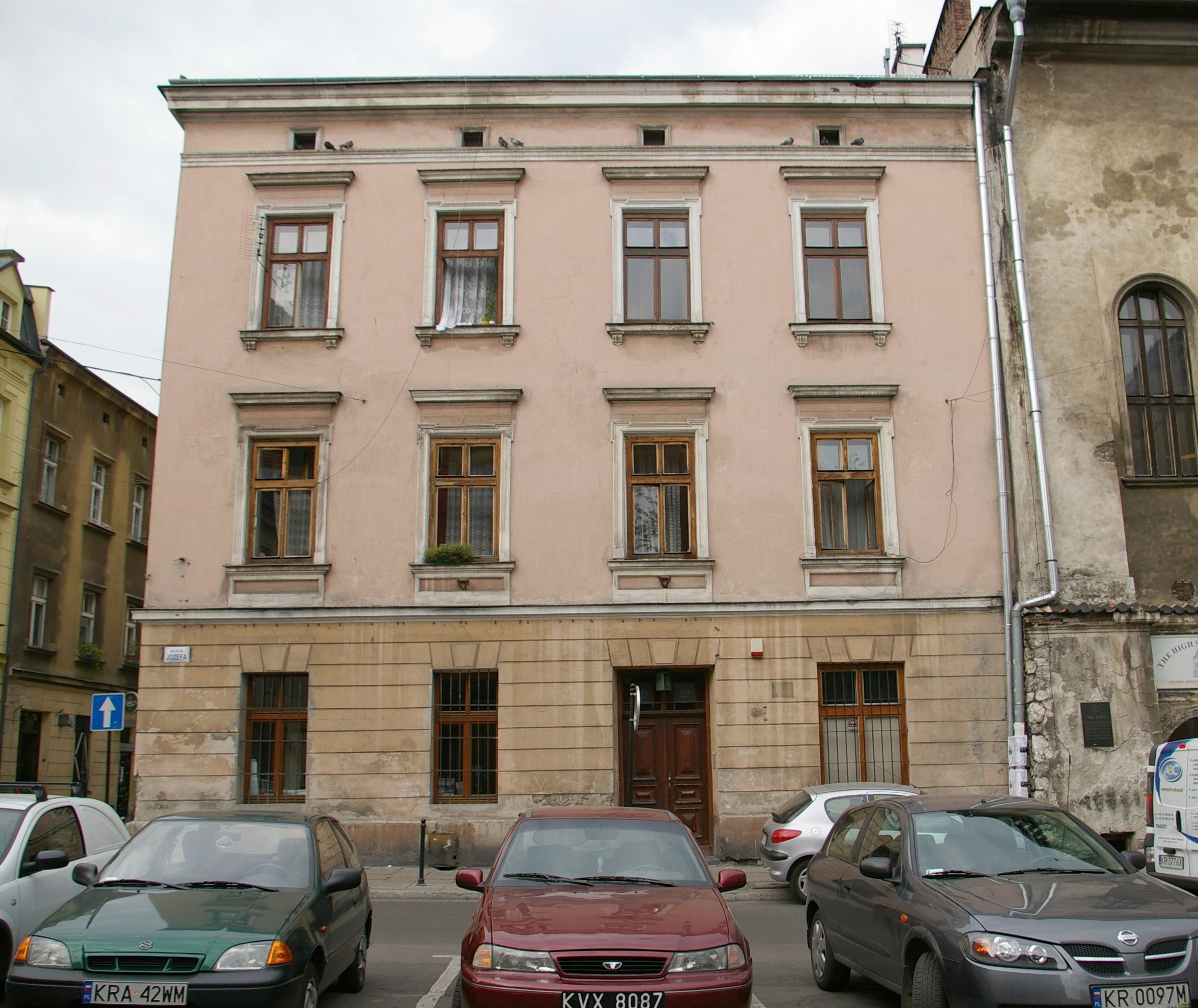
Chewra Ner Tamid Synagogue
36 Józefa Street

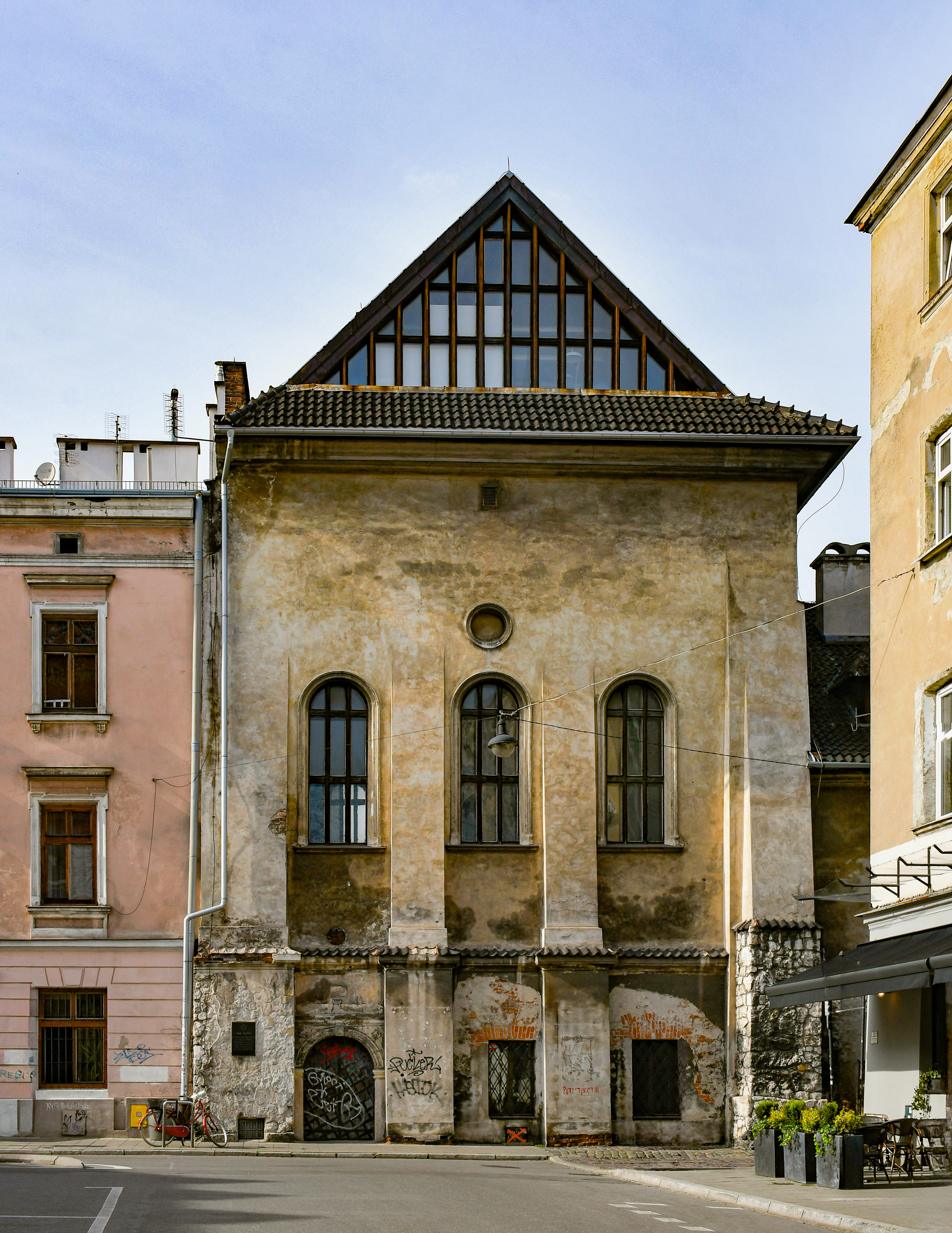
High Synagogue
38 Józefa Street

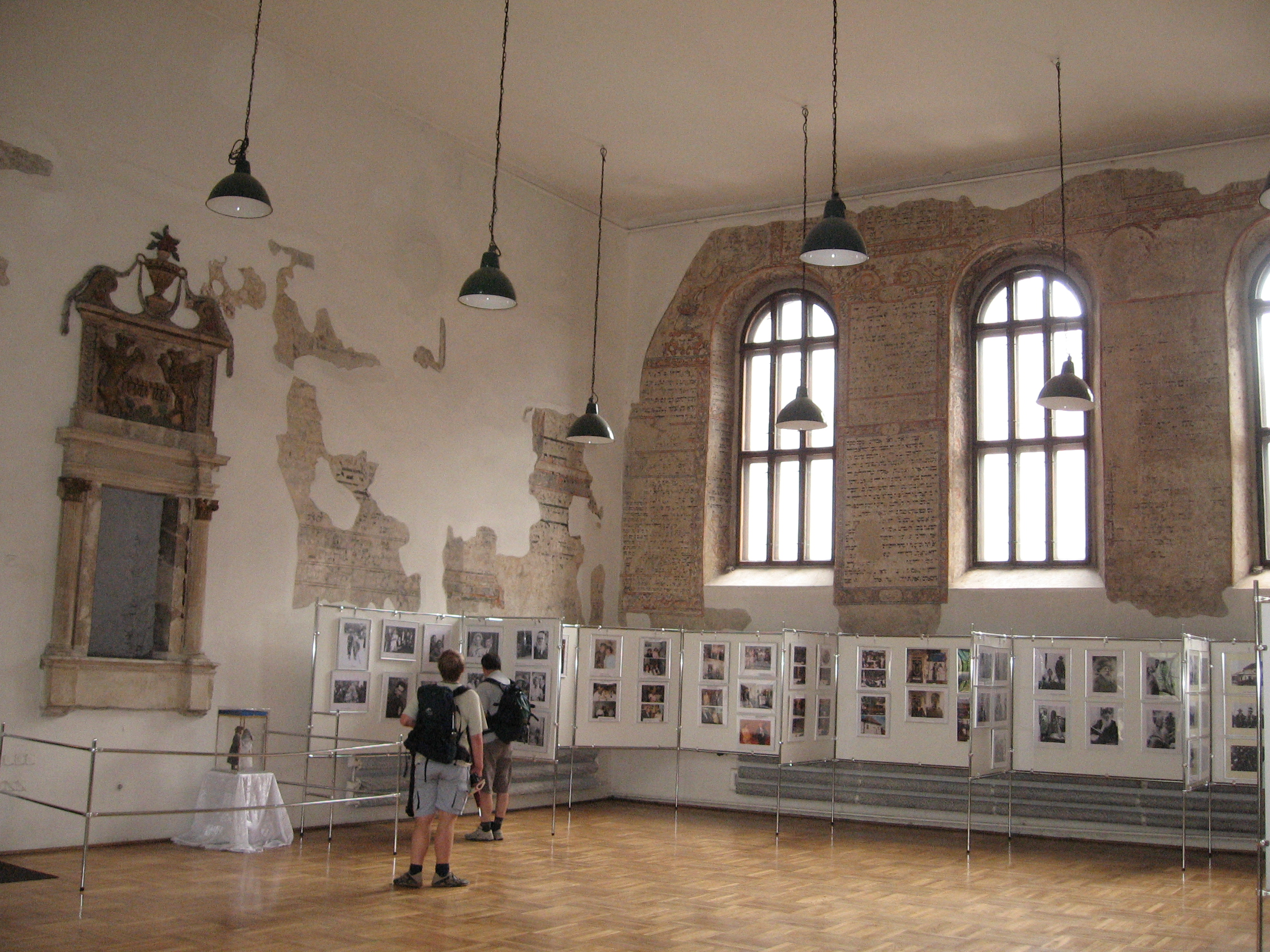
High Synagogue, interior

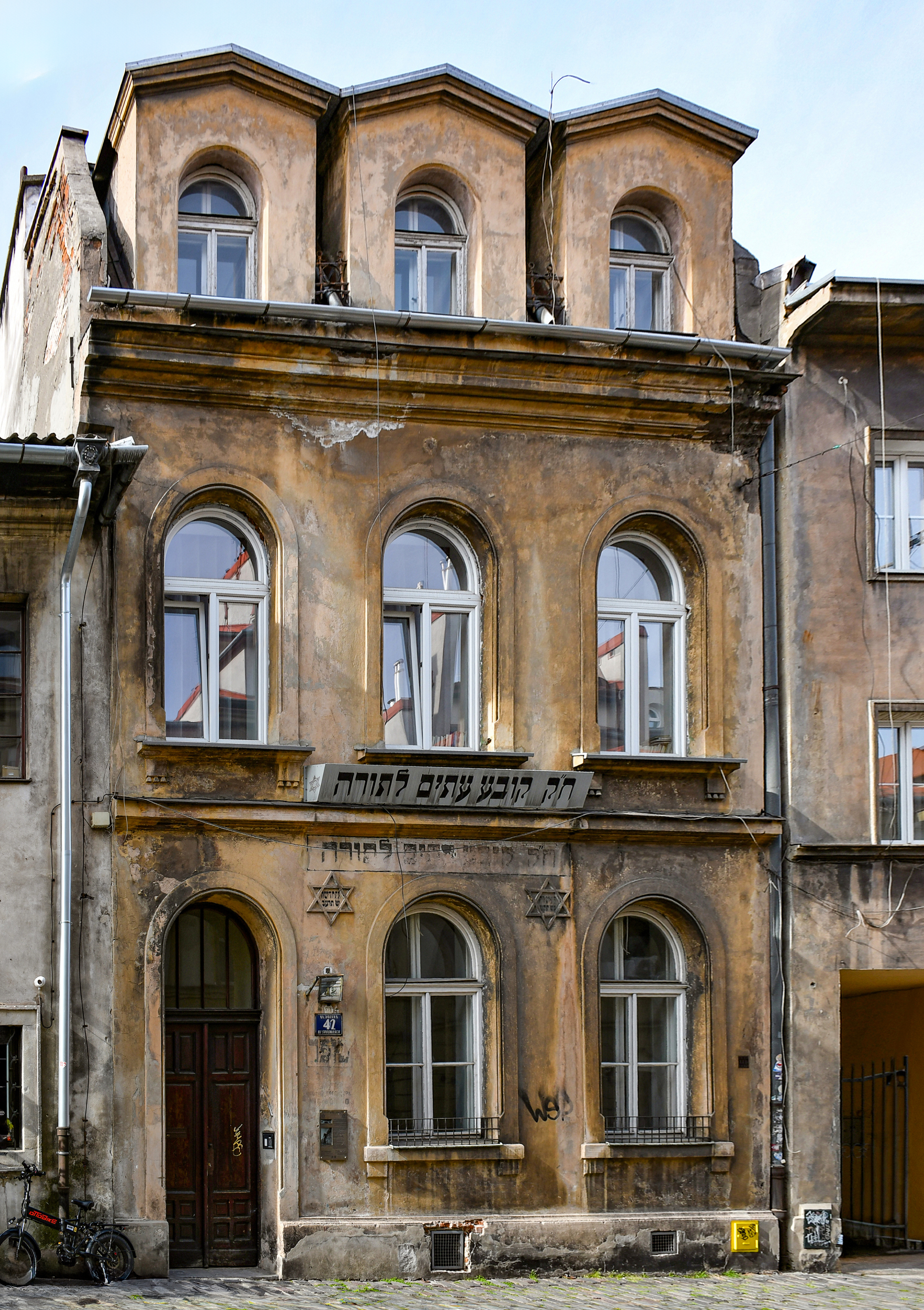
Kowea Itim le-Tora Synagogue
42 Józefa Street

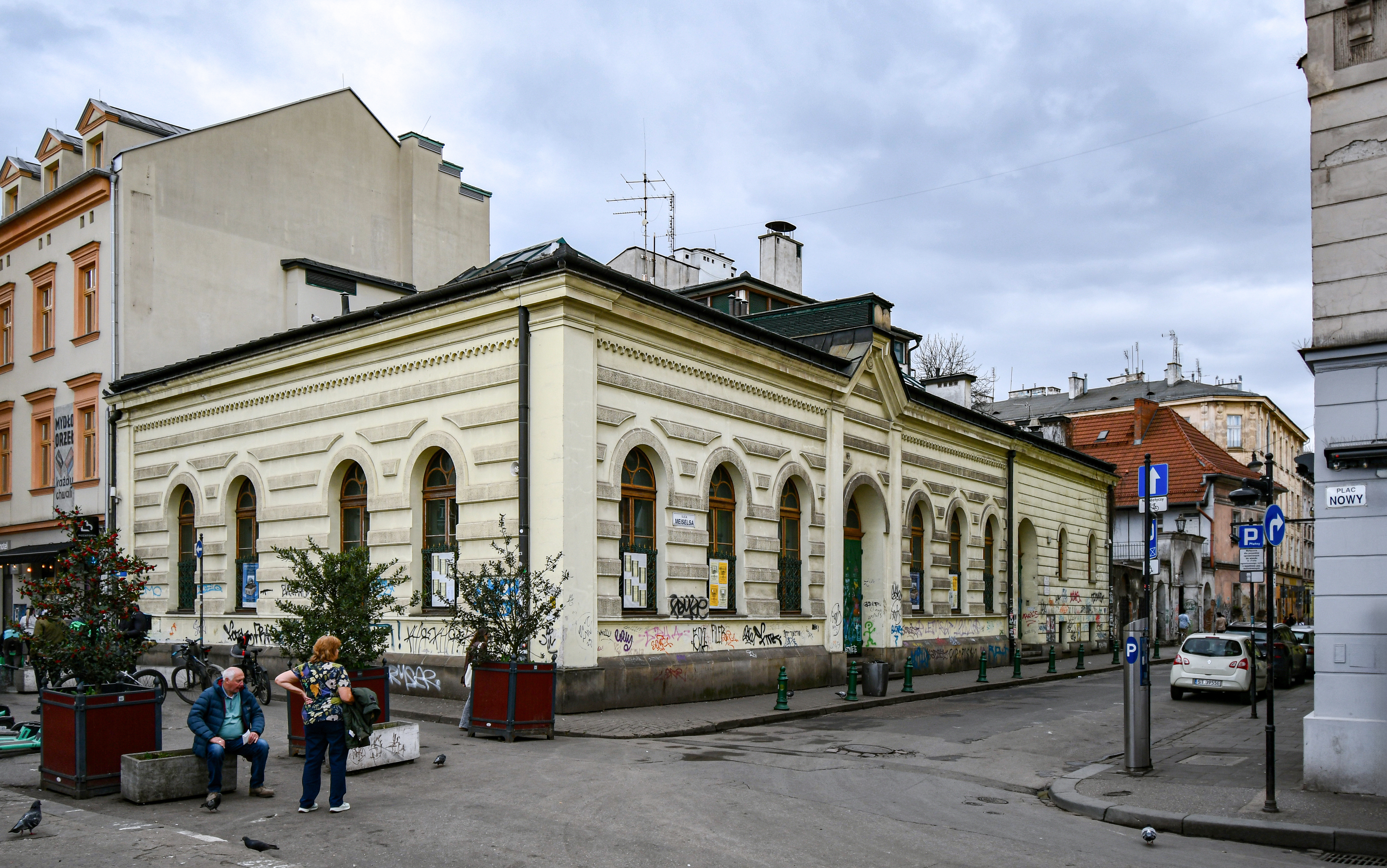
Bne Emuna Prayerhouse
17 Beer Meisels Street

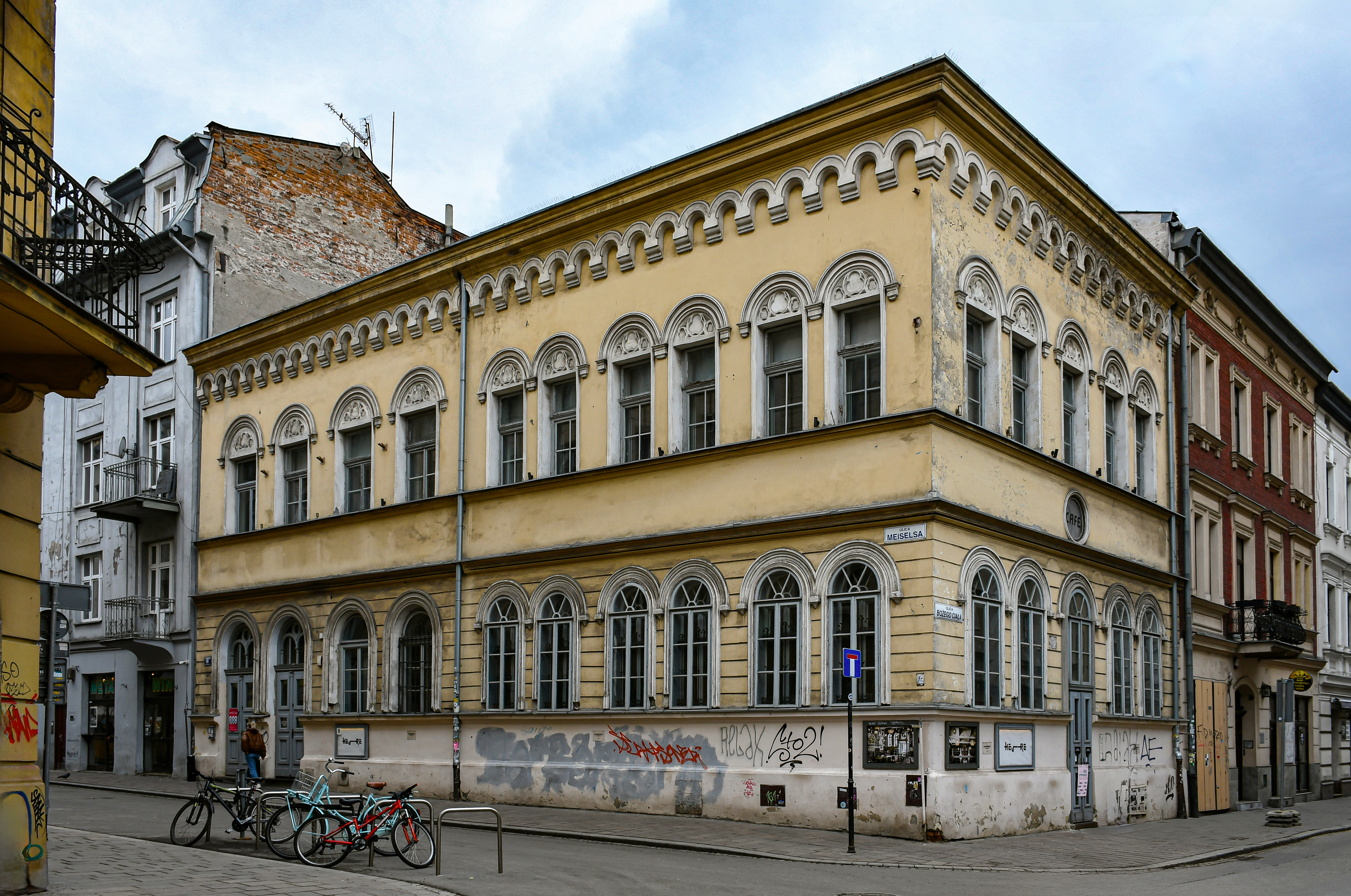
Chewra Thilim Synagogue
18 Beer Meisels Street

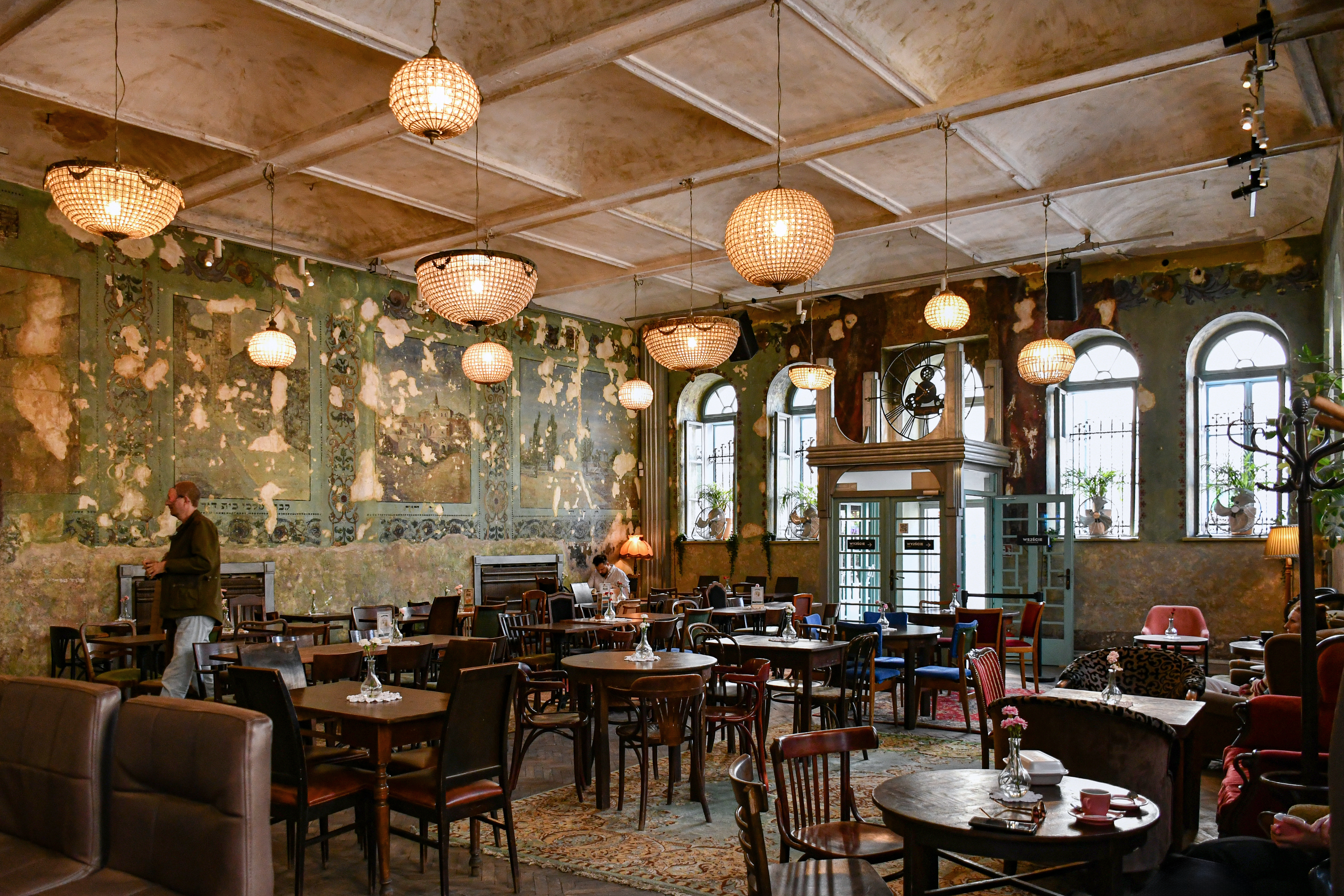
Chewra Thilim Synagogue, interior

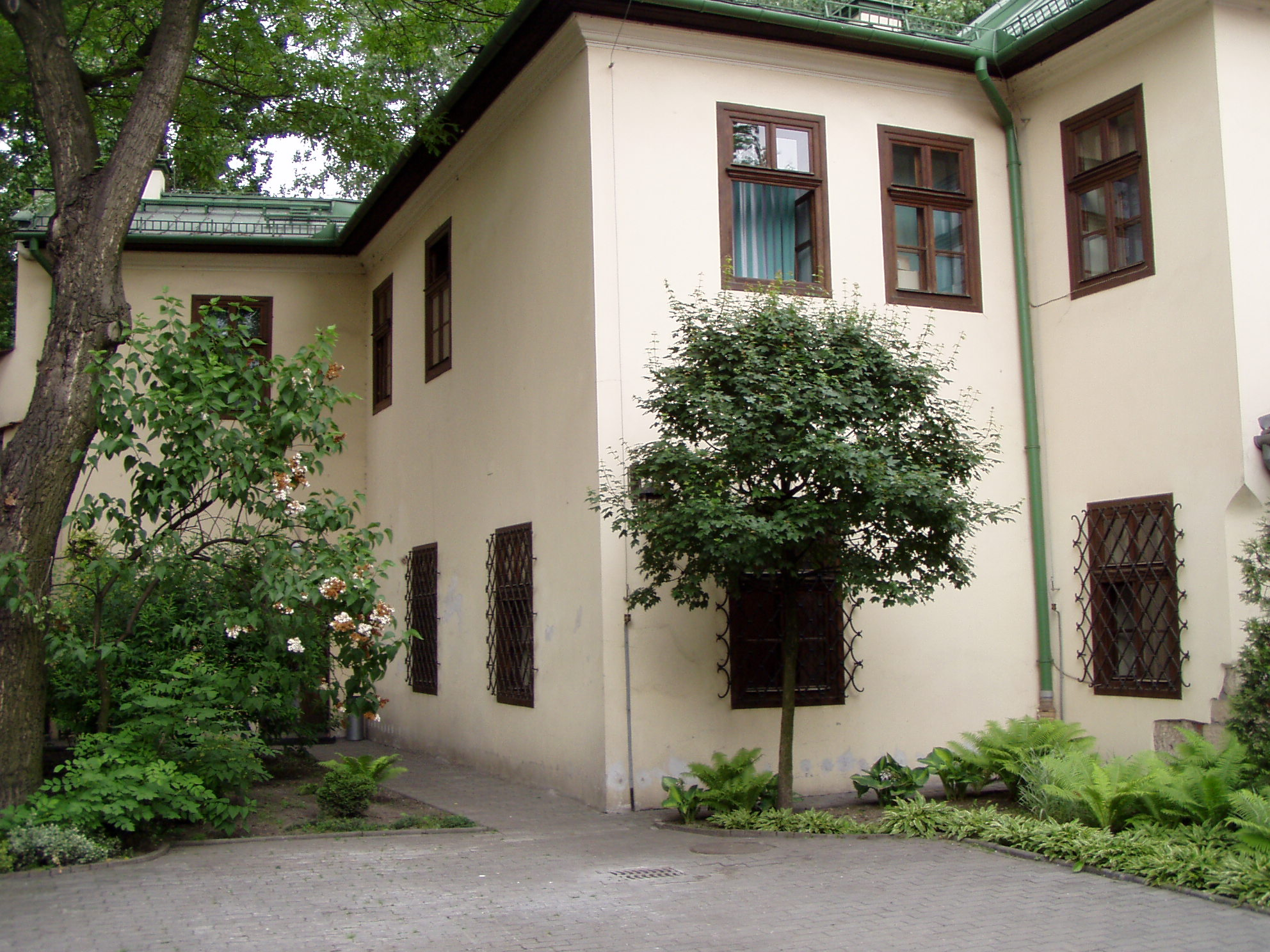
Hasidim from Radomsko (Radomsker)
10 Ciemna Street

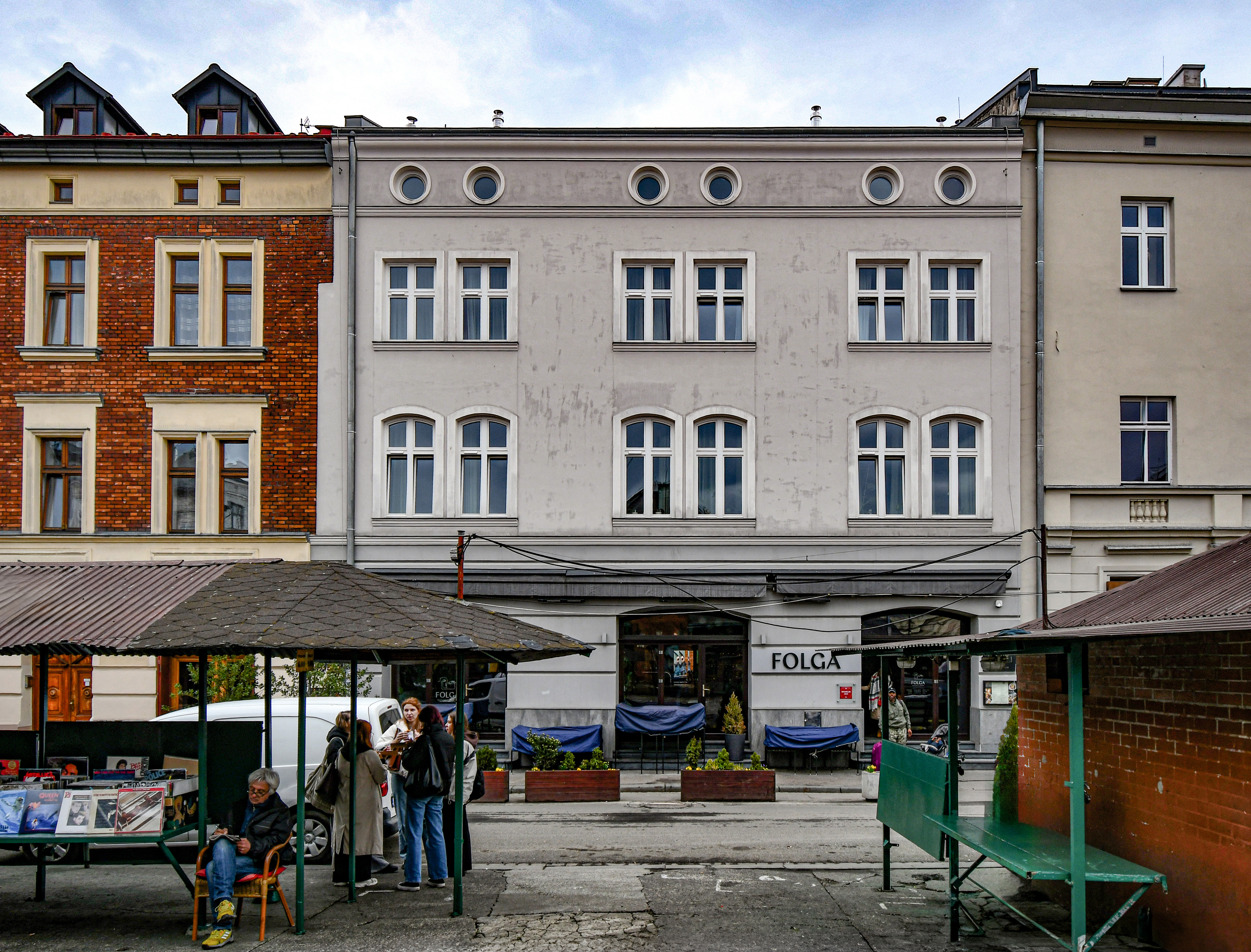
Hasidim from Bobov (Chaim Halberstam) Synagogue
12 Estery Street

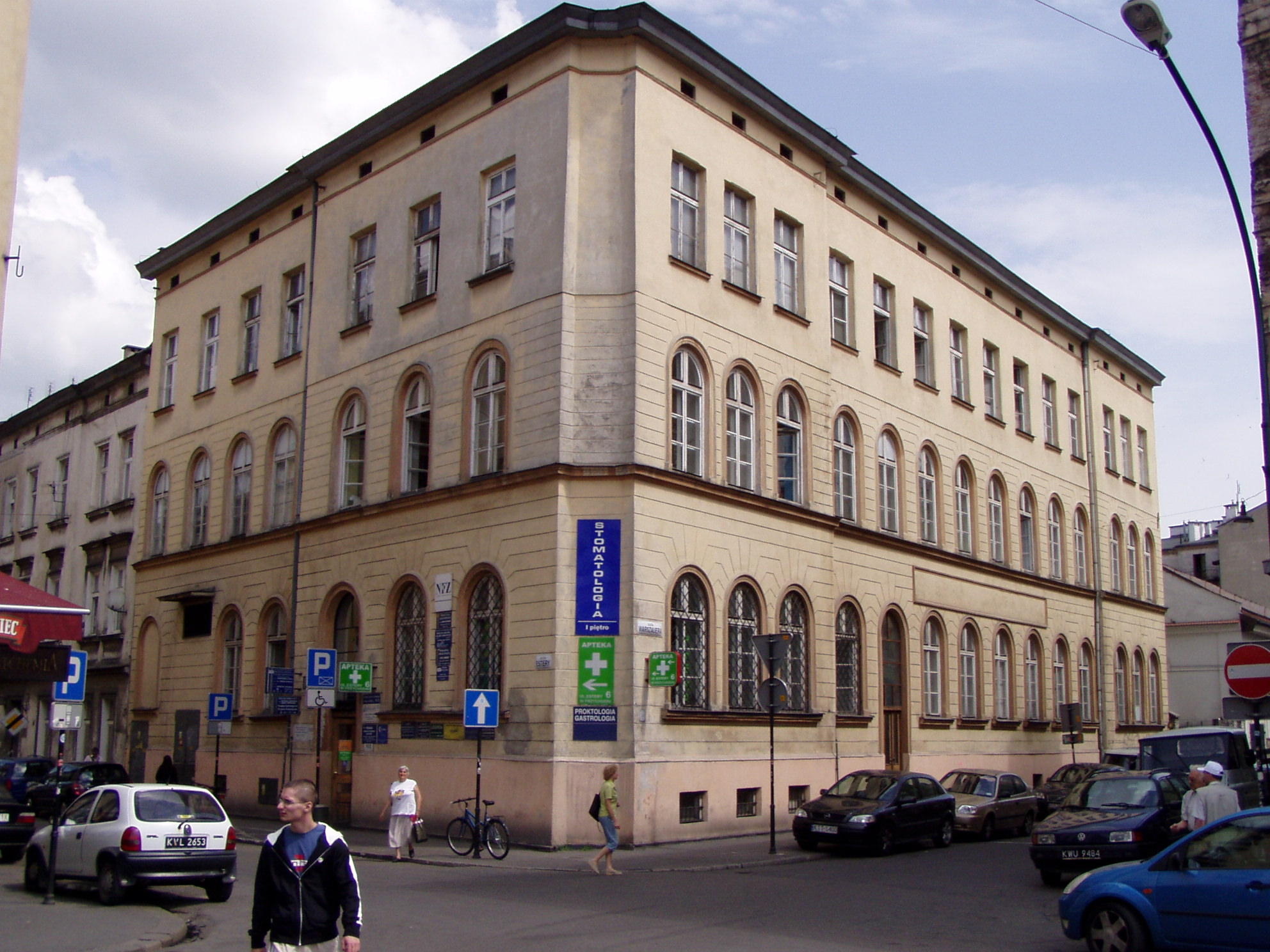
Talmud Torah Synagogue
6 Estery Street

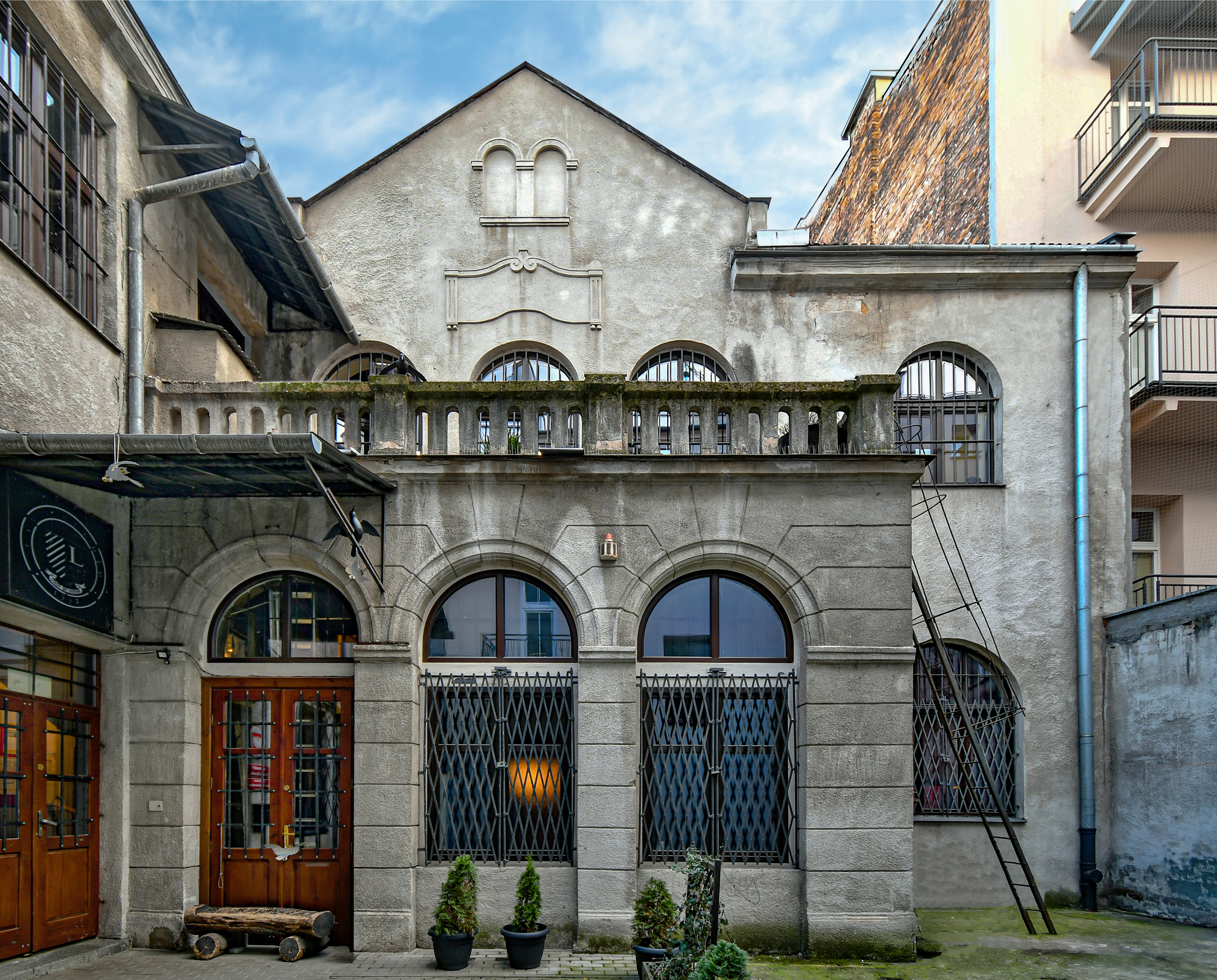
Salomon Deiches Synagogue
6a Brzozowa Street

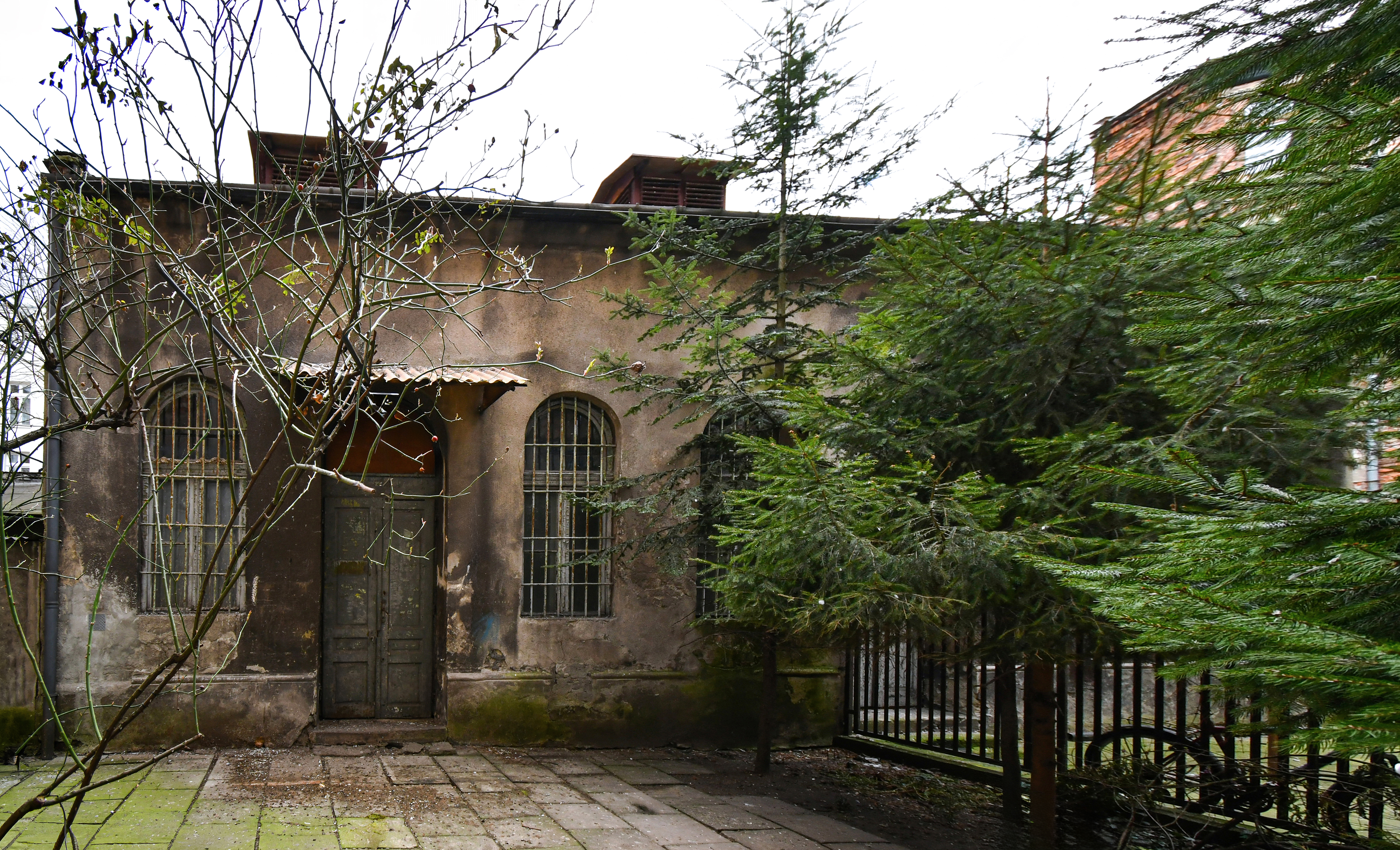
Lednitzers Synagogue
8 Mostowa Street

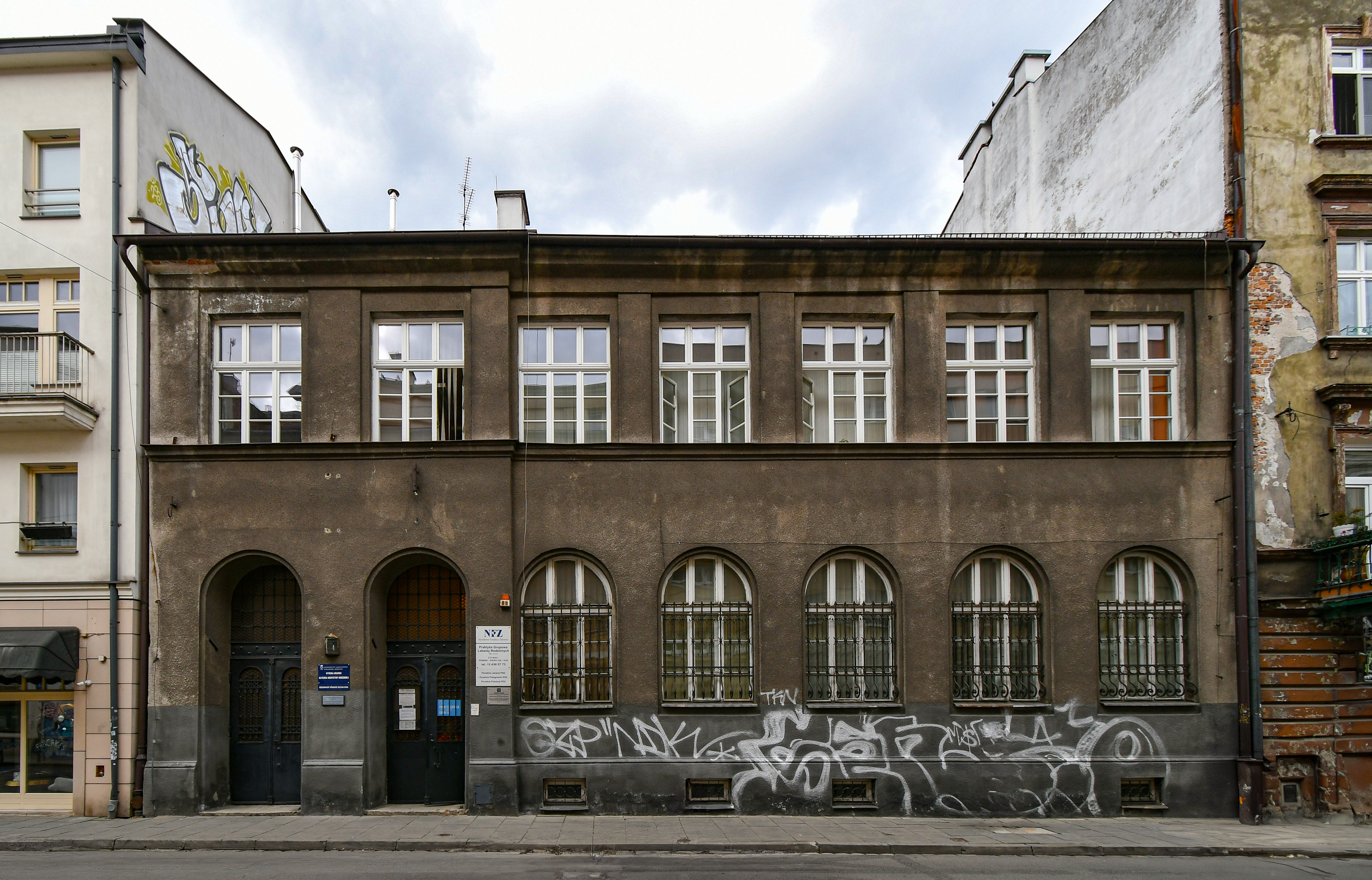
Sheerit B'nei Emunah Beit Midrash
4 Bocheńska Street

=== Synagogues in other districts of Kraków ===
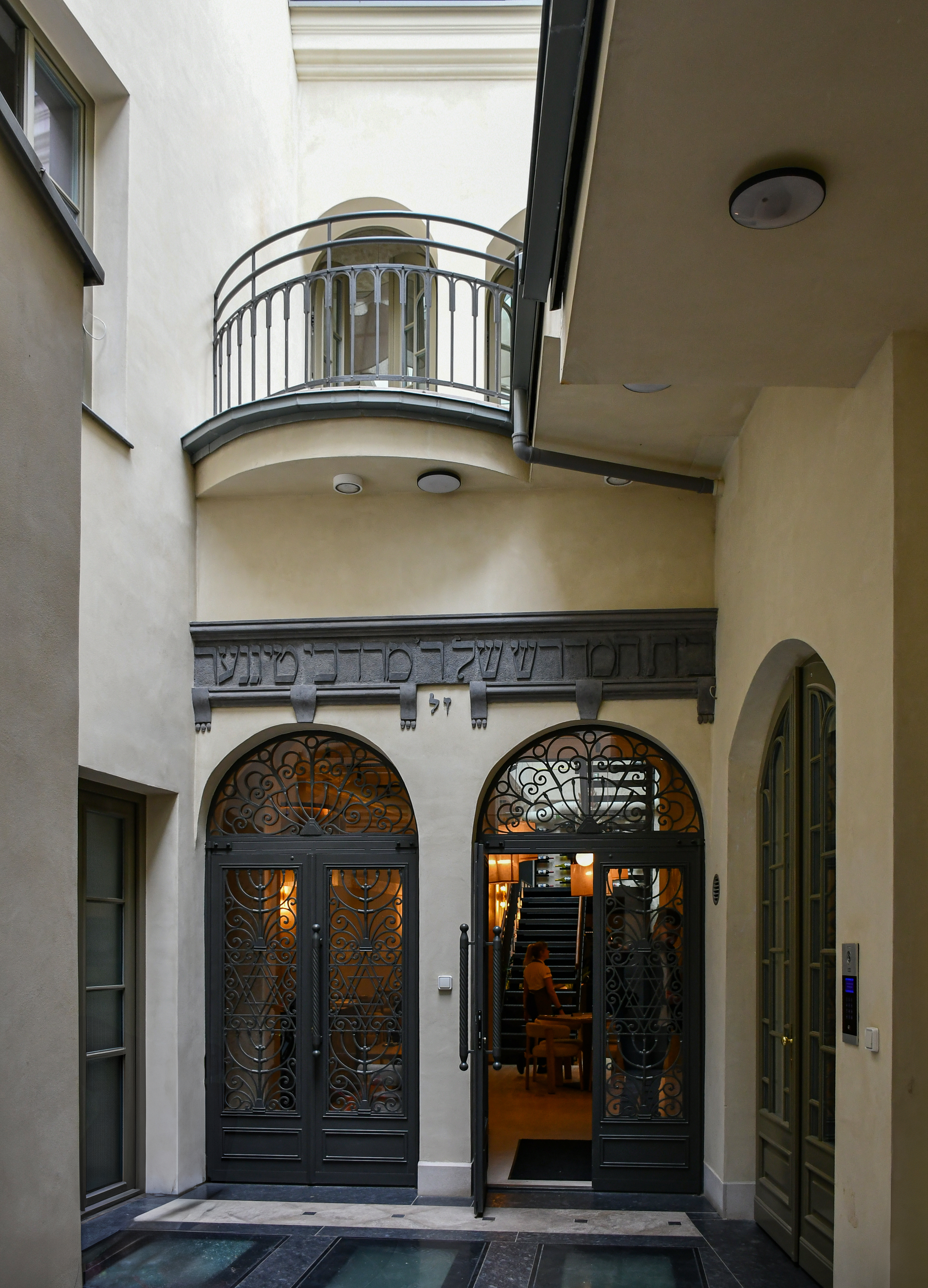
Mordechai Tigner Prayerhouse
Old Town, 28-30 Grodzka Street

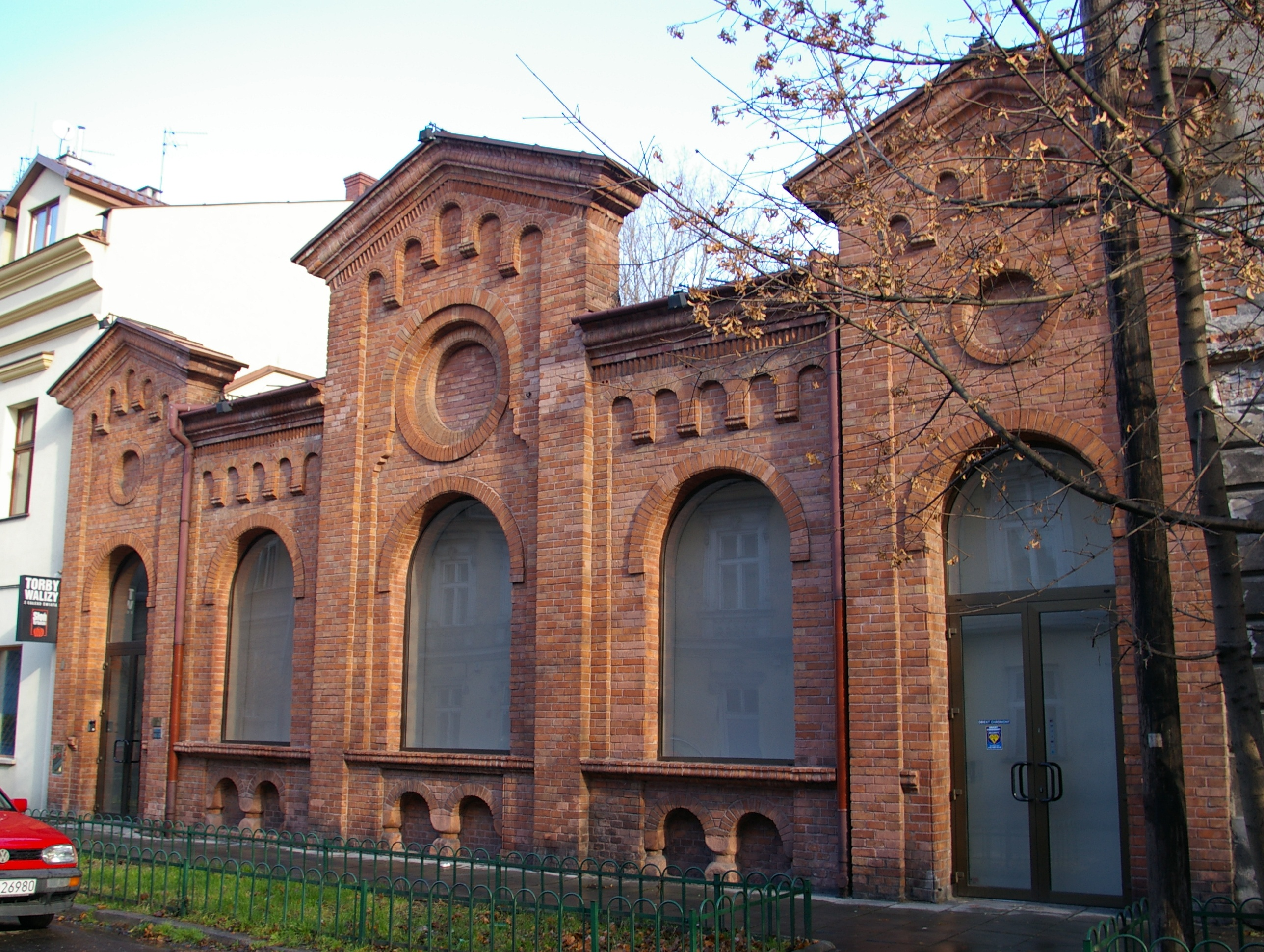
Zucker Synagogue
Podgórze, 5 Węgierska Street

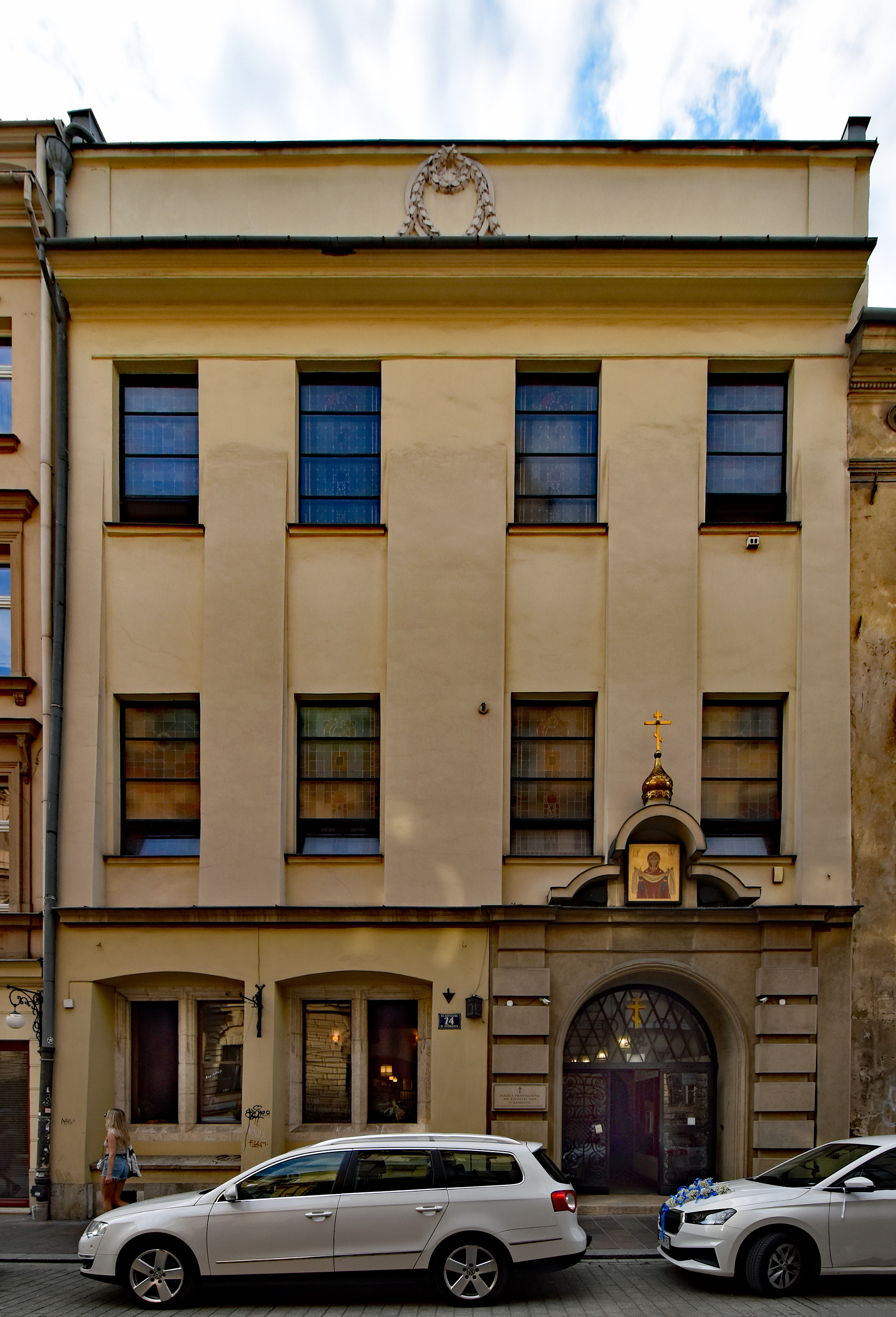
Ahawat Raim Synagogue
Old Town, 24 Szpitalna Street

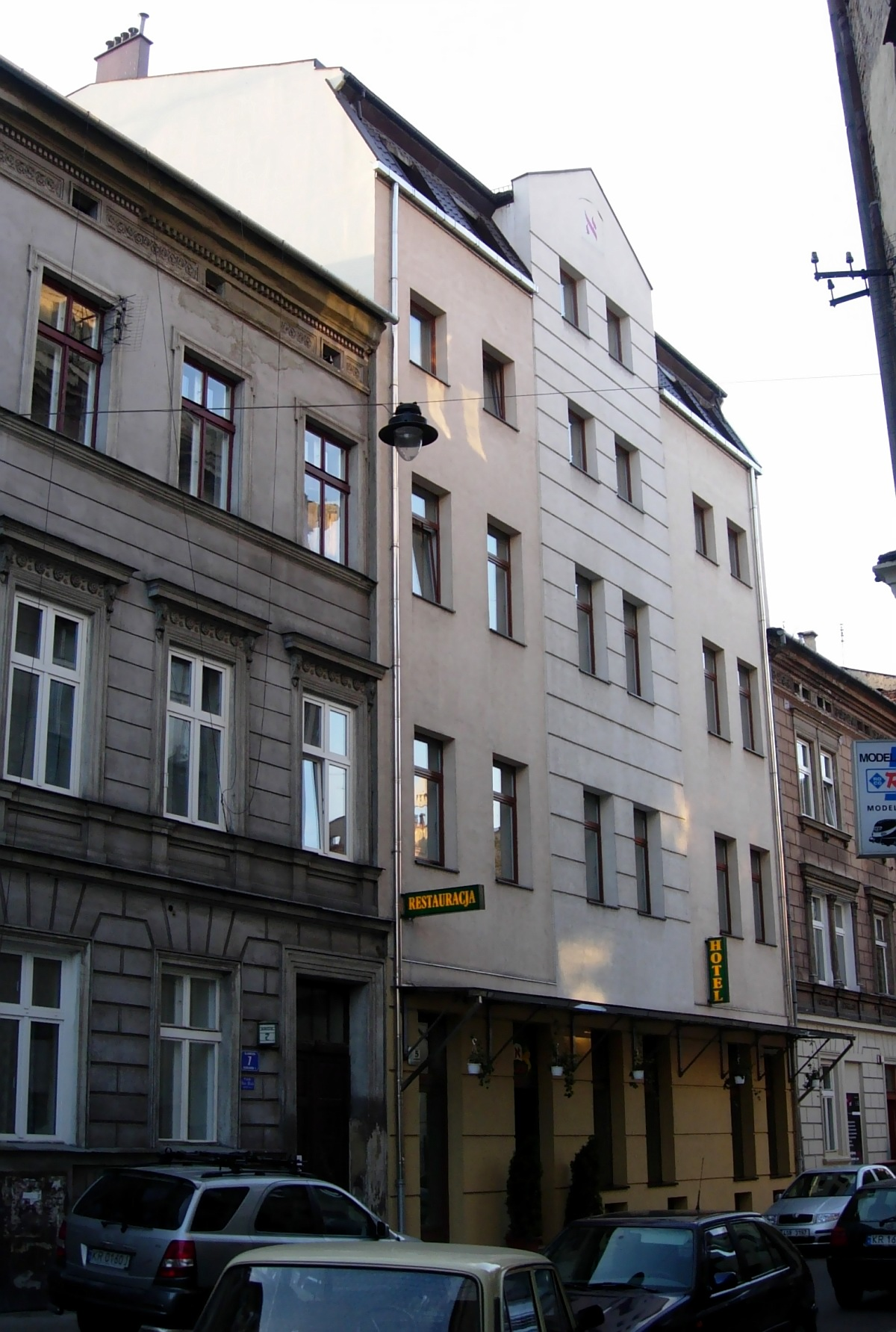
Cypres Prayerhouse
Stradom, 5 św. Agnieszki Street

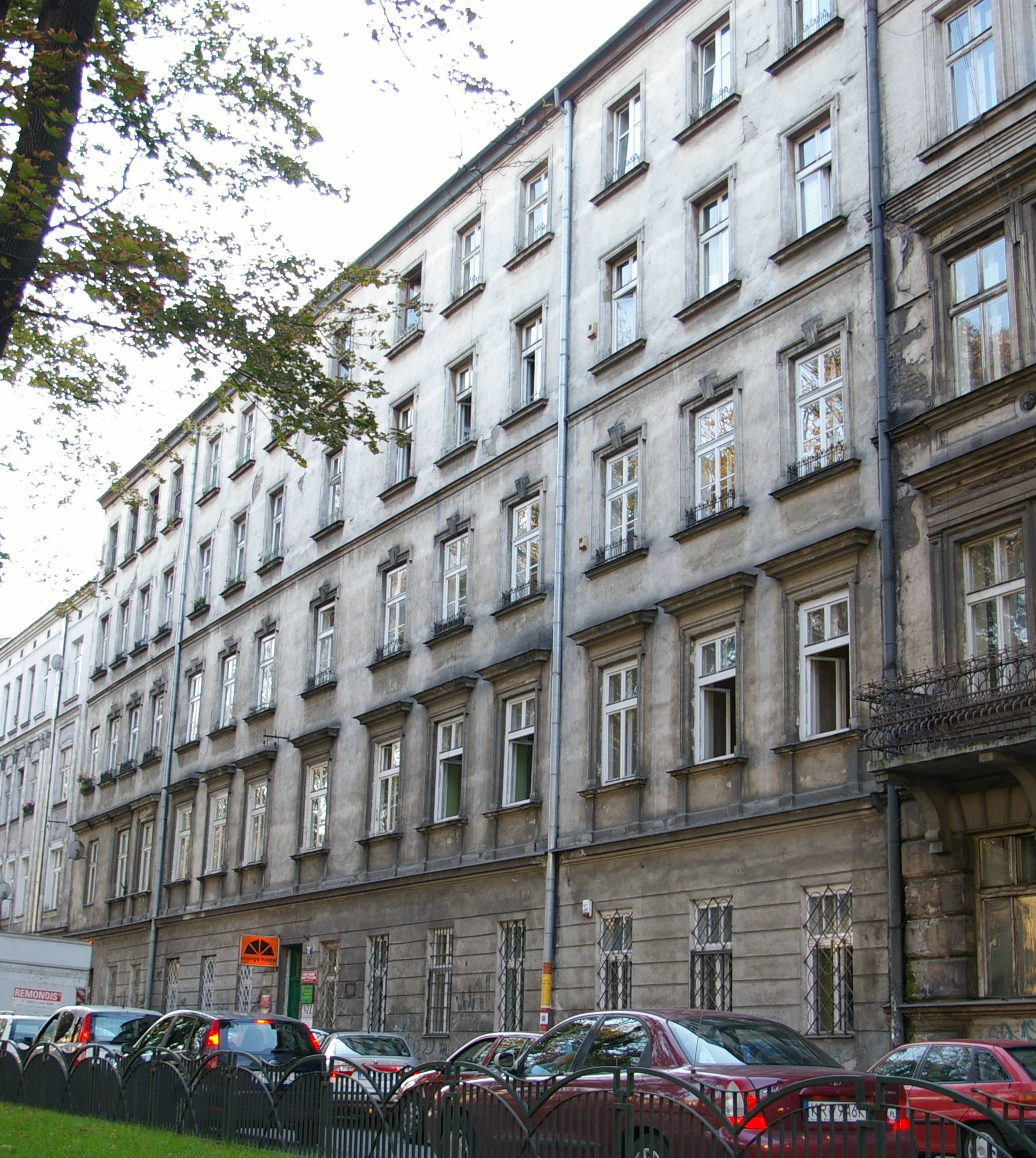
Damasz Prayerhouse
Stradom, 64 J. Dietl Street

== List of Kraków synagogues by street name ==
For list of Synagogues in alphabetical order, please use table-sort buttons.

#	Street	Synagogue
1	Św. Agnieszki 5	Cypres Hirsch Michael Synagogue (Stowarzyszenia Modłów i Dobroczynności)
2	Św. Agnieszki 11	Meisels Izrael Synagogue
3	Augustiańska 22/12	Beit Shlomo Synagogue
4	Augustiańska 22	Chasids from Radomsko Synagogue
5	Augustiańska 25	Tiferes Israel Synagogue
6	Bocheńska 4	Szejrit Bne Emun Synagogue
7	Bonifraterska 1	Bet Hamidrash Synagogue
8	Brzozowa 9	Ansche Chail Synagogue
9	Brzozowa 6	Deiches Salomon Synagogue
10	Brzozowa 17	Planczner Synagogue
11	Celna 5	Rabi Skawiński Synagogue
12	Ciemna 15	Chasids from Radomsko Synagogue
13	Ciemna 17	Chewra Sandlers Synagogue
14	Dębnicki Square (pl. Dębnicki 6)	Jedność Izraela Synagogue
15	Dietla 17	Chasids from Działoszyce Synagogue
16	Dietla 58	Chajotim Synagogue
17	Dietla 64	Damash Synagogue
18	Dietla 64	Chasids from Piaseczno Synagogue
19	Dietla 107	Bet Hamidrash Synagogue
20	Długa 22	Dorshe Shalom Synagogue
21	Długa	Grosmann Synagogue
22	Estery 6	Chasids from Czortków Synagogue
23	Estery 6	Chasids from Dzikowo Synagogue
24	Estery 6	Talmud Torah Synagogue
25	Estery 6	Chasids from Góra Kalwaria Synagogue
26	Estery 12	Bobov Synagogue
27	Estery 12	Chaim Halberstam Synagogue
28	St Gertrudy 20	Lejw Tojw Synagogue
29	Grodzka 28	Tigner Mordechaj Synagogue
30	Izaaka 7	Chewra Szijur Synagogue
31	Izaaka 7	Dajons Majer Synagogue
32	Izaaka 5	Stowarzyszenia Bóżniczego Szir (Szijer) Synagogue
33	Jakuba 21	Mosi Hamite Synagogue
34	Jakuba ?	Ansche Emes Synagogue
35	Józefa 8	Aufim Synagogue
36	Józefa 22	Ahawat Tora Synagogue
37	Józefa 24	Chasids from Stropkowo Synagogue
38	Józefa 5	Chewra Kadisza Synagogue
39	Józefa 32	Chewra Ner Tamid (High) Synagogue
40	Józefa 12	Etz Chaim Synagogue
41	Józefa 42	Kowea Itim le-Tora Synagogue
42	Józefa 16	Kromol Synagogue (annex)
43	Józefa 16	Krymałowska Synagogue
44	Józefa 22	Machsike Jesziwa Keter (Kejser) Tora Synagogue
45	Józefa 33	Reb Aron Klaus Synagogue
46	Józefa 15	Chasids from Radom Synagogue (New) (Stowarzyszenia Modlitwy i Dobroczynności)
47	Józefa 26	Chasids from Żarki Synagogue
48	Józefa 37	Epsztein Aron Synagogue
49	Kalwaryjska 21	Chewra Thilim Synagogue
50	Kalwaryjska 21	Nose Hamitah Synagogue
51	Kalwaryjska 26	Rabi from Zielin Synagogue
52	Kalwaryjska 29	Gmilus Chasudim & Menachem Aweilim Synagogue
53	Katarzyny 5	Chasids from Husiatyń Synagogue
54	Kościuszki 27	Bet Hamidrash Synagogue
55	Krakowska 7	Bojaner Synagogue
56	Krakowska 21	Chewra Sandlers Synagogue
57	Krakowska 26	Bojaner Synagogue
58	Krakowska	Gmilus Chasudim Talmud Tora Synagogue
59	Krakowska 51	Joller Synagogue
60	Krakowska 29	Meisels Berisch Synagogue
61	Krakowska 13	Susser Leib Synagogue
62	Krakowska 21	Tomchej Orajse Synagogue
63	Krakusa 7	Rabinacka Synagogue
64	Kupa 16	Ner Tamid Synagogue
65	Kupa 16	Mizrahi Synagogue
66	Lelewela 5 (later Tatarska 4)	Bnei Jeszurim Synagogue
67	Limanowskiego 13	Bikur Cholim Synagogue
68	Matejki Square (pl. Matejki 4)	Bet Hamidrash Synagogue
69	Matejki Square 2	Adas Jeszurim Synagogue
70	Mazowiecka	Bet Hamidrash Synagogue
71	Meiselsa 14	Aleksander Synagogue
72	Meiselsa 17 (pl. Nowy 5)	Bnej Emun Synagogue
73	Meiselsa 18	Chewra Thilim Synagogue
74	Meiselsa 14	Chasids from Aleksandrowo Synagogue
75	Meiselsa 32	Lykower Synagogue
76	Meiselsa 1	Tycziner Synagogue
77	Miodowa 11	Assiriri (Machsi Ke-Choklim) Synagogue
78	Miodowa 15	Beit (Bet) Israel Synagogue
79	Miodowa 13	Chasids from Cieszanowo Synagogue
80	Miodowa 12	Temichas Narej Bnej Israel Synagogue
81	Mostowa 8	Chana and Abraham Lednitzer Synagogue
82	Mostowa 2	Nosei Massu Haszejno Synagogue
83	Na Przejściu 2/77 (Dajwór 23)	Gewoha Bargiel Synagogue Na Górce
84	Nowy Square 1 (pl. Nowy 1)	Chaduzim Synagogue
85	Nowy Square 7	Chowewe Tora Synagogue
86	Podbrzezie 4	Horowitz Aszer Synagogue
87	Podbrzezie 6	Mcyjrim Imizgagim jad Charucium Synagogue
88	Podbrzezie 6	Reichenberg Chaim (from Zaleszczyki) Synagogue
89	Podbrzezie 6	Rosenbaum Synagogue
90	Podgórski Square (pl. Podgórski 3)	Benzion Halberstam Synagogue
91	K. Brodzinskiego 8	Schornstein Synagogue
92	Prądnik Czerwony	Landesdorfer Synagogue
93	Rakowicka 14	Bejt Jehuda Synagogue
94	Rękawka 30	Anszei Chail Synagogue
95	Skałeczna 3	Bach Synagogue
96	Skawińska 2	Synagogue in Jewish Hospital
97	Starowiślna 37	Agudas Achim Synagogue
98	Stroma 11	Bikur Cholim Synagogue
99	Szeroka 16	Ner Tamid Synagogue
100	Szeroka 40	Ner Tamid Synagogue
101	Szeroka 28	Gmilus Chasidim Debais Hakneses Synagogue (Stara)
102	Szeroka 2	Landau Szaul Synagogue
103	Szeroka 40	Mekarwin Latora Synagogue
104	Szeroka 28	Reichenberg Synagogue
105	Szeroka 25	Szezarim Synagogue
106	Szeroka 24	Szomrim Laboker Synagogue
107	Szeroka 24	Szywe Kryjim Synagogue
108	Szewska 1/2	Chasids from Bobowa Synagogue
109	Szlak 13	Merkaz Jeszyja Synagogue
110	Szpitalna 24	Ahawas Rajim Synagogue (now Eastern Orthodox church)
111	Tatarska 4	Bnei Jeszurim Synagogue
112	Trynitarska 18	Bet Hamidrash Synagogue
113	Twardowskiego 15	Ansche Emes Synagogue
114	Warszauera 8	Ner Tamid Synagogue
115	Warszauera 1	Zauwche Zywche Cedek Synagogue
116	Św. Wawrzyńca 9	Ahawat Szalom Synagogue
117	Węgierska 6	Bnei Emun Synagogue
118	Węgierska 6	Bnei Chinim Synagogue
119	Węgierska	Zucker Synagogue (Podgórze)
120	Węgierska 7	Chasids from Góra Kalwaria Synagogue
121	Węgierska 7	Benzion Halberstam Synagogue
122	Węgłowa 3	Chasids from Bełz Synagogue
123	Wolnica Square (pl. Wolnica 14)	Chasids from Husiatyn Synagogue
124	Zwierzyniec 21	Cendeszim Synagogue
#	Street	As per Krakow.Jewish.org.pl

== See also ==
- New Jewish Cemetery, Kraków
- Remuh Cemetery, Kraków
