= Kowea Itim le-Tora Synagogue =

Former synagogue now apartment complex, in Kraków, Poland

- Polish: Synagoga Kowea Itim le-Tora
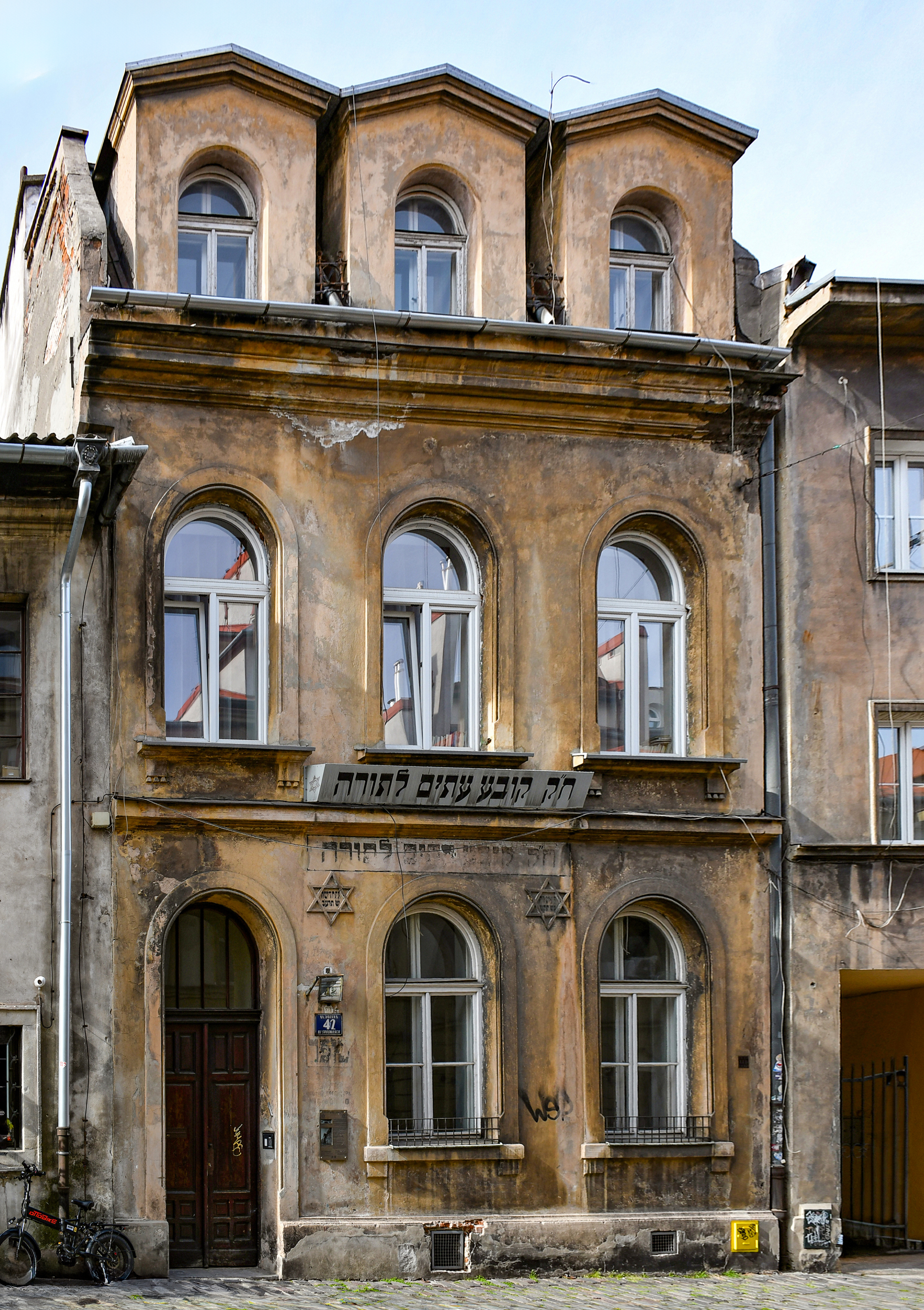
- The former synagogue in 2025

- Location of the former synagogue, now apartment complex, in Lesser Poland Voivodeship

Religion
- Affiliation: Orthodox Judaism (former)
- Rite: Nusach Ashkenaz
- Ecclesiastical or organizational status: Synagogue (1810–c. 1939); Profane use (????–????); Residential (since ????)
- Status: Inactive (as a synagogue); Repurposed

Location
- Location: 42 Józefa Street; Kazimierz, Kraków
- Country: Poland
- Interactive map of Kowea Itim le-Tora Synagogue
- Coordinates: 50°03′05.1″N 19°56′51.7″E

Architecture
- Architect: Łazarz Rock (1912)
- Type: Synagogue architecture
- Style: Romanesque Revival (1912)
- Completed: 1810; 1912 (remodelled)
- Materials: Brick

The Kowea Itim le-Tora Synagogue (Polish: Synagoga Kowea Itim le-Tora) was an Orthodox Jewish congregation and synagogue, located at 42 Józefa Street, in Kazimierz, Kraków, in the Lesser Poland Voivodeship of Poland. The congregation was known as the Society for Torah Study.

The synagogue was built in 1810 and was re-modelled by Łazarz Rock in the Romanesque Revival style in 1912. The synagogue was devastated by the Nazis during World War II.

After the war, for some time it housed a shelter for displaced persons of the Social Welfare Department of the Provincial Jewish Committee. The building now serves as a residential apartment building.

== See also ==
- History of the Jews in Poland
- List of active synagogues in Poland
- Synagogues of Kraków
