= High Synagogue =

High Synagogue may refer to:

- High Synagogue (Kraków)
- High Synagogue (Prague)
