= Church of St. Barbara, Kraków =

Roman Catholic church in Kraków, Poland

Church of St. Barbara
- Kościół św. Barbary
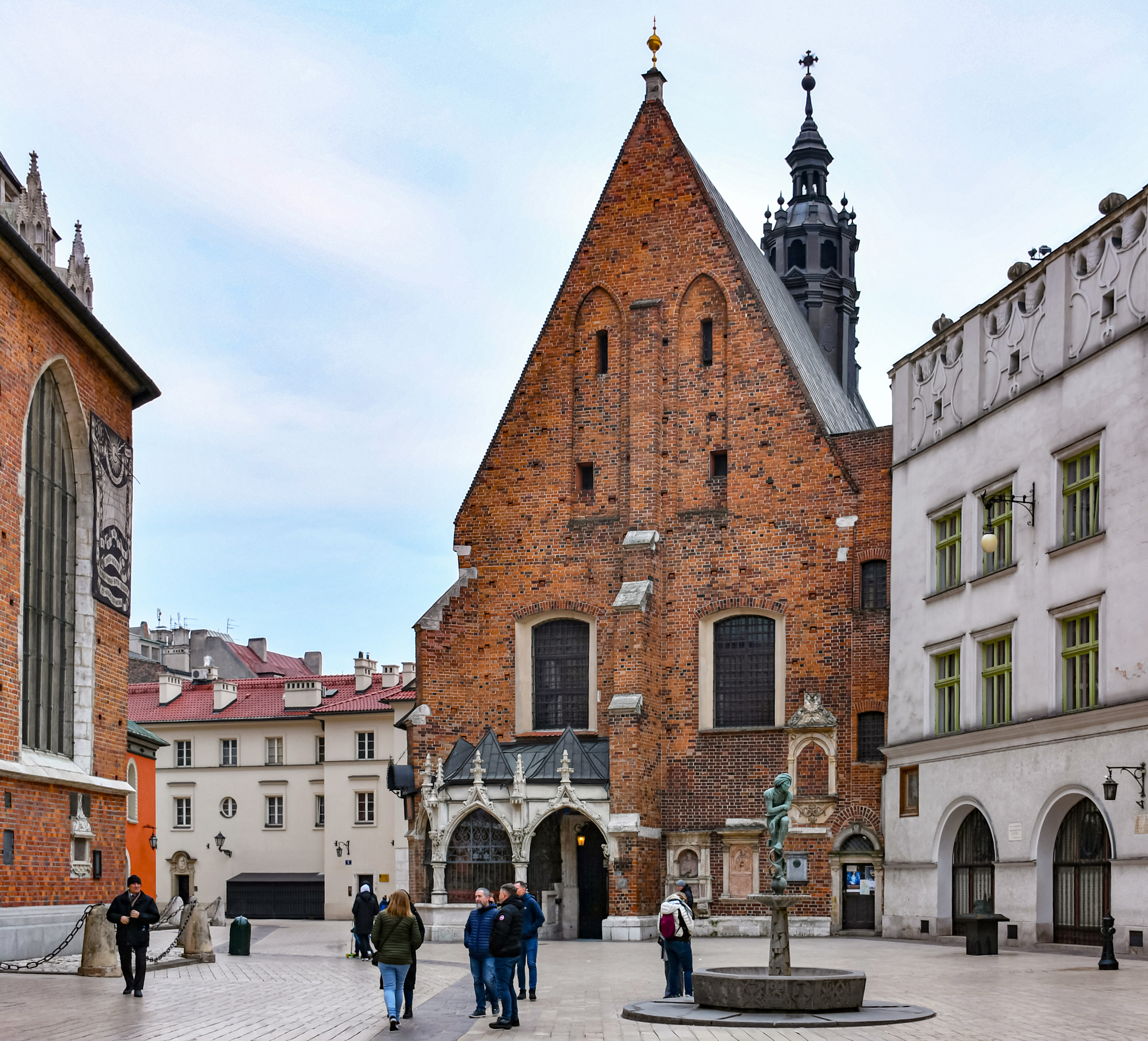
- View from Mariacki Square (from the west)
- Church of St. Barbara
- 50°03′40.7″N 19°56′23.5″E
- Location: Kraków
- Address: 9 Little Market Square
- Country: Poland
- Denomination: Roman Catholic
- Website: swietabarbara.jezuici.pl

History
- Consecrated: 14th century

UNESCO World Heritage Site
- Type: Cultural
- Criteria: iv
- Designated: 1978
- Part of: Historic Centre of Kraków
- Reference no.: 29
- Region: Europe and North America

Historic Monument of Poland
- Designated: 1994-09-08
- Part of: Kraków historical city complex
- Reference no.: M.P. 1994 nr 50 poz. 418

The Church of St. Barbara (Polish: Kościół św. Barbary), is a historic Roman Catholic conventual church of the Jesuits located at 9 Little Market Square in Old Town of Kraków, Poland.

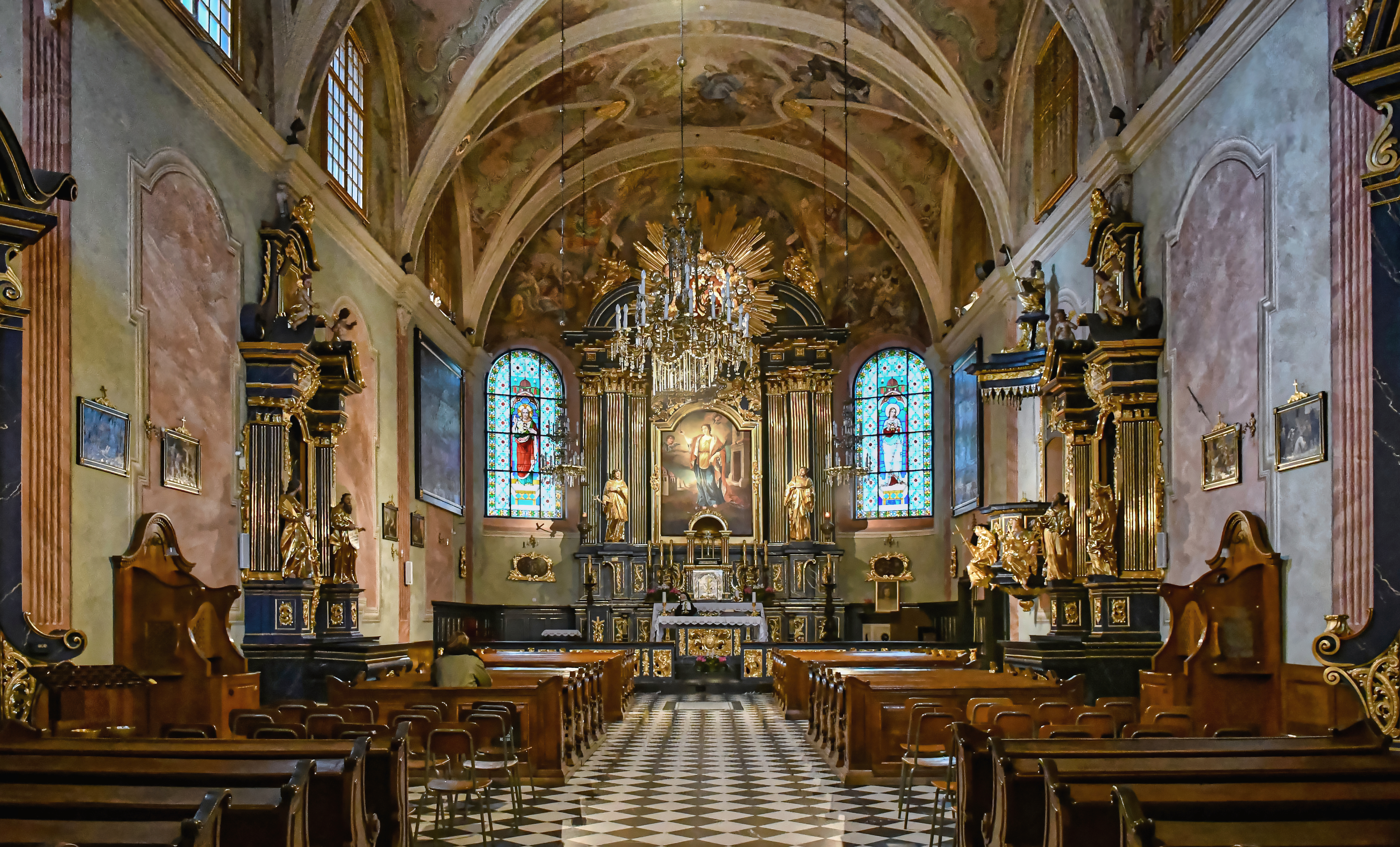
Interior of the church

== Bibliography ==
- (in Polish) Michał Rożek, Barbara Gądkowa Leksykon kościołów Krakowa, Wydawnictwo Verso, Kraków 2003, ISBN 83-919281-0-1 pp 22-23 (Lexicon of Kraków churches)
- (in Polish) Praca zbiorowa Encyklopedia Krakowa, wydawca Biblioteka Kraków i Muzeum Krakowa, Kraków 2023, ISBN 978-83-66253-46-9 volume I page 740 (Encyclopedia of Kraków)
