= Historic Centre of Kraków =

Part of the city of Kraków, Poland

UNESCO World Heritage Site
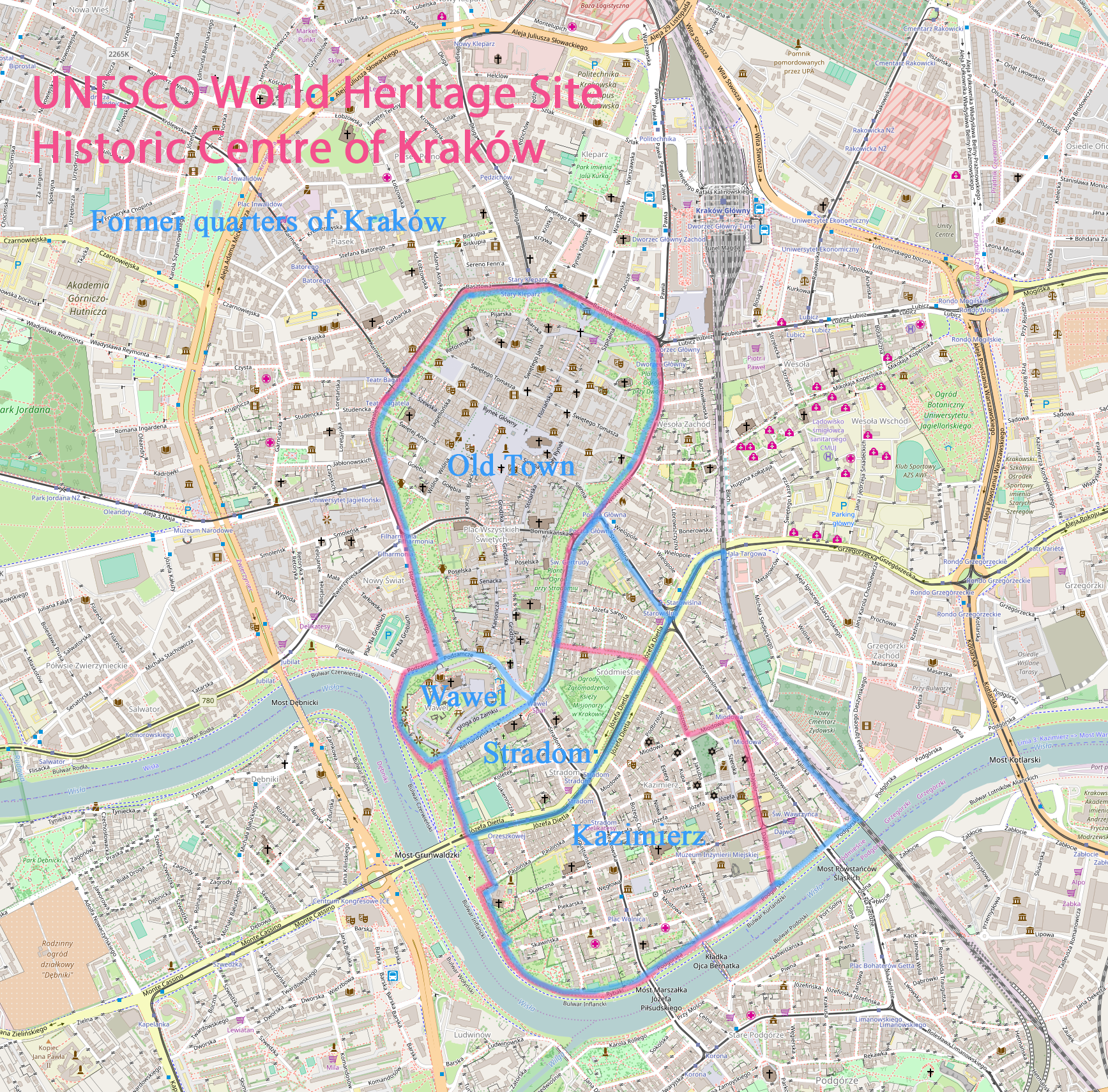
- Interactive map of Historic Centre of Kraków
- Location: Kraków; Poland
- Criteria: Cultural: (iv)
- Reference: 29bis
- Inscription: 1978 (2nd Session)
- Extensions: 2010
- Area: 149.65 ha (369.8 acres)
- Buffer zone: 907.35 ha (2,242.1 acres)
- Coordinates: 50°03′16″N 19°56′17″E

Designations

Historic Monument of Poland
- Designated: 1994-09-08
- Part of: Kraków historical city complex
- Reference no.: M.P. 1994 nr 50 poz. 418

The Historic Centre of Kraków (Polish: Historyczne Centrum Krakowa) is a UNESCO World Heritage Site in Kraków, Poland.

The historic center of Kraków consists of four former quarters.

== Old Town ==
Kraków Old Town is the historic, oldest part of the city of Kraków within the Planty Park, to 1954 quarter of the city.

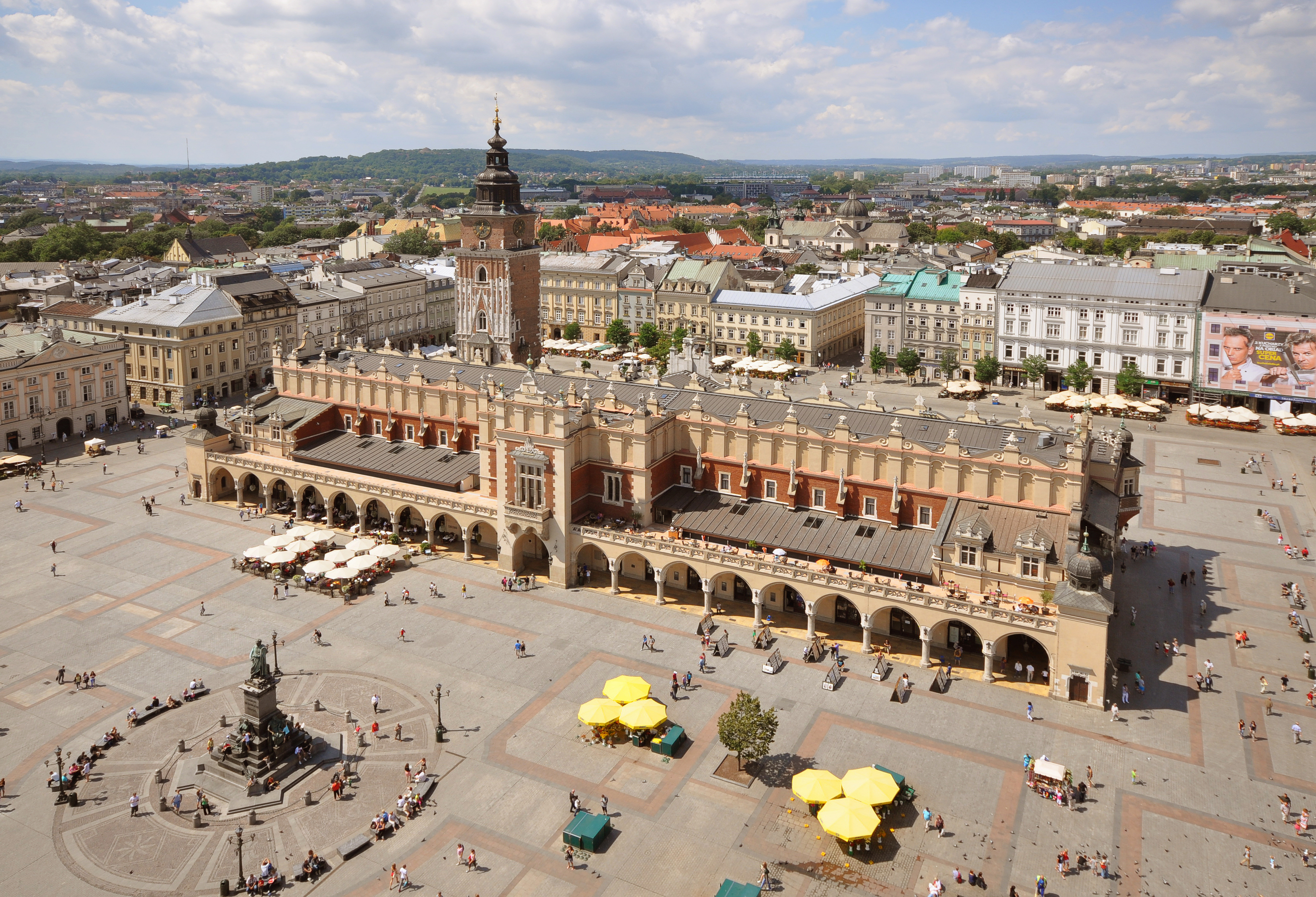
Main Market Square, Cloth Hall and Town Hall Tower

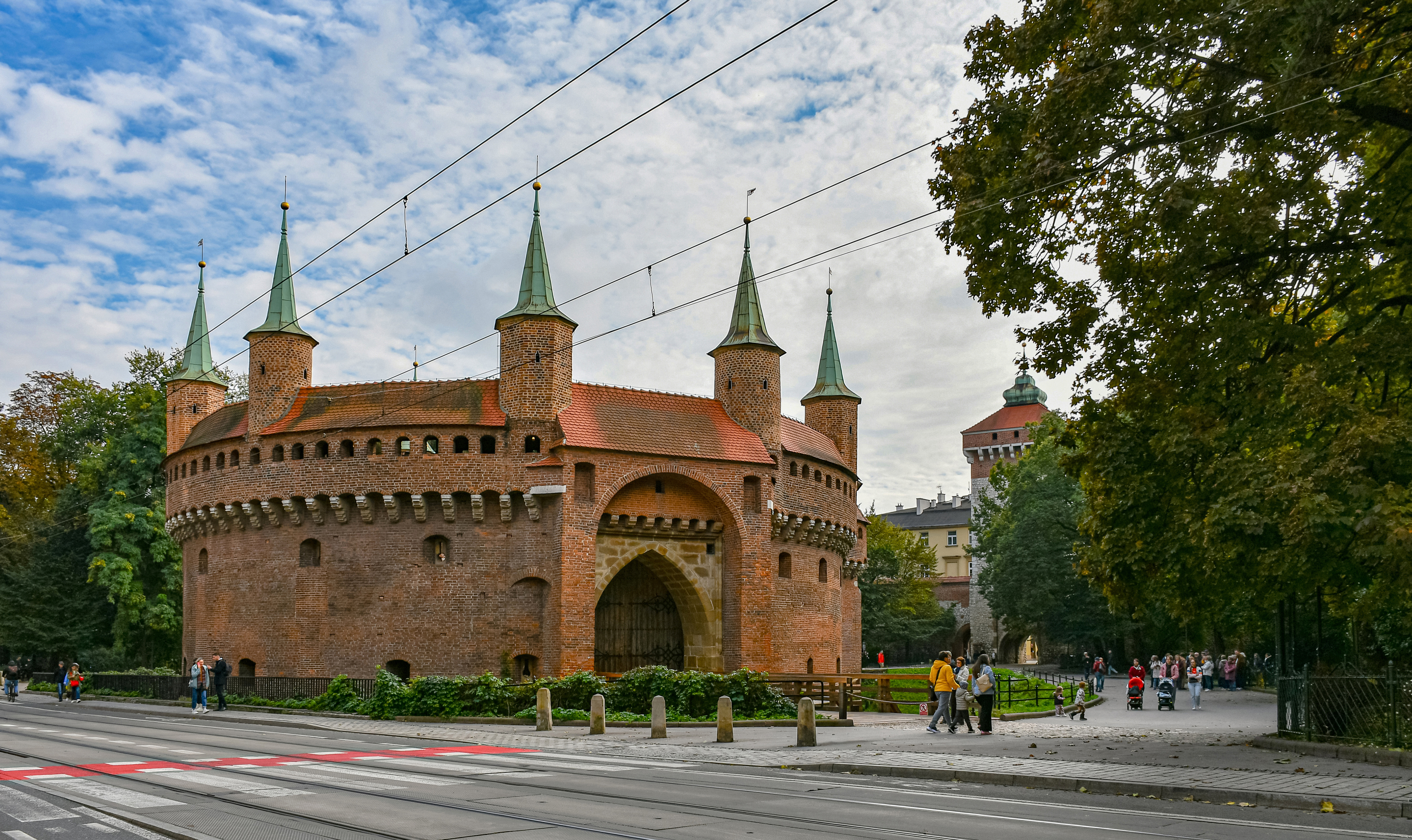
Kraków Barbican

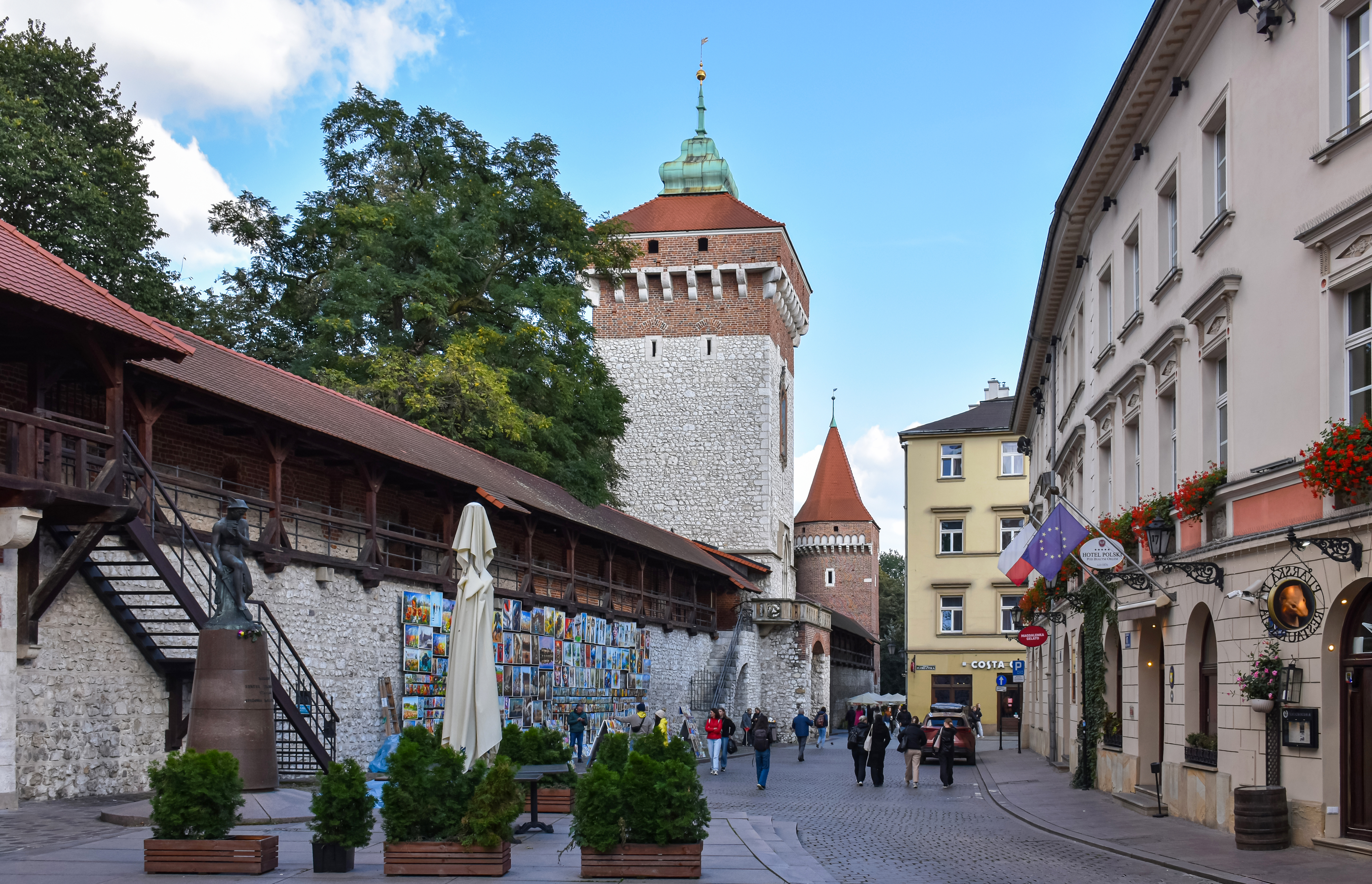
Pijarska Street and preserved part of the city's medieval defensive walls.

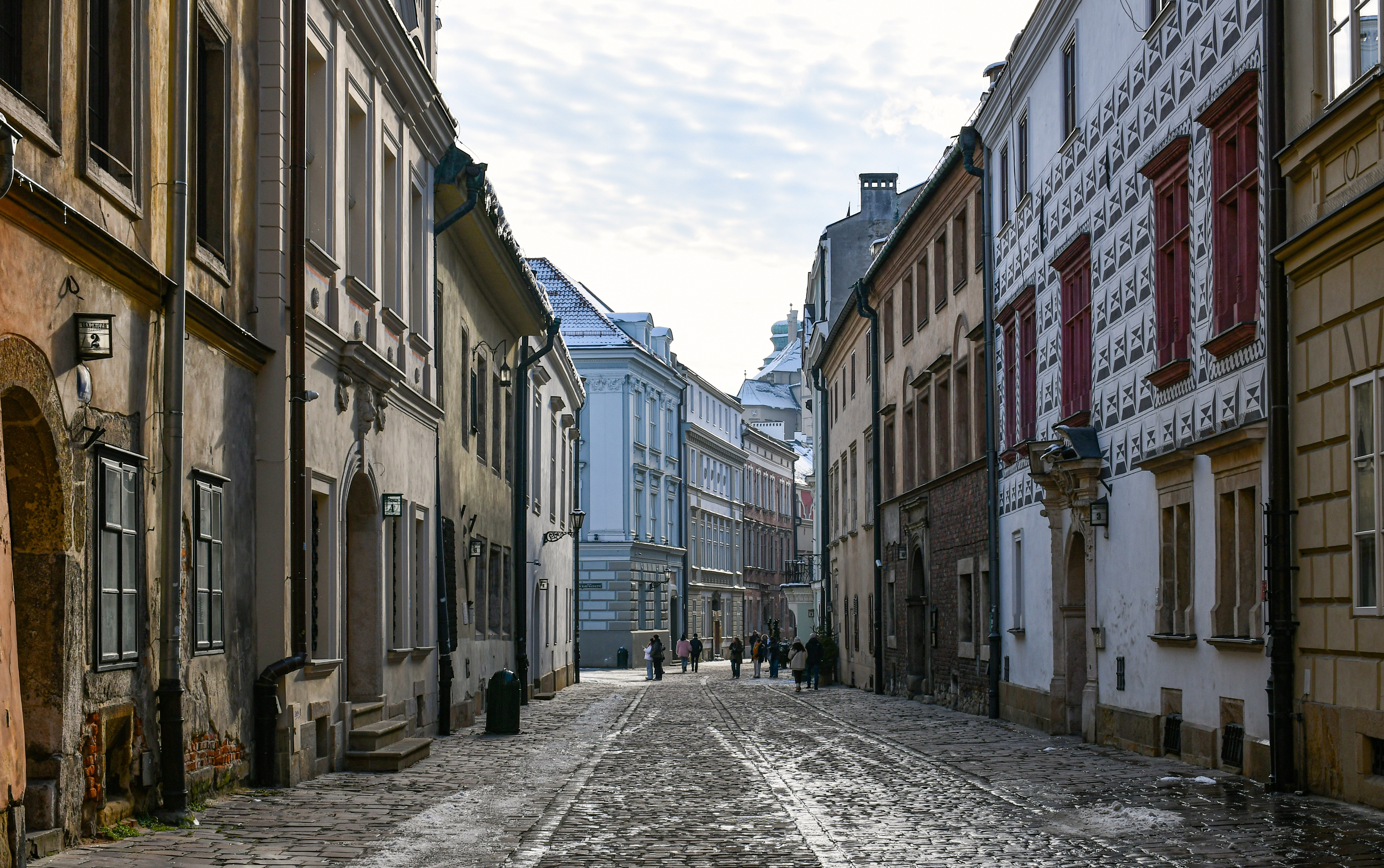
Kanonicza Street
the oldest street in the city

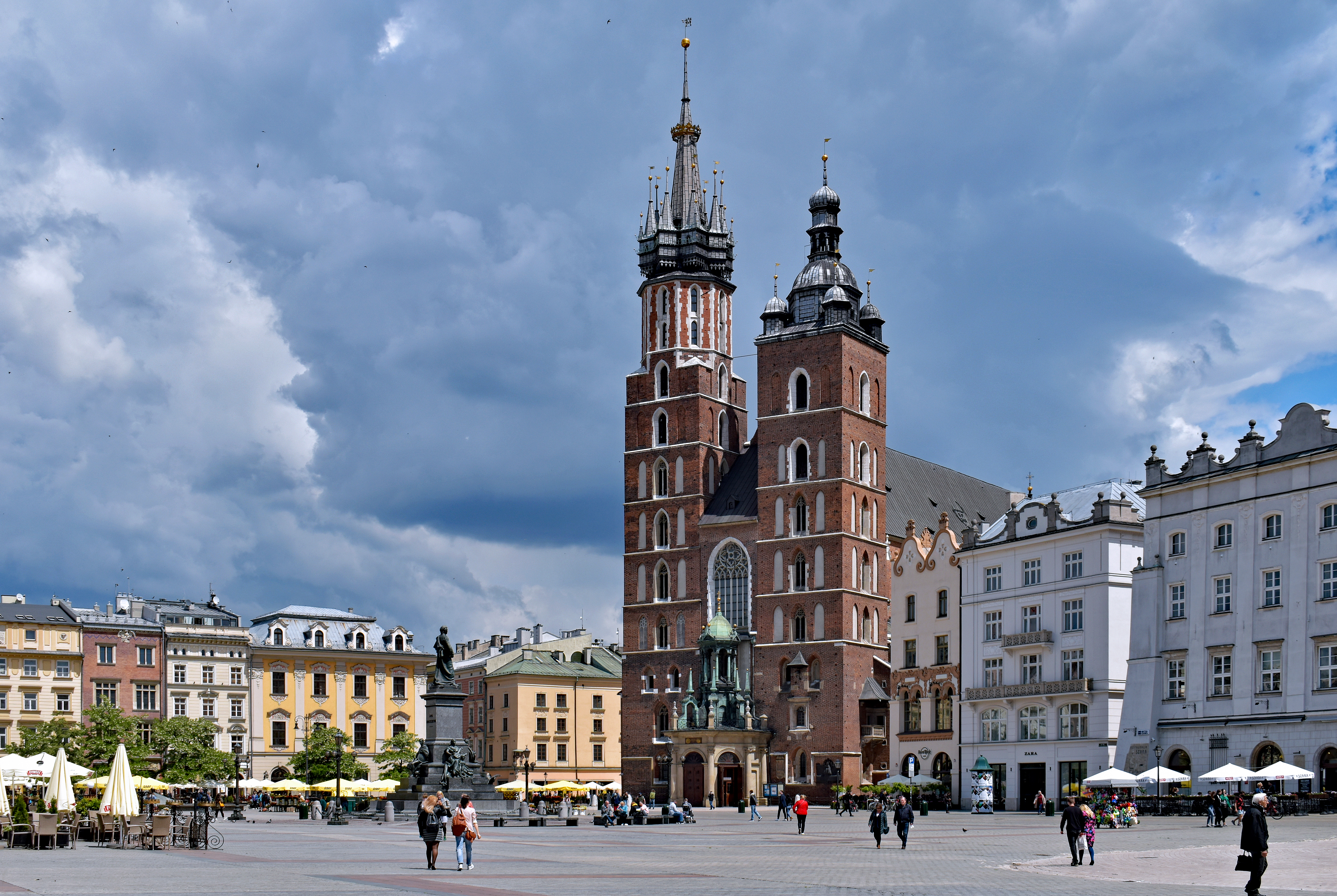
St. Mary's Church

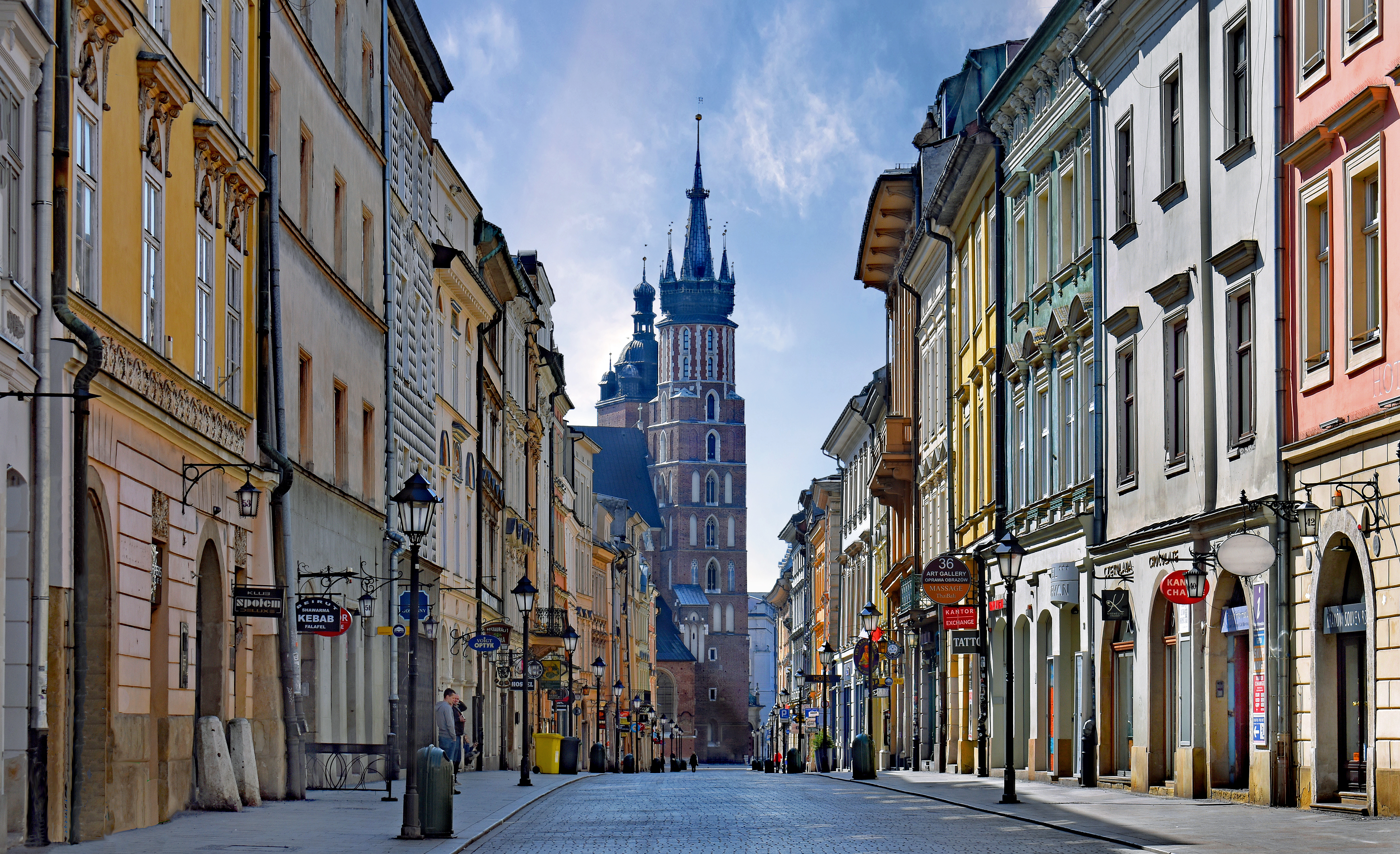
Floriańska Street

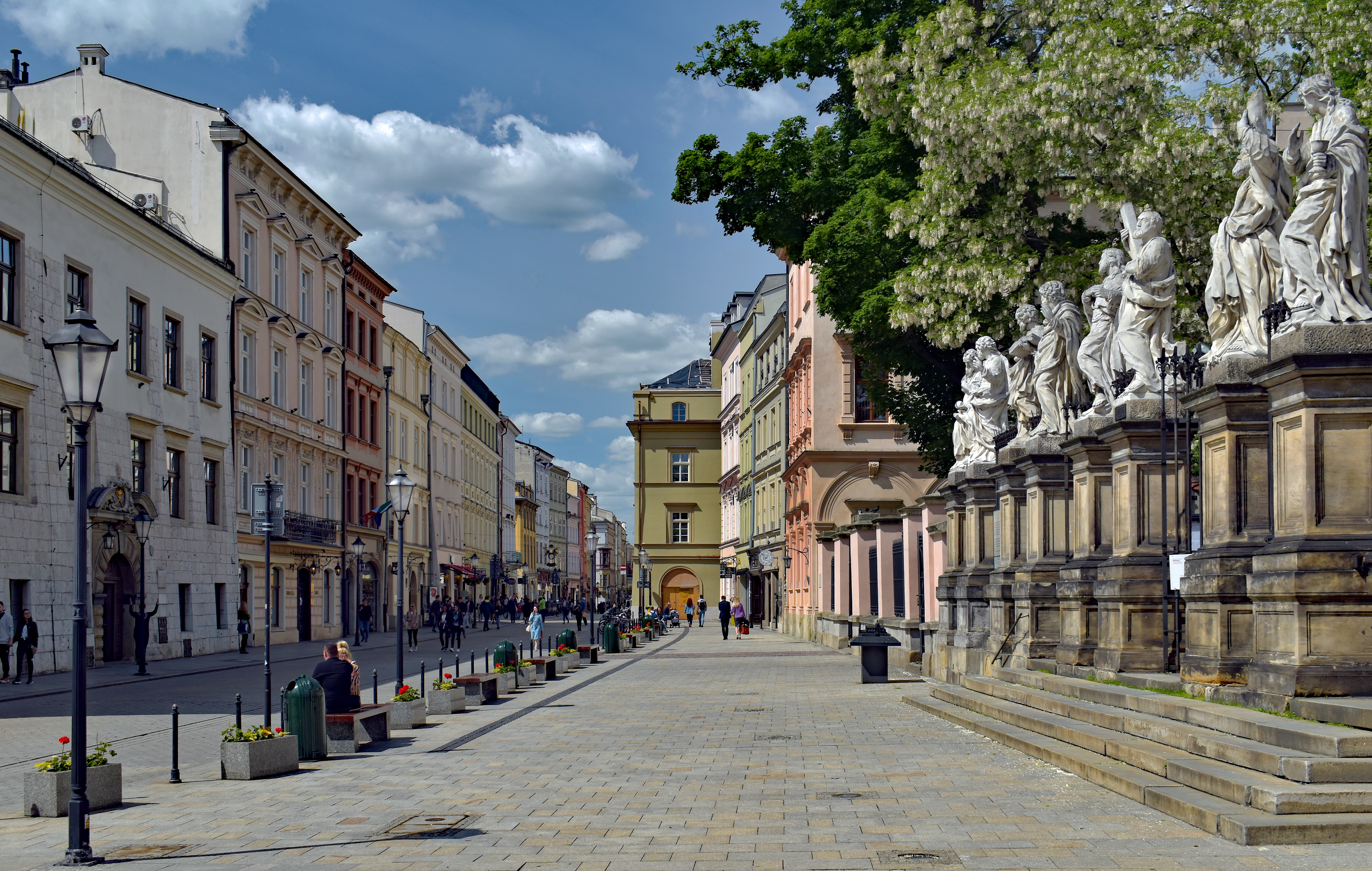
Grodzka Street

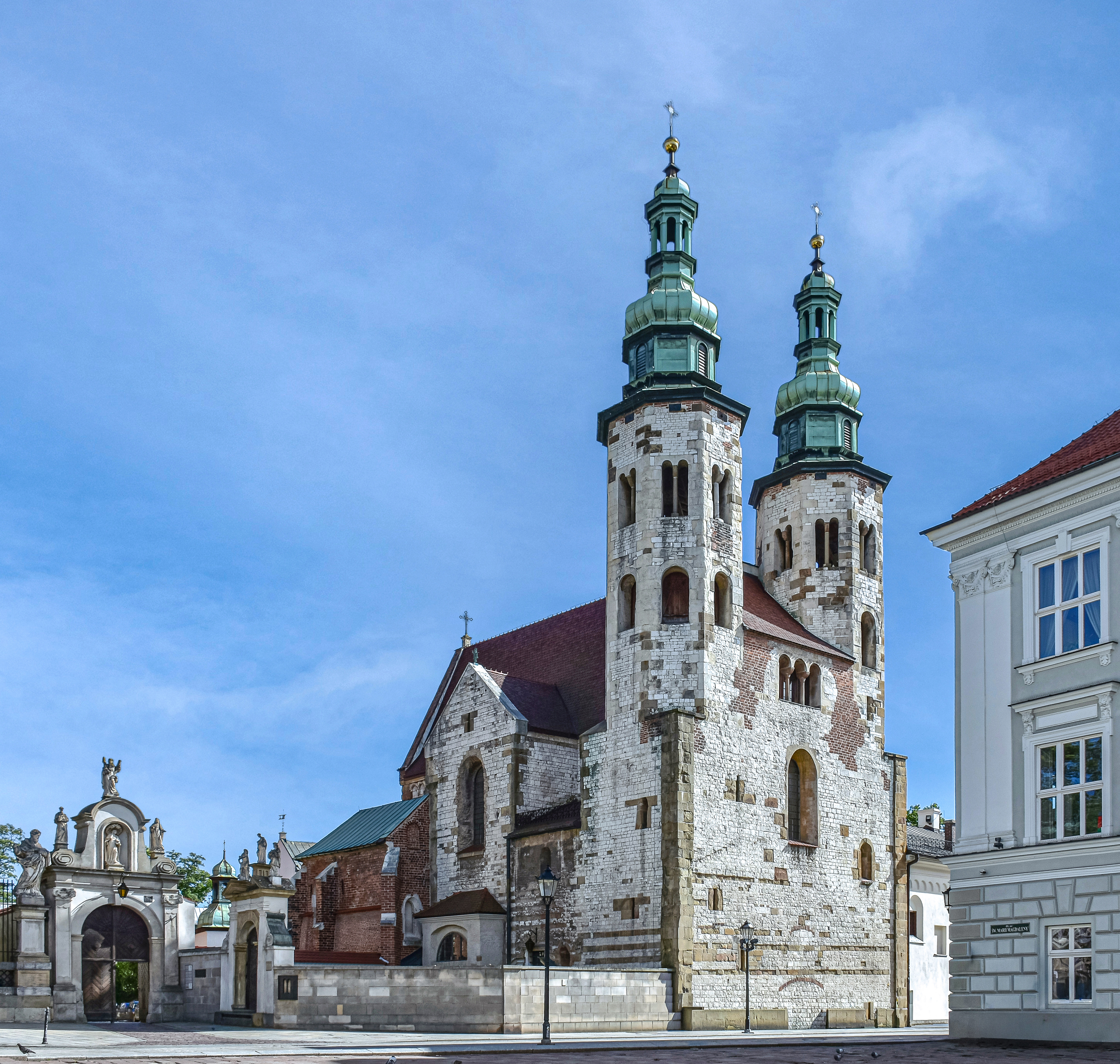
Church of St. Andrew

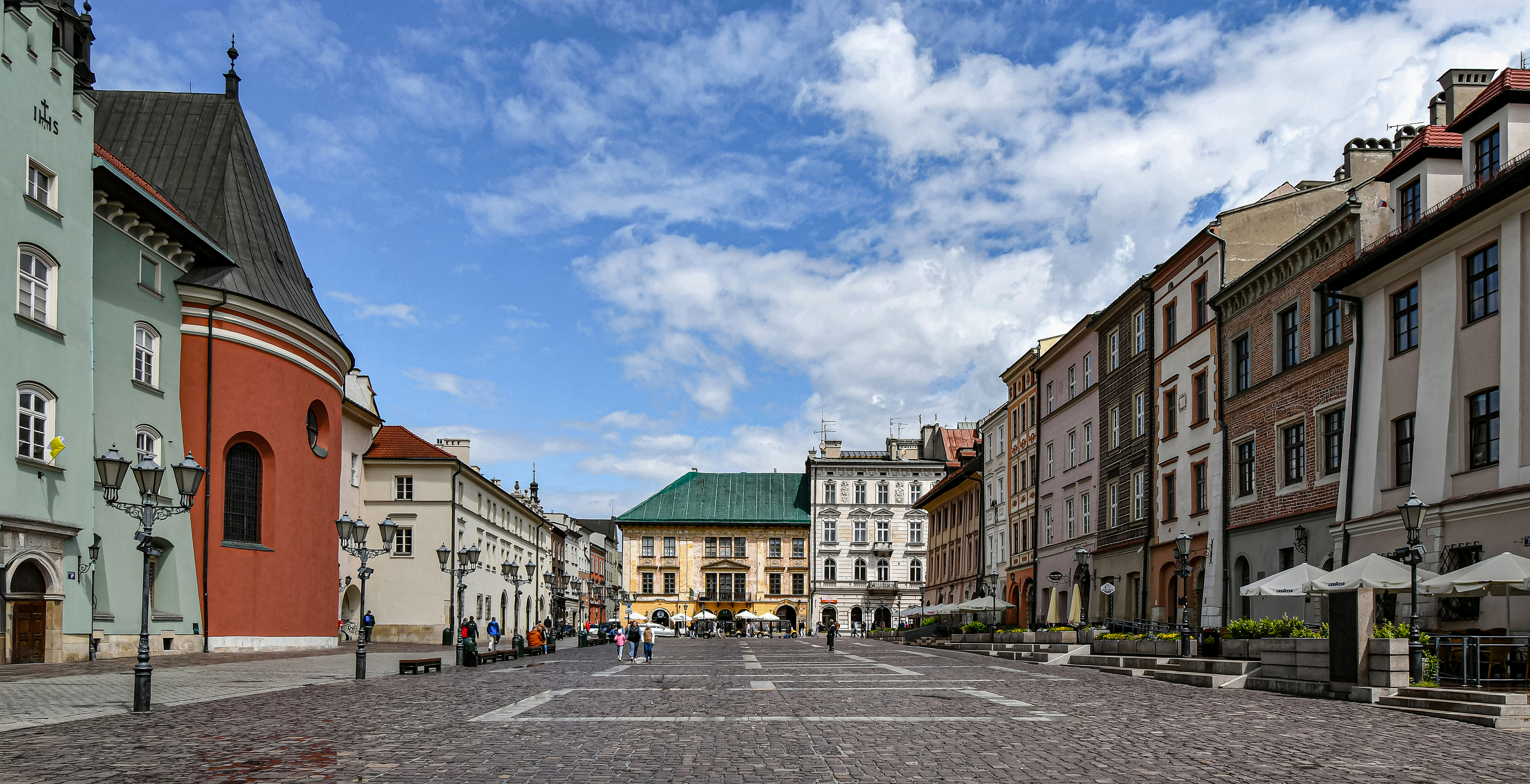
Little Market Square

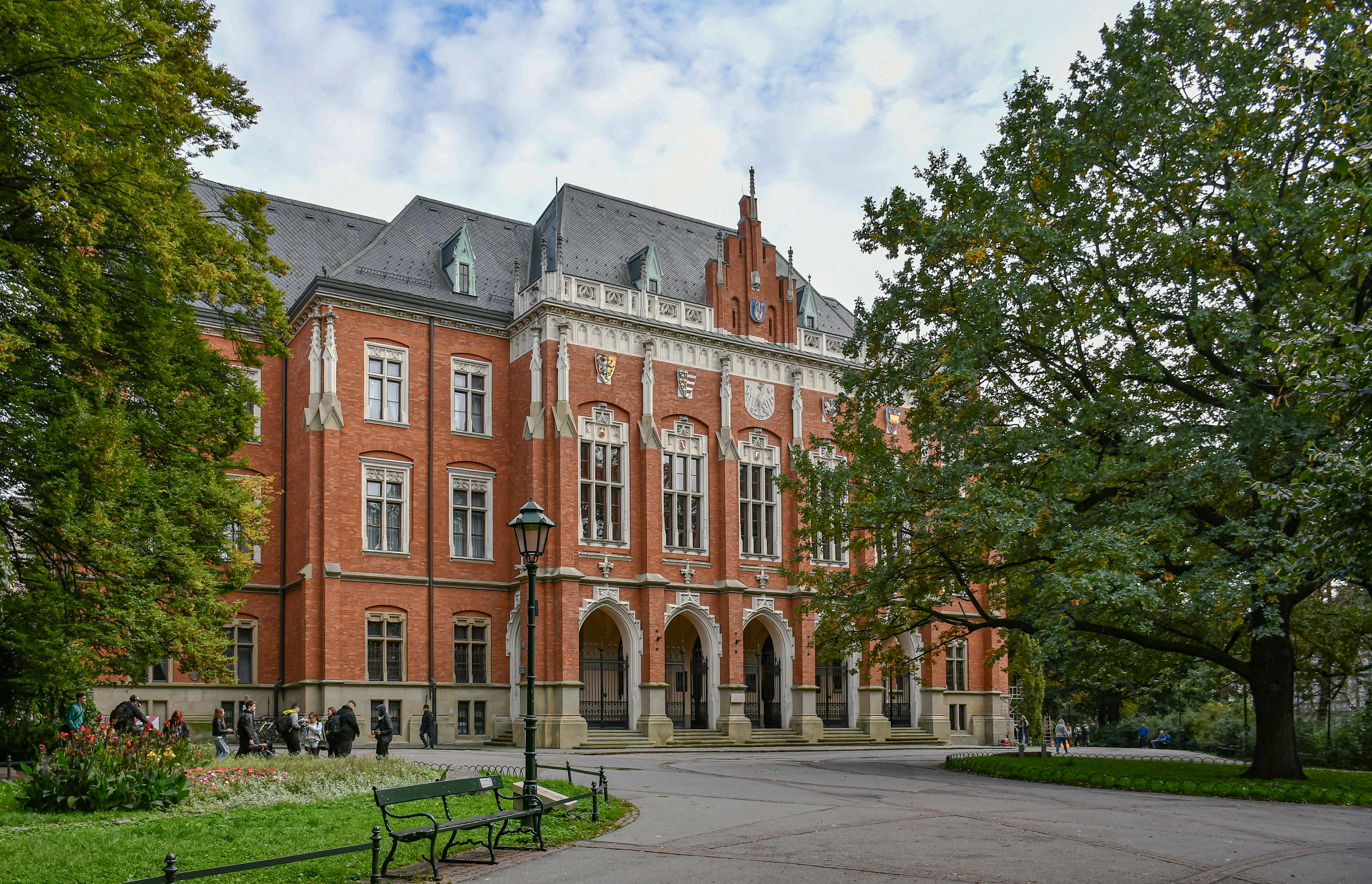
Jagiellonian University
Collegium Novum

== Wawel ==
Wawel Hill with the Royal Castle and Cathedral, to 1954 quarter of the city.

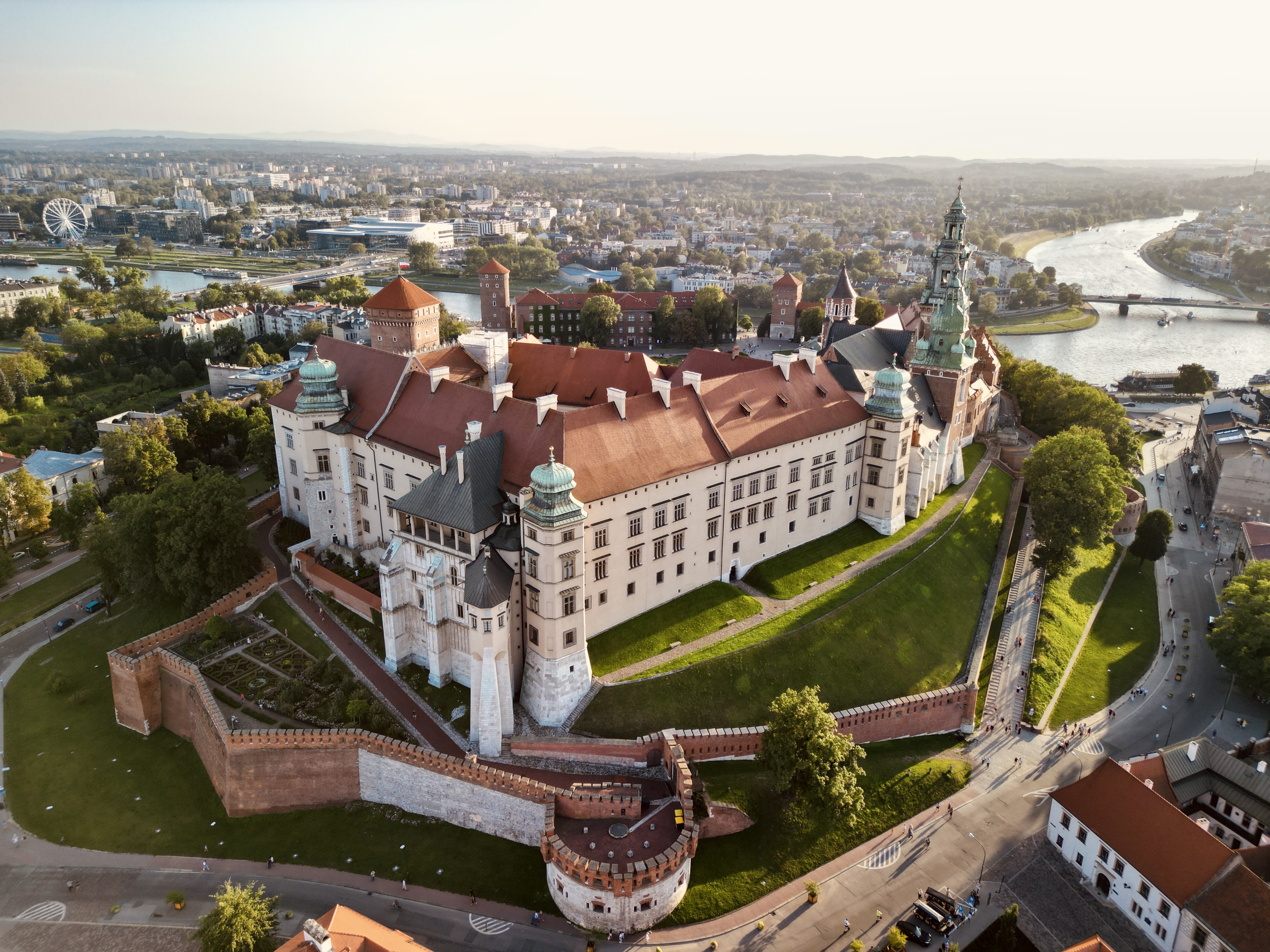
Wawel Royal Castle

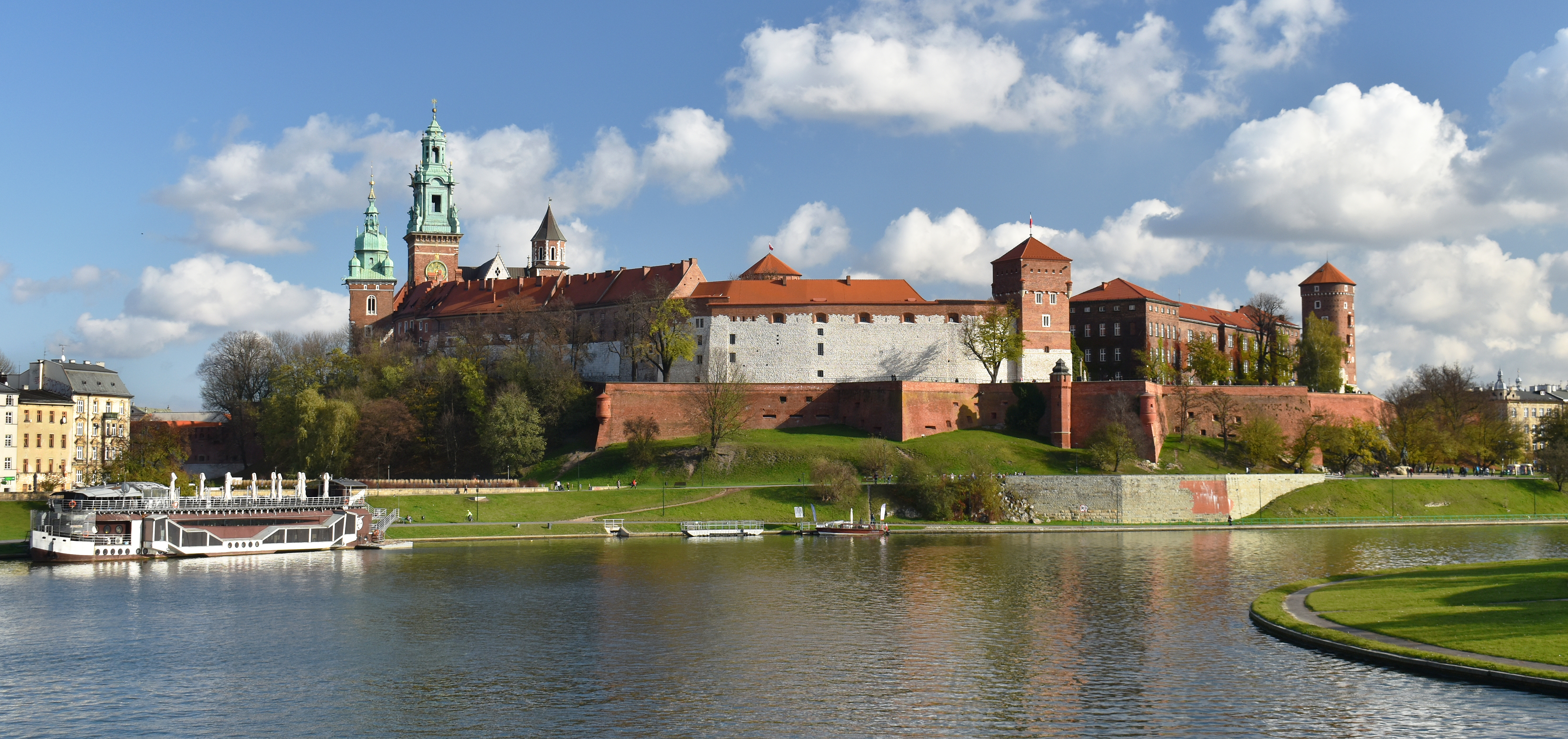
Wawel Hill

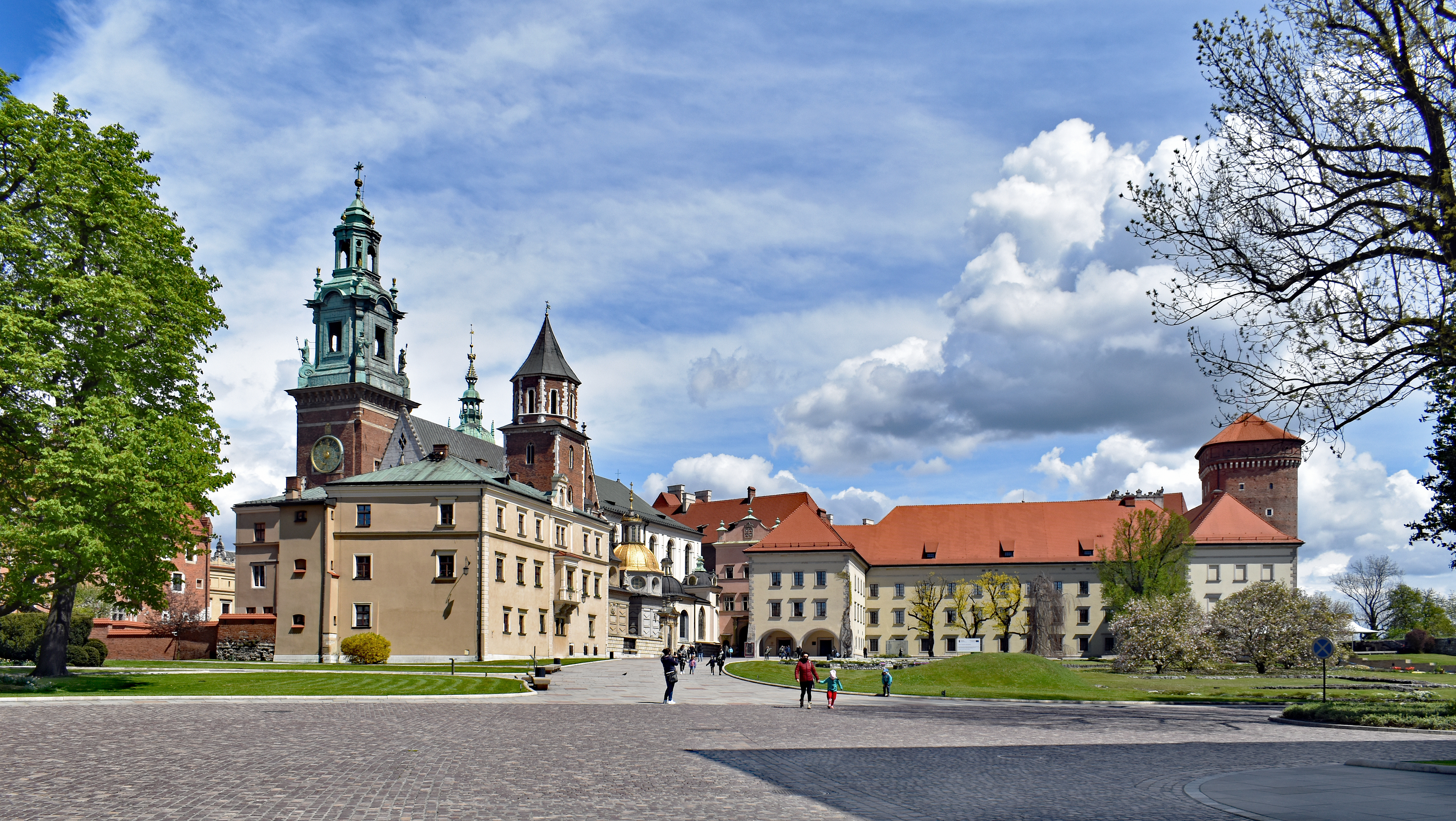
Outer courtyard

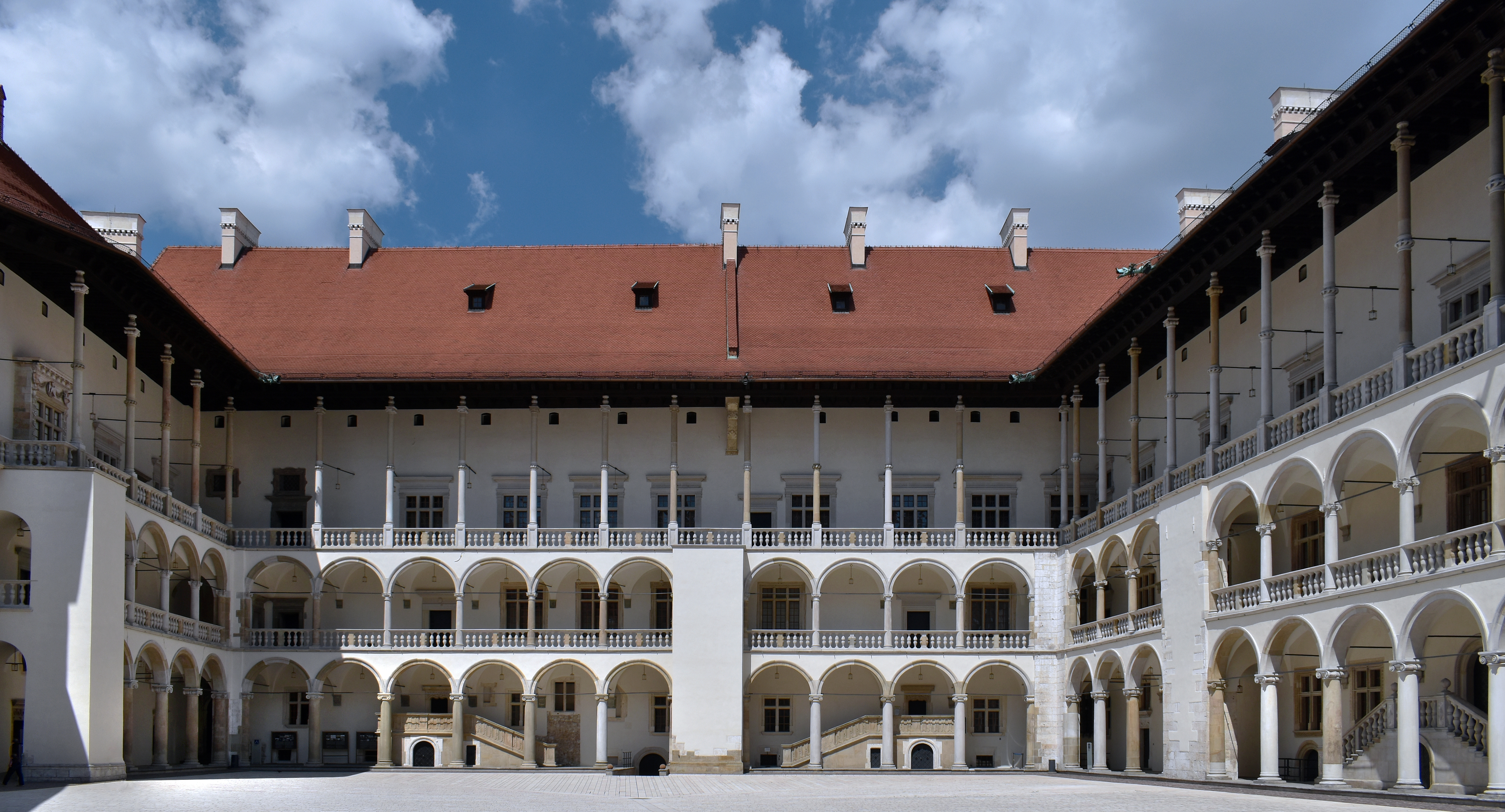
Wawel Royal Castle arcade courtyard

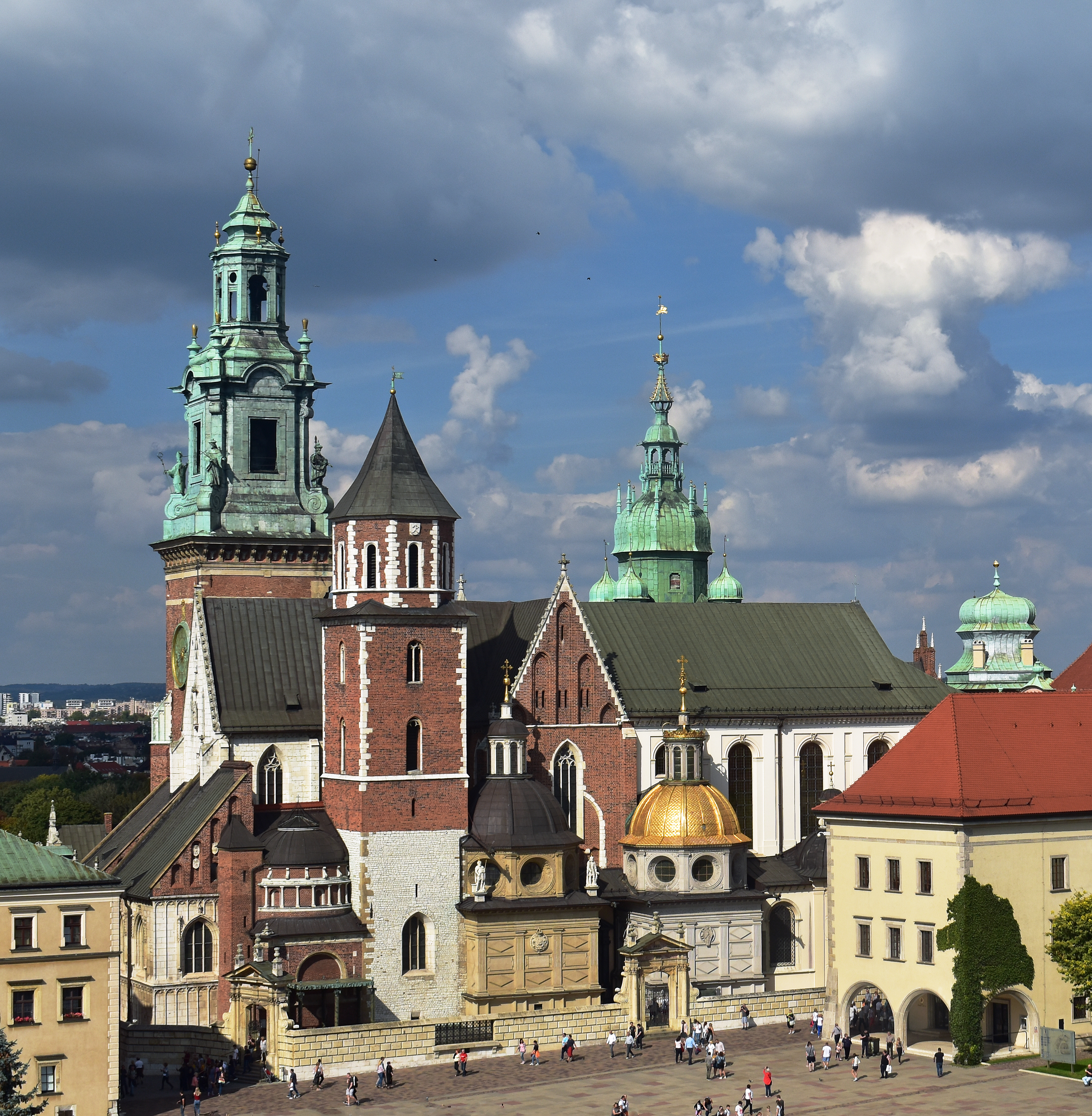
Church of St. Stanislaus and St. Wenceslaus

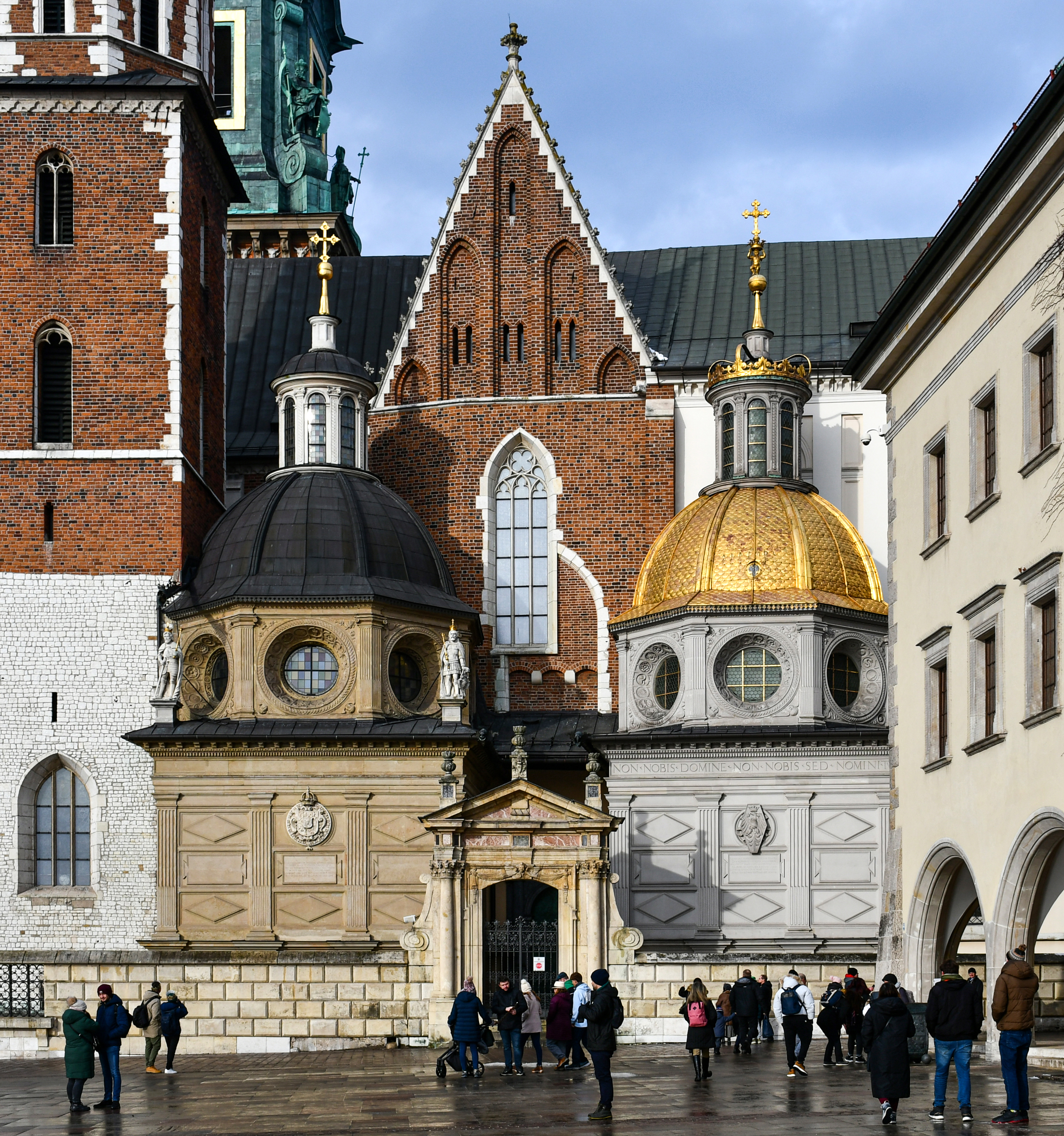
Vasa Chapel and Sigismund's Chapel

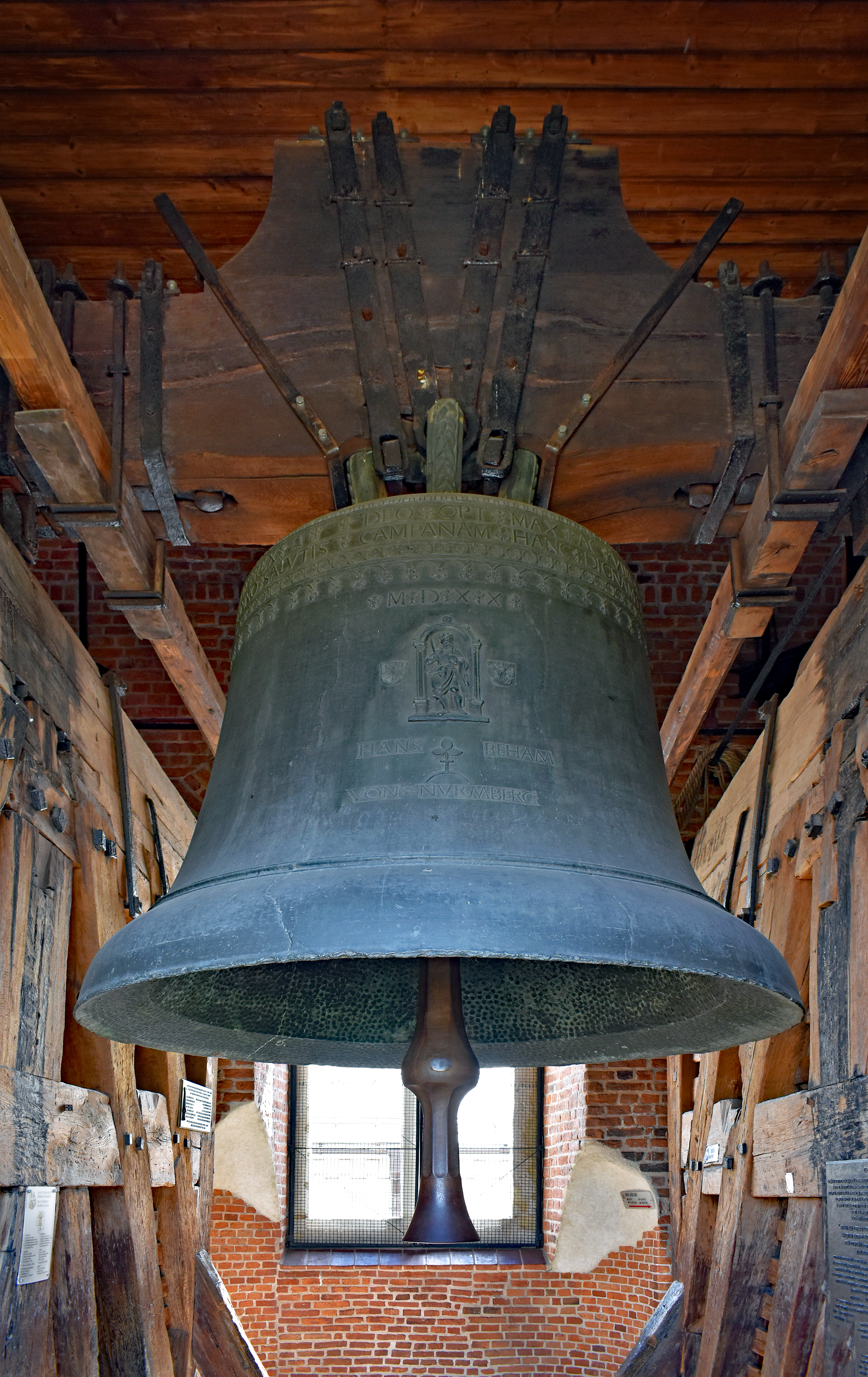
The Sigismund Bell

== Stradom ==
Stradom is the historic part of the city of Kraków, to 1954 quarter of the city.

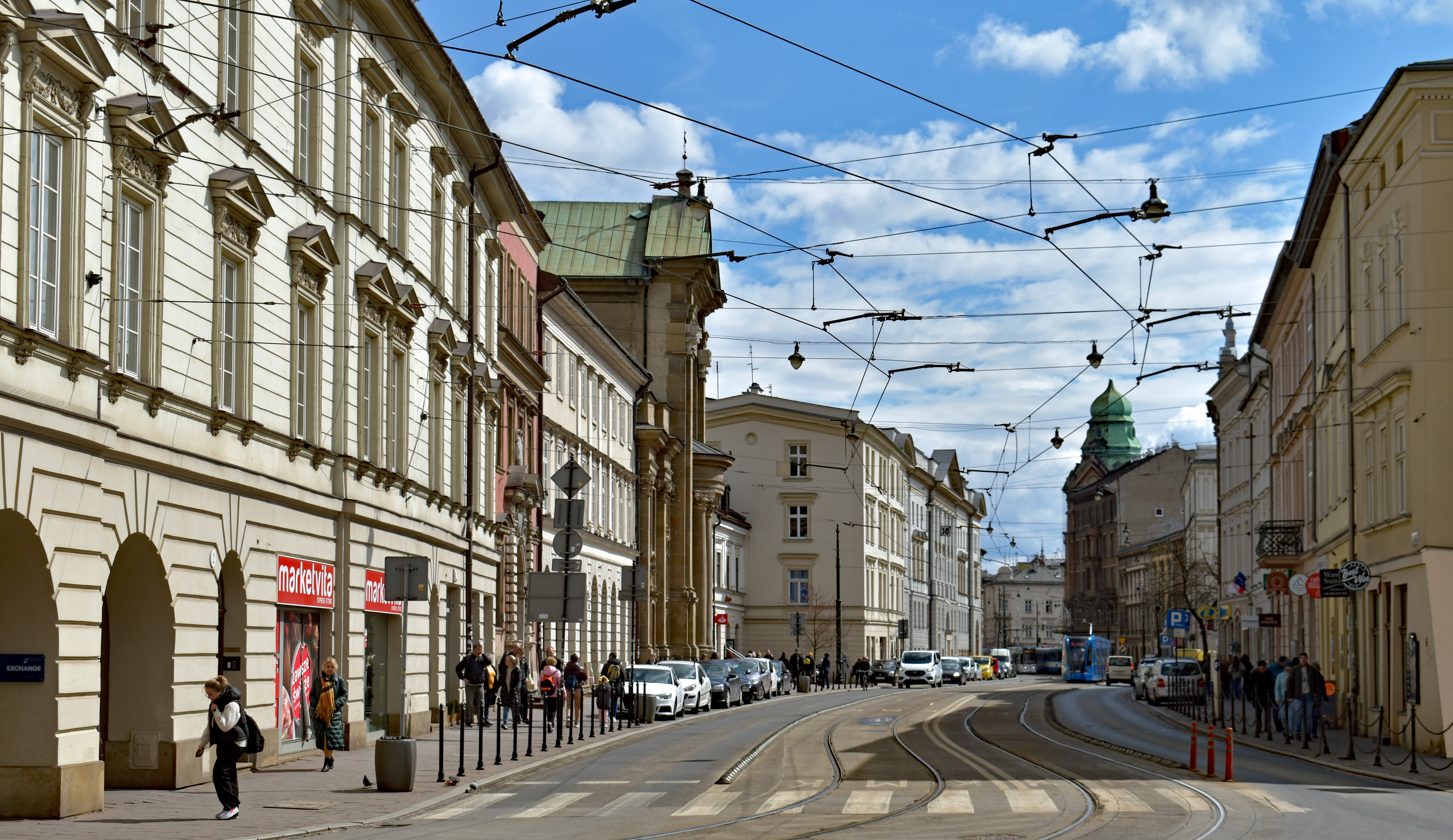
Stradomska Street

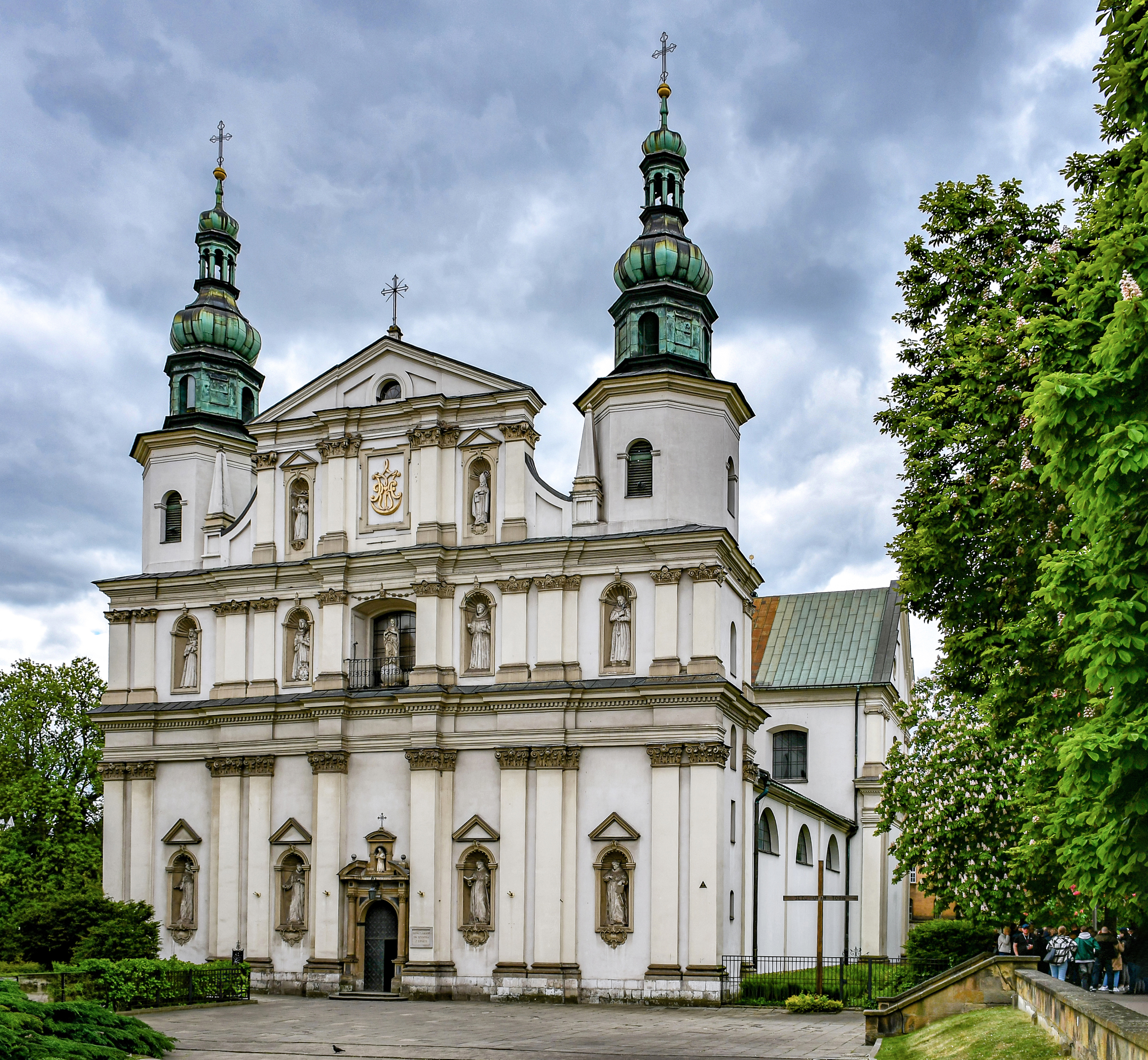
Church of St. Bernardino of Siena

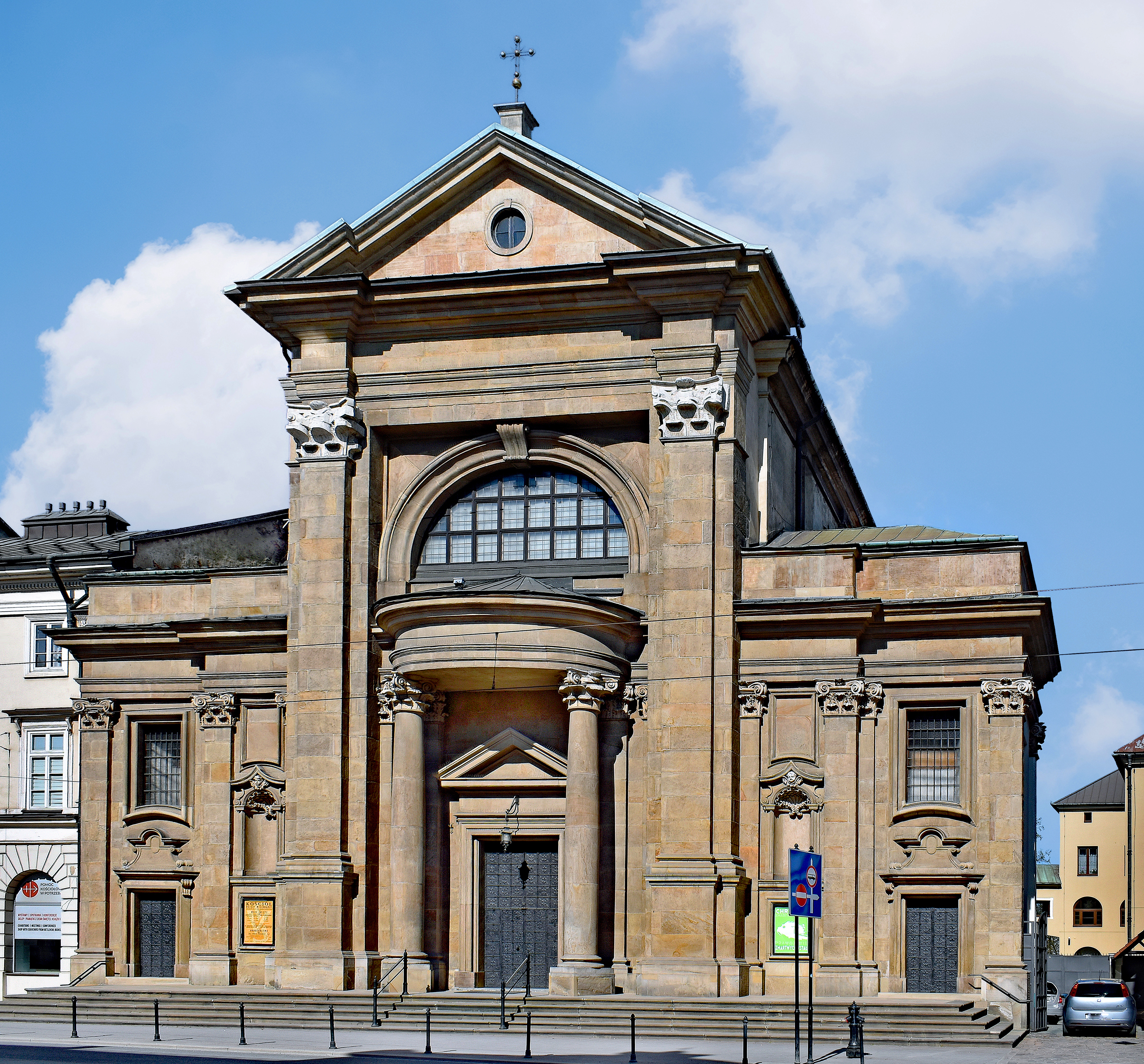
Church of the Conversion of St. Paul

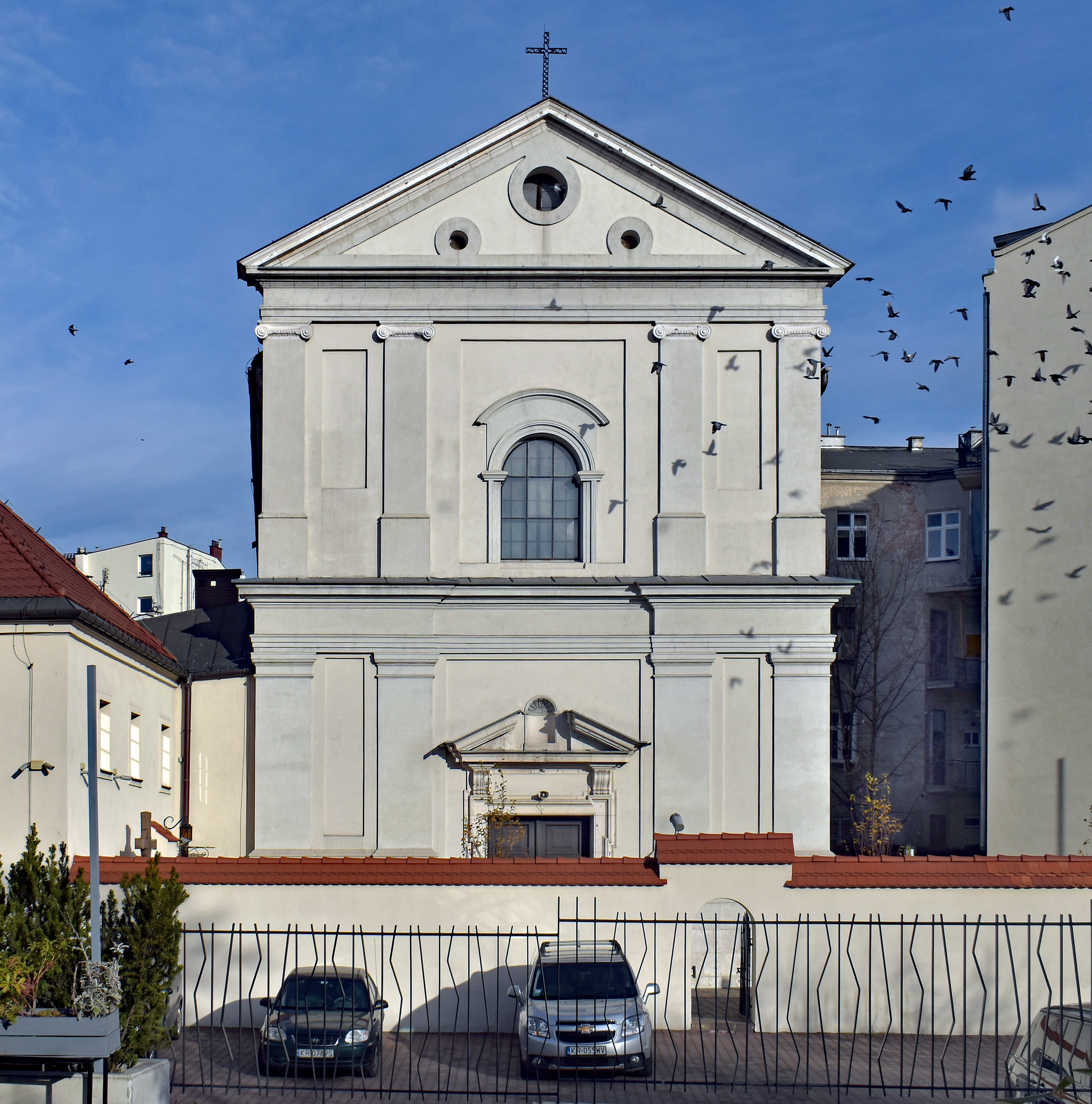
Church of St. Agnes of Rome

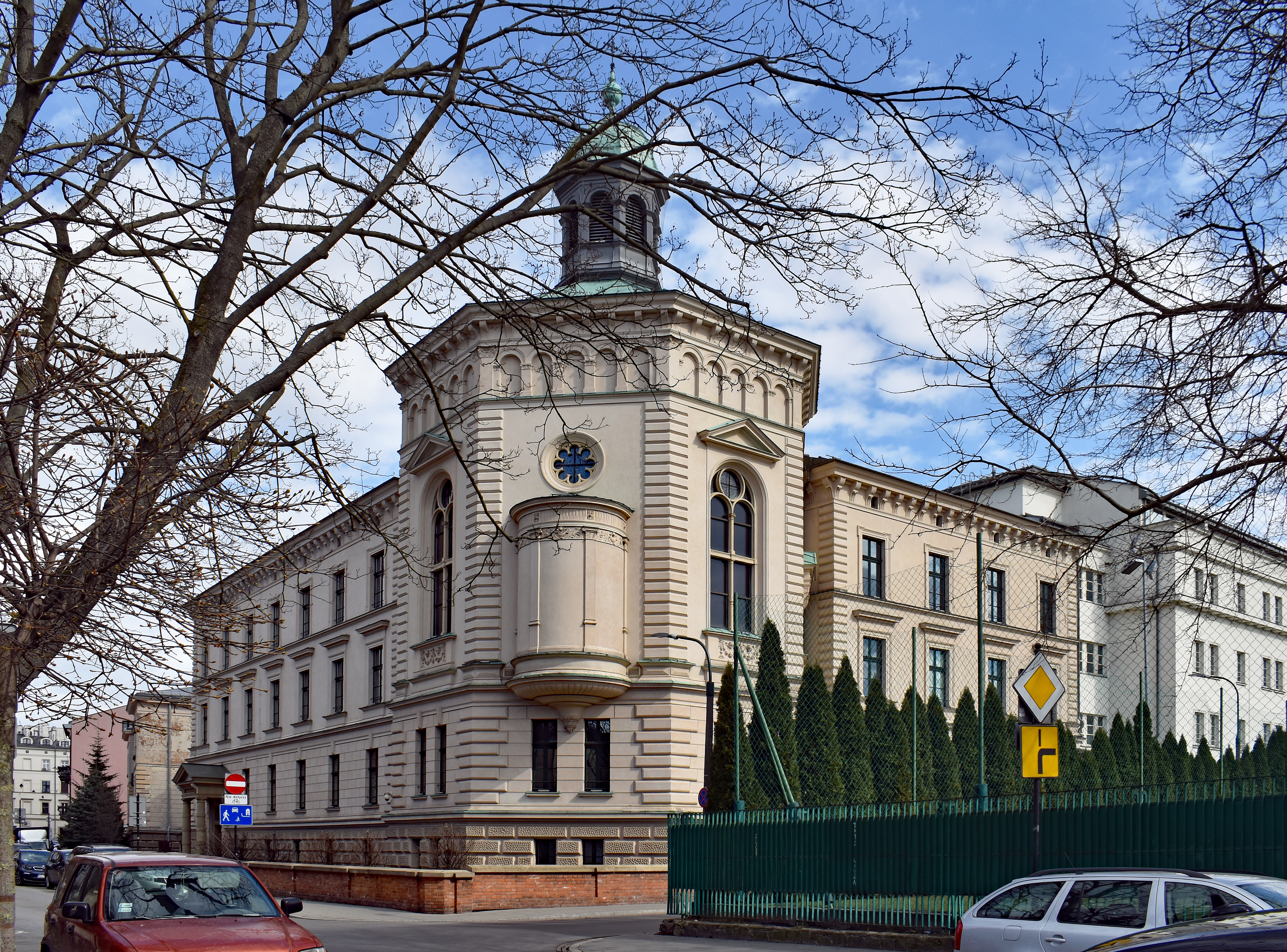
Former Colettine sisters convent and chapel

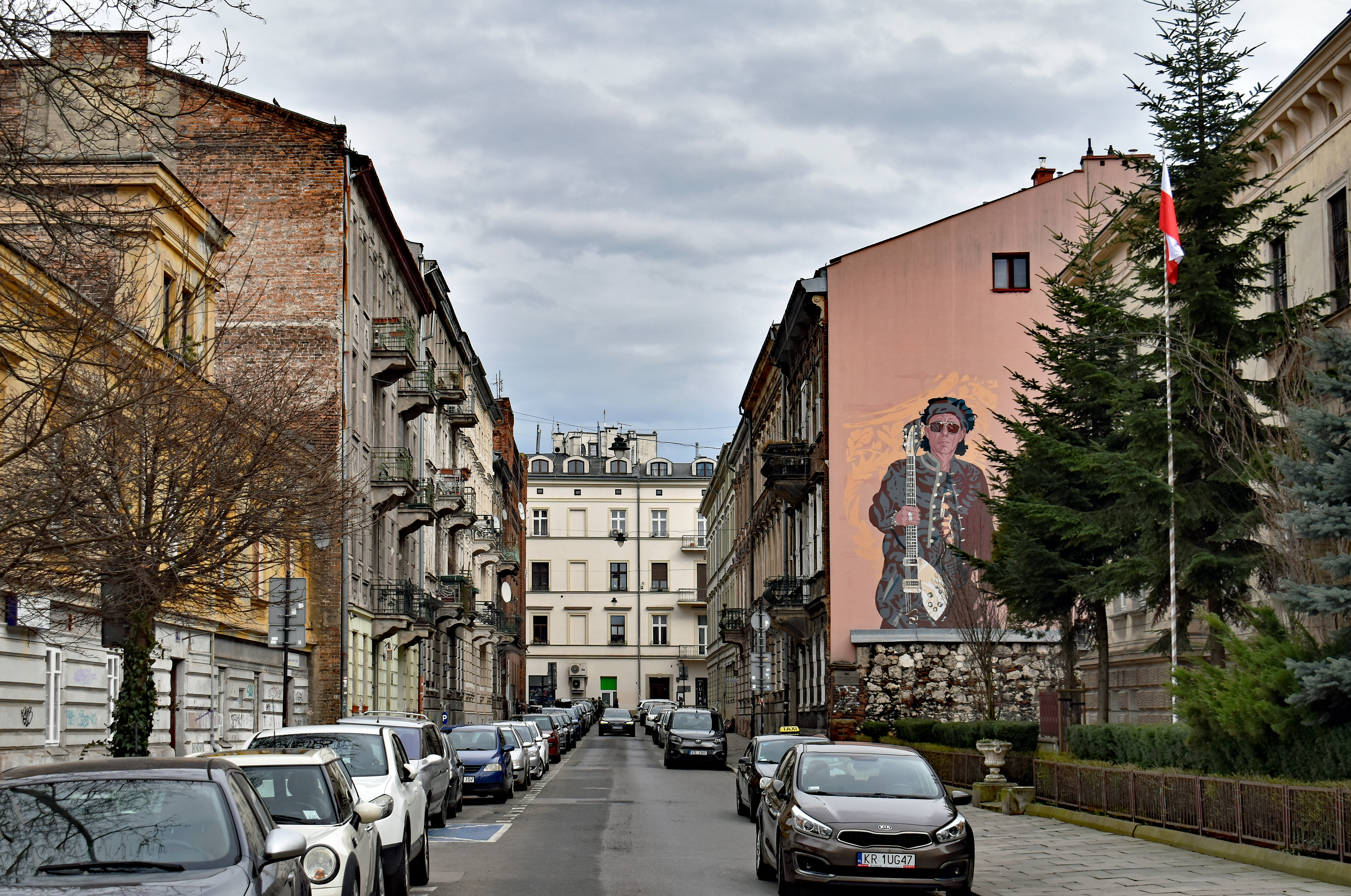
Koletek Street

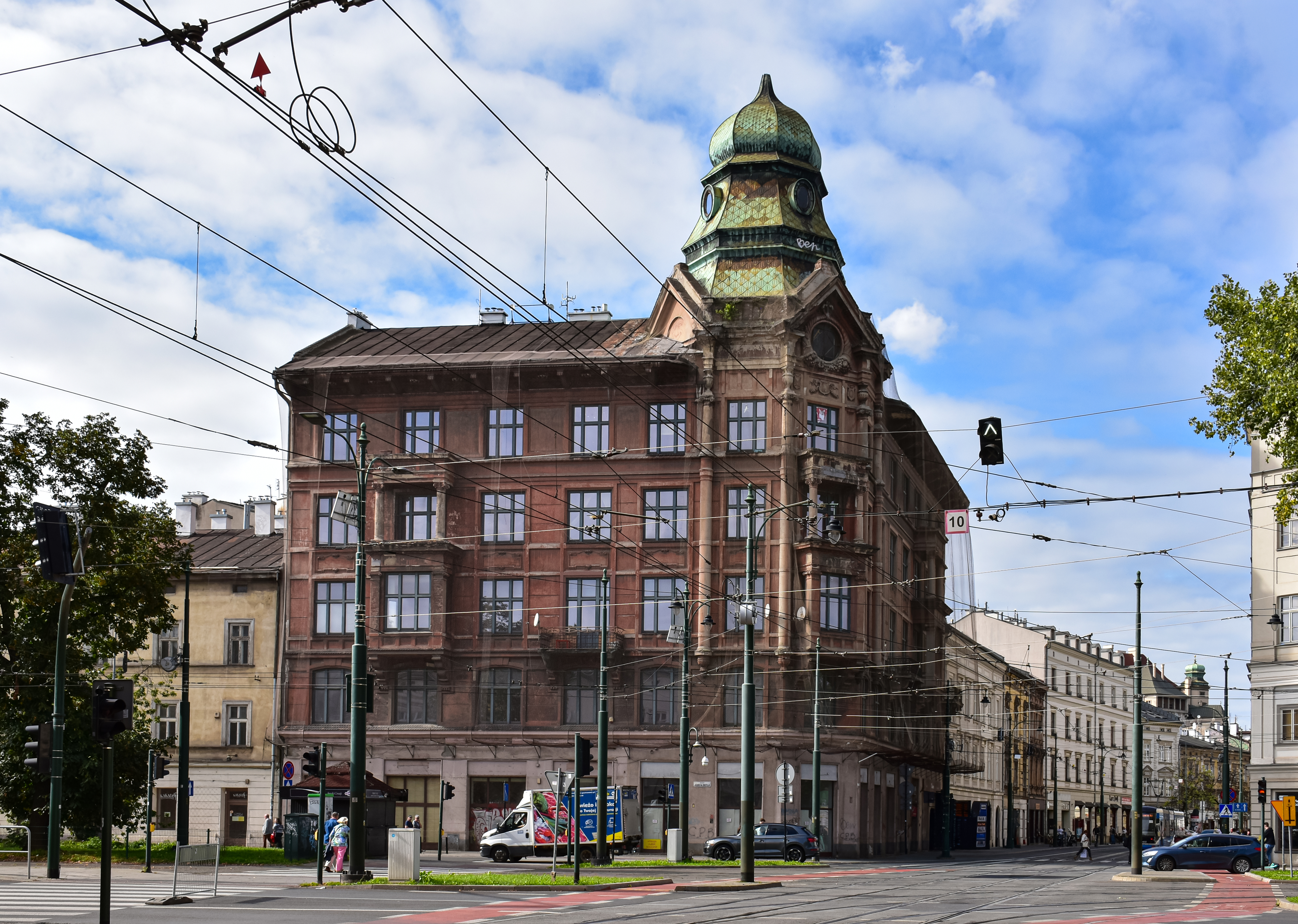
Ohrensteins Tenement House

== Kazimierz ==
Kazimierz is a former Jewish town and to 1954 quarter of Kraków, the historical center of Jewish religious and social life.

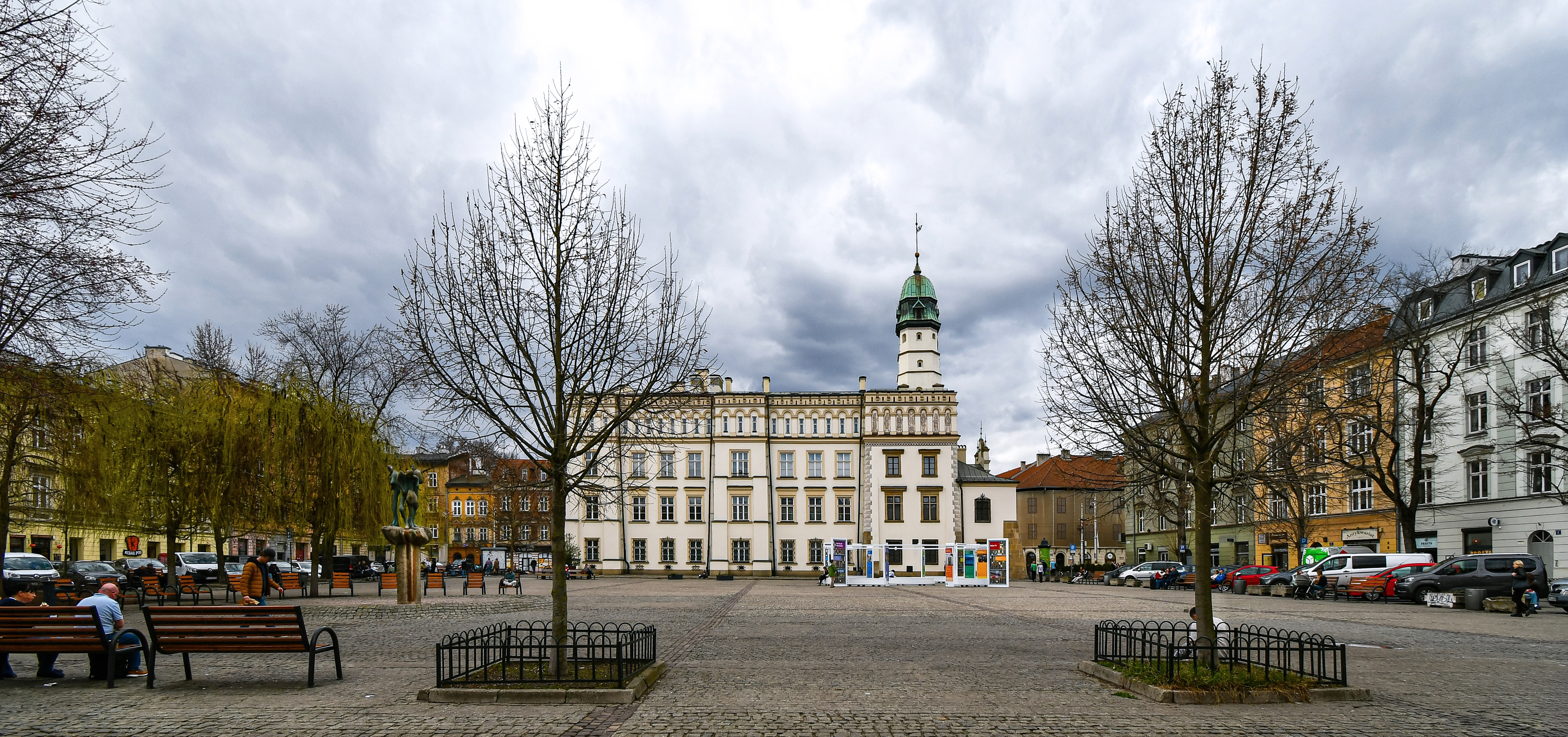
Wolnica Square and old town hall

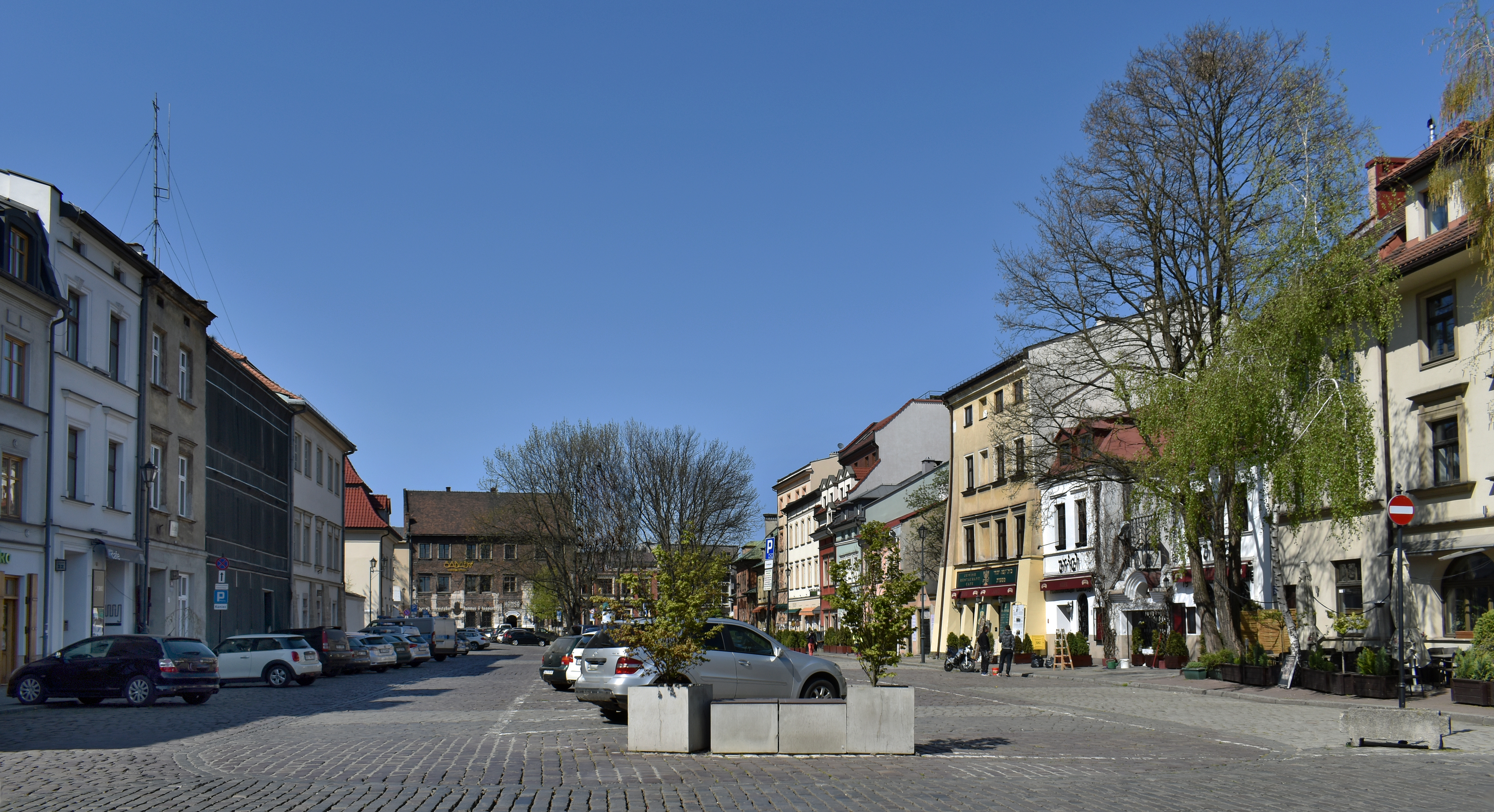
Szeroka Street

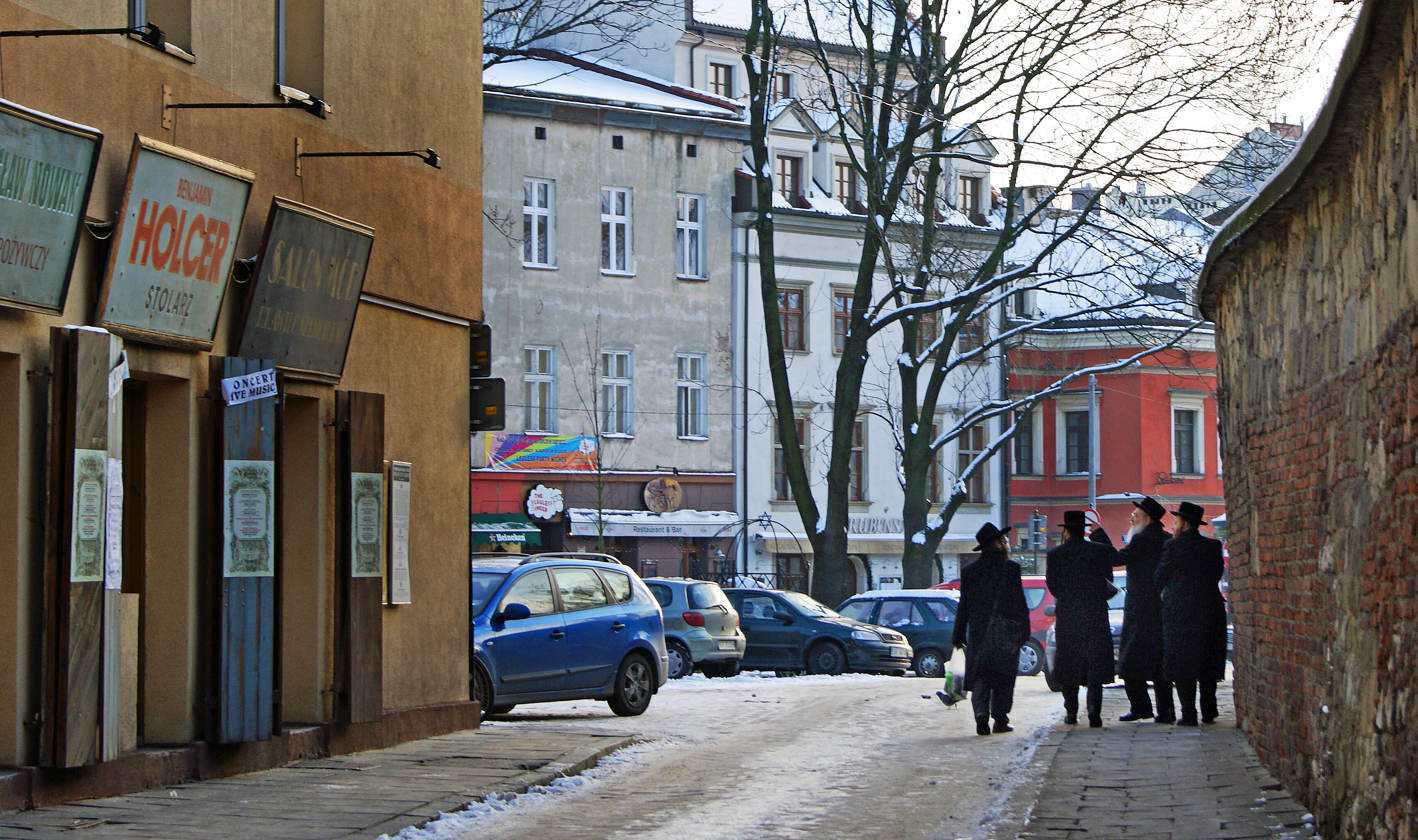
Szeroka Street

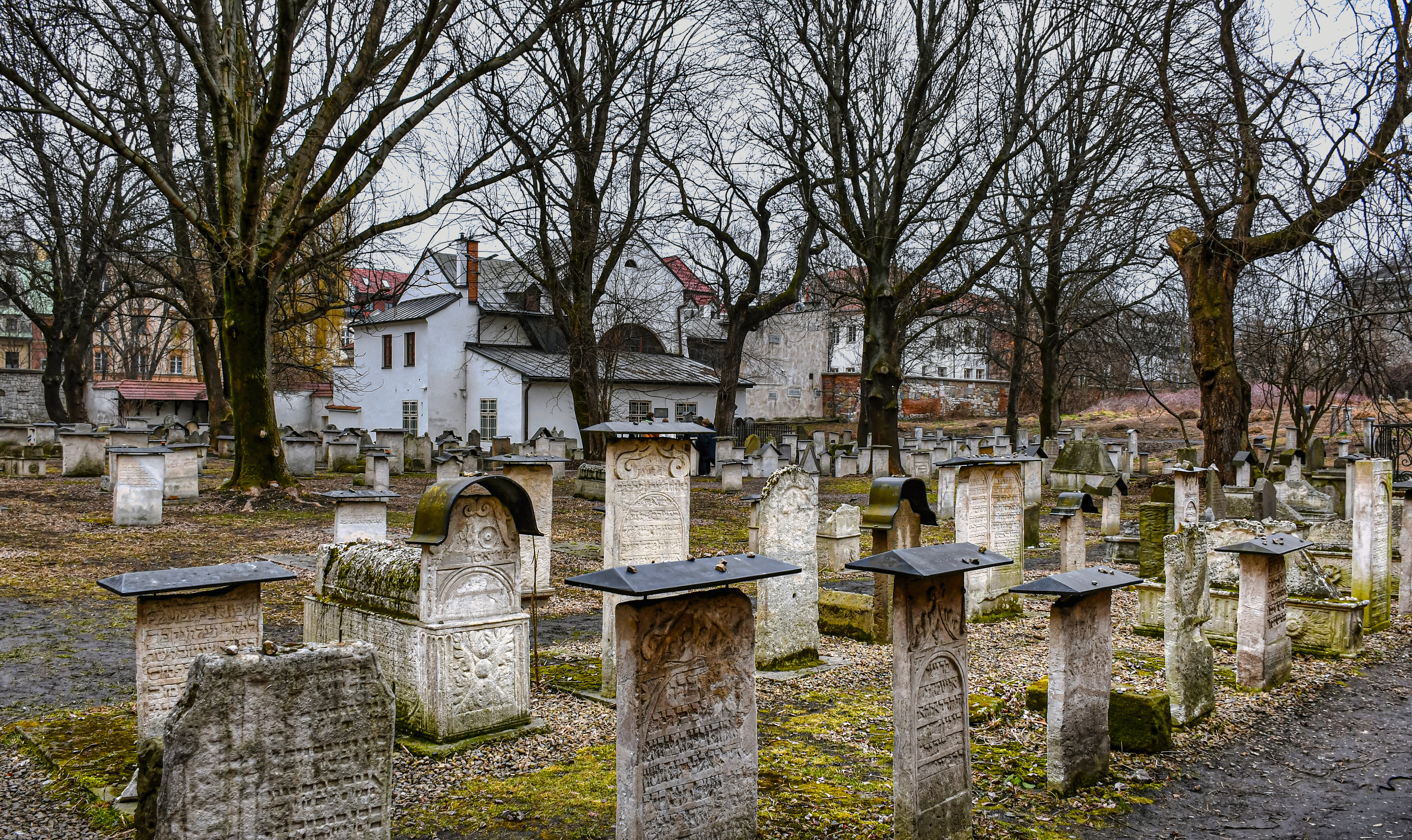
Remah Cemetery and Remah Synagogue

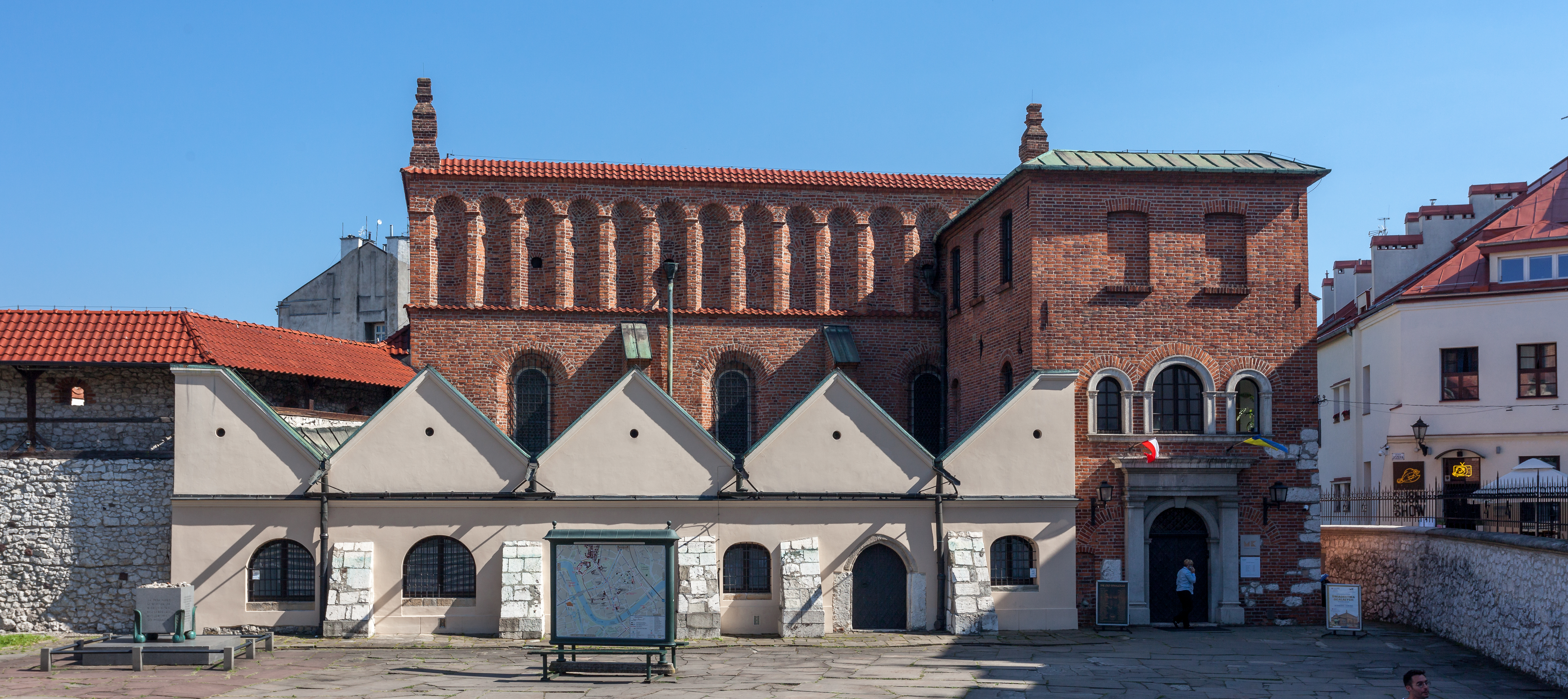
Old Synagogue

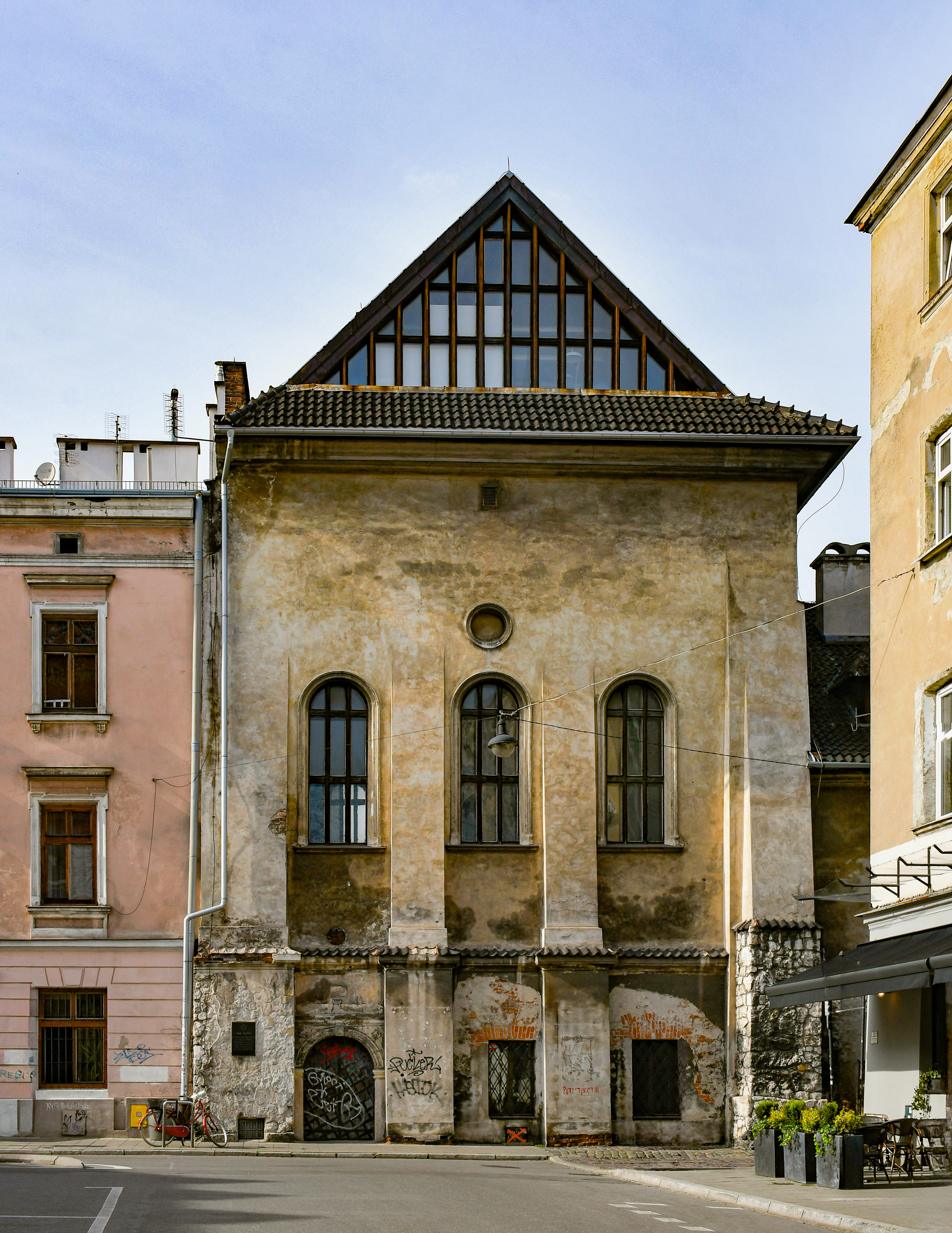
High Synagogue

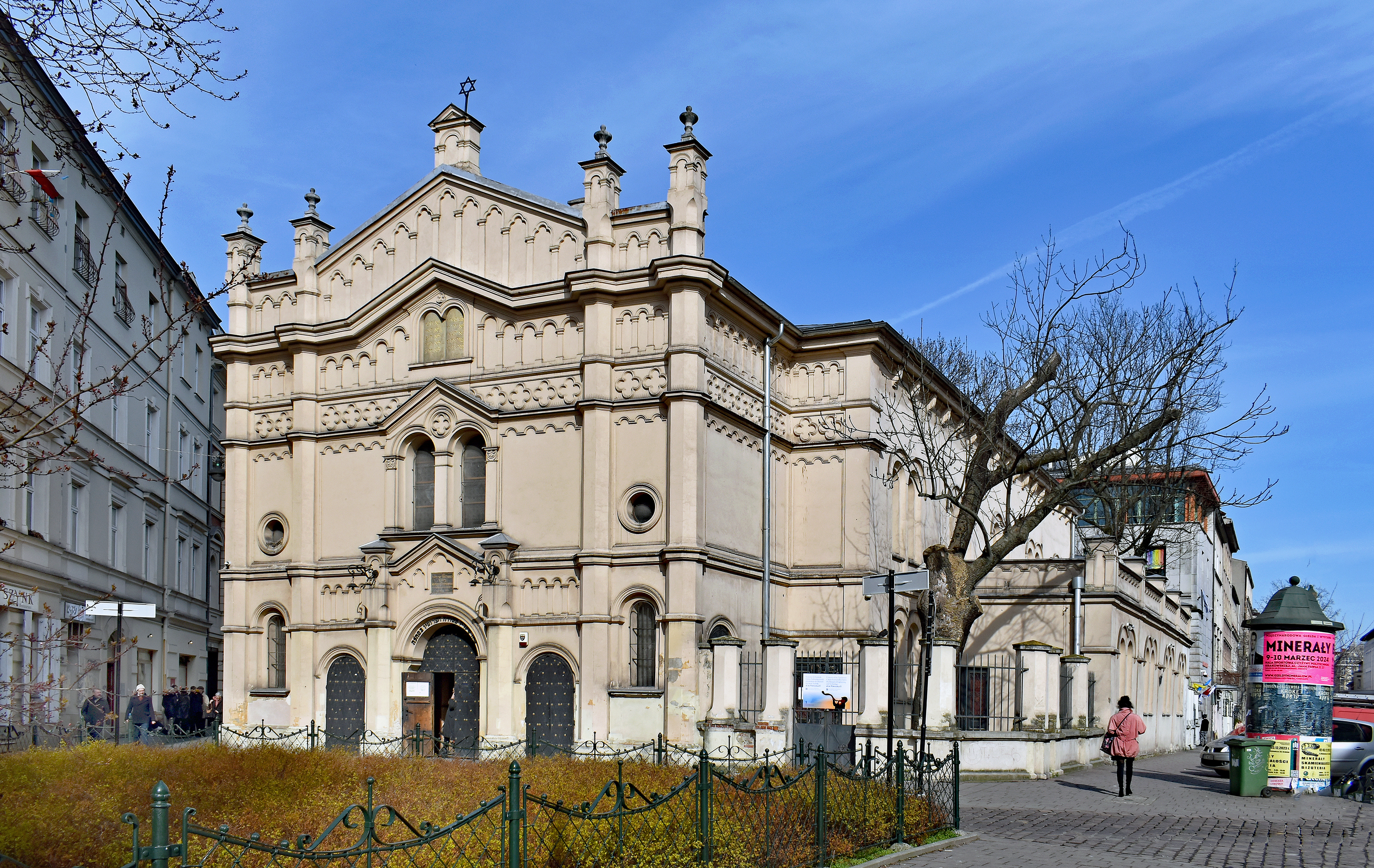
Tempel Synagogue

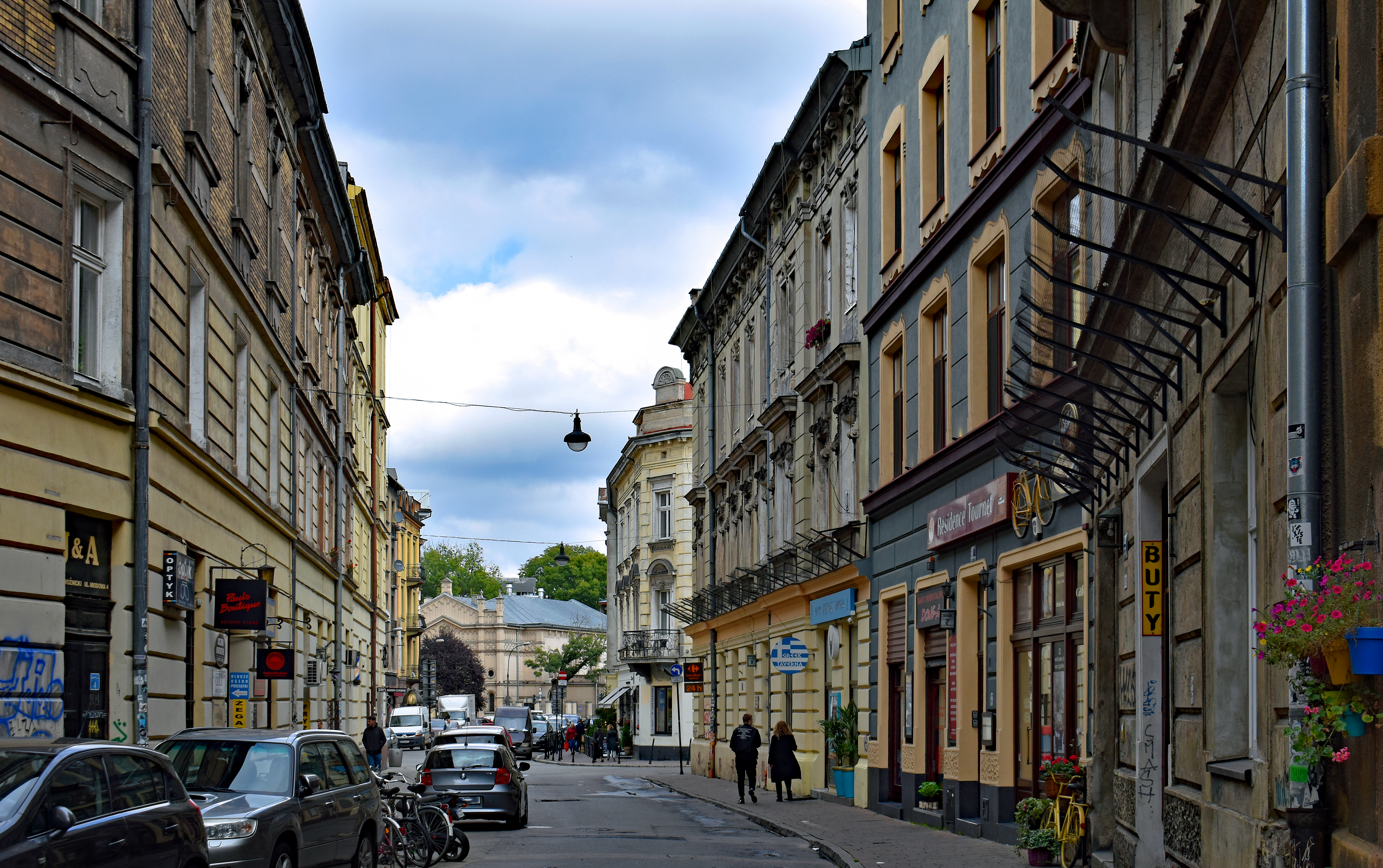
Miodowa Street, Kraków

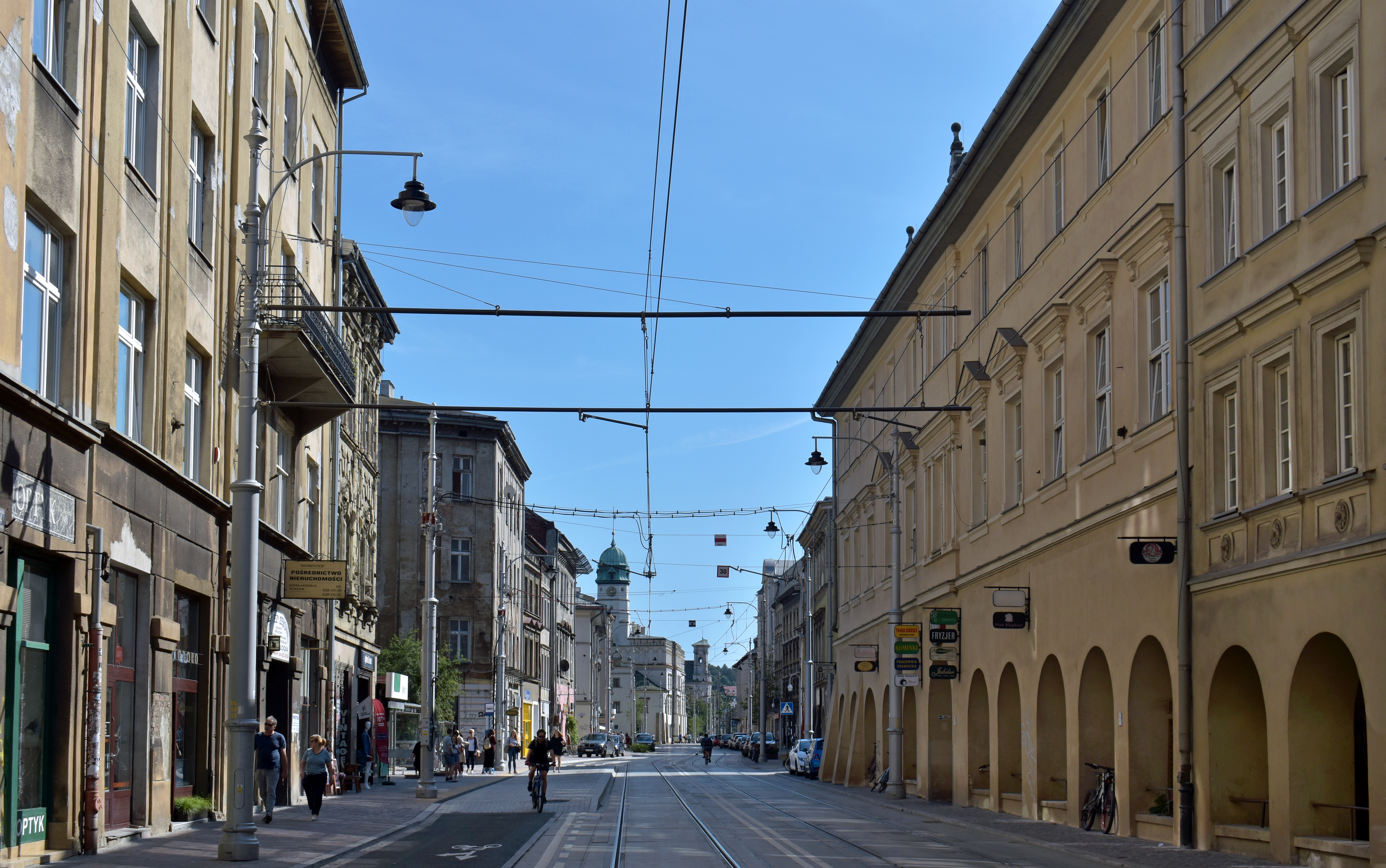
Krakowska Street

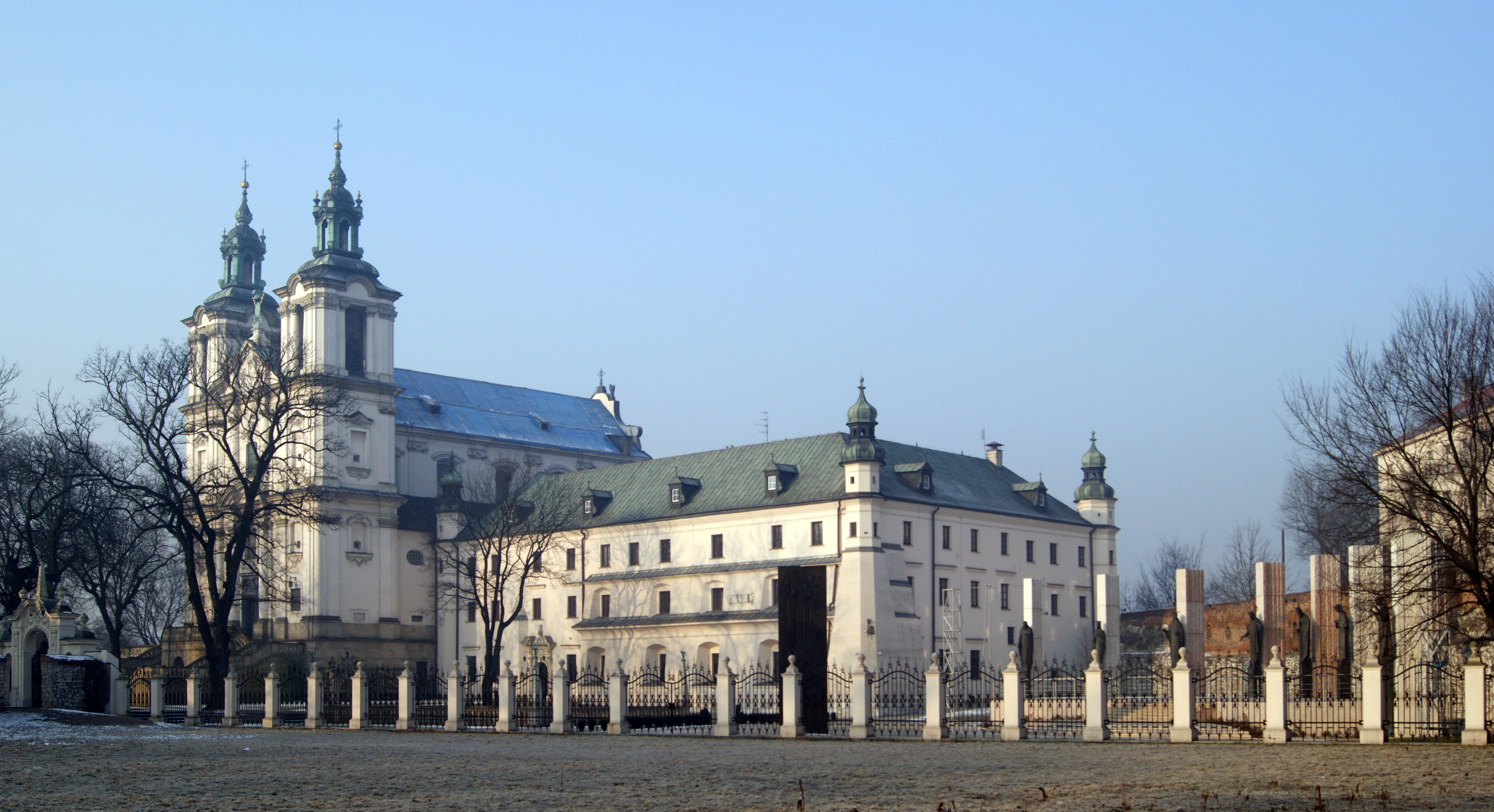
Church of St. Michael the Archangel and St. Stanislaus and Pauline Fathers convent (Skałka)
