= High Synagogue (Kraków) =

Former Orthodox synagogue, now museum, in Kraków, Poland

High Synagogue (High Prayerhouse)
- Synagoga Wysoka (Bóżnica Wysoka) הויכע שול
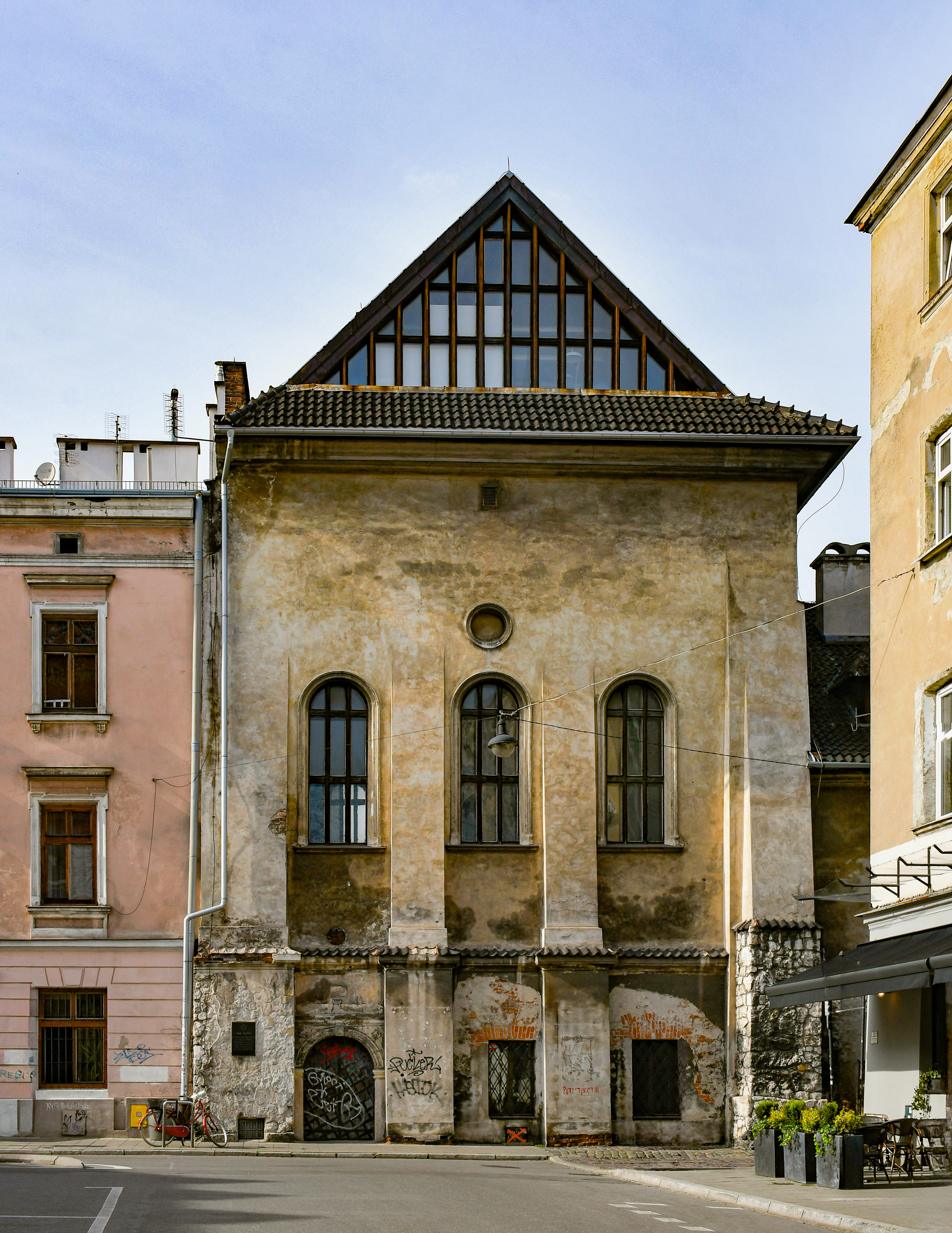
- Synagogue, front façade (2025)

Religion
- Affiliation: Orthodox Judaism (former)
- Rite: Nusach Ashkenaz
- Ecclesiastical or organisational status: Synagogue (1563–1939); Profane use (1945–1960s); Jewish museum (since 2005)
- Ownership: Austeria Publishing House (since 2008)
- Status: Inactive (as a synagogue); Repurposed

Location
- Location: 38 Józefa Street; Kraków, Kazimierz
- Country: Poland
- Interactive map of High Synagogue (High Prayerhouse)
- Coordinates: 50°03′05″N 19°56′50.6″E

Architecture
- Type: Synagogue architecture
- Style: Late Renaissance
- Groundbreaking: 1556
- Completed: 1563
- Destroyed: 1939 (interior only)
- Materials: Brick

UNESCO World Heritage Site
- Type: Cultural
- Criteria: iv
- Designated: 1978
- Part of: Historic Centre of Kraków
- Reference no.: 29
- Region: Europe and North America

Historic Monument of Poland
- Designated: 1994-09-08
- Part of: Kraków historical city complex
- Reference no.: M.P. 1994 nr 50 poz. 418

The High Synagogue (Polish: Synagoga Wysoka) was a former Orthodox Jewish congregation and synagogue, also known as the Tall Synagogue (corresponding to its height), located at Jozefa 38 Street, in the Kazimierz district of Kraków, in the Małopolskie Voivodeship of Poland.

Completed in 1563 in the late Renaissance style, the synagogue served as a house of prayer until World War II when its interior was destroyed by Nazis in 1939. Renovations of the synagogue occurred in 1863; and during 1970 and 1971. Since 2005, the former synagogue has operated as a Jewish museum.

== Early history ==
In the second half of the 16th century, a wealthy merchant known only as Israel submitted his request for building a Jewish house of worship to king Sigismund II Augustus. He obtained consent and in 1563 he commenced construction (some sources suggest the years 1556-1563). According to one hypothesis, the synagogue was built by Sephardic Jews, perhaps from Greece or Italy. It was the third synagogue to be erected in Kazimierz. The prayer rooms were located on the second floor above the ground floor shops. The interior walls of the sanctuary featured paintings of scenes in Jerusalem, including the "Tomb of the Israelite Kings," "Western Wall," and a handsome pair of lions in the women's gallery.

== World War II ==
During the occupation of Poland in World War II, Nazis stripped the interior of all furnishings. However the seventeenth-century baroque chanukah candlestick, which was transported to Wawel castle, is the only element of the equipment of the synagogue that survived the war. Currently, it is on permanent exhibition in the Old Synagogue at ulica Szeroka 24.

The ceiling and roof were altered after the war, adding another storey above the synagogue. At present only the stone niche for the Aron Kodesh and the wall-paintings uncovered early in the 21st century by art conservation remain. On the eastern wall there is the largest and at the same time the oldest Renaissance Aron HaKodesh in Poland, the framework probably coming from the end of the sixteenth century, and the capstone from the late eighteenth century. Above the rectangular frame is a grotesque ornament in the form of two griffins, which formerly held the crown and the Hebrew inscription of Keter Torah, which means the crown of the Torah. The cavity is bordered by channeled pillars with composite capitals. During the conservation works, in 1971-1972, painted heavy curtains were discovered on the sides of the pillars, which disappeared over time.

The High Synagogue serves as a Landmark Conservation building. Since 2005 it has been open to visitors. Photographic and other exhibitions about customs and traditions of the Jewish community of the interwar period are staged indoors.

The High Synagogue of Prague was modelled after the Krakow's High Synagogue.

== Gallery ==
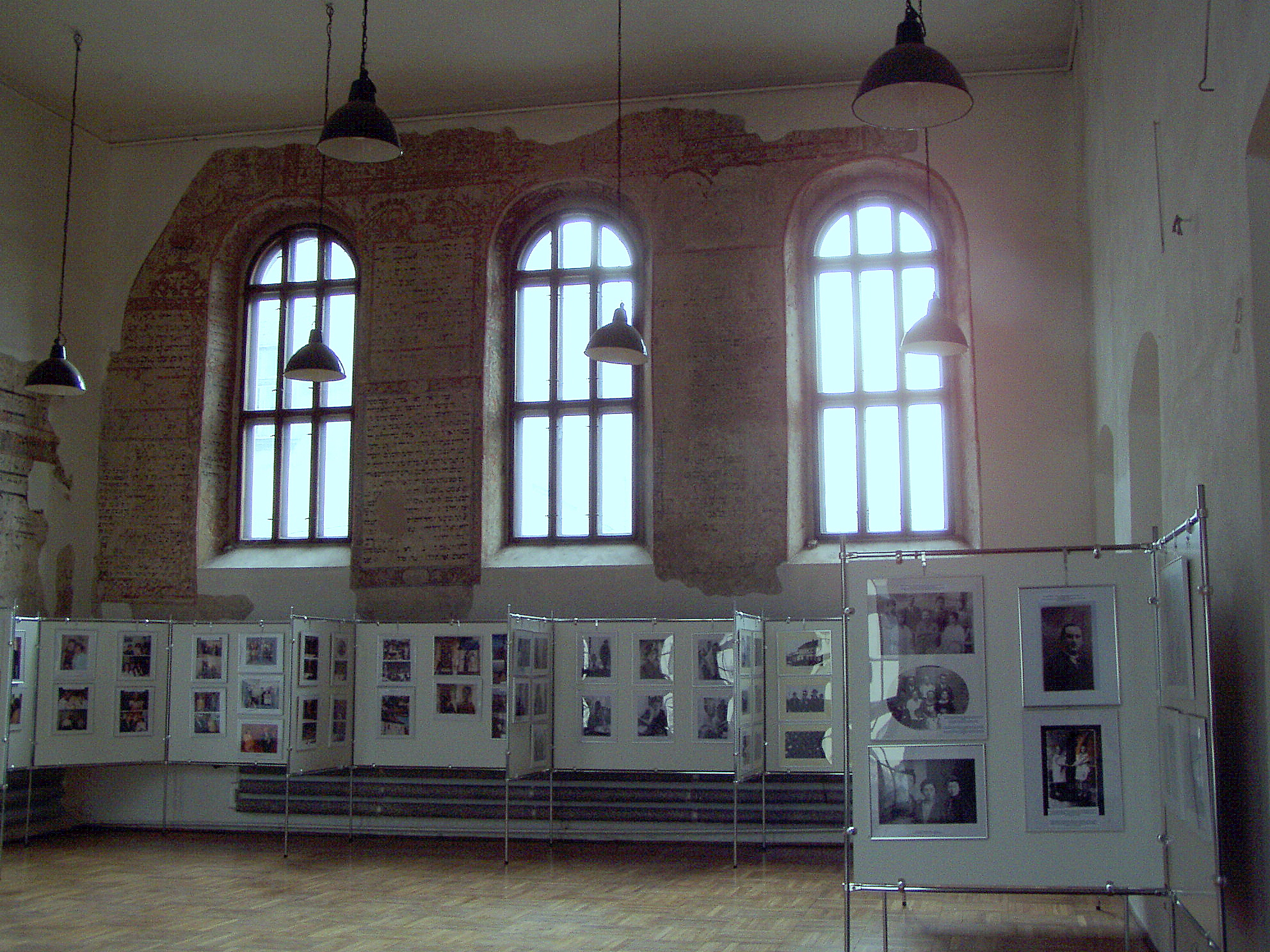
Interior, historical exhibit

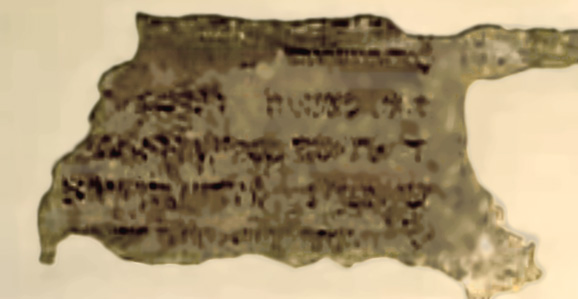
Ancient scripture under stucco after conservation

== See also ==
- History of the Jews in Poland
- List of active synagogues in Poland
- Oldest synagogues in the world
- Synagogues of Kraków
