= Tempel Synagogue =

Tempel Synagogue may refer to:

- Tempel Synagogue (Kraków)
- Tempel Synagogue (Lviv)
- Tempel Synagogue (Przemyśl)
- Tempel Synagogue (Żywiec)
