= Tempel Synagogue (Żywiec) =

Destroyed synagogue in Żywiec, Poland

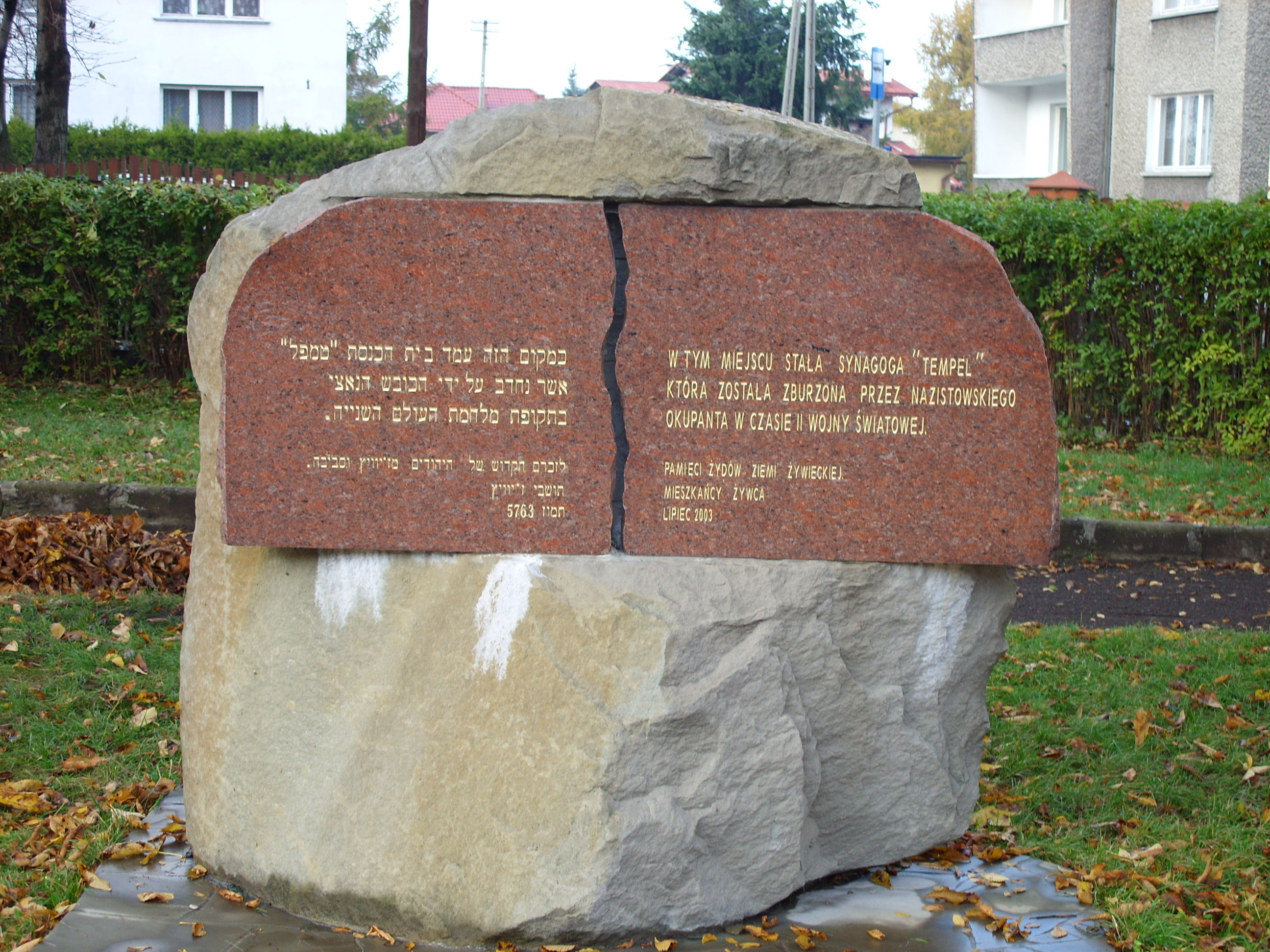
- Monument to the synagogue

- Location of the destroyed synagogue in Silesian Voivodeship

Religion
- Affiliation: Reform Judaism
- Ecclesiastical or organizational status: Synagogue
- Status: Destroyed

Location
- Location: Zabłocie (now Żywiec)
- Country: Poland
- Interactive map of Tempel Synagogue
- Coordinates: 49°41′06″N 19°11′24″E

Architecture
- Type: Synagogue architecture
- Completed: mid-1800s
- Destroyed: 1942
- Materials: Brick

The Tempel Synagogue (Polish: Synagoga Tempel) was a Reform Jewish congregation and synagogue located between the streets Dworcowa and Wesoła in Zabłocie, now a district of Żywiec, Poland. Constructed in the 19th century, the synagogue served as a house of prayer until World War II, when it was destroyed by the Nazis.

== History ==
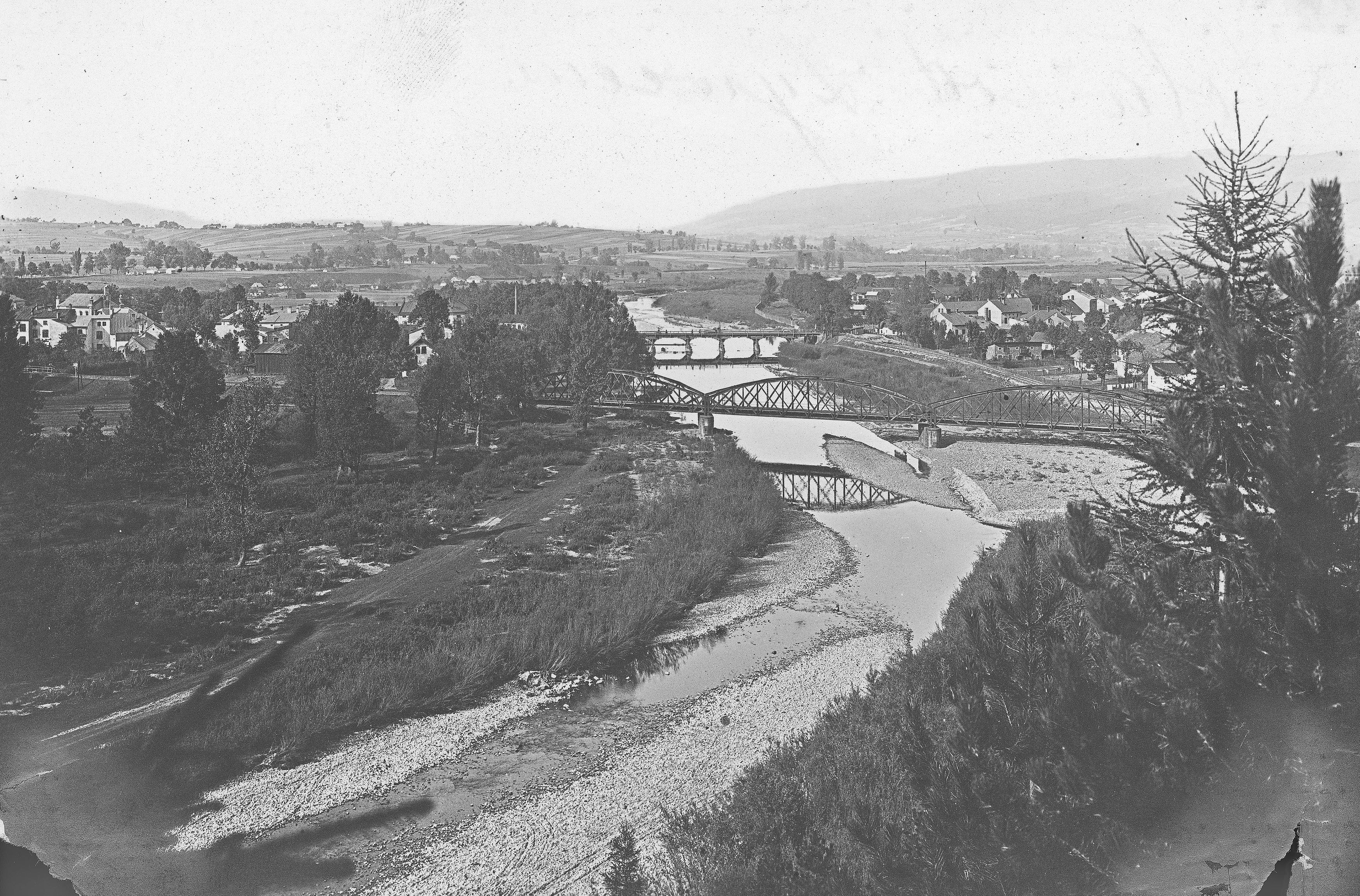
Panoramic view of Żywiec and Zabłocie, with the synagogue visible on the left

Local Jews formed a religious association in 1864. The synagogue in Zabłocie was constructed in the mid-1800s. It was architecturally similar to the Tempel Synagogue in Kraków. A Jewish school and a house of culture were built alongside it. Surrounded by trees, it was the tallest building in the area.

German Nazis destroyed the synagogue complex between 1940 and 1943, during the occupation of Poland. The synagogue building was blown up in 1942. Most of the local Jewish residents died in the Auschwitz concentration camp. The Nazis set up a labor camp near the former synagogue.

Following the Second World War, a vocational school was constructed where the synagogue had stood. On 7 July 2003, the synagogue was commemorated with a monument by Mirosław Ciślak, with inscriptions in Polish and Hebrew.

== See also ==
- History of the Jews in Poland
- List of active synagogues in Poland

== Bibliography ==
- Klistała, Jerzy (2009). MARTYROLOGIUM mieszkańców Żywca, Czernichowa, Gilowic, Jelesńi, Koszarawy, Lipowej, Łękawicy, Łodygowic, Milówki, Radziechowych, Rajczy, Stryszawy, Suchej, Węgierskiej Górki i innych w latach 1939-1945: słownik biograficzny (PDF). Żywiec: Towarzystwo Milosników Ziemi Źywieckiej. ISBN 978-83-60878-09-5.
