= Stolp Synagogue =

Former synagogue in Słupsk, Poland

- Polish: Synagoga Słupsk
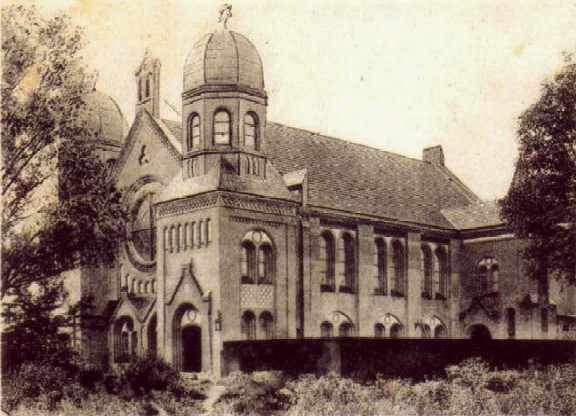
- The former synagogue, now destroyed, undated

- Location of the destroyed synagogue in Pomeranian Voivodeship, Poland

Religion
- Affiliation: Judaism (former)
- Ecclesiastical or organizational status: Synagogue (1902–1938)
- Status: Destroyed

Location
- Location: Słupsk, Pomeranian Voivodeship (formerly Stolp)
- Country: Poland (formerly Germany)
- Interactive map of Stolp Synagogue
- Coordinates: 54°28′05″N 17°01′33″E

Architecture
- Architect: Eduard Koch
- Type: Synagogue architecture
- Groundbreaking: 1901
- Completed: 1902
- Destroyed: 10 November 1938 (during Kristallnacht)

The Stolp Synagogue (Polish: Synagoga Słupsk) was a former Jewish congregation and synagogue, now destroyed, that was located in Stolp, Germany, that is now Słupsk, in the Pomeranian Voivodeship of Poland.

Designed by Eduard Koch, the synagogue was completed in 1902 and destroyed by Nazis during Kristallnacht, on November 10, 1938.

An unveiling ceremony for a monument commemorating the Jewish community of the city, was held in 2006, organized by the Foundation for the Preservation of Jewish Heritage in Poland.

== See also ==
- History of the Jews in Germany
- History of the Jews in Poland
- List of synagogues in Germany (in German)
- List of active synagogues in Poland
