= 15 Miodowa Street tenement =

15 Miodowa
- Kamienica przy ulicy Miodowej 15
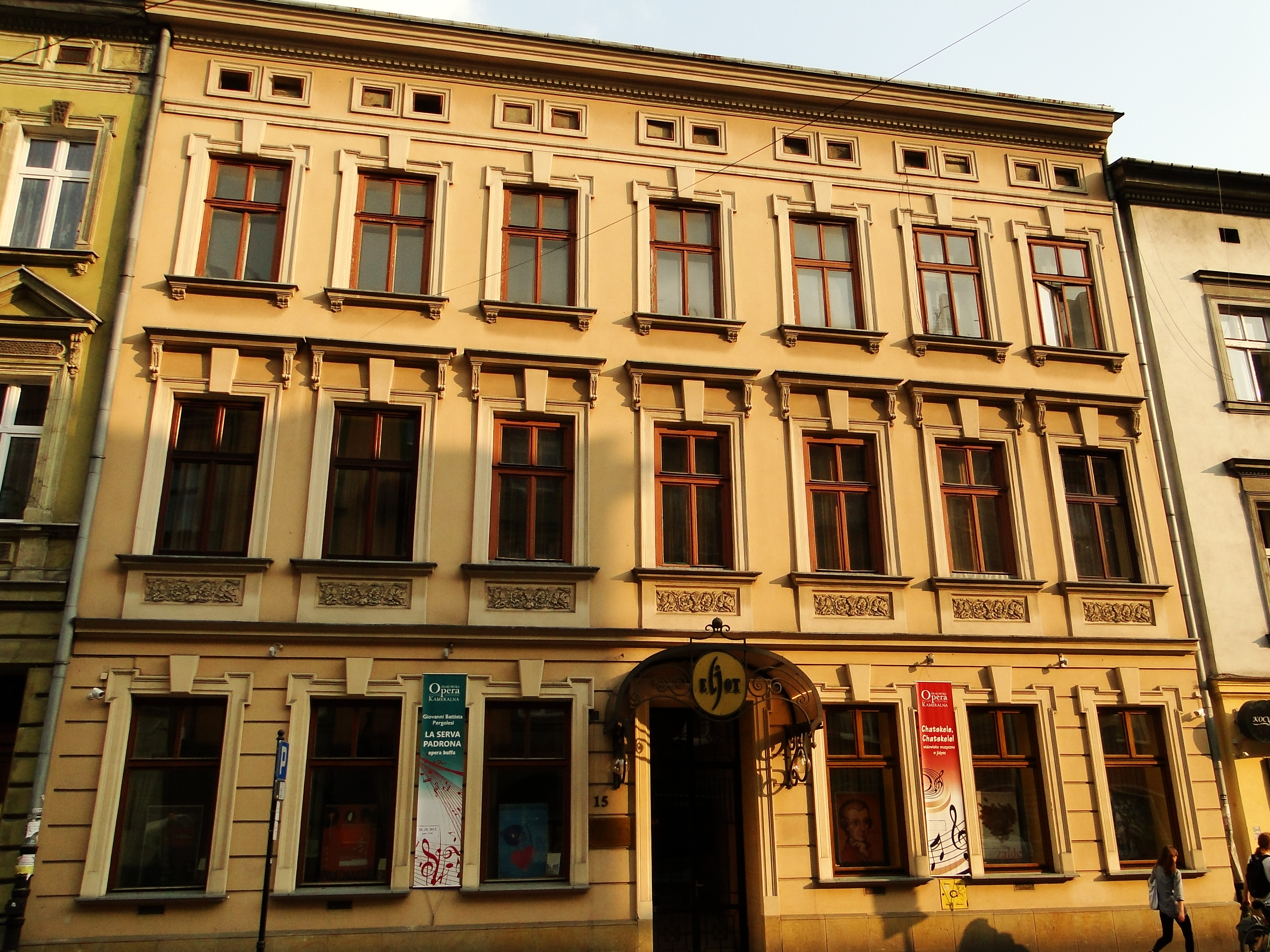

General information
- Address: 15 Miodowa Street
- Town or city: Kraków
- Country: Poland
- Coordinates: 50°03′08″N 19°56′37″E
- Completed: 1896

15 Miodowa (Polish: Kamienica przy ulicy Miodowej 15) is a tenement house located in Kraków, in district Old Town at 15 Miodowa Street, in the Kazimierz neighborhood.

The tenement house was built in 1896 according to the design of architect Beniamin Torbe.

On May 26, 1997, the tenement was entered into the Registry of Cultural Property. It is also entered into the municipal register of monuments of the Lesser Poland Voivodeship.
