= Miodowa Street, Kraków =

Street in Kraków, Poland

Miodowa Street
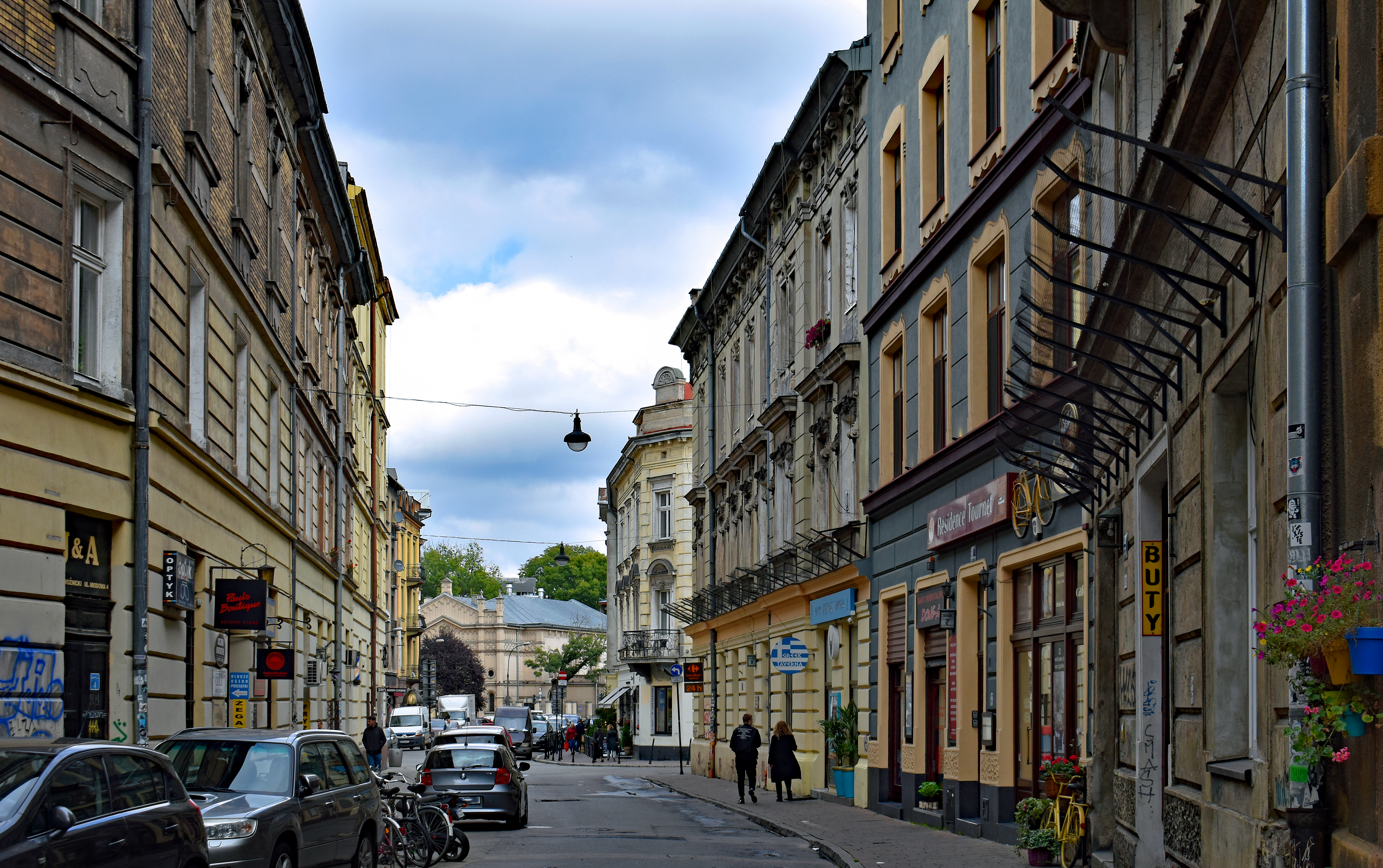
- View from Krakowska Street
- Interactive map of Miodowa Street
- Part of: Old Town district
- Owner: City of Kraków
- Location: Kraków; Poland

UNESCO World Heritage Site
- Type: Cultural
- Criteria: iv
- Designated: 1978
- Part of: Historic Centre of Kraków
- Reference no.: 29
- Region: Europe and North America

Historic Monument of Poland
- Designated: 1994-09-08
- Part of: Kraków historical city complex
- Reference no.: M.P. 1994 nr 50 poz. 418

Miodowa Street (Polish: Ulica Miodowa, lit. Honey Street) - a historic street in Kazimierz and Grzegórzki (eastern part behind the railway viaduct), the former districts of Kraków, Poland.

== History ==
Between the city walls of Kazimierz and the Old Vistula River (current Józefa Dietla Street), a suburban road ran along the walls in the Middle Ages. After the demolition of Kazimierz’s city walls in the early 19th century, a street called Podbrzeże or Podbrzezie emerged, named after the suburb between the river and the walls. It was laid out around 1865 based on regulatory plans from 1828 and 1844.

The current name was given in 1858.

Before 1889, the street was extended beyond Starowiślna Street. In its eastern section, the street passes through a road underpass beneath railway line No. 91.

== Architecture ==
The buildings consist mainly of late 19th- and early 20th-century tenement houses, synagogues, and schools:

- 3 Miodowa Street – Tenement house, designed by Karol Knaus (1901).
- 6 Miodowa Street – Tenement house, designed by Karol Knaus (1899).
- 9 Miodowa Street – Tenement house, designed by Władysław Kleinberger (1898).
- 10 Miodowa Street (corner of 4 Bożego Ciała Street) – Tenement house, designed by August Pluszczyński (1835). Currently (2024), after renovation, it has been extended by two floors.
- 13 Miodowa Street – Tenement house, designed by Leopold Tlachna (1937). It housed a synagogue of Hasidic Jews from Cieszanów.
- 15 Miodowa Street – Tenement house, designed by Beniamin Torbe (1896).
- 19 Miodowa Street – Tenement house, designed by Aleksander Biborski (1905). The only Art Nouveau tenement in Kazimierz.
- 24 Miodowa Street – Tempel Synagogue.
- 24 Miodowa Street – Jewish Community Center.
- 24a Miodowa Street – Tenement house, designed by Zygmunt Prokesz (1929). It housed the Cheder Iwri Jewish elementary school and the Tachkemoni high school.
- 27 Miodowa Street (corner of 8 Warszauera Street) – Kupa Synagogue.
- 29 Miodowa Street – Tenement house, designed by Adam Dębski (1898).
- 36–36a Miodowa Street – Former Municipal School of Fr. Piramowicz, designed by Stefan Żołdani (1884). Now Primary School No. 11.
- 55 Miodowa Street – Funeral home, designed by Władysław Kleinberger (1903).
- 55 Miodowa Street – New Jewish Cemetery, established in 1800.
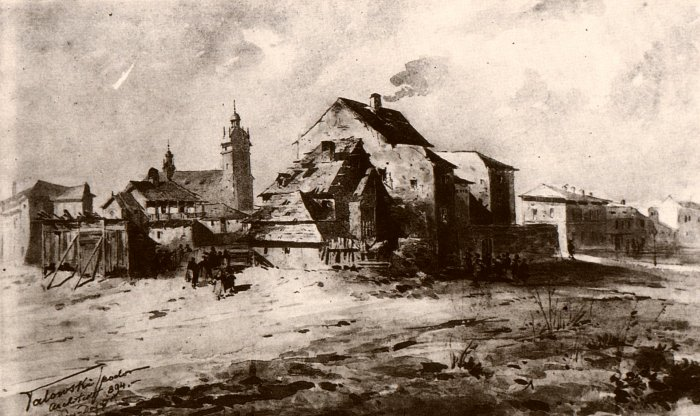
Miodowa Street
Watercolor by Teodor Talowski, 1895

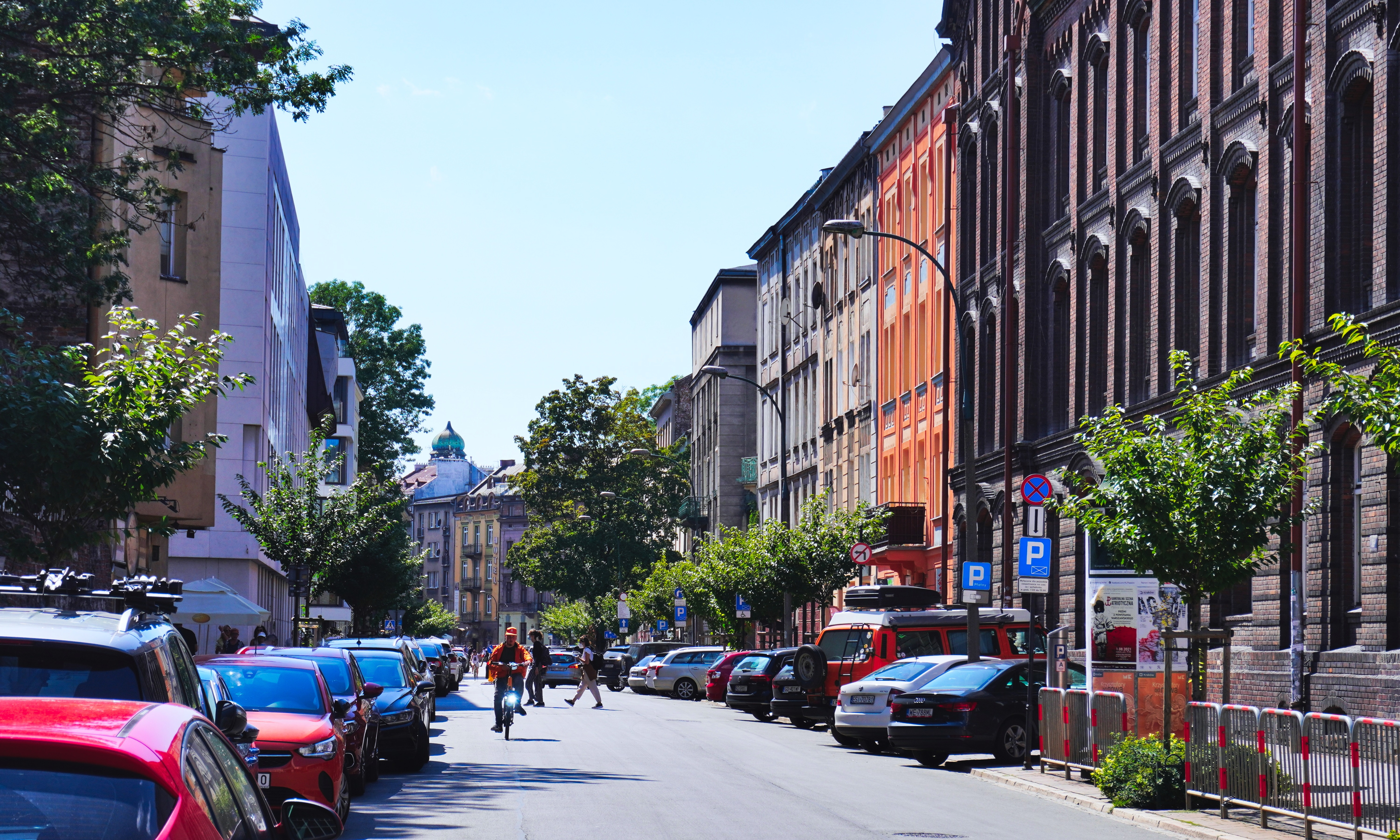
View from the intersection with Starowiślna Street to the west

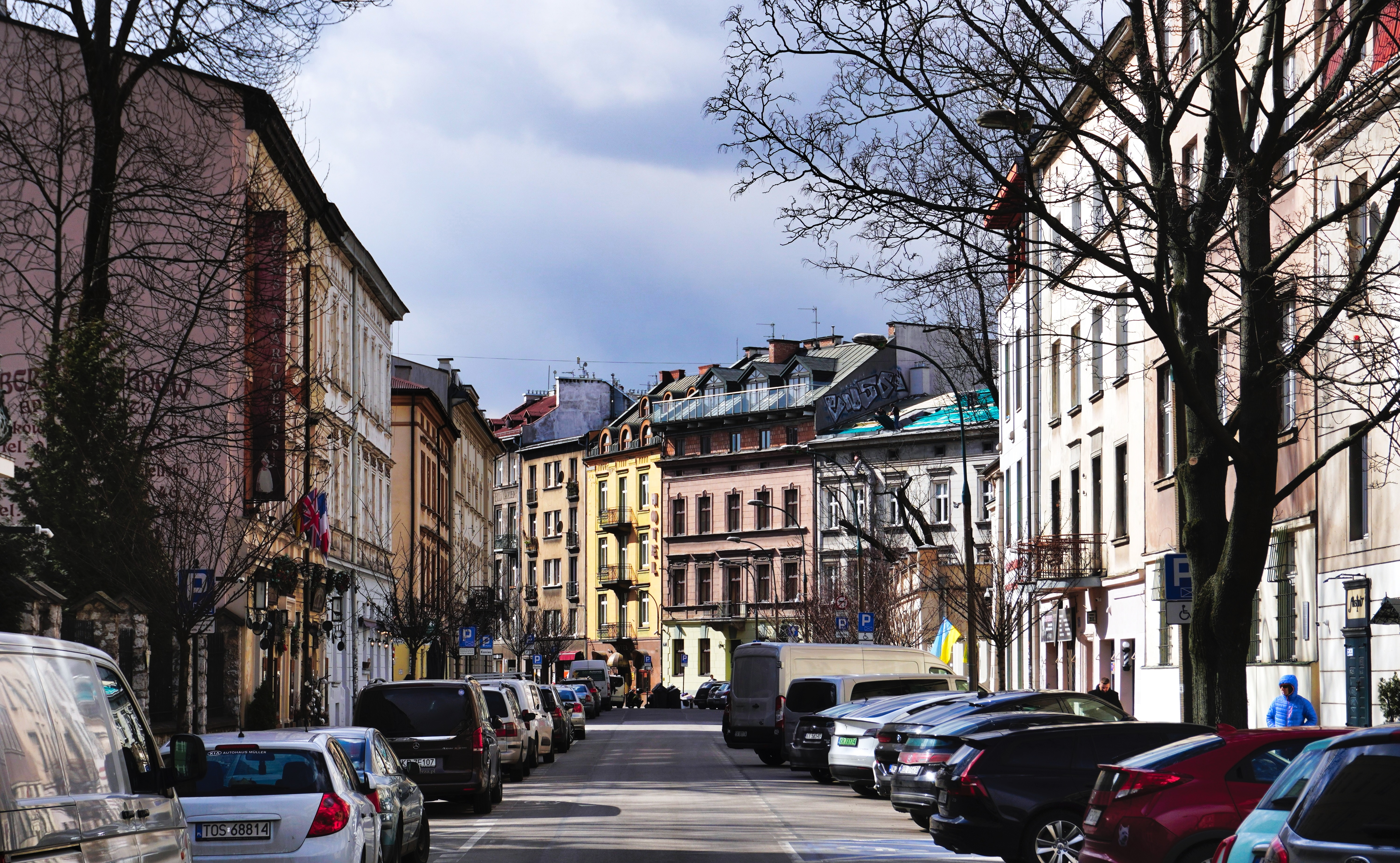
View from the intersection with Jakuba Street to the west

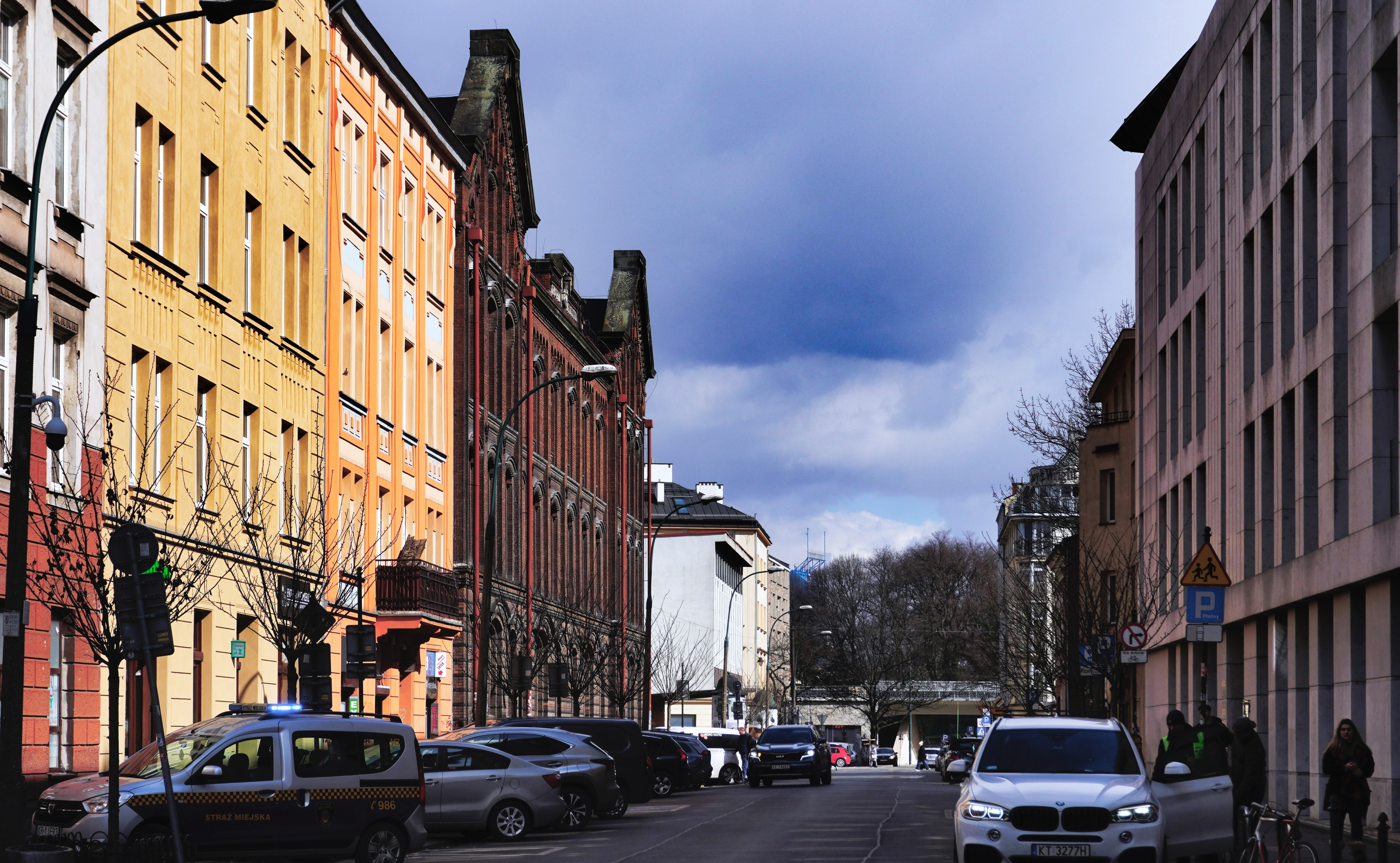
View from the intersection with Jakuba Street to the east
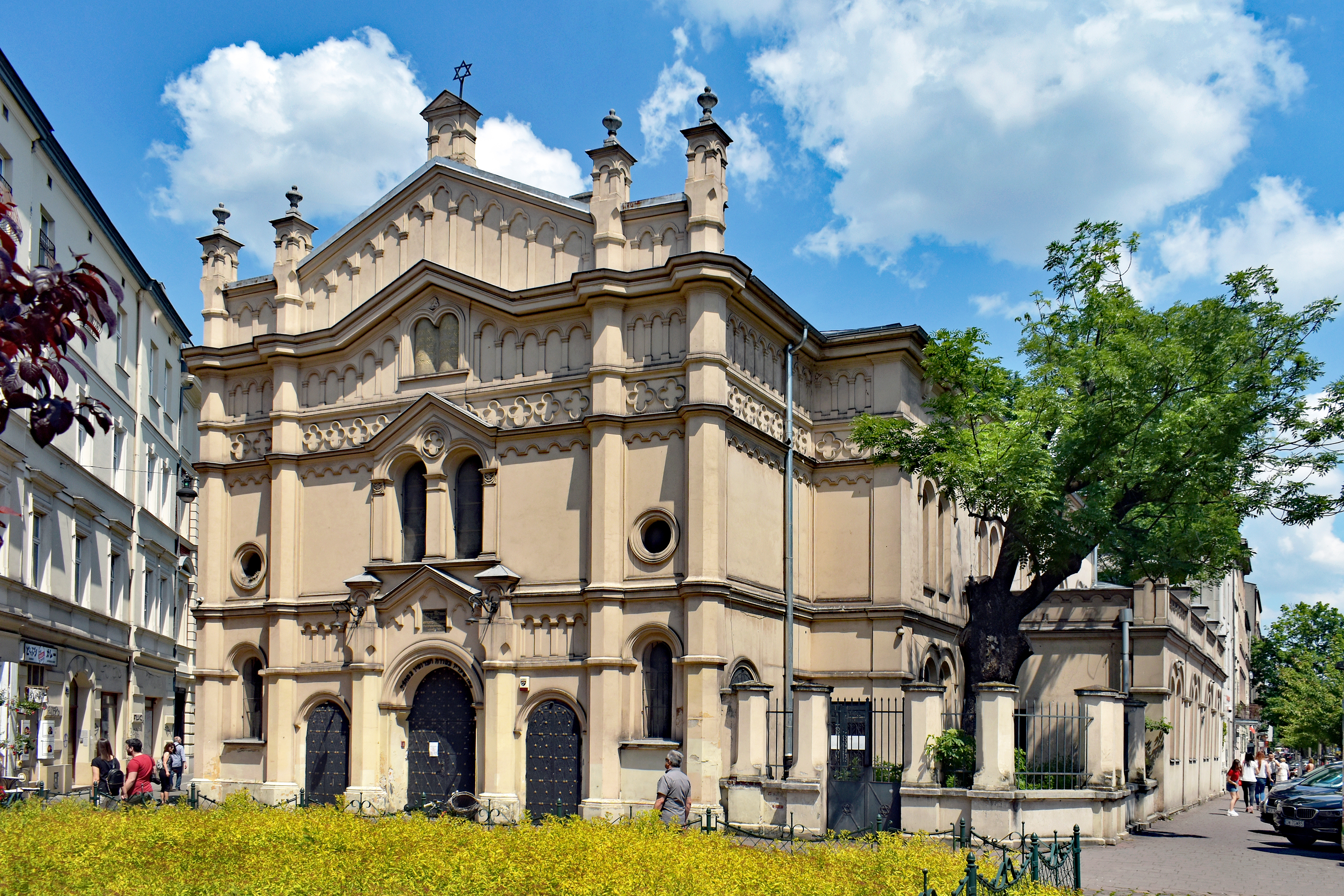
24 Miodowa Street
Tempel Synagogue

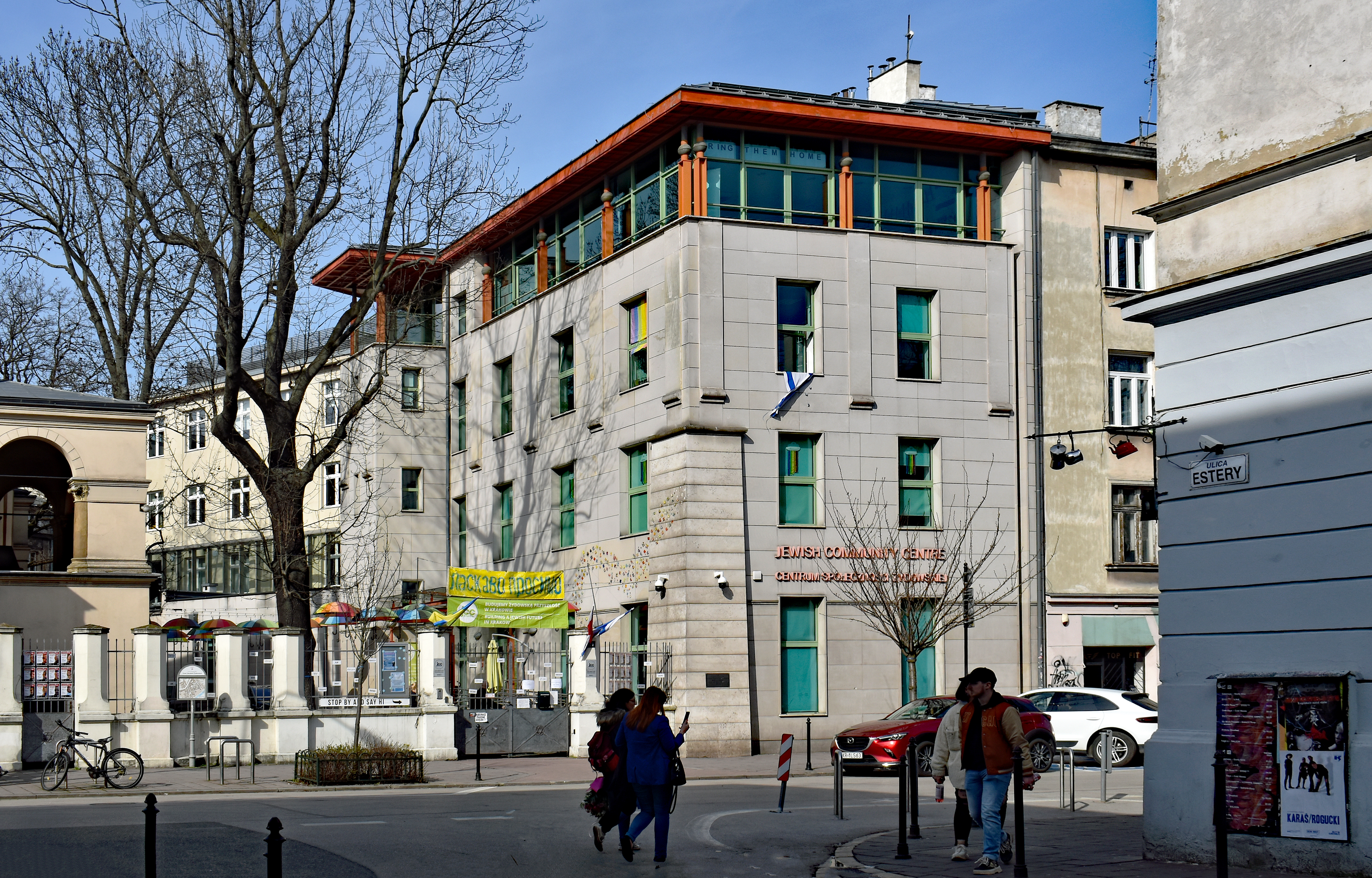
24 Miodowa Street
Jewish Community Center

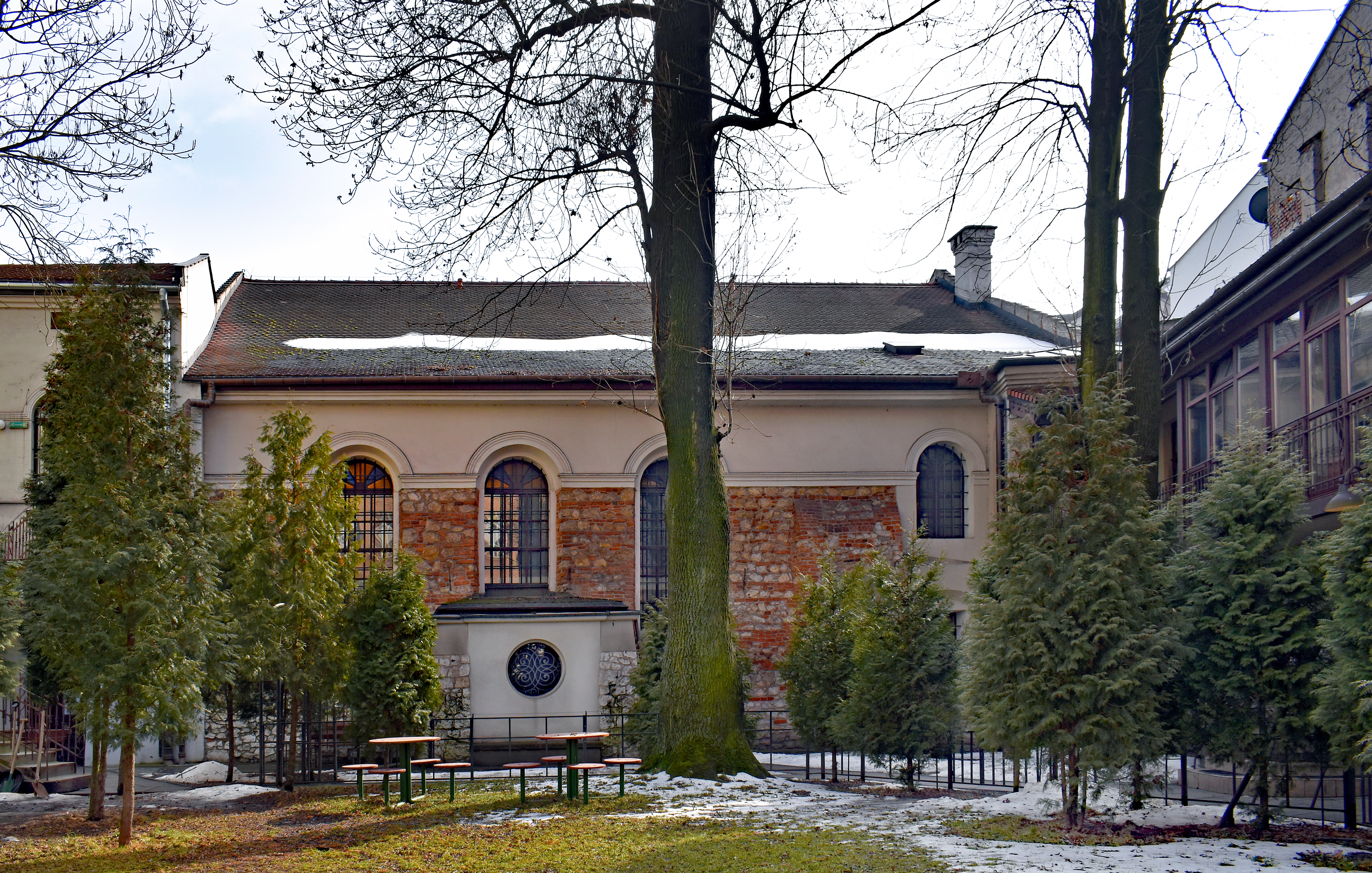
27 Miodowa Street
Kupa Synagogue

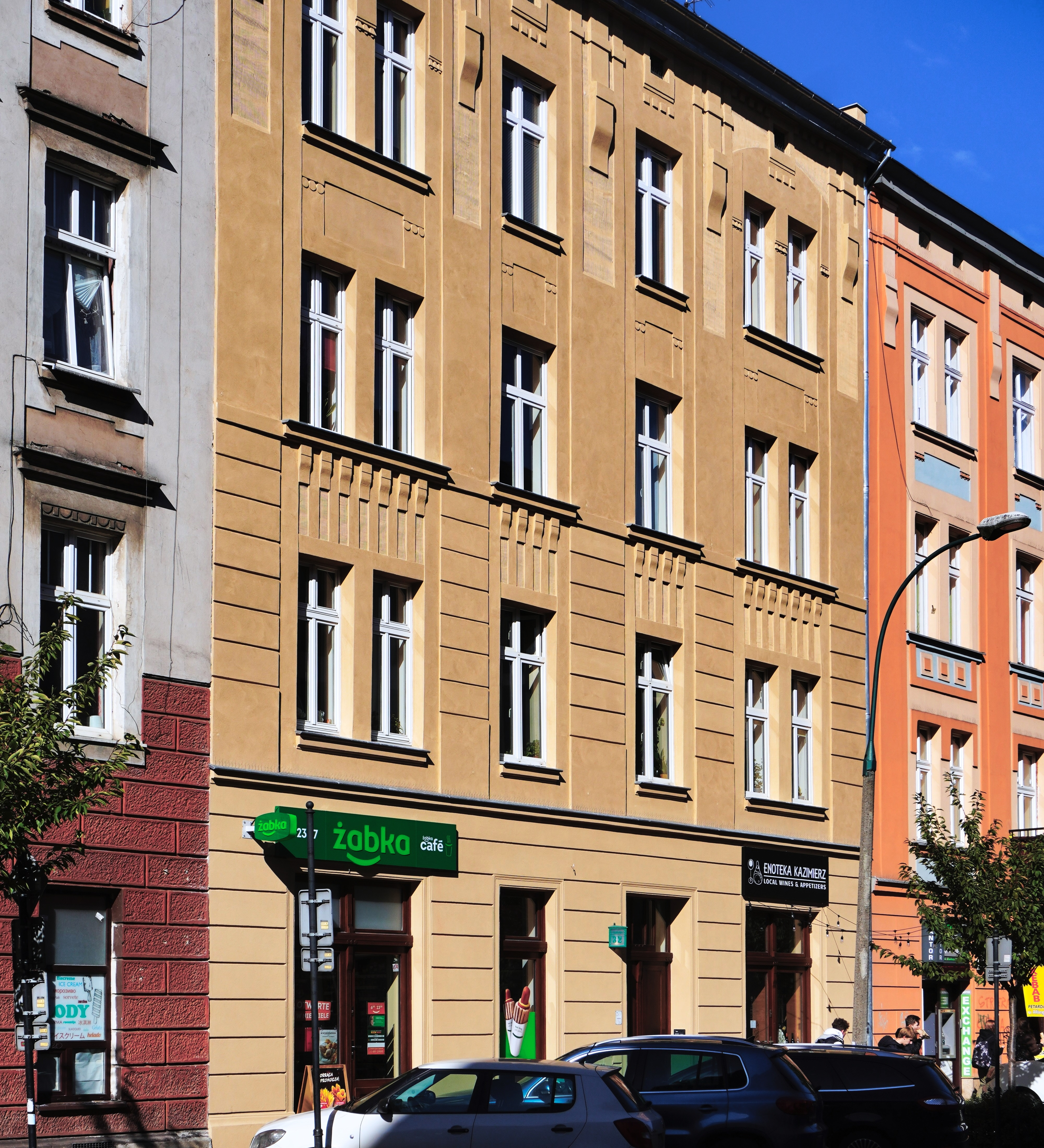
32 Miodowa Street
Tenement house (design. Jozue Oberleder, 1911)

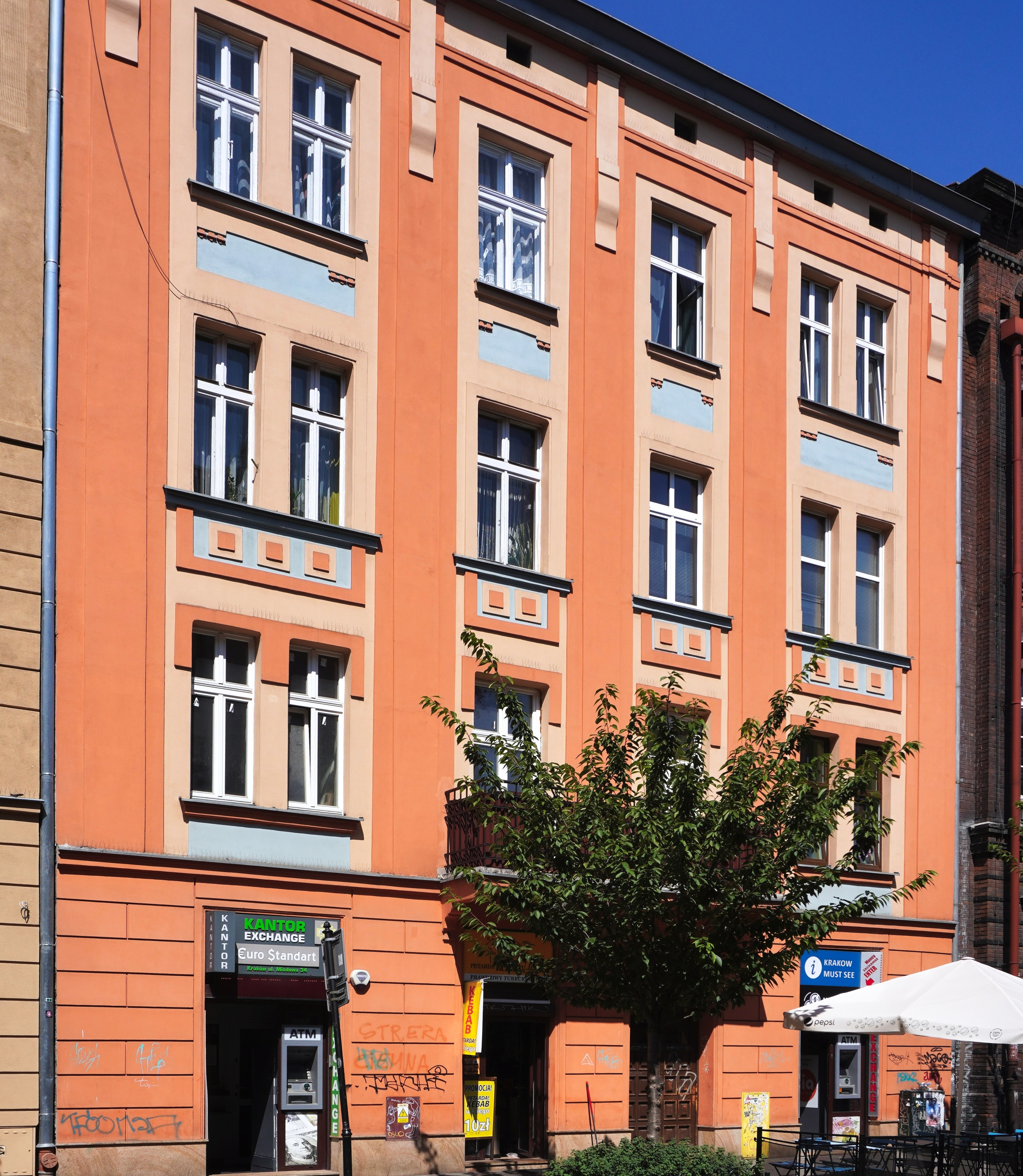
34 Miodowa Street
Tenement house (design. Jozue Oberleder, 1911)

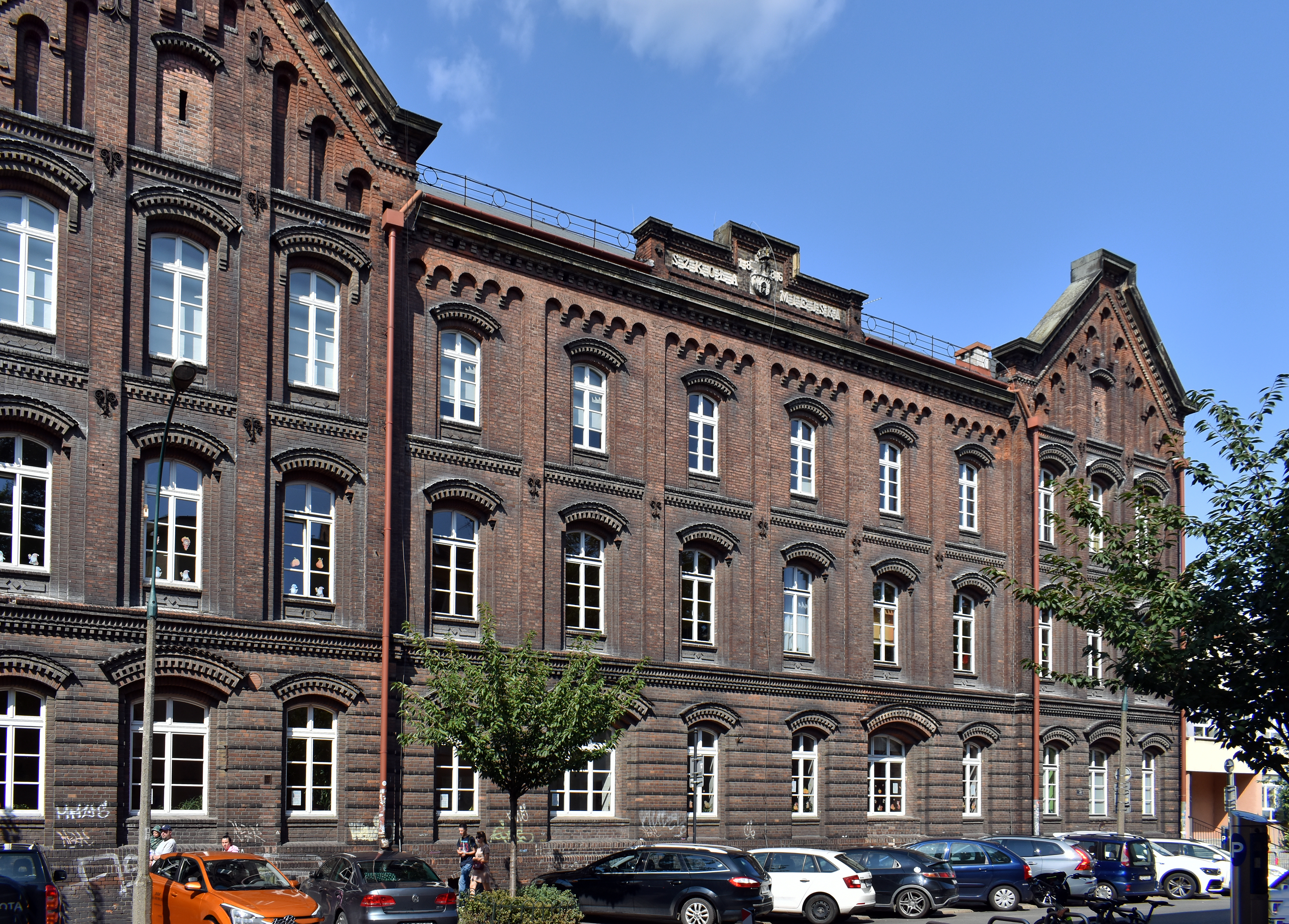
36 Miodowa Street
Former Municipal School named after Father Piramowicz

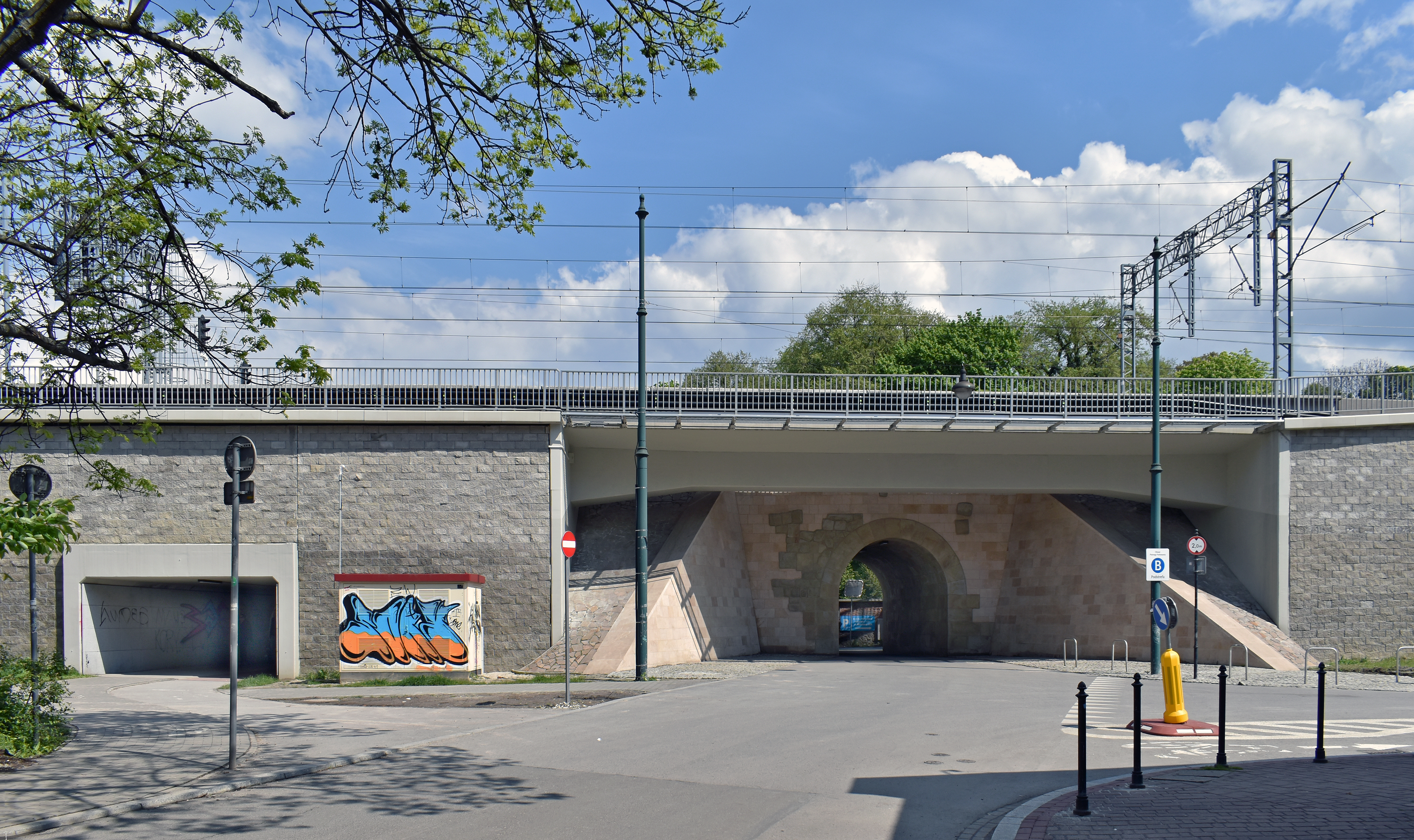
Road culvert under line 91. Built around 1855. After reconstruction (2024)

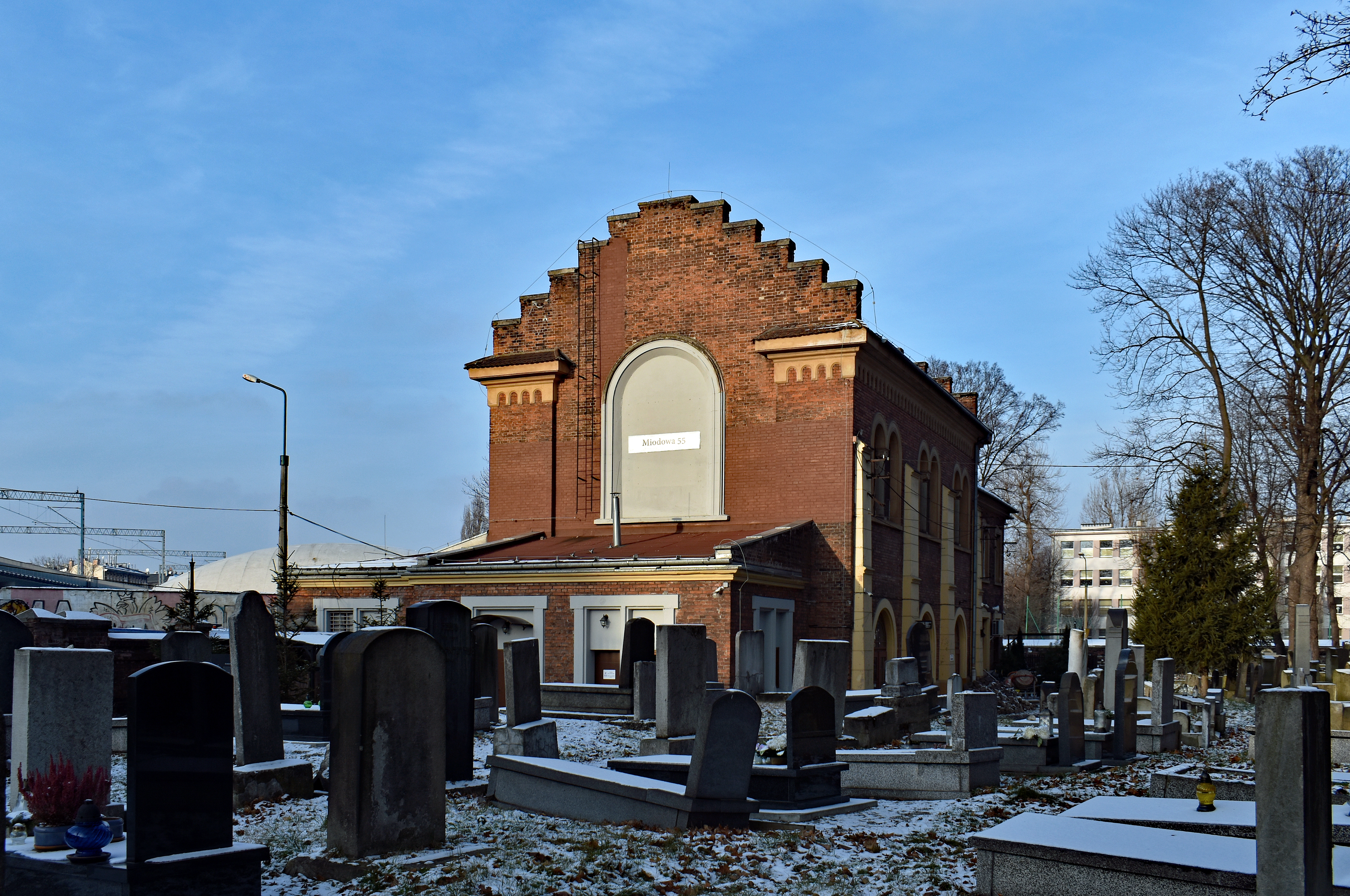
55 Miodowa Street
Funeral home

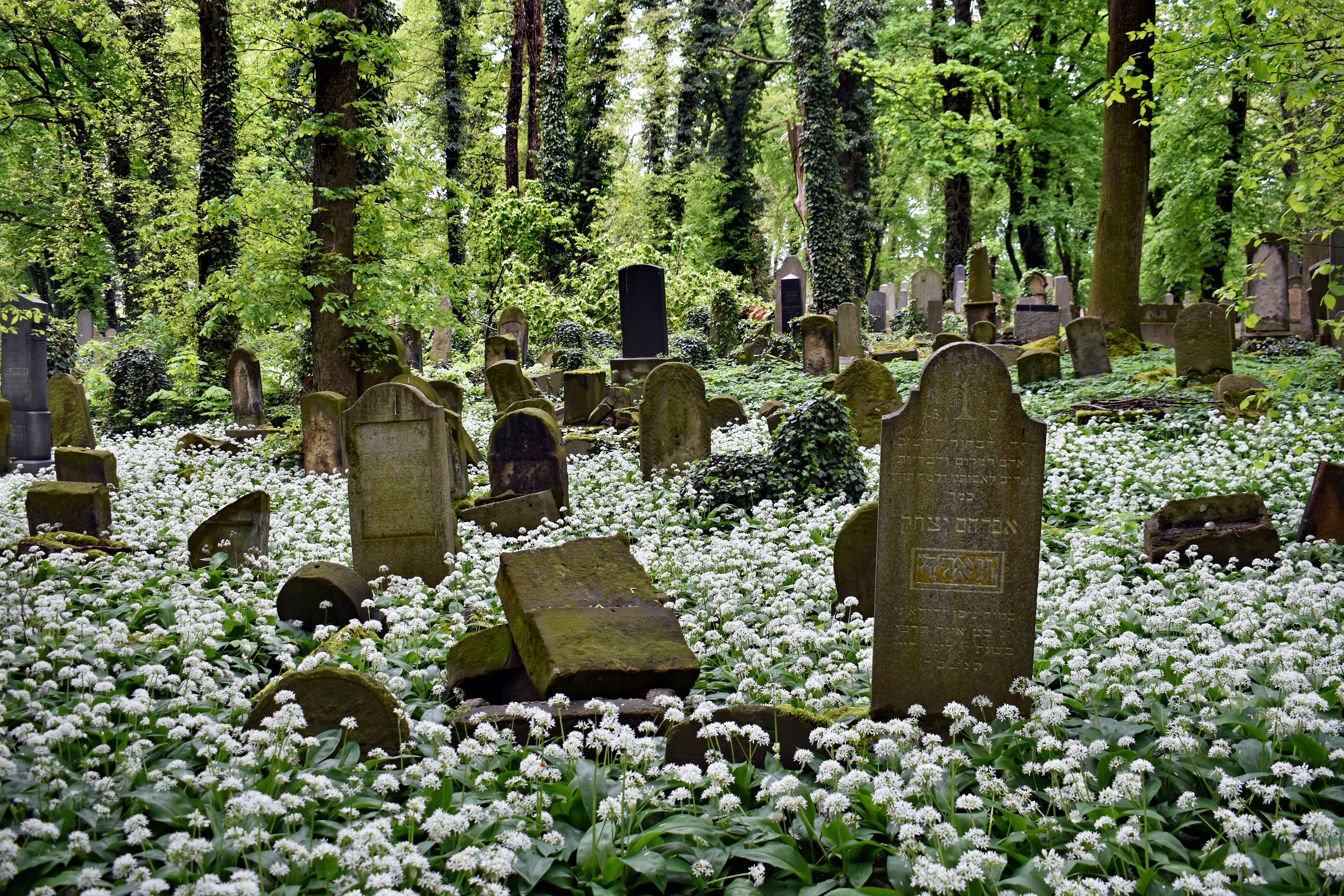
55 Miodowa Street
New Jewish Cemetery

== Bibliography ==
- (in Polish) * Elżbieta Supranowicz Nazwy ulic Krakowa, Instytut Języka Polskiego PAN, Kraków 1995, ISBN 83-85579-48-6 page 104 (Kraków street names)
- (in Polish) * Praca zbiorowa Encyklopedia Krakowa, wydawca Biblioteka Kraków i Muzeum Krakowa, Kraków 2023, ISBN 978-83-66253-46-9 volume I page 985 (Encyclopedia of Kraków)
