= Izaak Synagogue =

Orthodox synagogue in Kraków, Poland

- Polish: Synagoga Izaaka
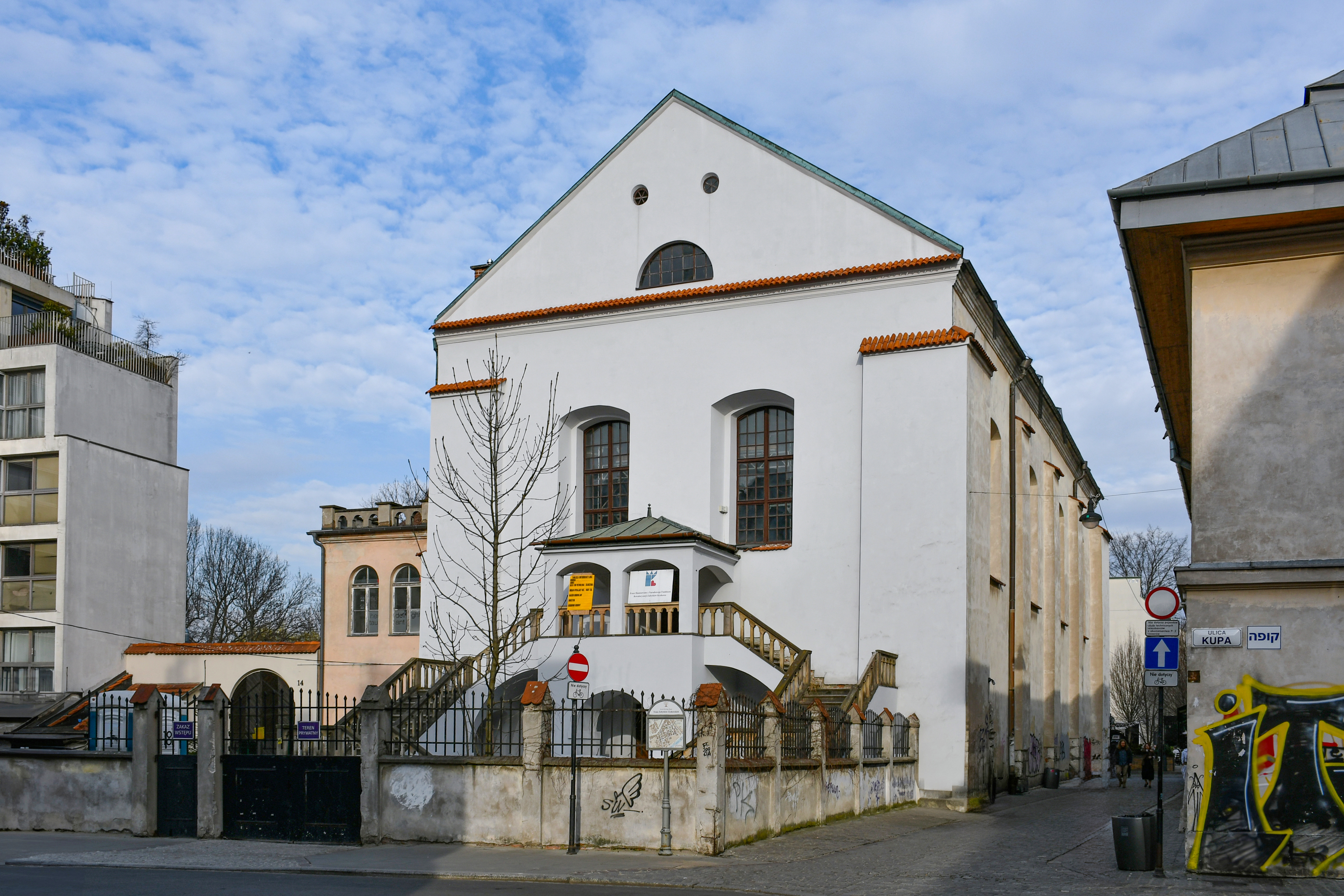
- The synagogue in 2025

Religion
- Affiliation: Orthodox Judaism
- Rite: Nusach Ashkenaz
- Ecclesiastical or organisational status: Synagogue
- Status: Active

Location
- Location: 14 Kupa Street; Kraków-Kazimierz
- Country: Poland
- Interactive map of Izaak Synagogue
- Coordinates: 50°03′06″N 19°56′48″E

Architecture
- Architect: Francesco Olivierri
- Type: Synagogue architecture
- Style: Baroque
- Groundbreaking: 1638
- Completed: 1644
- Materials: Stone

UNESCO World Heritage Site
- Type: Cultural
- Criteria: iv
- Designated: 1978
- Part of: Historic Centre of Kraków
- Reference no.: 29
- Region: Europe and North America

Historic Monument of Poland
- Designated: 1994-09-08
- Part of: Kraków historical city complex
- Reference no.: M.P. 1994 nr 50 poz. 418

The Izaak Synagogue (Polish: Synagoga Izaaka), formally known as the Isaak Jakubowicz Synagogue, is an Orthodox Jewish congregation and synagogue, located at 14 Kupa Street, in the historic Kazimierz district of Kraków, in the Lesser Poland Voivodeship of Poland. Designed by Francesco Olivierri in the Baroque style and completed in 1644, the synagogue is named for its donor, Izaak Jakubowicz (d. 1673), also called Isaac the Rich, a banker to King Ladislaus IV of Poland.

== History ==
The founding legend of the synagogue was first told by the early 19th-century Polish rebbe, Simcha Bunim of Peshischa. It went as follows: "Ayzik Jakubowicz, a pious but poor Jew, dreamed that there was treasure hidden under the old bridge in Prague. Without delay, he made his way there. On arrival, it turned out the bridge was guarded by a squad of soldiers and that digging was out of the question. Ayzik told the officer about his dream, promising him half of the booty. The officer retorted, "Only fools like Polish Jews can possibly believe in dreams. For several nights now I have been dreaming that in the Jewish town of Kazimierz there is hidden treasure in the oven of the home of the poor Jew Ayzik Jakubowicz. Do you think I am so stupid as to go all the way to Cracow and look for the house of this Isaac the son of Jacob?". Ayzik returned home immediately, took the oven apart, found the treasure and became rich. After this it was said: 'There are some things which you can look for the world over, only to find them in your own home. Before you realise this, however, you very often have to go on along journey and search far and wide.'"

=== During World War II ===
On 5 December 1939 the Gestapo came to the Kraków Judenrat building and ordered Maximilian Redlich, the Jewish official on duty that day, to burn the scrolls of the Torah. When Redlich refused he was shot dead.

Nazis destroyed the interior and furnishings, including the bimah and Aron Kodesh. After the war, the building was used by a sculpture and conservation atelier and then by a theatre company as workshop space and for the storage of props. Until recently it was an exhibition space. A fire in 1981 damaged the interior. A renovation was begun in 1983 and in 1989, with the fall of communism in Poland, the building was returned to the Jewish community. It is now a practicing Orthodox Synagogue once again.

== Architecture ==
The interior walls of the early Baroque building are embellished with painted prayers, visible after conservation removed covering layers of paint. The vaulted ceiling is embellished with baroque plasterwork wreaths and garlands. Before the Nazi occupation of Poland, the synagogue boasted a widely-admired, wooden, baroque Aron Kodesh. When the building was planned, the design was considered by some diocesan officials to be too beautiful for Jews to have, which led to delays in the synagogue’s construction. The synagogue is considered to be "the most architecturally important" of all the old synagogues of Kraków. The women's gallery and exterior stairs leading to it are a later addition to the building.

== Gallery ==
Interior (after renovation 2026)

Interior, main entrance and women's gallery (after renovation 2026)

Aron ha-Kodesh (Torah ark), 2026

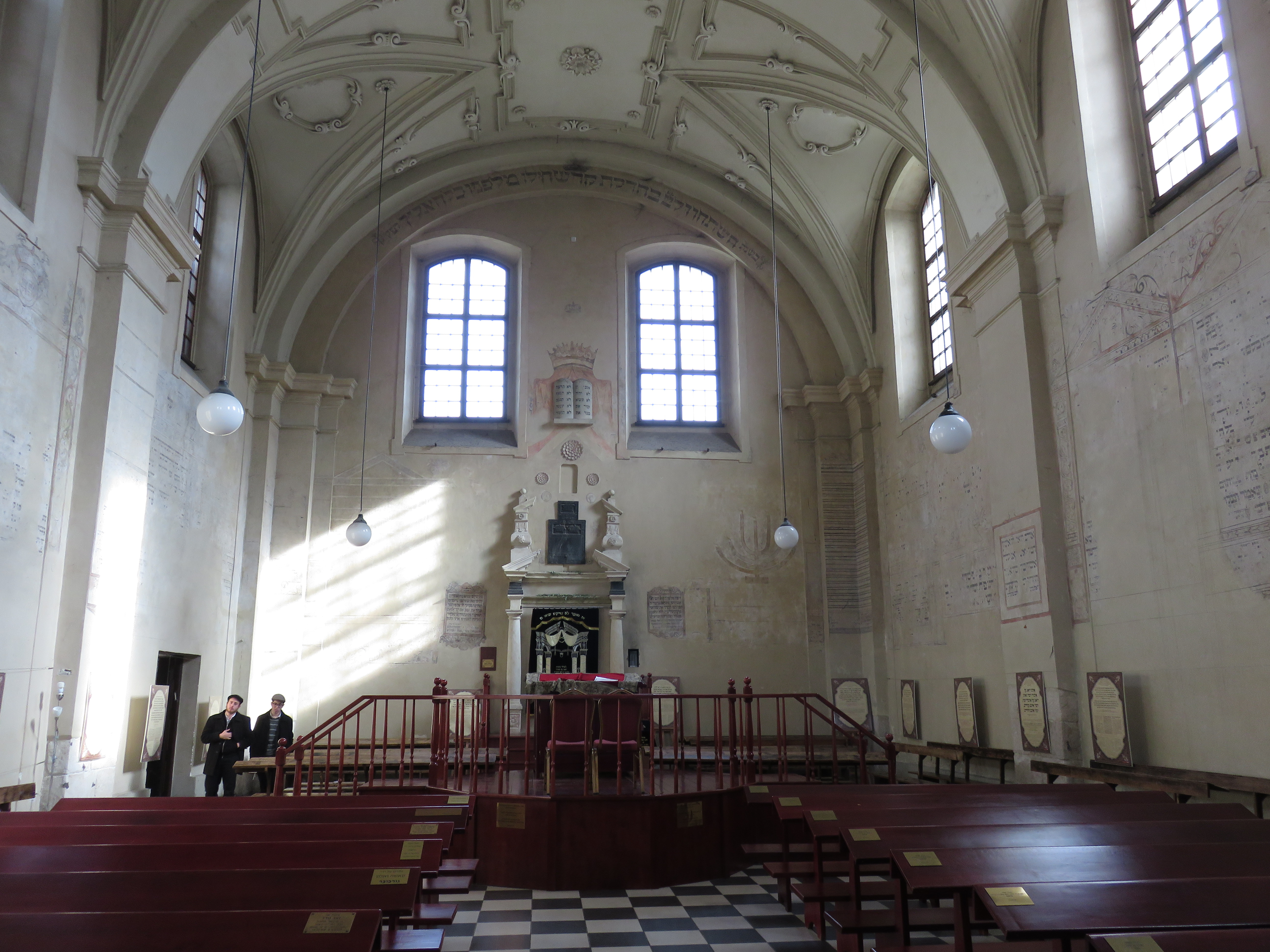
Interior of the synagogue (2016)

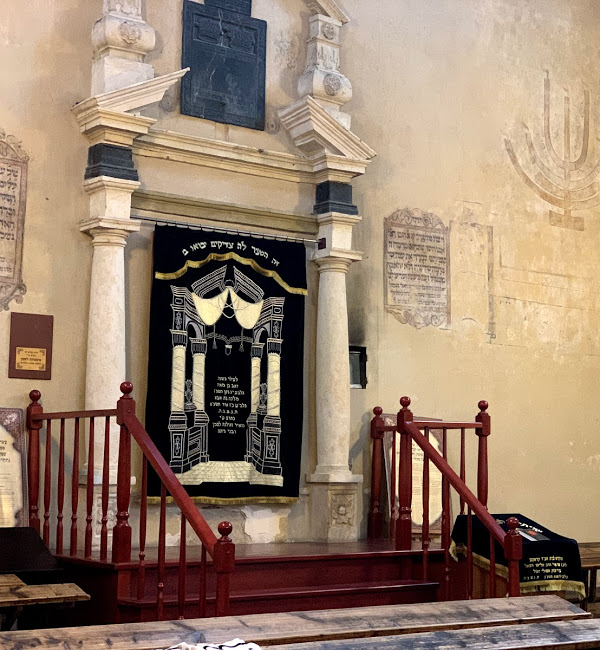
Torah ark of the synagogue (2019)

== See also ==
- Chronology of Jewish Polish history
- Culture of Kraków
- History of the Jews in Poland
- List of active synagogues in Poland
- Synagogues of Kraków
