= List of active synagogues in Poland =

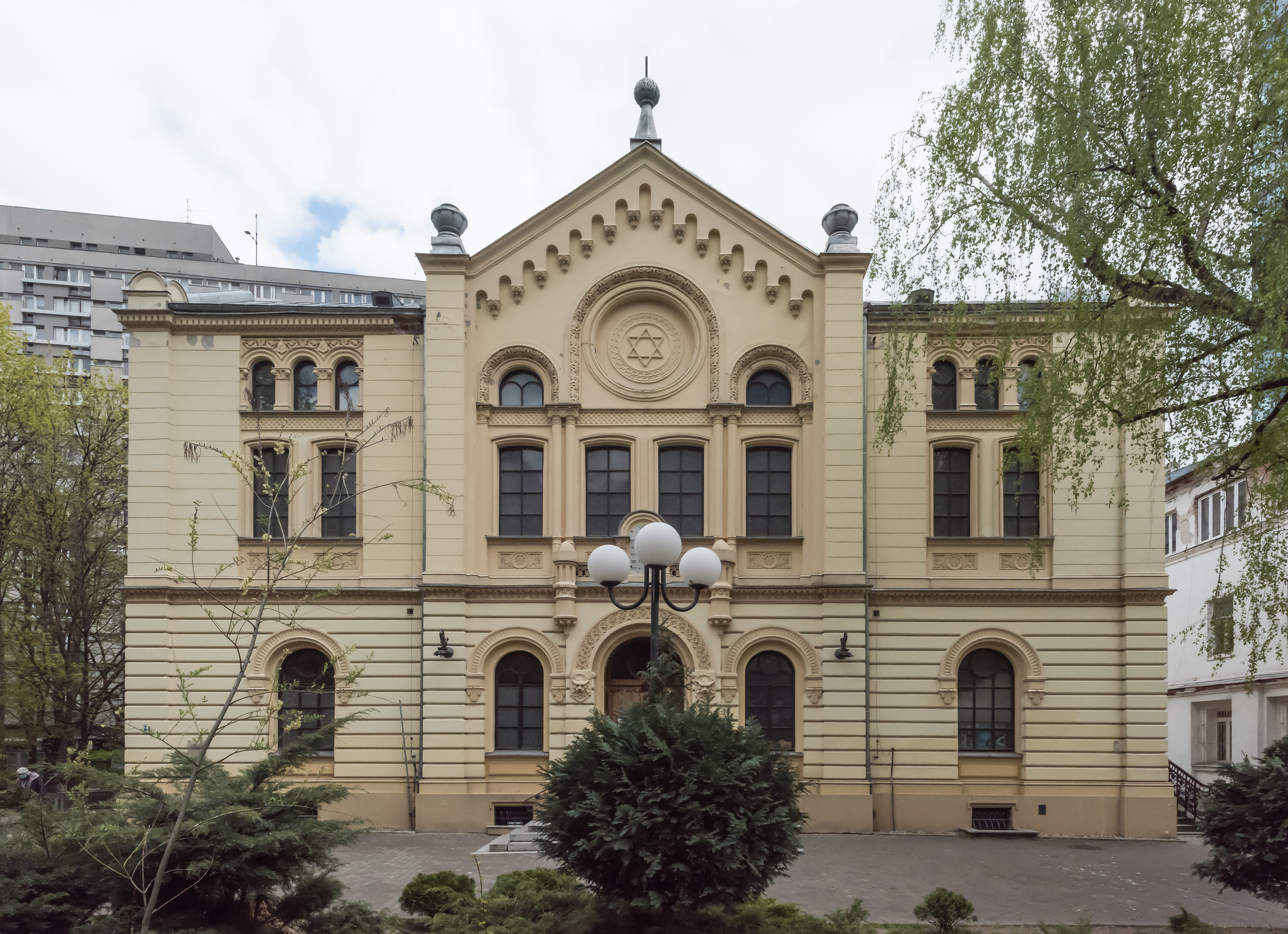
Nożyk Synagogue, Warsaw

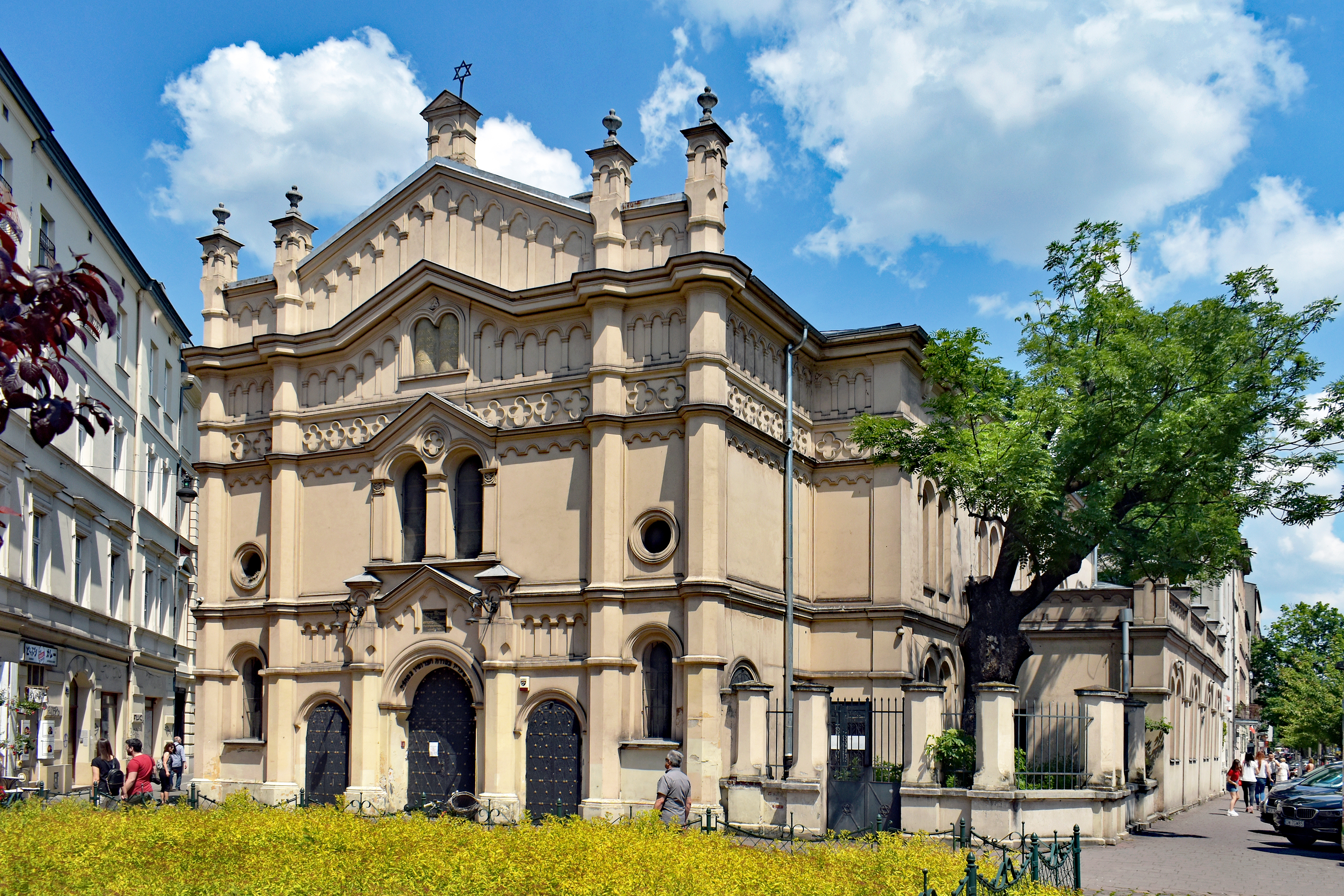
Tempel Synagogue, Kraków

White Stork Synagogue, Wrocław

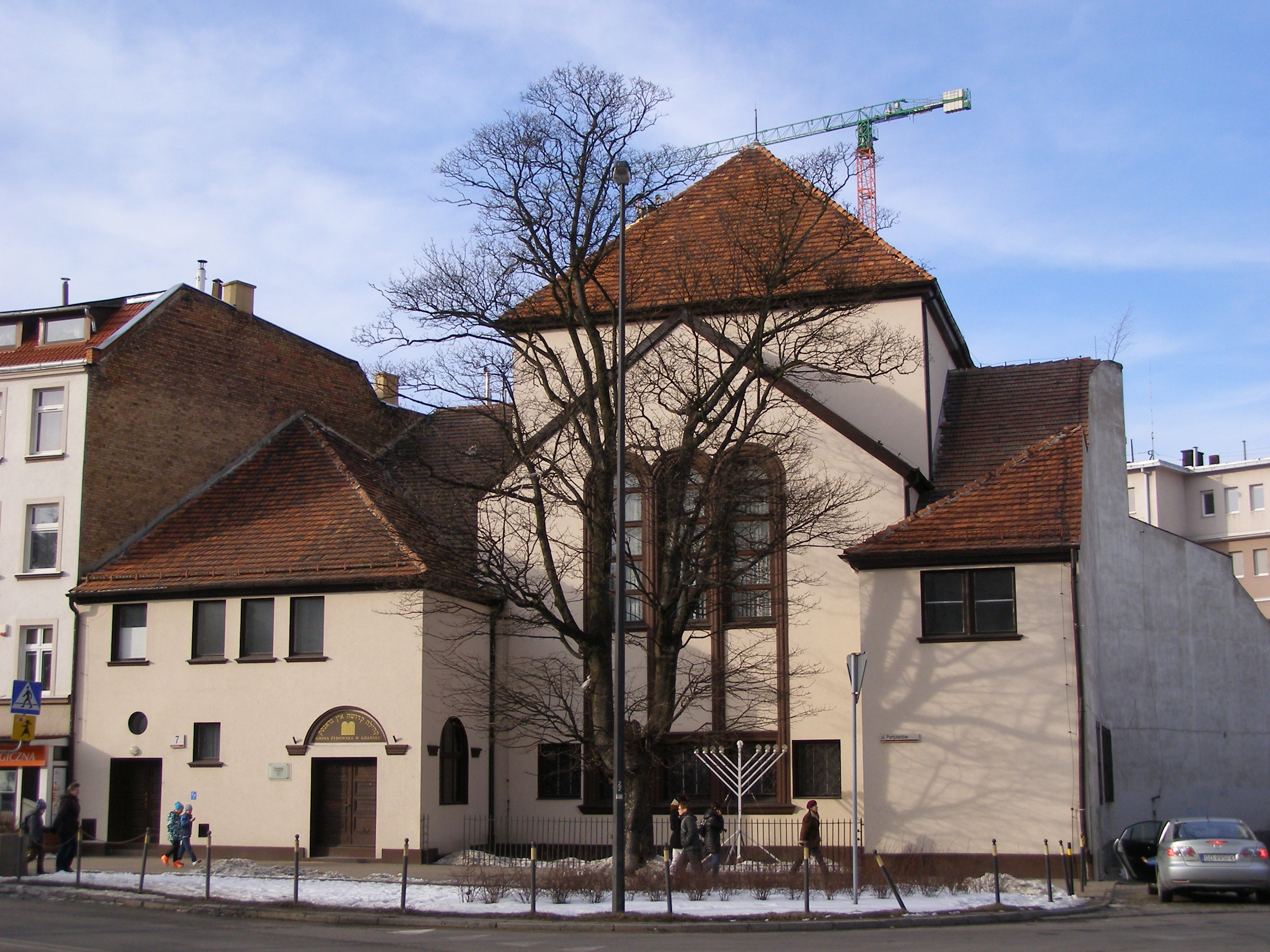
New Synagogue, Gdańsk

Before the Nazi German invasion of Poland in 1939, almost every Polish town had a synagogue or a Jewish house of prayer of some kind. The 1939 statistics recorded the total of 1,415 Jewish communities in the country just before the outbreak of war, each composed of at least 100 members (Gruber, 1995). Every one of them owned at least one synagogue and a Jewish cemetery nearby. Approximately 9.8% of all believers in Poland were Jewish (according to 1931 census).

The list of actives synagogues in Poland cannot possibly include the hundreds of synagogue buildings which still stand today in about 250 cities and towns across the country – seventy years after the Holocaust in Poland which claimed the lives of over 90% of Polish Jewry. Devoid of their original hosts, many synagogue buildings house libraries and smaller museums as in Kraków, Łańcut, Włodawa, Tykocin, Zamość, Radzanów, but many more serve as apartment buildings, shops, gyms and whatever else community needs require. This isn't necessarily bad however, because the synagogues which remain empty are usually worse off due to lack of maintenance.

== Active synagogues in Poland ==
The Union of Jewish Religious Communities in Poland (ZGWŻ) with branches in nine metropolitan centres helps the descendants of the Holocaust survivors in the process of recovery and restoration of synagogue buildings once owned by the Jewish Kehilla (קהלה), and nationalized in Communist Poland. The list of active and rededicated synagogues in the country include:

- Warsaw
  - Nożyk Synagogue
  - Chabad Lubavitch Synagogue (pl)
  - Beit Warszawa Synagogue - Związek Postępowych Gmin Żydowskich w Polsce
  - Masorti Synagogue - Synagoga konserwatywna w Warszawie
- Kraków
  - Remuh Synagogue
  - Tempel Synagogue
  - Izaak Synagogue
  - See also Synagogues of Kraków for a more complete list of 124 synagogue buildings with description of selected historical monuments of Jewish sacred architecture in the city
- Łódź
  - Reicher Synagogue (pl)
  - Pomorska Street Synagogue (pl)
- Lublin
  - Chewra Nosim (Chevrat Nossim) Synagogue (pl)
  - Chachmei Lublin Yeshiva Synagogue (Yeshivat Chachamei Lublin) (pl)
  - New Jewish Cemetery Synagogue (pl)
- Wrocław
  - White Stork Synagogue
  - Small Synagogue (pl)
- Gdańsk
  - New Synagogue (pl)
- Oświęcim Synagogue (Chevrah Lomdei Mishnayot Synagogue), Oświęcim
- Bajs Nusn (Beys Nusn) Synagogue (pl), Nowy Sącz

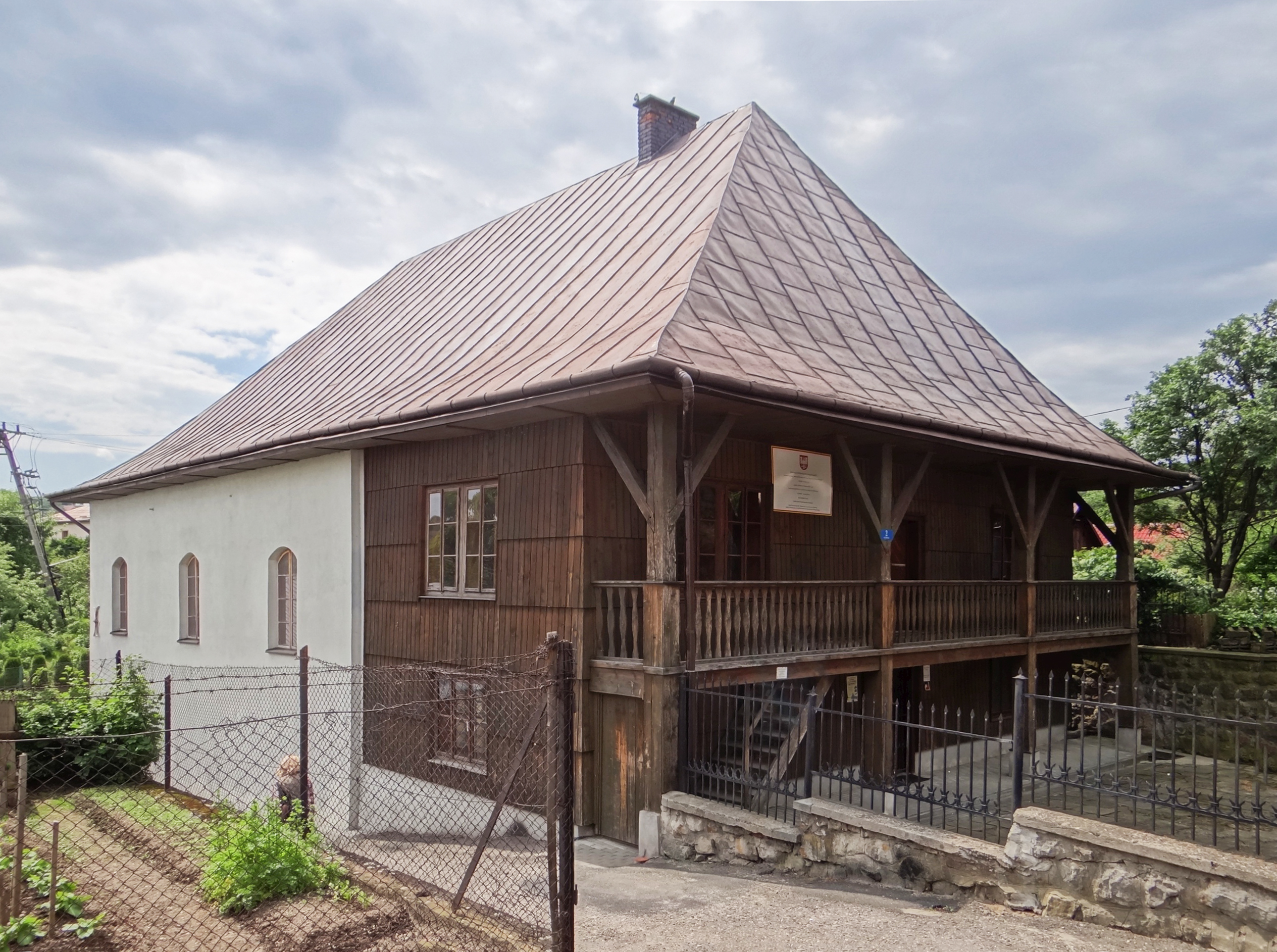
Bobowa Synagogue, Bobowa

- Bobowa Synagogue (pl), Bobowa
- Leżajsk Synagogue (pl), Leżajsk
- Lelów Synagogue (pl), Lelów
- Bielsko-Biała Synagogue (pl), Bielsko-Biała
- Gliwice Synagogue (pl), Gliwice
- Katowice Synagogue (pl), Katowice
- Legnica Synagogue (pl), Legnica
- Poznań Synagogue, Poznań
- Szczecin Synagogue, Szczecin
- Wałbrzych Synagogue, Wałbrzych
- Żary Synagogue, Żary
- Włodawa Synagogue, Włodawa
