= Katowice Synagogue =

Former synagogue in Katowice, Poland

Coordinates: 50°15′31.9054″N 19°01′10.0114″E

- Synagoga w Katowicach
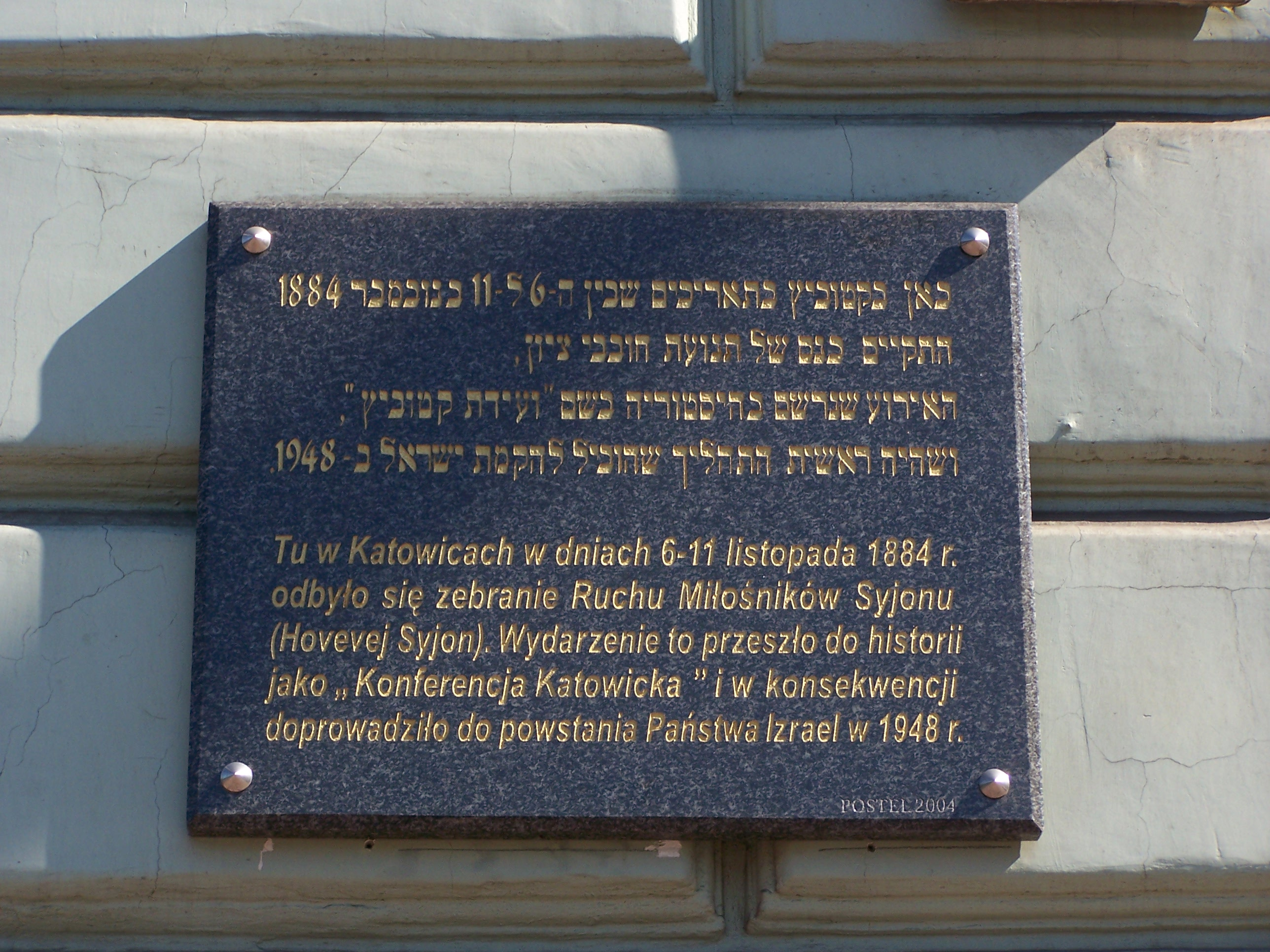

Religion
- Affiliation: Orthodox Judaism
- Status: Closed

Location
- Location: 13 Młyńska Street, Katowice
- Country: Poland
- Interactive map of Katowice Synagogue

Synagoga w Katowicach is a former synagogue, located in Katowice, Poland, at Młyńska Street 13.

The synagogue was founded after 1945 in the building of the Jewish Religious Community in Katowice. In March 2010, it was moved to new premises located in a tenement building at 3 Maja Street 16.
