= Tempel Synagogue (Kraków) =

Reform synagogue in Kraków, Poland

- Polish: Synagoga Tempel
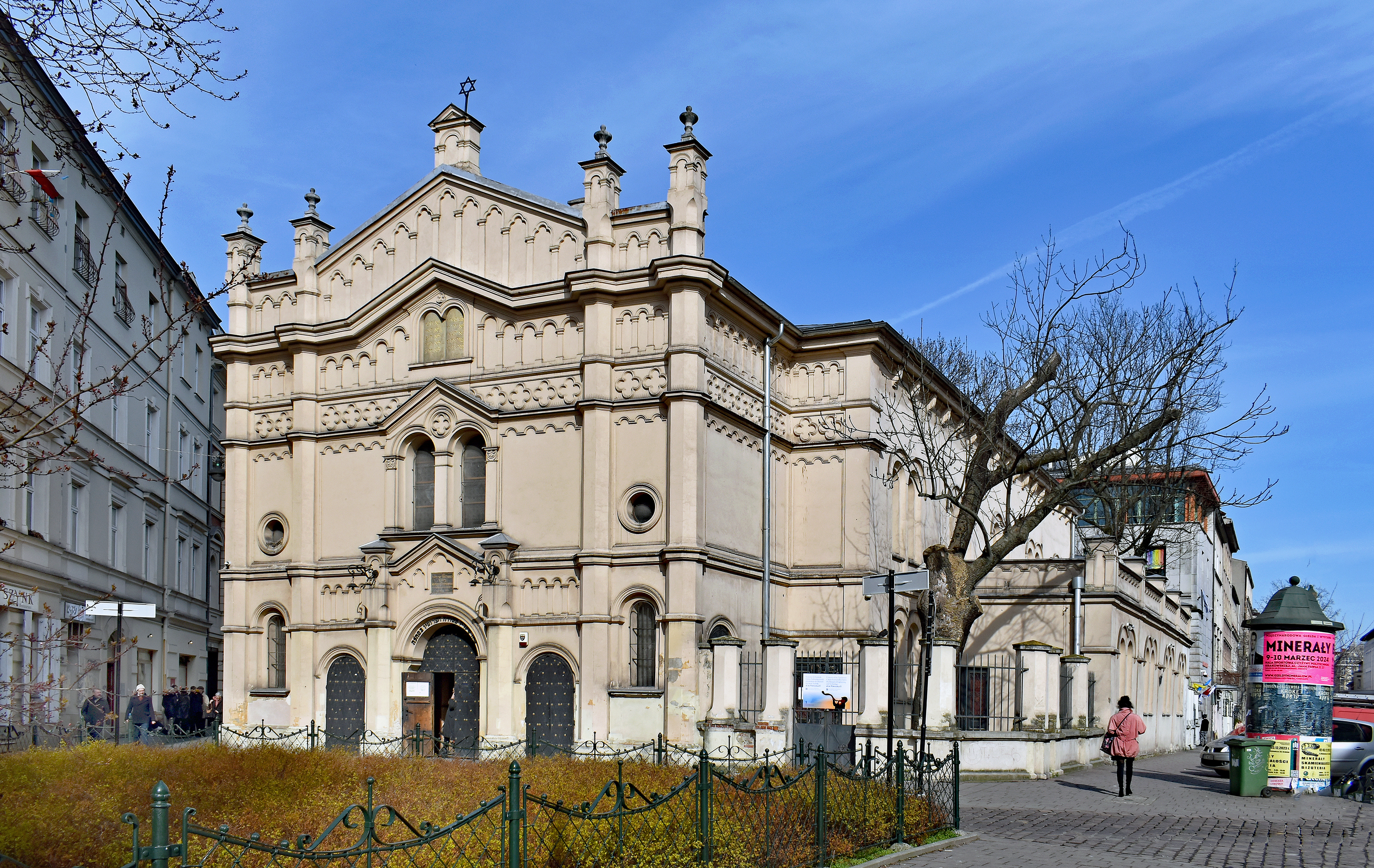
- The synagogue in 2024

Religion
- Affiliation: Reform Judaism
- Rite: Nusach Ashkenaz
- Ecclesiastical or organisational status: Synagogue
- Status: Active

Location
- Location: 24 Miodowa Street; Kazimierz; Kraków
- Country: Poland
- Interactive map of Tempel Synagogue
- Coordinates: 50°03′10.6″N 19°56′40″E

Architecture
- Architect: Ignacy Hercok
- Type: Synagogue architecture
- Style: Moorish Revival; Rundbogenstil
- Groundbreaking: 1860
- Completed: 1862

Specifications
- Dome: One
- Materials: Brick

UNESCO World Heritage Site
- Type: Cultural
- Criteria: iv
- Designated: 1978
- Part of: Historic Centre of Kraków
- Reference no.: 29
- Region: Europe and North America

Historic Monument of Poland
- Designated: 1994-09-08
- Part of: Kraków historical city complex
- Reference no.: M.P. 1994 nr 50 poz. 418

The Tempel Synagogue (Polish: Synagoga Tempel) also Progressive Synagogue (Polish: Synagoga Postępowa) is a Reform Jewish congregation and synagogue, located at 24 Miodowa Street, in the historic Kazimierz district of Kraków, Poland. Designed by Ignacy Hercok in the Moorish Revival and Rundbogenstil styles and completed in 1862, the synagogue is a major place of worship, and also a booming center of Jewish culture, which hosts numerous concerts and meetings, especially during the Kraków Jewish Culture Festival.

== History ==
The Moorish Revival and Rundbogenstil styled-building was designed by Ignacy Hercok, and built in 1860–1862 along Miodowa Street. The temple, with its tall central section flanked by lower wings, is designed on the pattern of the Leopoldstädter Tempel, in Vienna, Austria. At the time the synagogue was built, Kraków was part of the Austro-Hungarian Empire. The richly finished interior is adorned with dense patterns painted in many colors and copious amounts of gold leaf, but the patterns, with the exception of the exquisite Moorish design on the ceiling, are not stylistically Moorish. The arch over the Aron Kodesh with its pattern of alternating tall and short houses is more in the style of Polish folk art than anything Islamic. The Aron Kodesh is covered by a gold-leaf dome that evokes the dome over the Sigismund Chapel in the nearby Wawel Cathedral.

The synagogue was desecrated during World War II by the German Nazis, who used the building as ammunition storage area. After the war, it was used again for prayers. In 1947, a mikvah was built in the northern part of the synagogue. Regular prayers were held until 1985. A large inflow of financial contributions from private donors around the world allowed the synagogue to undergo a vast renovation from 1995 until 2000. It is still active today, although formal prayers are held only a few times a year.

== Gallery ==
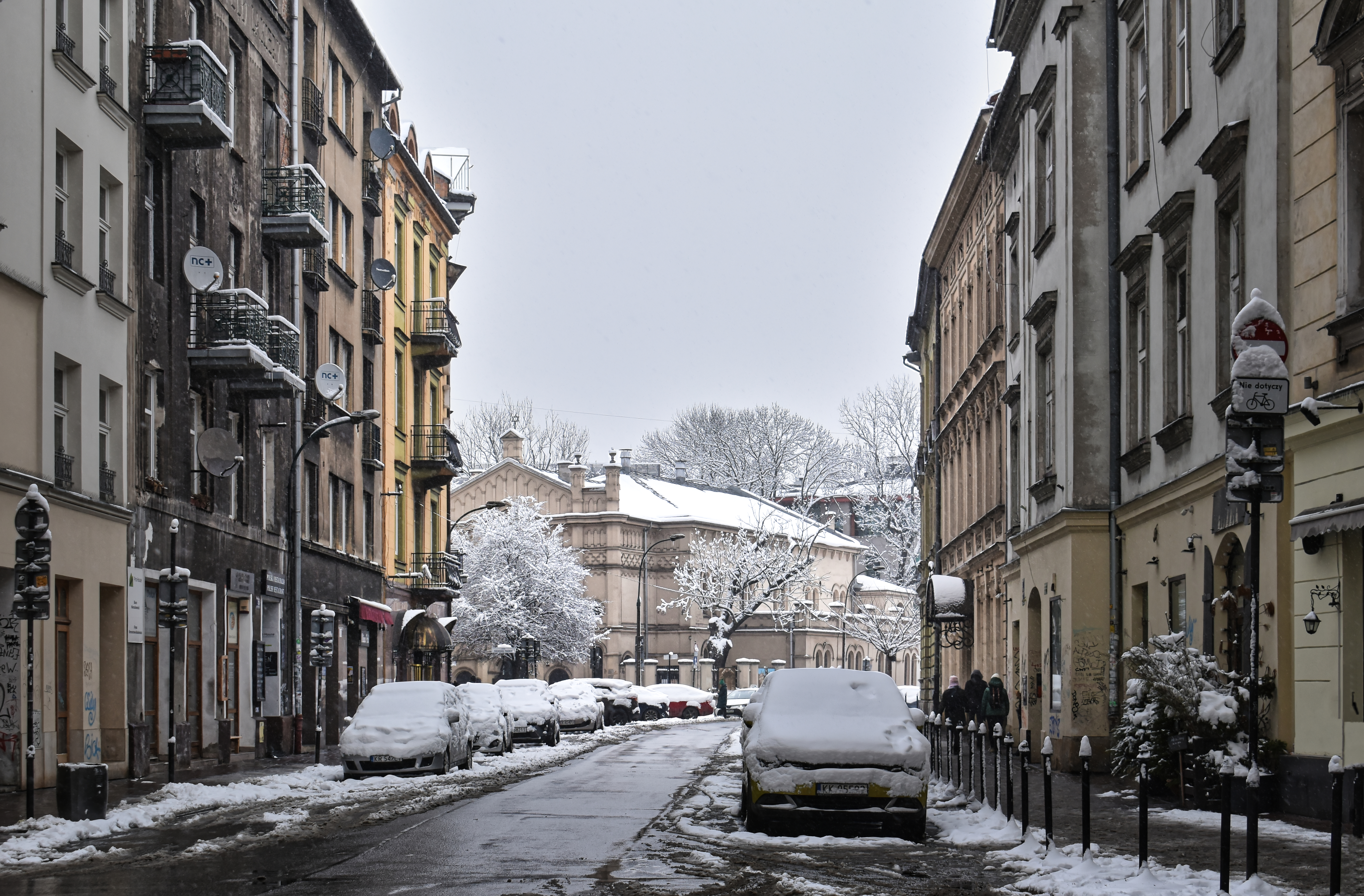
Miodowa Street and Tempel Synagogue

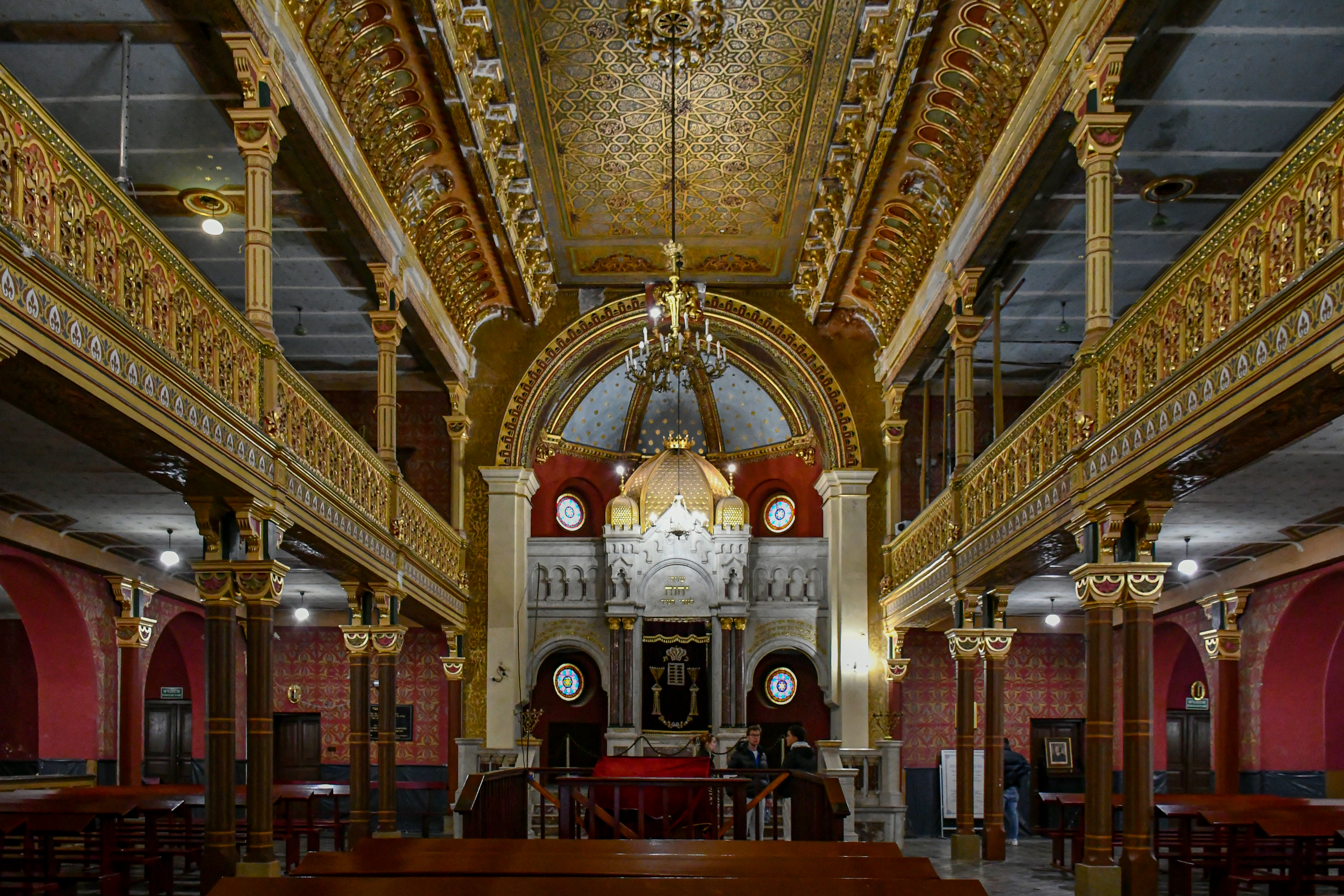
Interior of the synagogue

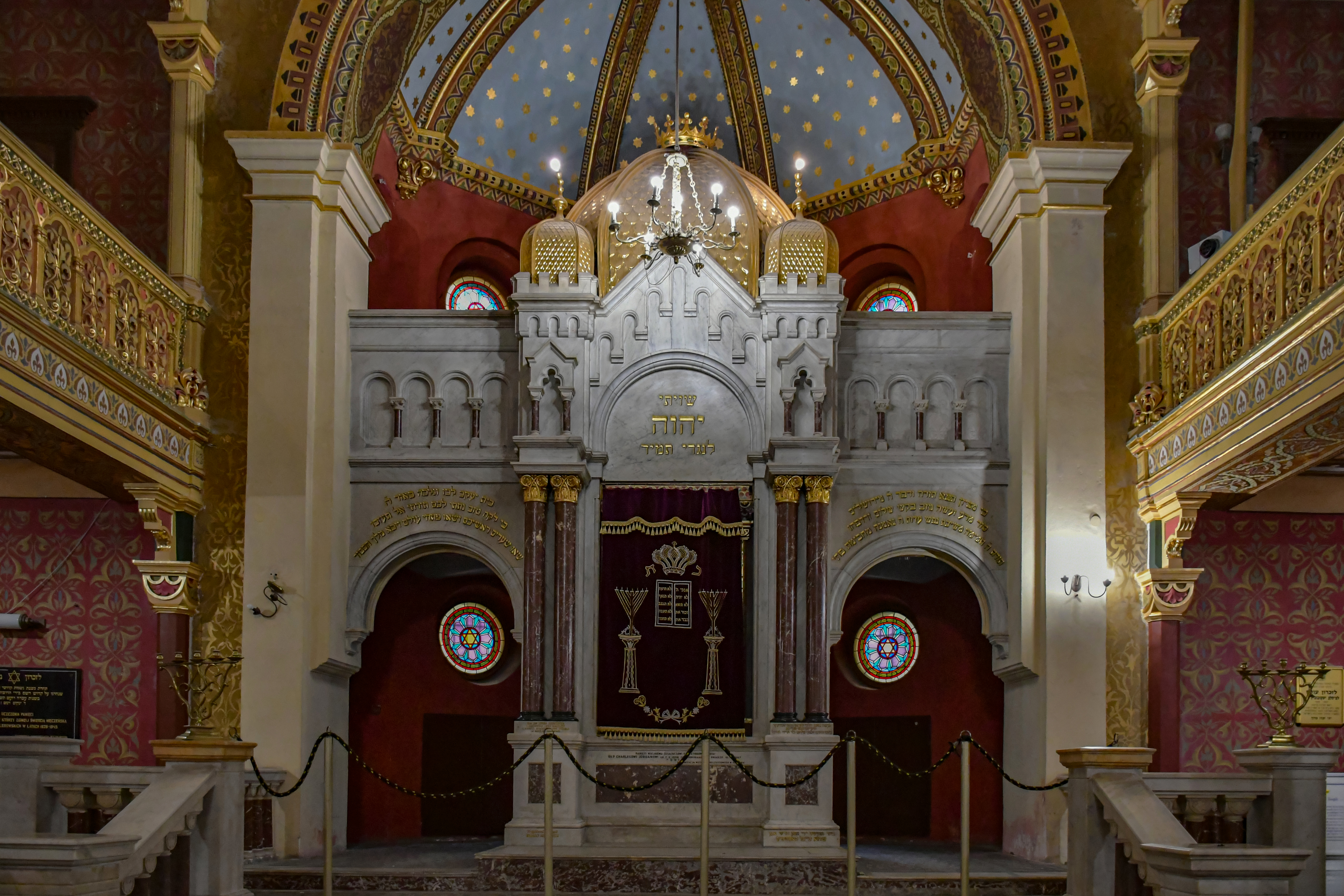
Torah ark (Aron ha-Kodesh)

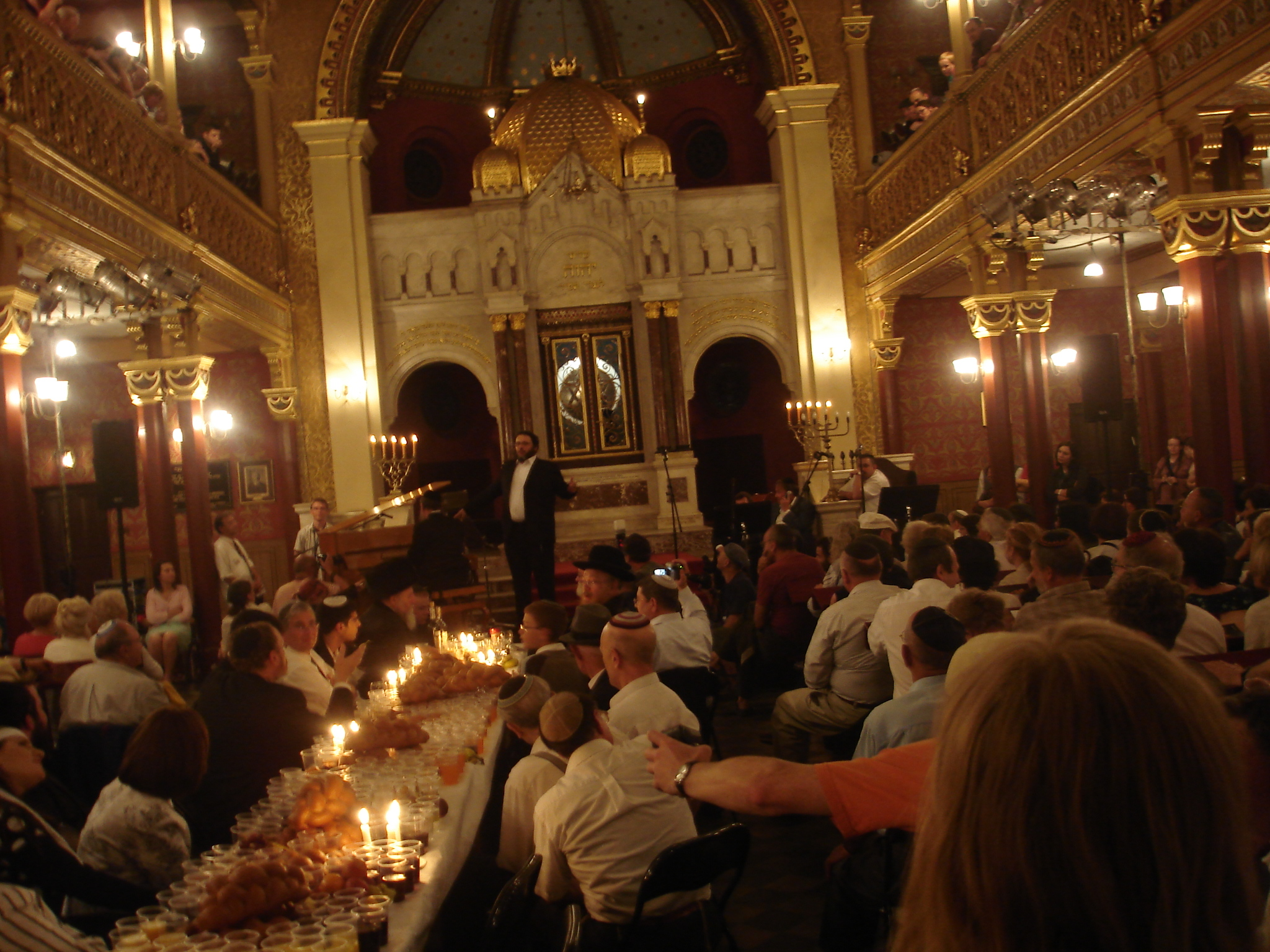
Melaveh Malkah in Tempel Synagogue

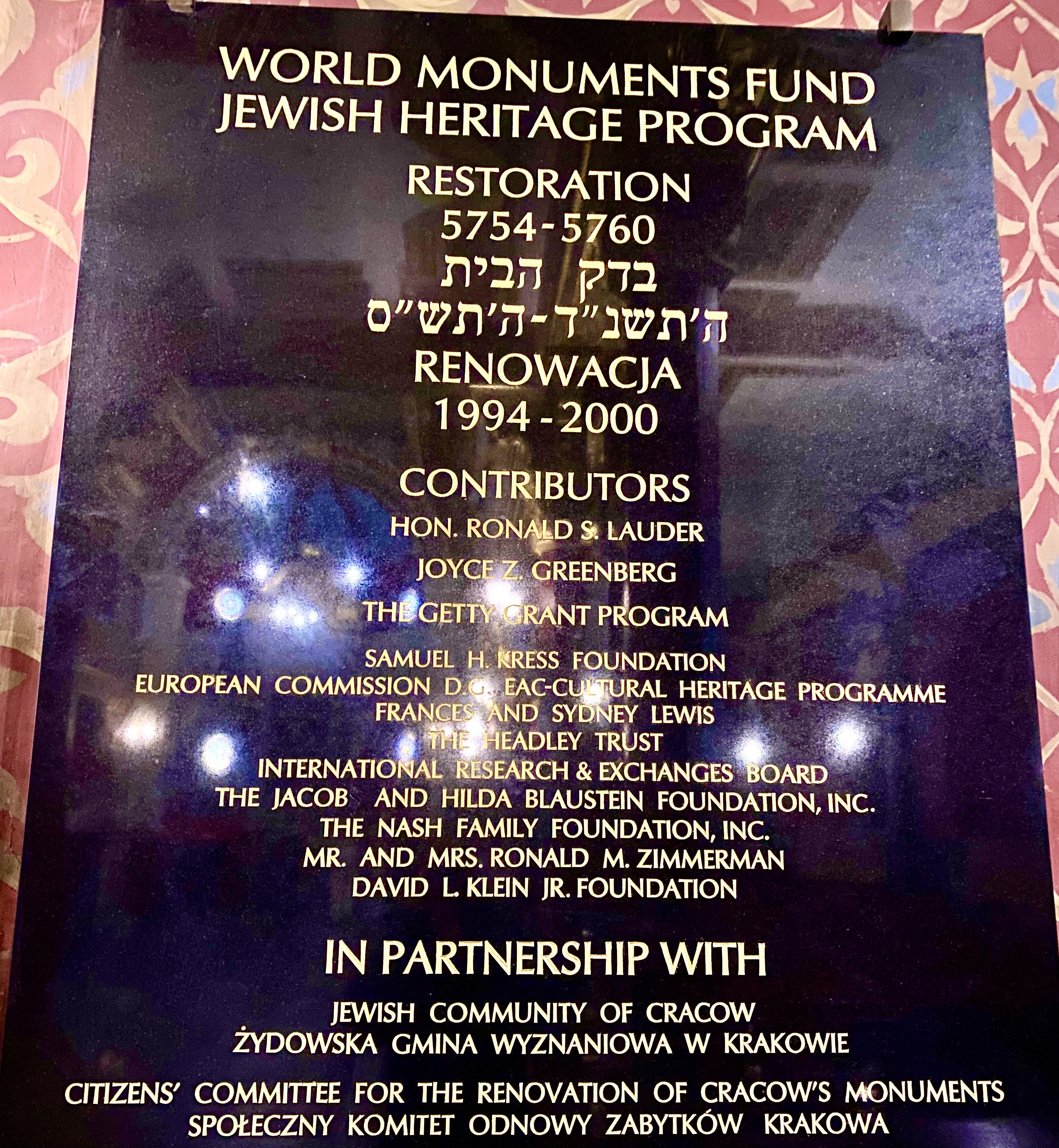
Acknowledgement plaque in the synagogue listing the names of the contributors, both individuals and organisations

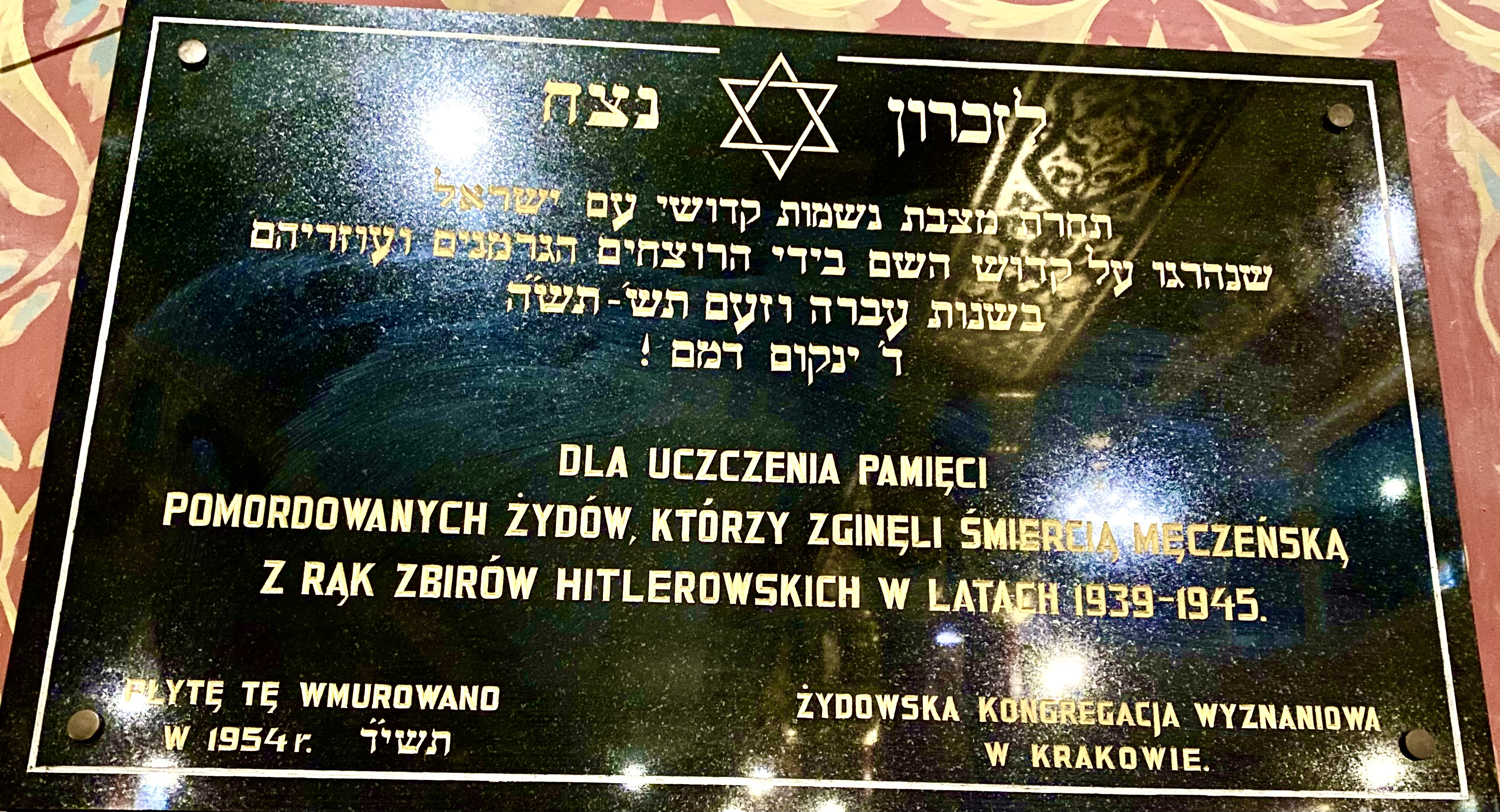
WWII memorial plaque in the synagogue

== See also ==
- Chronology of Jewish Polish history
- Culture of Kraków
- History of the Jews in Poland
- List of active synagogues in Poland
- Synagogues of Kraków
