= American Jewish cuisine =

Food, cooking, and dining customs associated with American Jews

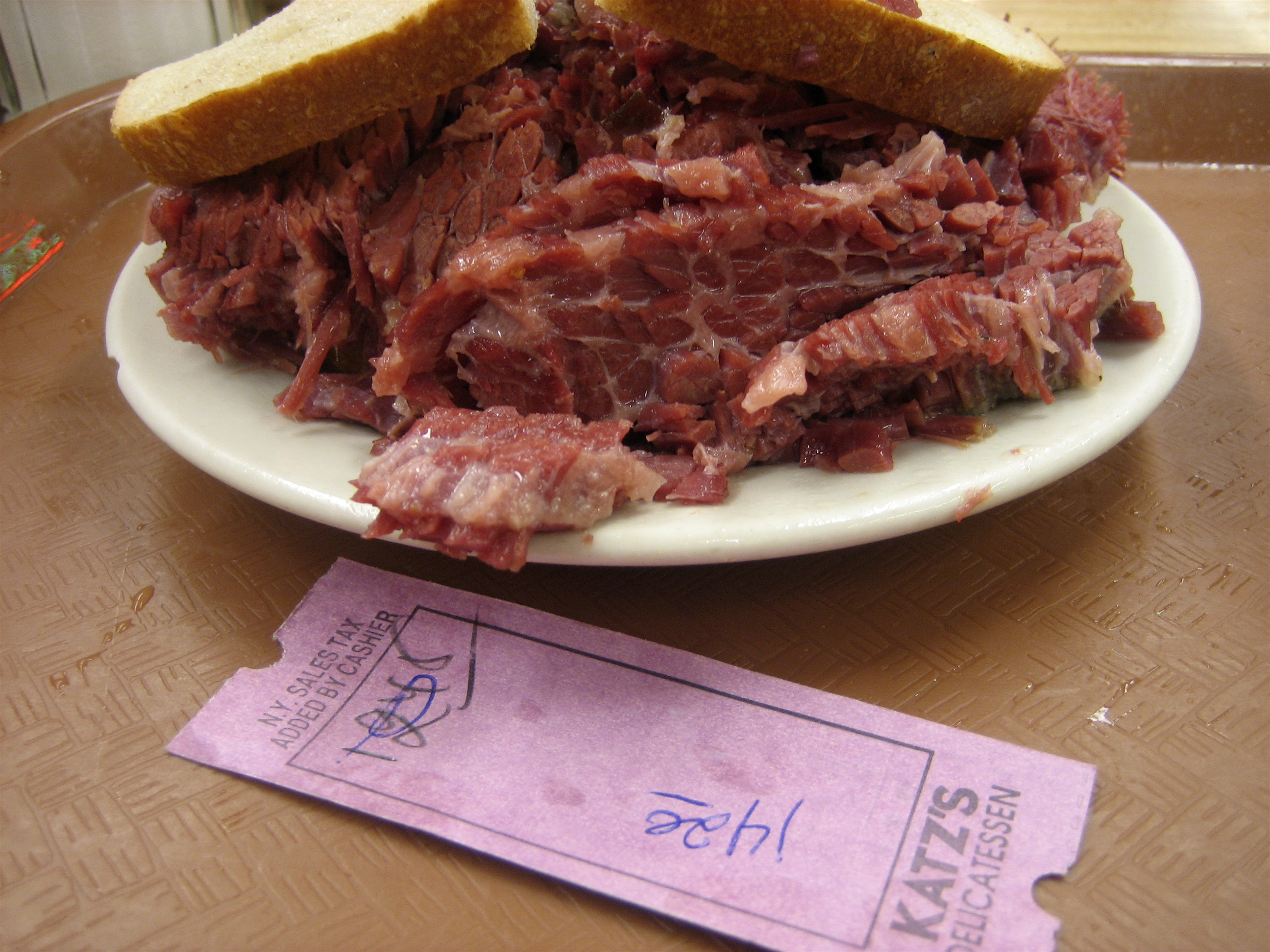
A corned beef sandwich at Katz's Delicatessen, a kosher-style deli in New York City

American Jewish cuisine comprises the food, cooking, and dining customs associated with American Jews. It was heavily influenced by the cuisine of Jewish immigrants who came to the United States from Eastern Europe around the turn of the 20th century. It was further developed in unique ways by the immigrants and their descendants, especially in New York City and other large metropolitan areas of the northeastern U.S.

== History ==
Between 1881 and 1921, around 2.5 million Jews immigrated to the United States from Eastern Europe. Most of them settled in large cities in the northeastern part of the country, especially New York, Philadelphia, Boston, Cleveland, Chicago, and Baltimore. These immigrants brought with them a well-developed culinary heritage. The cuisine continued to evolve in America, in the homes of the immigrants and their descendants, and in delicatessens and appetizing stores in New York City and elsewhere.

Delicatessens were quite popular among second-generation American Jews, especially in the mid-twentieth century. They provided a place for the patrons to socialize in a comfortable environment. They also popularized some of the dishes now associated with American Jewish cuisine, which were affordable for their upwardly mobile customers, but which would have seemed luxurious to their European ancestors. Though not as numerous as they once were, delicatessens continue to be popular dining destinations.

== Kosher food ==
Kosher food is food that conforms to kashrut, i.e. Jewish dietary laws. Under these rules, some foods – for example, pork and shellfish – are forbidden. Any meat must come from an animal that was slaughtered using a process known as shechita. Jewish dietary law also prohibits the eating of meat and milk at the same meal. For this purpose, "meat" means the flesh of mammals and birds, and "milk" includes dairy products such as cheese and butter. Thus a kosher delicatessen selling corned beef sandwiches would not have any cheese, and a kosher bakery selling bagels and cream cheese would not have any meat. Many foods are classified as pareve (sometimes spelled "parve") – neither meat nor milk, and therefore acceptable at any meal. Pareve foods include fish, eggs, honey, and any edible plant. Kosher commercial establishments must be closed from Friday evening to Saturday evening, during the Jewish sabbath.

American Jewish cuisine may or may not be kosher. For example, some delicatessens follow Jewish dietary law in the preparation and serving of food, while others do not. Followers of Orthodox Judaism, the most traditional form of Judaism, generally eat only kosher food. Some other more-observant Jews also eat kosher food most or all of the time. However, the majority of American Jews are less observant of traditional rules, and eat non-kosher food. According to a 2012 study by the Pew Research Center, 22 percent of American Jews keep kosher in their homes.

=== Kosher-style food ===
Kosher-style food is food that is made in the style of kosher food but that does not necessarily conform to Jewish dietary laws. For example, a kosher-style hot dog is an all-beef hot dog that is mildly spiced with garlic and other flavorings, and a kosher-style pickle is a sour pickle aged in brine with garlic and dill. The term "kosher-style" may also refer to American Jewish cuisine in general. The Reuben sandwich, a kosher-style staple, is not kosher because it combines Swiss cheese and corned beef.

== Passover ==
During the annual eight-day Passover holiday, Jews who are more traditionally observant do not eat chametz (leavened bread). During Passover some American Jews eat matzah and other foods that conform to this restriction.

American Jews, like Jews elsewhere in the world, often participate in a Passover seder at the beginning of Passover. This is a ritual meal that includes the telling of the story of Passover – the Exodus of the Jews from Egypt. At a seder, the Passover Seder plate is a plate with special food items that are symbolic of different aspects of Passover.

== Ashkenazi, Sephardic, and Mizrahi cuisine ==
Around 90% of American Jews are Ashkenazi Jews, whose ancestors came from Eastern or Central Europe, where many of them spoke Yiddish as their first language. The foods commonly associated with American Jewish cuisine therefore have their origins in those regions.

The United States also has a sizeable population of Sephardic Jews, whose ancestors lived in Spain or Portugal, and later in other Mediterranean areas, and Mizrahi Jews, whose ancestors lived in the Middle East or North Africa. Sephardic and Mizrahi Jews have their own distinct cuisines, which, like Ashkenazi cuisine, were heavily influenced by their places of origin. Although always outnumbered by their Ashkenazi counterparts, there are significant Sephardic and Mizrahi communities across America. These include the Persian Jews of Los Angeles, the Moroccan Jews of Manhattan, the Turkish Jews of Seattle, and the Syrian Jews of Brooklyn. Additionally, Mizrahi and Sephardic cuisine predominates in the modern state of Israel.

Therefore, Middle Eastern and Mediterranean dishes such as falafel, hummus, couscous, and shakshouka are also part of American Jewish cuisine.

== Litvaks and Galitzianers ==
The two largest groups of Eastern European (Ashkenazi) Jews were Litvaks, who lived farther to the north and east, in the area of Lithuania, and Galitzianers, who lived farther to the south and west, in the area of Galicia. Each group spoke their own dialect of Yiddish. According to some writers, it is sometimes possible to guess the ancestry of an American Jew by knowing their preferred style of gefilte fish. Litvaks ate gefilte fish that was flavored with salt and pepper, while Galitzianers preferred theirs to be sweeter. The border between the areas where Litvaks and Galitzianers lived has therefore been referred to as the "Gefilte Fish Line".

== Popular dishes and foods ==
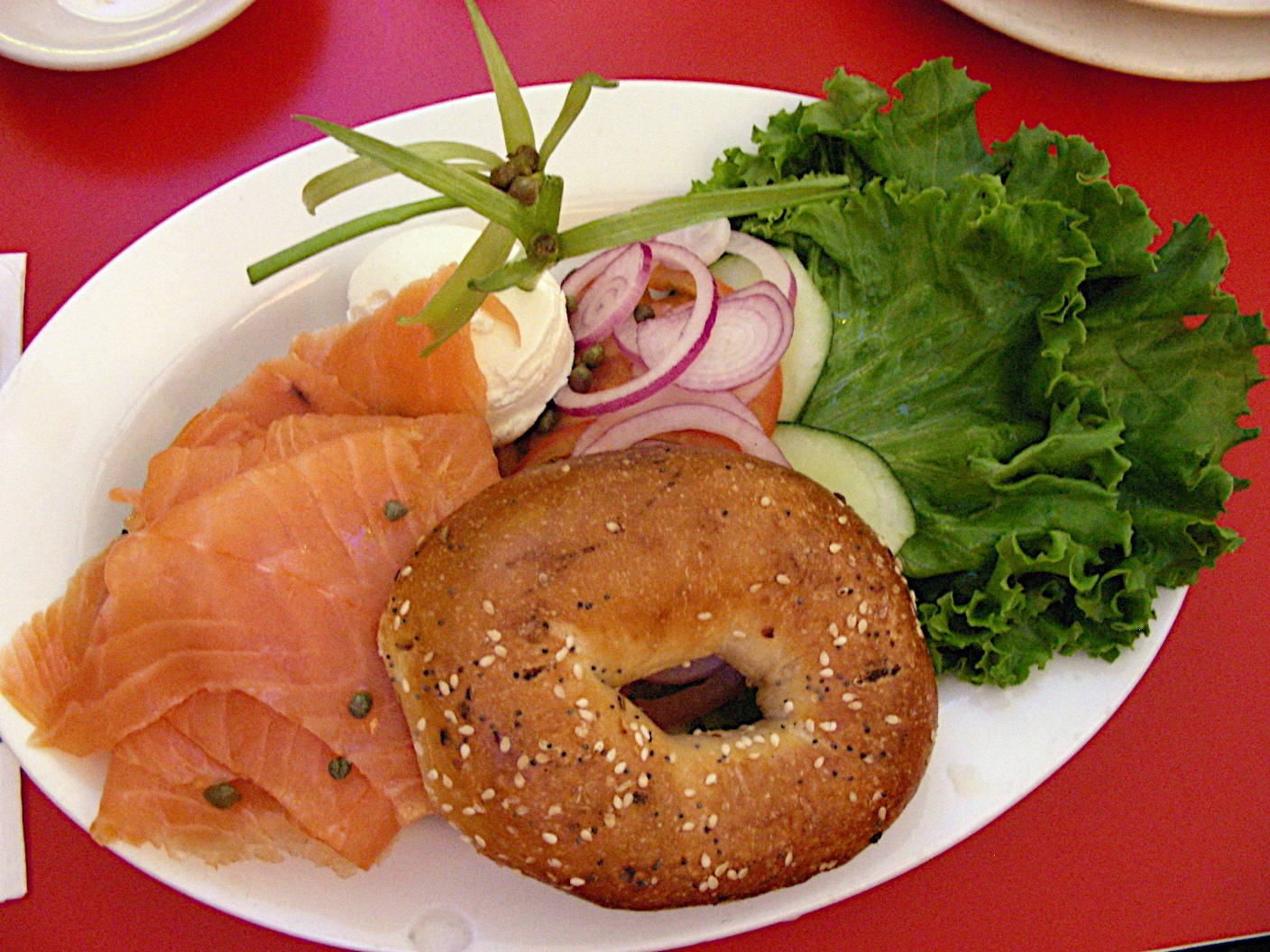
A bagel, lox, and cream cheese sandwich, before assembly

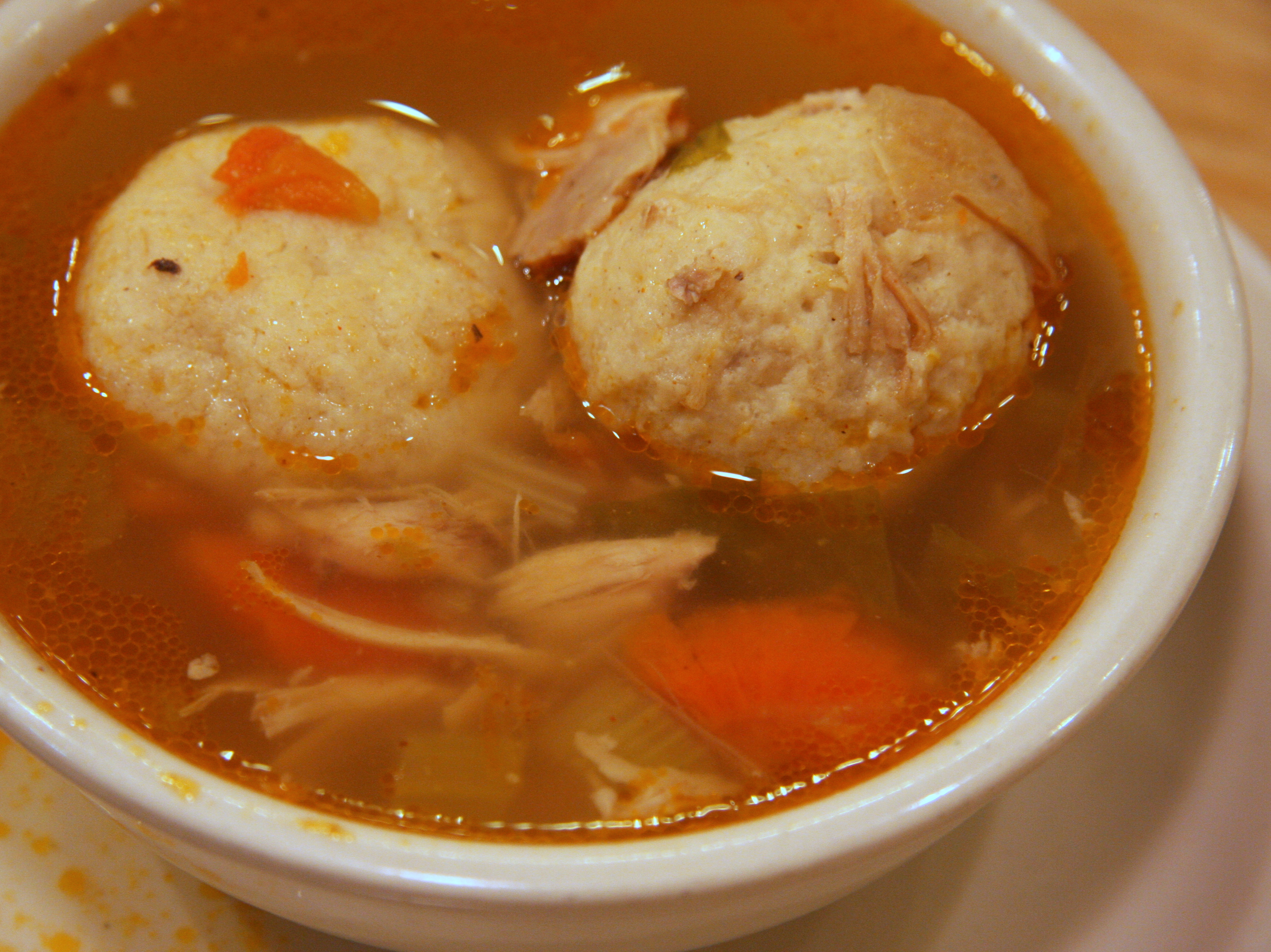
Chicken soup with matzah balls

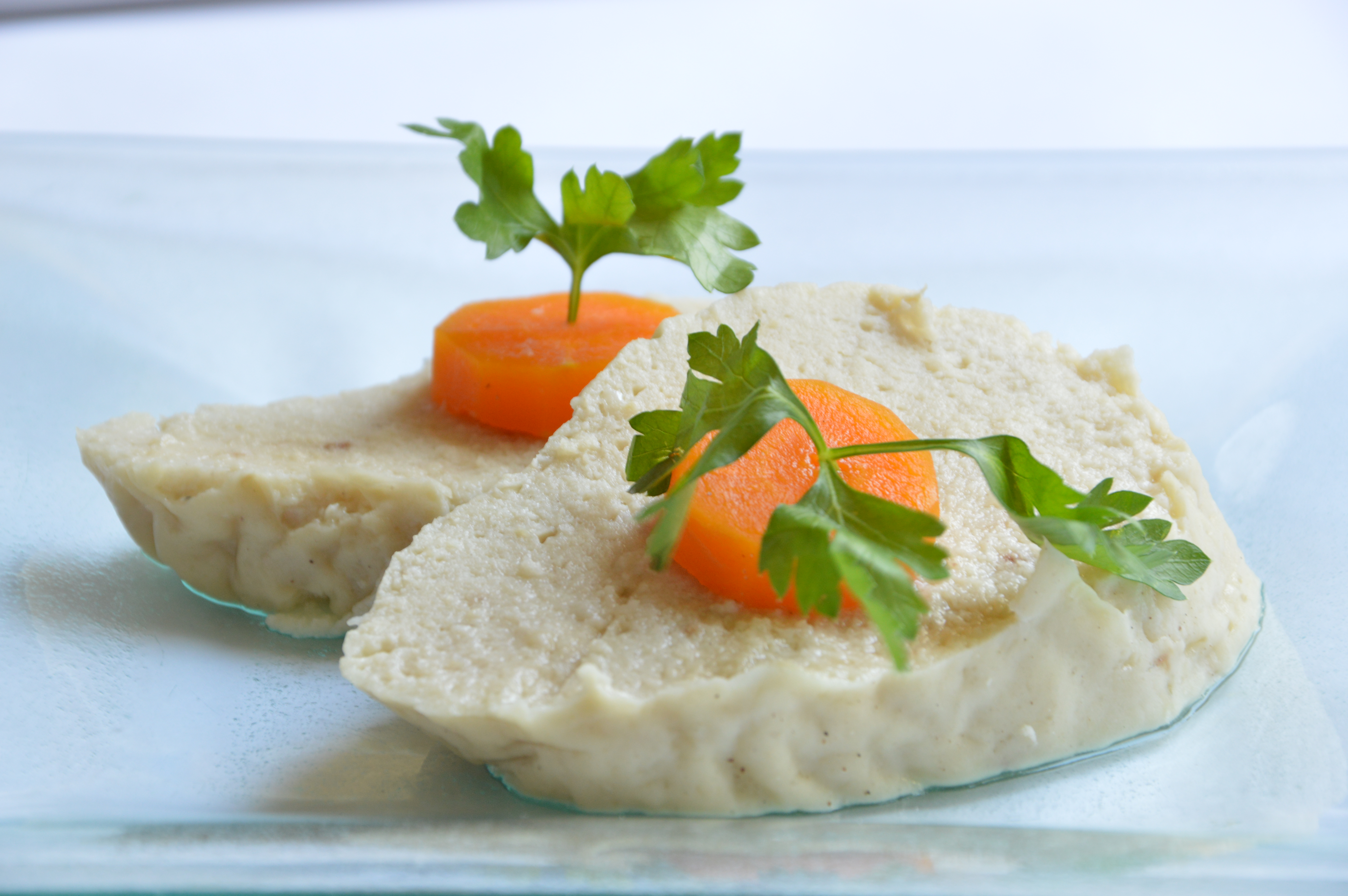
Gefilte fish is made with fish that has been minced and then poached.

Popular dishes in American Jewish cuisine include:

- Bagel – A doughnut-shaped bread roll. The dough is first boiled and then baked, resulting in a dense, chewy interior with a browned exterior.
  - A bagel and cream cheese is a popular pairing.
- Bialy – A bread roll similar to a bagel, but without a hole, and somewhat less chewy as the dough is not boiled before being baked.
- Blintz – A fried crêpe, usually filled with farmer cheese and served with various toppings.
- Brisket – An inexpensive cut of beef that is braised as a pot roast.
- Challah – A light bread made with eggs, used as regular food, and on ritual or holiday occasions.
- Chicken soup – Chicken broth with herbs like parsley, dill, or thyme, and often with egg noodles added.
  - Matzah balls are sometimes added to the soup instead of, or in addition to, noodles.
  - Kreplach are small dumplings that are another common addition to chicken soup.
- Chopped liver – A liver pâté made with hard-boiled eggs, salt, and pepper. Served as a side dish, hence the expression, "What am I, chopped liver?"
- Corned beef – Beef brisket that has been cured with brine and spices and then sliced.
  - Corned beef sandwich – A common use of corned beef.
- Gefilte fish – Ground fish – often a combination of carp, pike, and whitefish – that is mixed with other ingredients, formed into patties or balls, and poached; usually served as an appetizer.
- Kishke – A large, starchy sausage made with grain, vegetables, beef or chicken fat, and spices.
- Knish – A type of savory baked turnover; various fillings are used, such as potatoes or ground beef.
- Kugel – A baked casserole made with egg noodles or potatoes.
- Latke – A pancake made with grated potatoes and other ingredients, fried in oil.
- Lox – A sliced fillet of cured salmon. Belly lox is cured with brine and is therefore rather salty. Nova lox is cold-smoked. Lox is often eaten as a sandwich, on a bagel with cream cheese.
- Mandelbrot – A crunchy cookie, sometimes made with almonds, formed by baking a loaf which is then cut into small slabs and twice-baked.
- Pastrami – Beef brisket that has been cured with brine, rubbed with pepper, garlic, and other spices, smoked, and then sliced. Like corned beef it is usually served as a sandwich.
  - Pastrami on rye – Pastrami on rye bread topped with spicy brown mustard.
- Rugelach – Small baked pastries made by wrapping dough around a filling.
- Whitefish – Smoked freshwater whitefish, either filleted or made into whitefish salad.
American Jewish foods

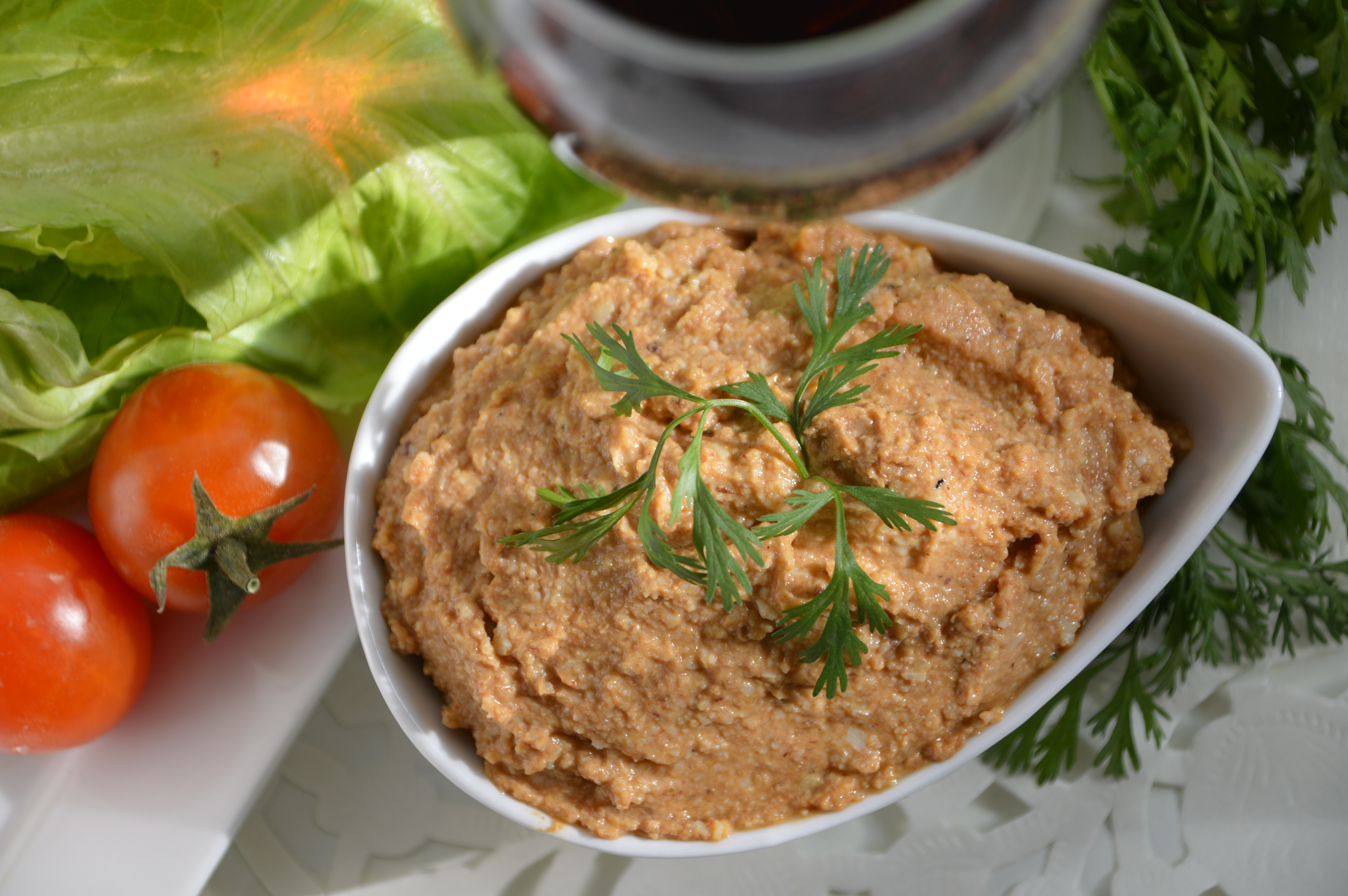
Chopped liver

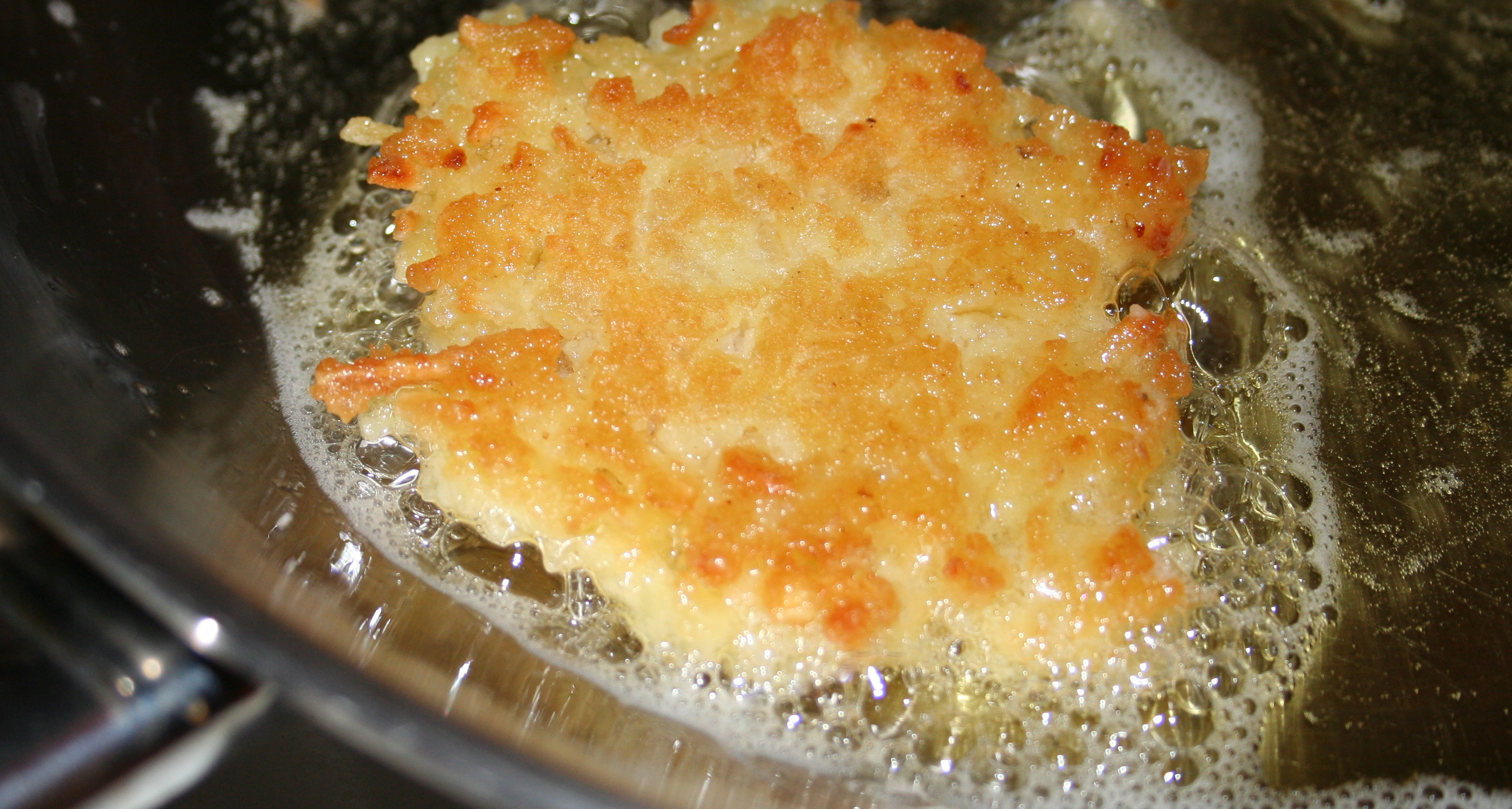
A latke

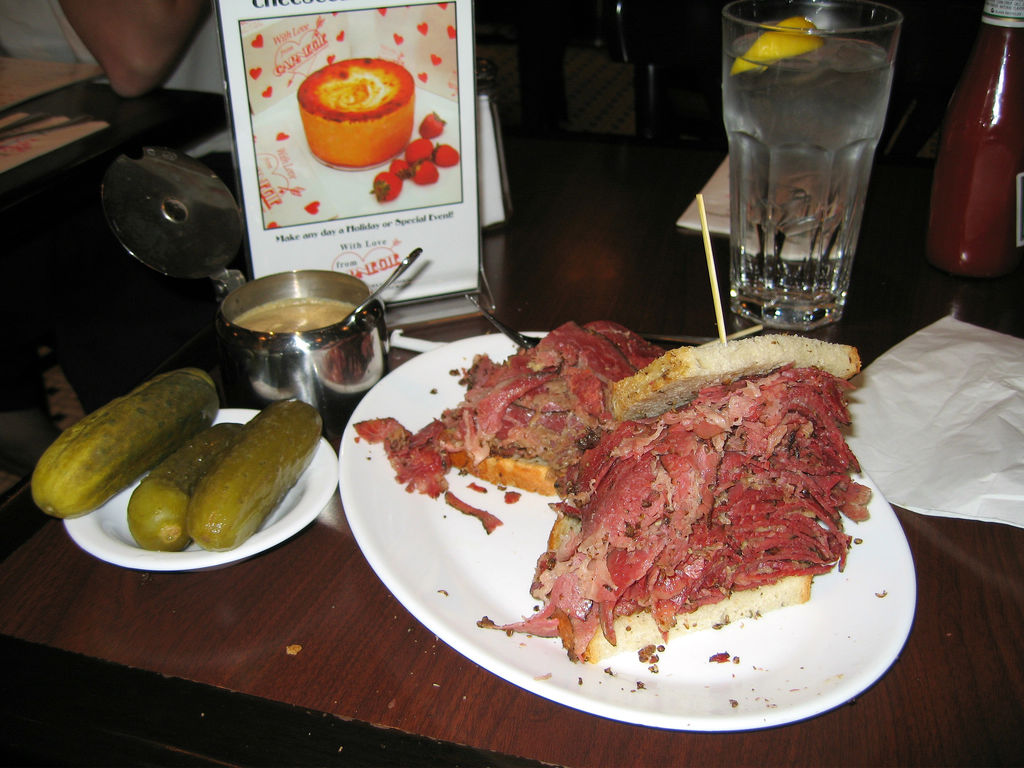
A pastrami on rye with kosher dill pickles and spicy brown mustard

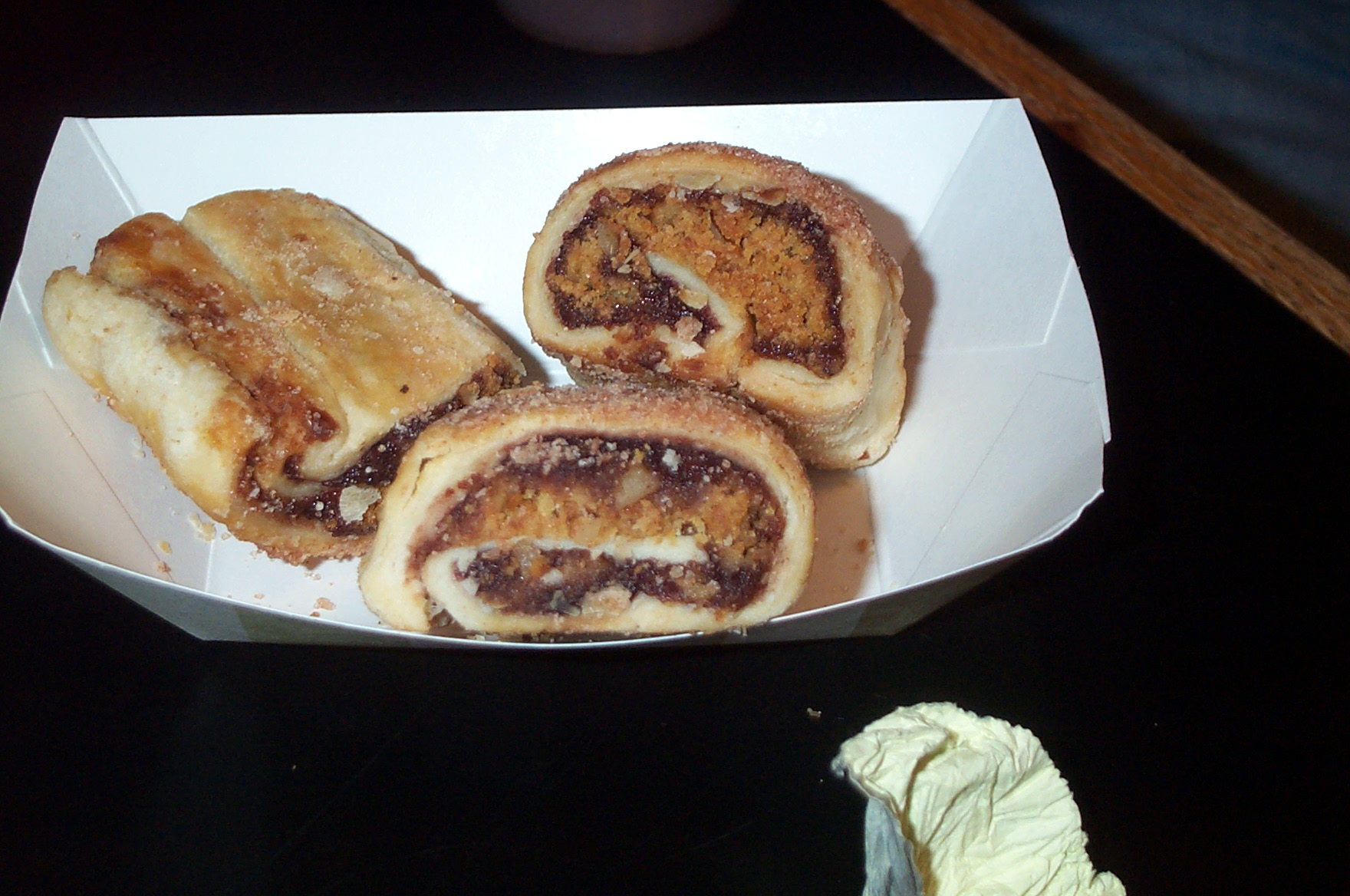
Blackberry rugelach

== Commercial establishments ==
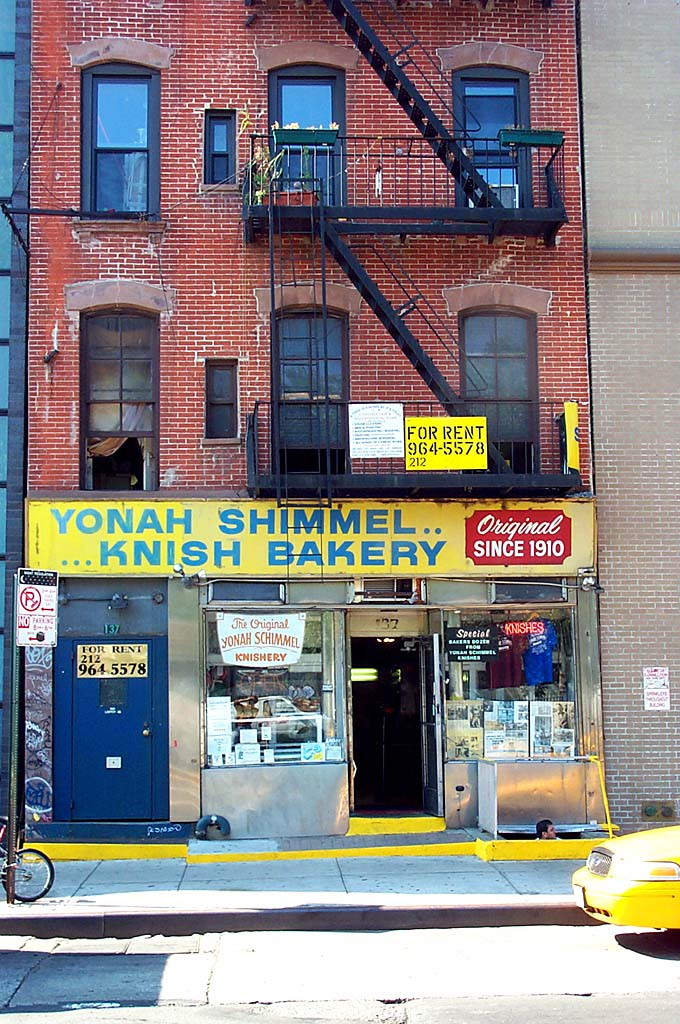
Yonah Shimmel's Knish Bakery on the Lower East Side

Notable American Jewish restaurants, delicatessens, grocery stores, and food and wine companies include:

- Acme Smoked Fish Corp.
- Barney Greengrass
- Brent's Deli
- Canter's
- Carnegie Deli
- Creole Kosher Kitchen
- D.Z. Akin's
- Empire Kosher
- Gertle's Bake Shop
- Hebrew National
- IDT Megabite Cafe
- Jerry's Famous Deli
- Katz's Delicatessen
- Kaufman's Deli
- Kedem Winery
- Kenny & Zuke's Delicatessen
- Langer's Deli
- Lindy's
- Loeb's NY Deli
- Manischewitz
- Mile End Delicatessen
- Murray's Sturgeon Shop
- Ratner's
- Reuben's Restaurant
- Russ & Daughters
- Second Avenue Deli
- Streit's
- Wolfie Cohen's Rascal House
- Yonah Shimmel's Knish Bakery
- Zabar's

== Dining at Chinese restaurants on Christmas ==
The American Jewish custom of eating at Chinese restaurants on Christmas Day or Christmas Eve is a common stereotype portrayed in film and television, but it has a factual basis. The tradition may have arisen from the lack of other open restaurants on Christmas, as well as the close proximity to each other of Jewish and Chinese immigrants in New York City. Another reason is the near-total absence of dairy products in Chinese food, making it easy to order a meat dish that doesn't contain dairy.

== See also ==
- American cuisine
- Jewish cuisine
- Jewish deli
- List of Jewish cuisine dishes
- List of kosher restaurants
