= Bread and Ink Cafe =

Restaurant in Portland, Oregon, U.S.

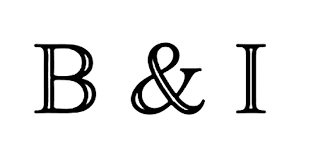

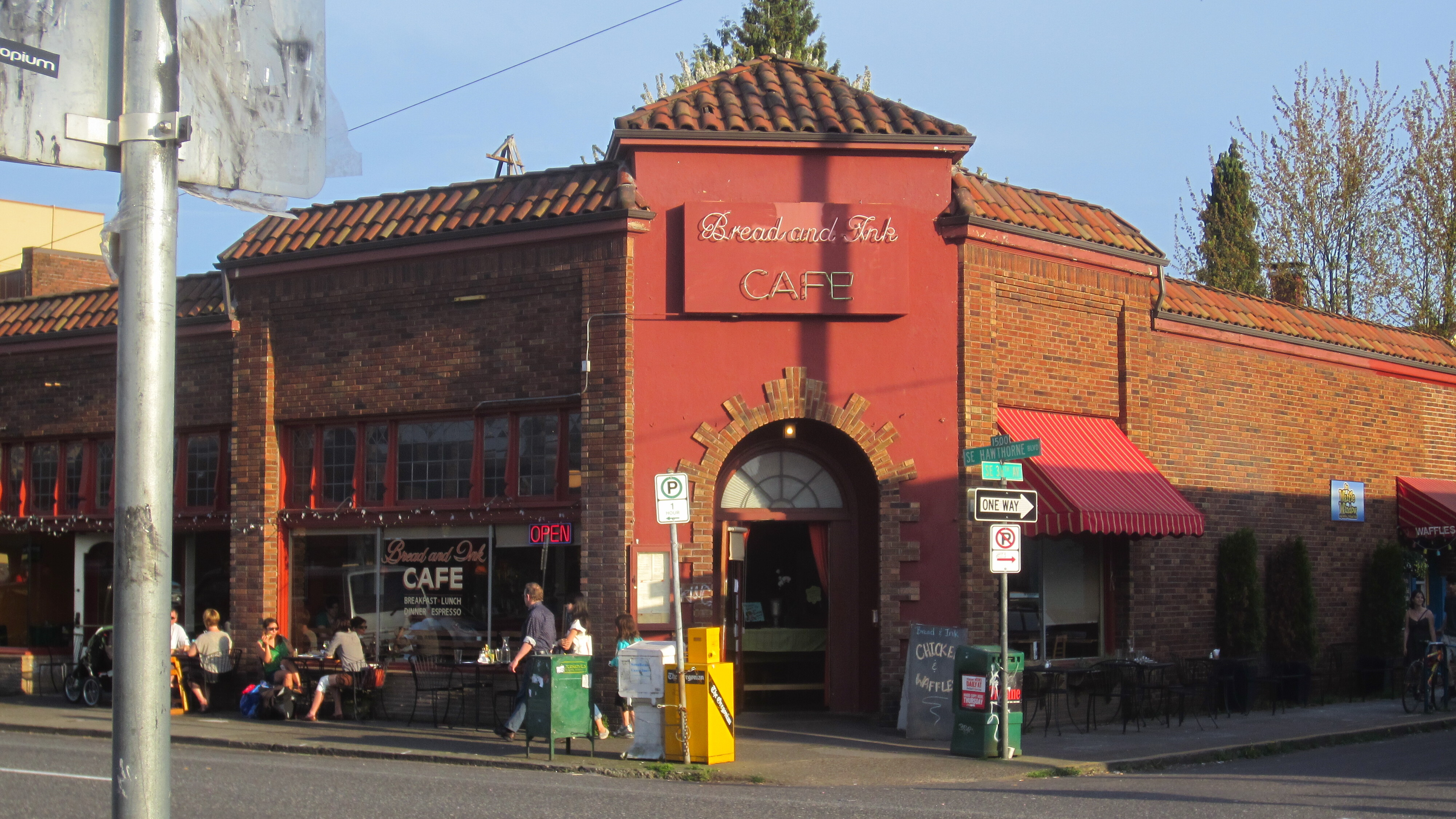
- The restaurant's exterior in 2012
- Interactive map of Bread and Ink Cafe

Restaurant information
- Food type: American
- Location: 3610 Southeast Hawthorne Boulevard, Portland, Multnomah, Oregon, 97214, United States
- Coordinates: 45.5119°N 122.6266°W
- Website: breadandinkcafe.com

Bread and Ink Cafe, or simply Bread and Ink, is a restaurant in Portland, Oregon.

== Description ==
Bread and Ink Cafe is located in southeast Portland's Richmond neighborhood. Jane and Michael Stern have described the restaurant as a "folksy place" with "interesting" wall art and food which "reflects a sophisticated urban palate". The duo said of the interior, "Bread and Ink is a nice place to sit. Tall windows provide diners with a view of the comings-and-goings on Hawthorne; and tables are outfitted with well-cushioned chairs conducive to leisurely meals and relaxed conversation."

The menu includes grilled curried chicken, jerked game hen, and Italian wedding cake. The hamburger, considered a favorite, has a one-third pound patty on an onion bun with aioli, ketchup, mayonnaise, and mustard. Other options include blue, cheddar, or Swiss cheese, bacon, mushrooms, and tomatillo sauce. The breakfast menu includes biscuits and gravy, chicken and waffles, Frisian French toast, and skillet scrambles. On weekends, Eggs Benedict made with smoked pork loin and lox benedict with smoked salmon are available.

== History ==
Chefs Pattie Hill and Gray Wolf opened the restaurant with Bruce Fishback and Sarah Laughlin.

Bread and Ink served a four-course, prix fixe dinner for Thanksgiving in 2014, 2016, and 2017. The restaurant participated in the Portland Mercury's Burger Week in 2021.

== Reception ==
Rating Bread and Ink 3 out of 5 stars, Jane and Michael Stern said the restaurant "has become a trusty old friend to longtime residents" and has "a staff that treats everyone with disarming familiarity". Giselle Smith gave the restaurant 2 out of 4 stars in her 2004 book Best Places Northwest, and John Gottberg and Elizabeth Lopeman gave the restaurant 1.5 out of 4 stars in the 2010 edition of Best Places: Portland. In 2019, Michael Russell of The Oregonian included Bread and Ink in his "ultimate guide to Portland's 40 best brunches".
