= Barney Greengrass =

Deli in New York City

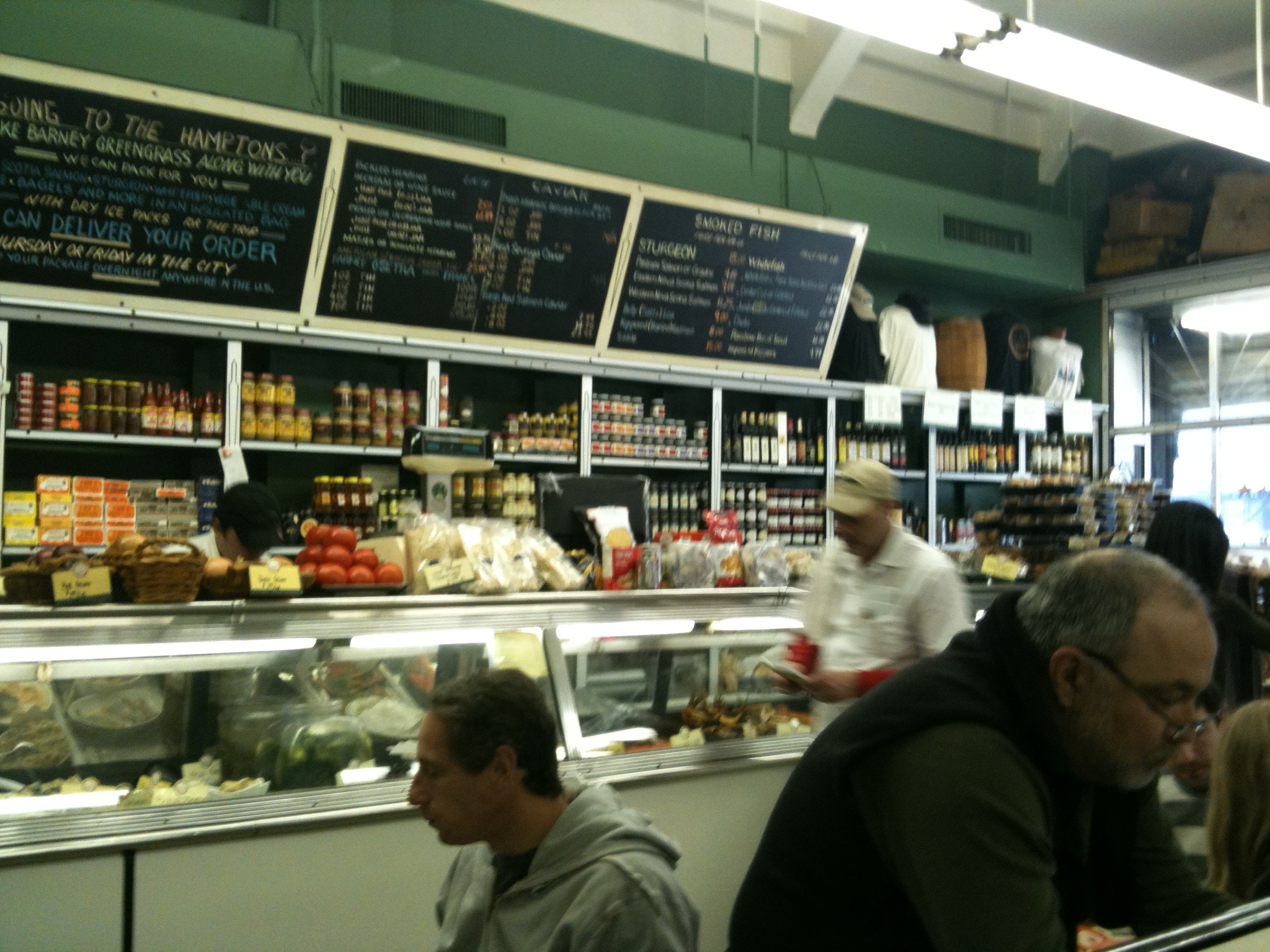
- Interior of Barney Greengrass
- Interactive map of Barney Greengrass

Restaurant information
- Established: 1908; 118 years ago
- Food type: American Jewish
- Location: 541 Amsterdam Avenue (between 86th and 87th Streets), Upper West Side, Manhattan, New York City, Manhattan (UWS), New York, 10024, United States
- Coordinates: 40.787977°N 73.974587°W
- Reservations: N/A
- Website: www.barneygreengrass.com

Barney Greengrass is a restaurant, deli, and appetizing store at 541 Amsterdam Avenue (between West 86th and 87th Streets) on the Upper West Side of Manhattan, New York City, started in 1908. It specializes in smoked fish, more specifically sturgeon, but also carries Nova Scotia salmon, whitefish, and others, and is very popular for brunch.

The establishment won the 2006 James Beard Foundation Award for Excellence. In 2013, Zagat gave it a food rating of 24, third-highest among New York City delis. In 2021, the Financial Times ranked it one of the “50 greatest food stores in the world.” In No Reservations: Around the World on an Empty Stomach, Anthony Bourdain wrote that the store's chopped liver was "the best there is".

== History ==
Barney Greengrass opened a restaurant in 1908 at the corner of West 113th Street and St. Nicholas Avenue in Harlem. It moved to its current location at 86th Street and Amsterdam Avenue in 1929. In 1938, Greengrass was given the nickname "Sturgeon King" by James J. Frawley.

After Greengrass's death, the restaurant was run by his son Marvin (called "Moe") and his wife Shirley. When Moe died in 2001, responsibility passed on to his own son, Gary.

== Beverly Hills ==
In 1995, Barney Greengrass opened an outlet at the Beverly Hills branch of Barneys New York (since closed).

== See also ==
- List of Ashkenazi Jewish restaurants
- List of delicatessens
- List of James Beard America's Classics
