= Arthur Cutler =

Arthur Cutler may refer to:

- Sir Arthur Roden Cutler, Australian diplomat, governor and recipient of the Victoria Cross
- Arthur Cutler (cricketer), New Zealand cricketer
- Arthur Cutler (restaurateur), American restaurateur
