= Acme Smoked Fish Corp. =

American seafood company

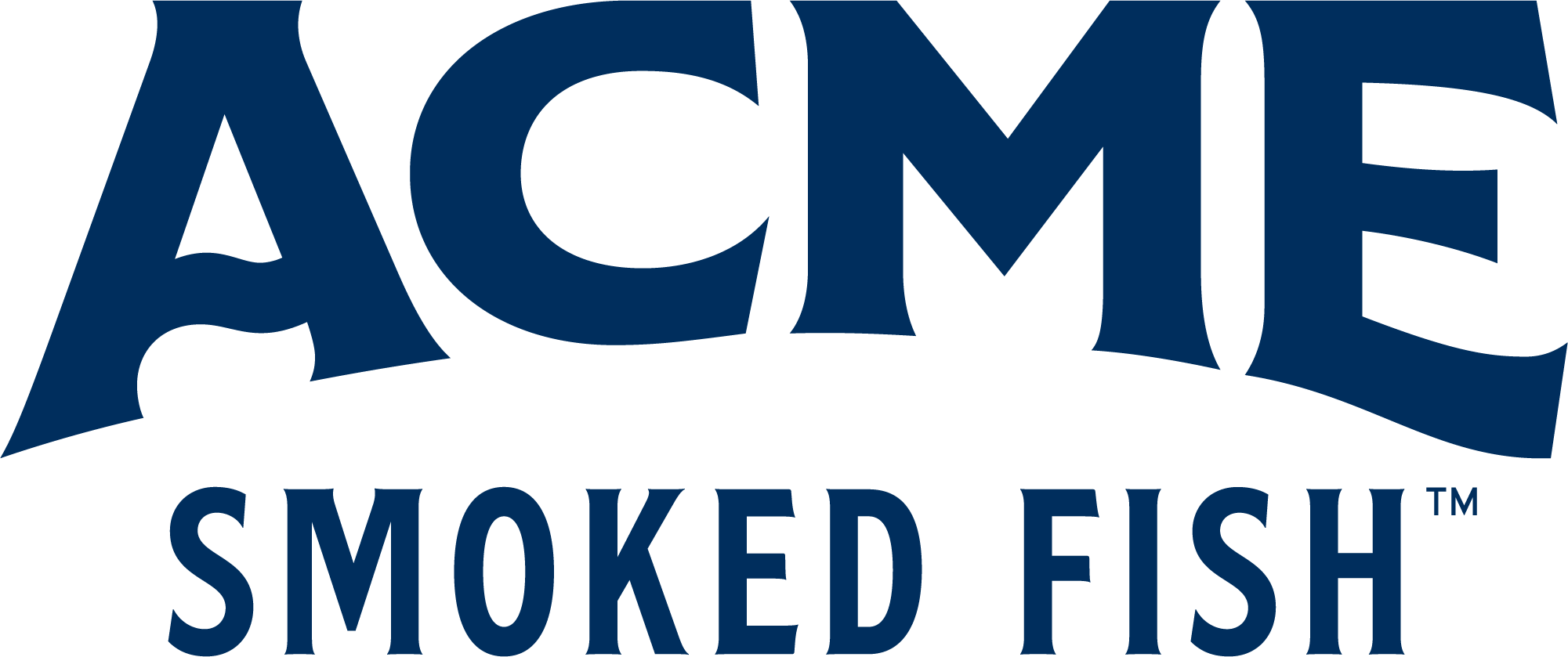
- Industry: Seafood
- Founded: 1906
- Headquarters: Brooklyn, New York, U.S.
- Products: Smoked salmon, smoked fish, pickled herring
- Website: https://www.acmesmokedfish.com/

Acme Smoked Fish Corp. is the largest producer of smoked salmon in North America, and is also a manufacturer and seller of pickled herring and other smoked and cured seafood products. Acme Smoked Fish has US-based facilities located in New York City, Massachusetts, North Carolina, and Florida, as well as international locations in Chile and Denmark. Acme Smoked Fish Corp. is a privately held, family-owned company, that has been headquartered in the Greenpoint neighborhood of Brooklyn since 1954.

== History ==
Harry Brownstein founded what would eventually become Acme Smoked Fish in 1906, shortly after emigrating from Russia. In Brownstein's early days buying and selling smoked fish in Brooklyn, he did so from a horse-drawn wagon throughout several Brooklyn neighborhoods before setting up a brick-and-mortar location in the Brownsville neighborhood during the 1930s. In 1941, Rubin Caslow of Arcee Sales, a prominent smoked fish seller in Brooklyn at the time, joined Harry Brownstein's smoked fish company after marrying Charlotte Brownstein, the daughter of Harry Brownstein. In 1954, Acme Smoked Fish was officially incorporated and began manufacturing in Greenpoint, Brooklyn, the company's current international headquarters.

In 1966, Acme's Brooklyn facility had to be rebuilt after a major fire destroyed the plant. Soon after the reconstruction of the facility the company began its pickled herring division. In 1969, Acme Smoked Fish founder Harry Brownstein died, leaving the company to his sons Joseph and Morton Brownstein and son-in-law Rubin Caslow. In 1975, to accommodate growth and increasing production requirements, Acme purchased the building next door to their Brooklyn facility, bringing the company to occupy a full New York City block.

In 1970 and 1972, respectively, Robert and Eric Caslow joined Acme Smoked Fish as the company's third generation of owner operators. In 1978 Acme Smoked Fish introduced its first commercial line of consumer packaged good smoked salmon and lox products.

Acme Smoked Fish acquired another company for the first time in 2007 with the purchase of Great American Smoked Fish of Pompano Beach, Florida, establishing a new headquarters for Acme Smoked Fish of Florida, LLC, which began as a regional distribution center in 2005. In 2015, Acme opened the largest smoked salmon facility in the United States in Wilmington, North Carolina. Also in 2015, the company opened Acme Chile in Puerto Montt, Chile, making Acme Smoked Fish Corp. multinational for the first time in the company's history.

In 2019, Acme Smoked Fish acquired Spence & Co. Ltd. of Brockton, Massachusetts. In 2020, Acme made another acquisition in the form of a majority stake in Norlax A/S, a producer of smoked fish products based in Outrup, Denmark. Currently, Acme Smoked Fish is managed by its fourth generation of owner operators, Adam Caslow, David Caslow, and Emily Caslow.

== In popular culture ==
Acme Smoked Fish partnered with New York City-based Zucker's Bagels in 2018 in an attempt to make the world's largest bagel, cream cheese, and smoked salmon sandwich. The final product weighed 213 pounds. The attempt was featured on Inside Edition, but was never certified as a world record by Guinness World Records.
