= Bagel and cream cheese =

Common food pairing in American cuisine

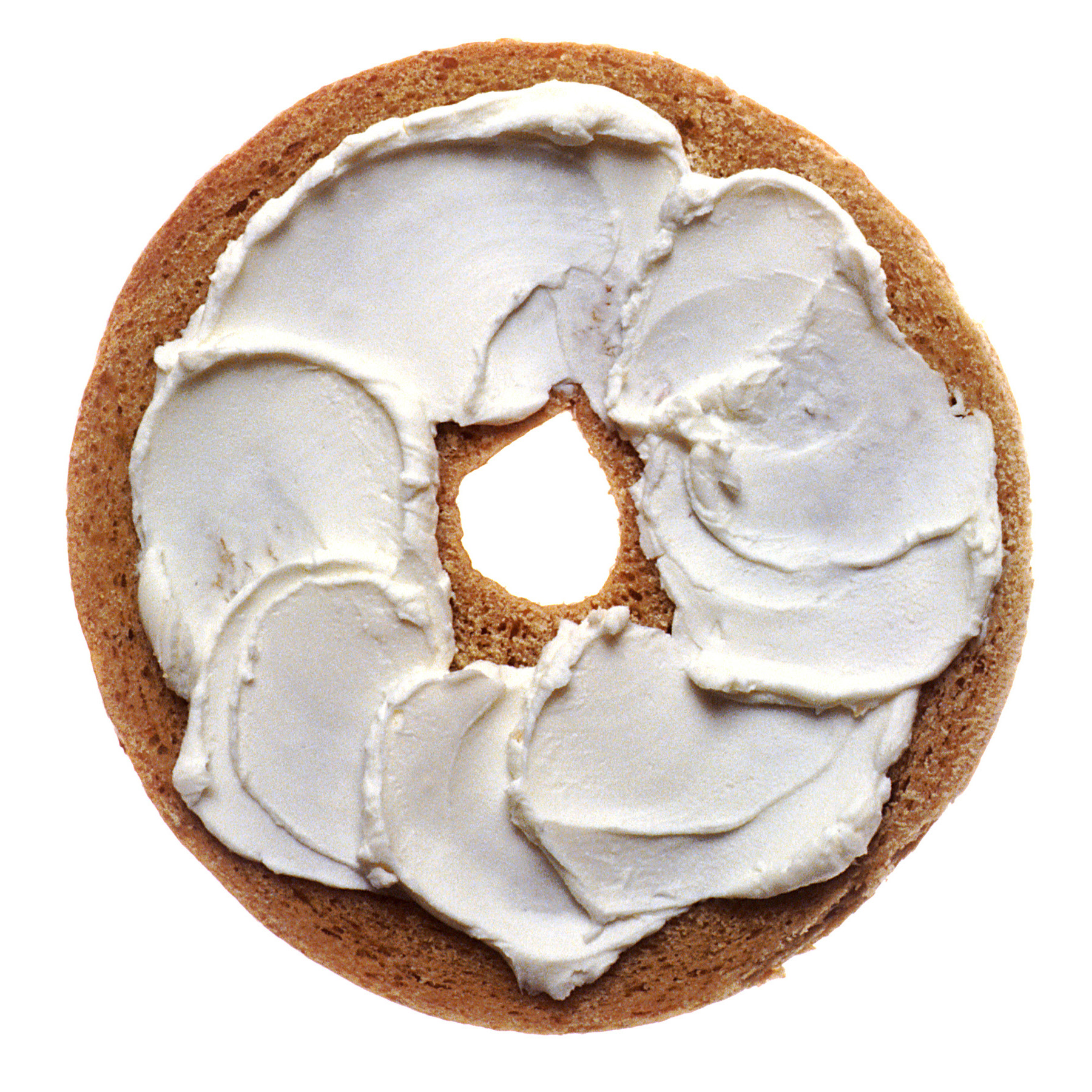

A bagel and cream cheese (also known as bagel with cream cheese) is a food pairing that consists, in its basic form, of a sliced bagel spread with cream cheese. Bagels with cream cheese are most traditionally served open-faced (although bagel sandwiches are now at least as common) and spread with cream cheese and other toppings.

Bagels with cream cheese are common in North American cuisine, especially in American Jewish cuisine and the cuisine of New York City. They became popular among the general population beyond Jewish communities in the 1980s. Bagels served closed as a sandwich also became increasingly popular at that time for their portability, and today the bagel sandwich may be the most common form, outside of the Jewish deli tradition. The basic bagel with cream cheese serves as the base for other items such as the lox as in "lox and schmear" ("smear"), a staple of delicatessens in the New York City and Philadelphia areas and across the U.S.

Some non-traditional ingredients take well to bagel sandwiches, such as eggs and breakfast meats, cold cuts and sliced cheese while several traditional Jewish toppings for bagel halves do not work well when sandwiched, including the popular whitefish salad, pickled herring or chopped liver, for the simple mechanical reason that soft toppings easily squirt out the sides when the bagel is bitten.

== American cuisine ==
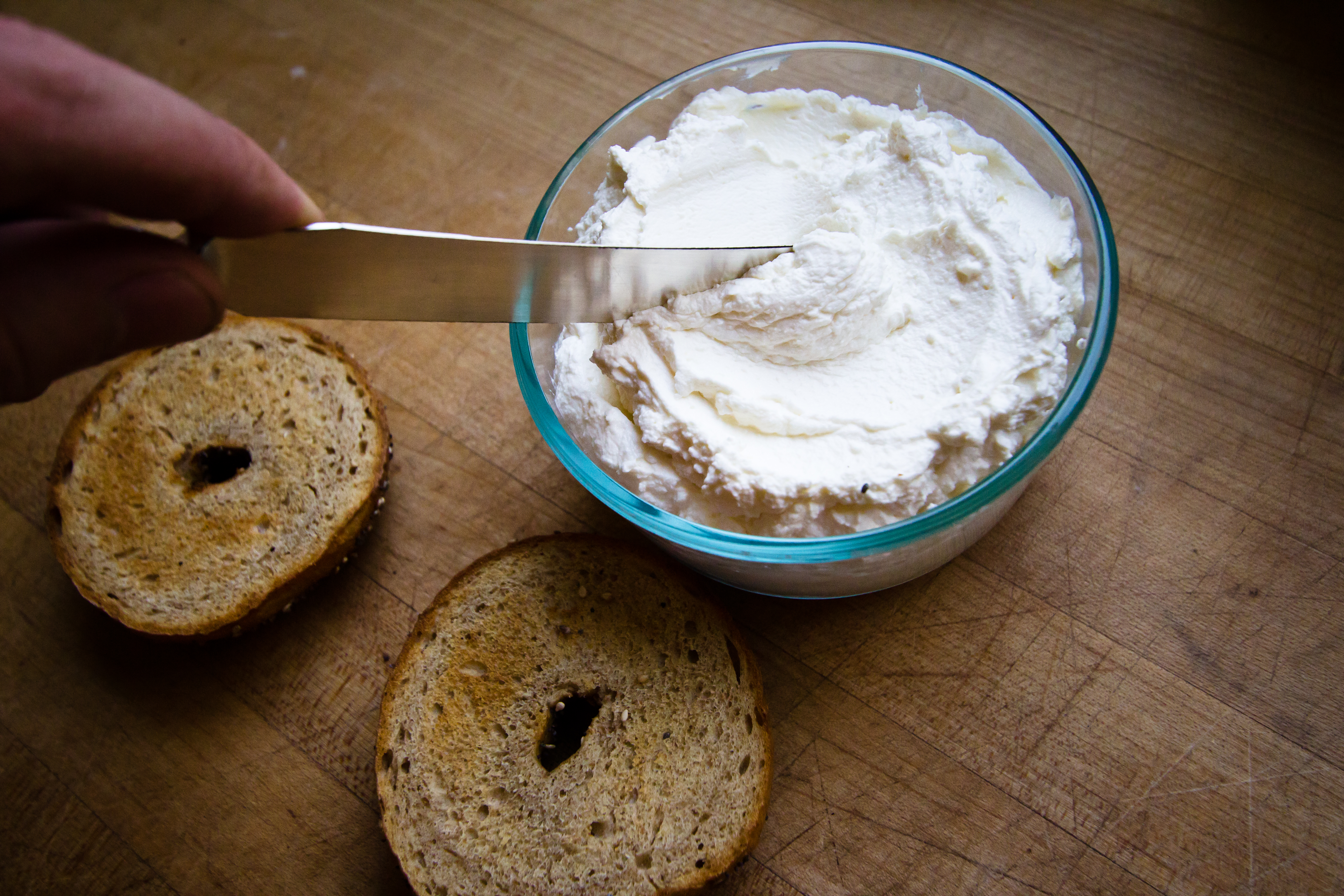
A toasted bagel with cream cheese

A bagel with cream cheese is common in American cuisine, particularly in New York City. It is often eaten for breakfast; with smoked salmon or lox added, it is sometimes served for brunch as well. Around 1900 in New York City, a popular combination consisted of a bagel topped with lox, cream cheese, capers, tomato, and red onion.

The combination of a bagel with cream cheese has been promoted to American consumers in the past by American food manufacturers and publishers. In the early 1950s, Kraft Foods launched an "aggressive advertising campaign" that depicted Philadelphia-brand cream cheese with bagels. In 1977, Better Homes and Family Circle magazines published a bagel and cream cheese recipe booklet that was distributed in the magazines and also placed in supermarket dairy cases.

=== American Jewish cuisine ===
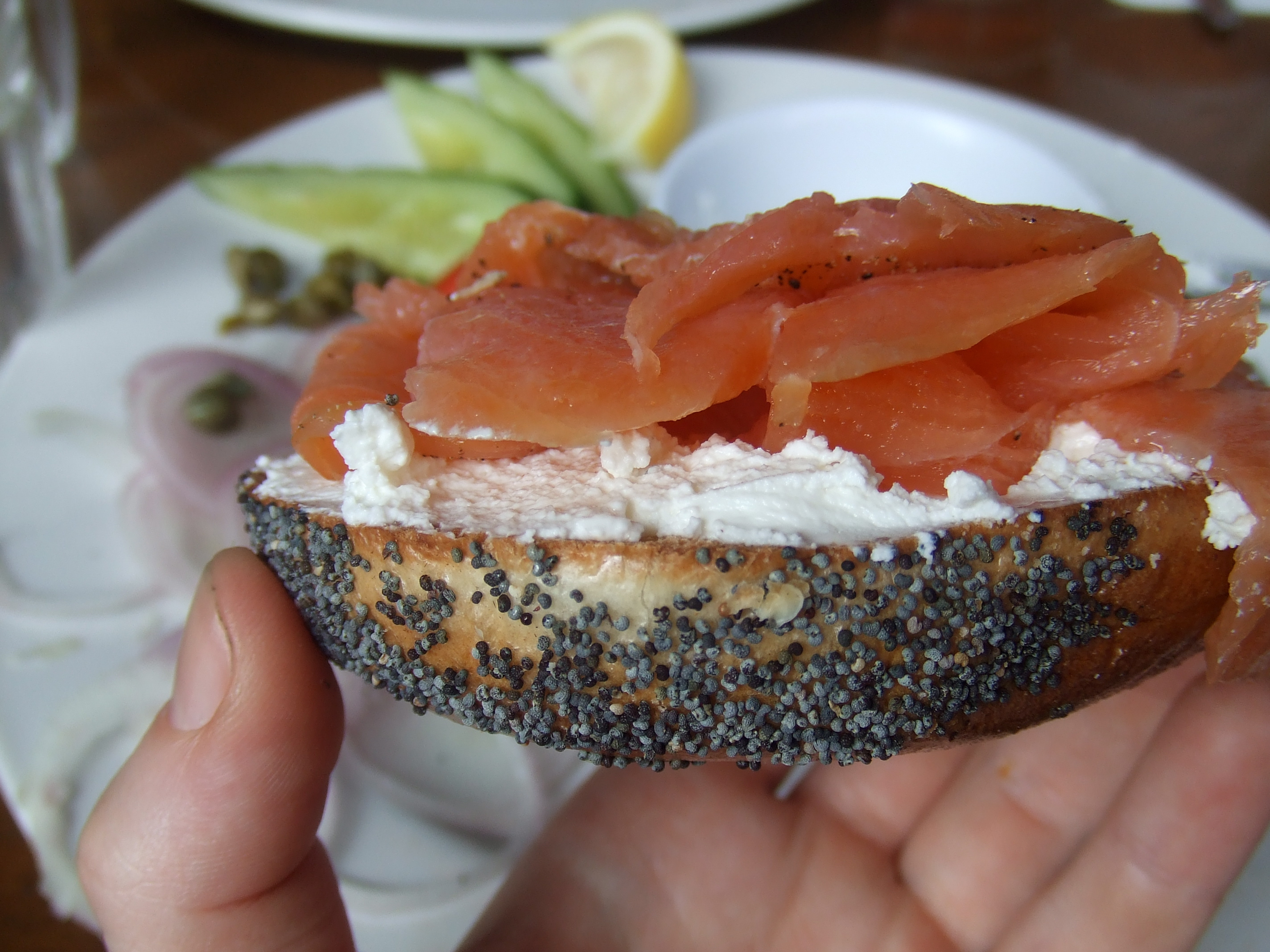
A "lox and a schmear" bagel is a sliced bagel with cream cheese and lox

In American Jewish cuisine, cream cheese toppings (colloquially called "schmear") of bagels have particular names. For example, a bagel covered with spread cream cheese is sometimes called a "whole schmear" bagel. A "slab" is a bagel topped with an unspread slab of cream cheese. A "lox and a schmear" is a bagel with cream cheese and lox or smoked salmon. Tomato, red onion, capers and chopped hard-boiled egg are often added. These terms are used at some delicatessens in New York City, particularly at Jewish delicatessens and older, more traditional delicatessens.

The lox and schmear likely originated in New York City around the time of the turn of the 20th century, when street vendors in the city sold salt-cured belly lox from pushcarts. A high amount of salt in the fish necessitated the addition of bread and cheese to offset the lox's saltiness. It was reported by U.S. newspapers in the early 1940s that bagels and lox were sold by delicatessens in New York City as a "Sunday morning treat", and in the early 1950s, bagels and cream cheese combination were very popular in the United States, having permeated American culture. (Note: "The next stop for the bagel: Broadway. Its break into stardom came in the 1950s. By that time, the cream-cheese bagel was close to supplanting the traditional, Saturday-morning ham, eggs, and toast in America. It had saturated the culture.")

== Mass production ==
Both bagels and cream cheese are mass-produced foods in the United States.

In 2003, Kraft Foods began purveying a mass-produced convenience food product named Philadelphia To Go Bagel & Cream Cheese, which consisted of a combined package of two bagels and cream cheese.

== In popular culture ==
Bagels and cream cheese were provided to theater patrons by the cast of Bagels and Yox, a 1951 American-Yiddish Broadway revue, during the intermission period of the show. The revue ran at the Holiday Theatre in New York City from September 1951 to February 1952. A 1951 review of Bagels and Yox published in Time magazine helped to popularize bagels to American consumers throughout the country.

"Bagel and Lox" is a humorous song about the virtues of the bagel, lox, and cream cheese sandwich. It was written by Sid Tepper and Roy C. Bennett. It has been recorded by several different artists, including Eddie "Rochester" Anderson and, more recently, Rob Schneider, Joan Jaffe, and Oleg Frish. The lyrics to the chorus are:

Bagel and lox with the cheese in the middle,
Bagel and lox let it toast on the griddle,
Bagel and lox with the cheese in the middle,
And a slice of onion on the side.

== See also ==
- Appetizing store
- Bagel toast
- Cheese and crackers
- Cheese on toast
- Welsh rarebit
- List of bread dishes
- List of cheese dishes
- Pizza bagel
