= Corned beef sandwich =

Type of meat sandwich

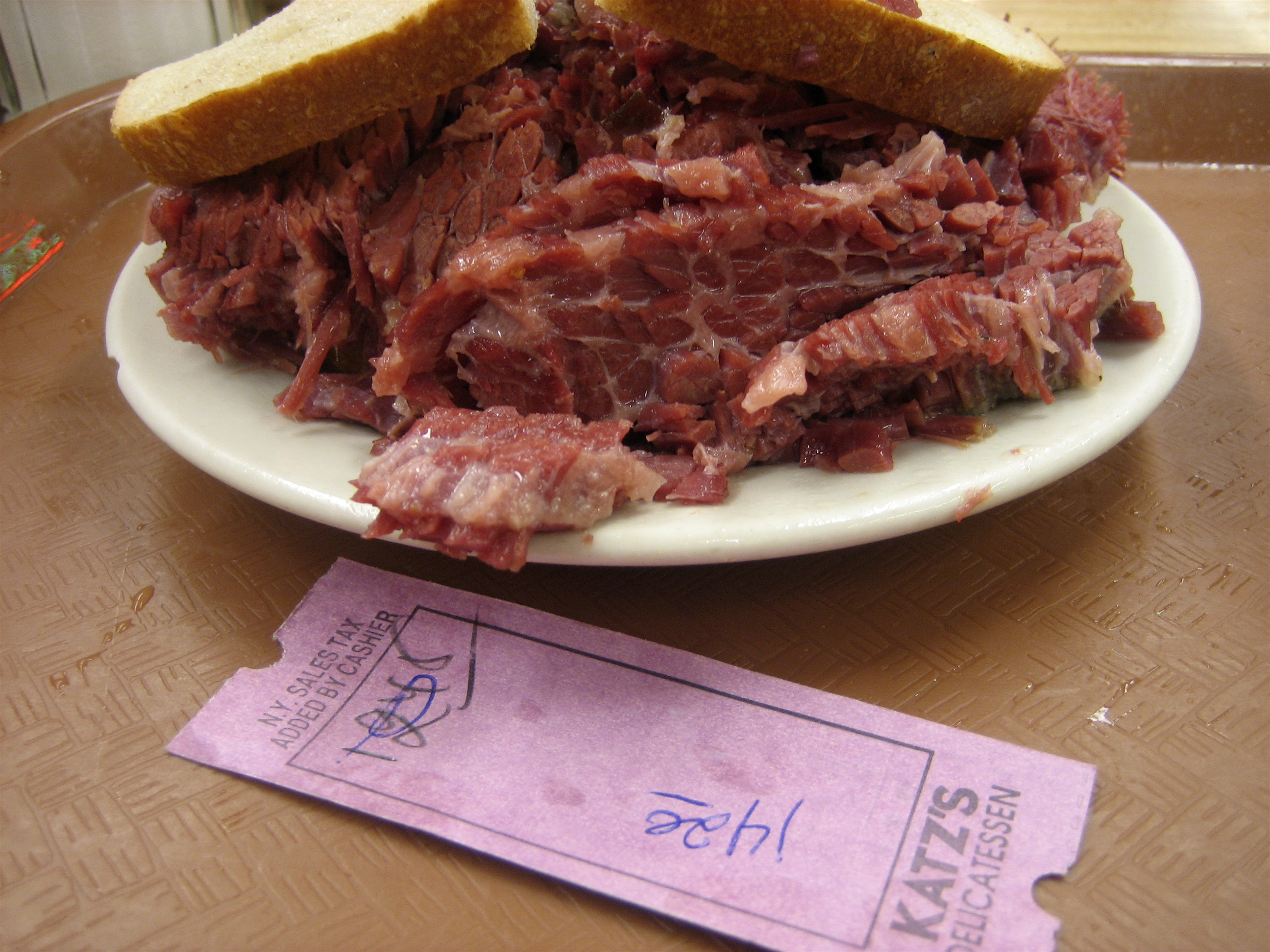
- Alternative names: Corned beef on rye
- Type: Sandwich
- Region or state: United States
- Created by: Ashkenazi Jews
- Main ingredients: Bread, corned beef, Jewish deli mustard, pickles
- Variations: Reuben sandwich

A corned beef sandwich is a Jewish deli sandwich filled with corned beef, traditionally served with mustard on rye bread with a pickle on the side.

== Variations ==
Another variant more common in the United States has sauerkraut, Swiss cheese, and Russian dressing on rye bread grilled and served hot is known as a Reuben sandwich.

In Hong Kong Cha chaan teng cuisine, the corned beef sandwich refers to a variation made with bully beef: the canned beef is broken into minces and mixed with beaten eggs, and the mixture is fried into either a patty similar to egg foo young, or a hash of egg and beef pieces; either which are then sandwiched between bread slices.

A contraband corned beef sandwich on rye bread brought aboard the Gemini 3 spacecraft by John Young resulted in a minor controversy, for the risk posed to the craft and crew by floating crumbs and lingering odors.

== See also ==
- American Jewish cuisine
- List of sandwiches
- Roast beef sandwich
