= Appetizing store =

Type of retail establishment

Russ & Daughters, an appetizing store in New York's Lower East Side

An appetizing store, typically in reference to Jewish cuisine in New York City, particularly Ashkenazi Jewish cuisine, is a store that sells "food that generally goes with bagels", although appetizings can also be served with a variety of breads. Appetizings include smoked and pickled fish and fish spreads, pickled vegetables, cream cheese spreads, and other cheeses.

Most appetizing stores were opened in the late 1800s and the early 1900s. In 1930, there were 500 such stores in New York City; by 2015, there were fewer than ten. The concept started to experience a revitalization in the 2010s with the opening of new stores in Toronto, Philadelphia, and Brooklyn.

== Term ==
The word "appetizing" is sometimes shortened to "appy" and is used for the stores and the foods they sell. The term is used typically among American Jews, especially those in the New York City area in neighborhoods with traditionally large Jewish populations. Saveur traced the term back to food similar to "the cold appetizers that would have started a meal back home in Eastern Europe", although scholars Hasia Diner, Eve Jochnowitz and Norma Joseph say the foods were American foods and others, such as lox, that would have been new to immigrants from Eastern Europe.

The New York Times claimed in 2004 that the term was not used outside of New York City, but as of 2014, this was no longer true, with Toronto's Schmaltz Appetizing a notable example. While Schmaltz Appetizing is the only restaurant in Toronto to use the term in its name, it is not the only such establishment; United Bakers Dairy Restaurant is a venerable and longstanding institution, predating Schmaltz by decades – United Bakers celebrated its hundredth anniversary in 2012, while Schmaltz opened its doors in 2014.

== Foods ==
The stores sell food that Thrillist describes as "food that generally goes with bagels", although Milton Glaser and Jerome Snyder wrote that appetizings might be served with a variety of breads and rolls, including bialys, challah, corn rye bread, Jewish rye, onion rolls, Russian health bread, and seeded hard rolls. The Village Voice described appetizing as "the many pickled, smoked, cured, and cultured edibles served alongside bagels and bialys".

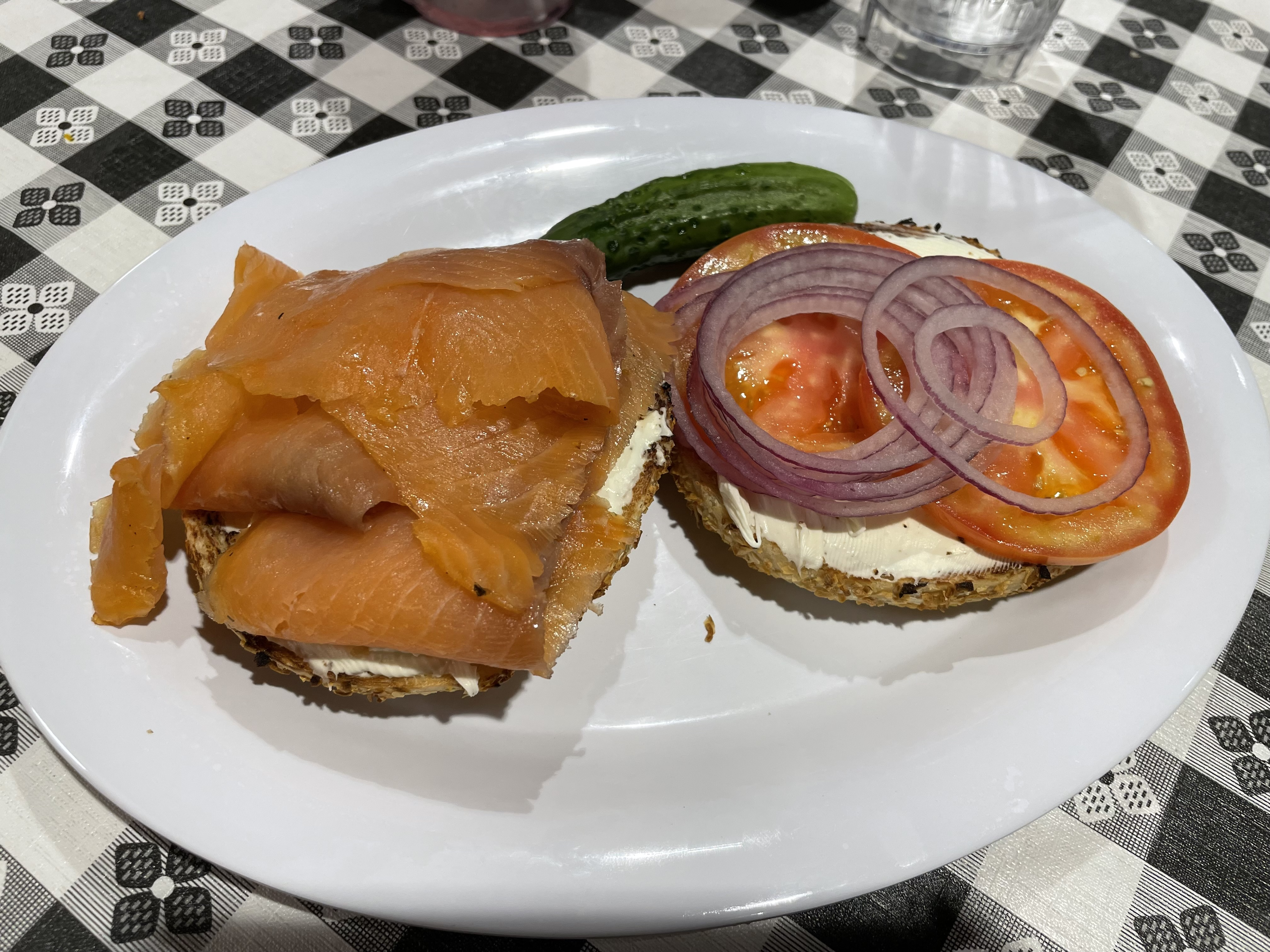
A bagel with lox, cream cheese, and other items, all of which are commonly found in appetizing stores.

Appetizing includes both dairy and "parve" (neither dairy nor meat) food items such as lox (traditionally, salt cured salmon), nova (cold smoked salmon), sable, whitefish, pickled vegetables, along with candies, nuts, and dried fruit. According to a 1968 New York Magazine article, the foods are typically served for Sunday brunch. Jewish kashrut dietary laws specify that meat and dairy products cannot be eaten together or sold in the same places.

== Stores ==
The stores are different from delicatessens in that an appetizing store is a place that sells fish and dairy products but no meat, whereas a kosher delicatessen sells meats but no dairy. Thrillist called them "the deli's other half".

In 1930, there were 500 appetizing stores in New York City, and a similar number in 1950. The majority were opened in the late 1800s and early 1900s. In the 1950s and 1960s, the stores started to close as the owners' children pursued other careers and supermarkets started carrying Jewish specialties. By 2015, there were fewer than 10 remaining. Shelsky's in Cobble Hill was the first appetizing store to open in Brooklyn in 60 years when it opened in 2011. In 2014, an appetizing store opened in Toronto. In 2021, a shop modeled on the concept opened in South Philadelphia's Italian Market; a second location opened in Rittenhouse Square in 2025.

In the 2020s, new businesses drawing on the appetizing-store tradition opened outside New York, including shops in Philadelphia, Los Angeles, and Chicago. The High Holidays, particularly food prepared in advance to break the Yom Kippur fast, remained an important seasonal market.

== Notable establishments ==
- Barney Greengrass
- Murray's Sturgeon Shop
- Russ & Daughters
- Zabar's

== See also ==
- Bagel and cream cheese
- Kosher restaurant
- Jewish dairy restaurant
- Cuisine of New York City
