= Murray's Sturgeon Shop =

Appetizing store in New York

Coordinates: 40.79063°N 73.97504°W

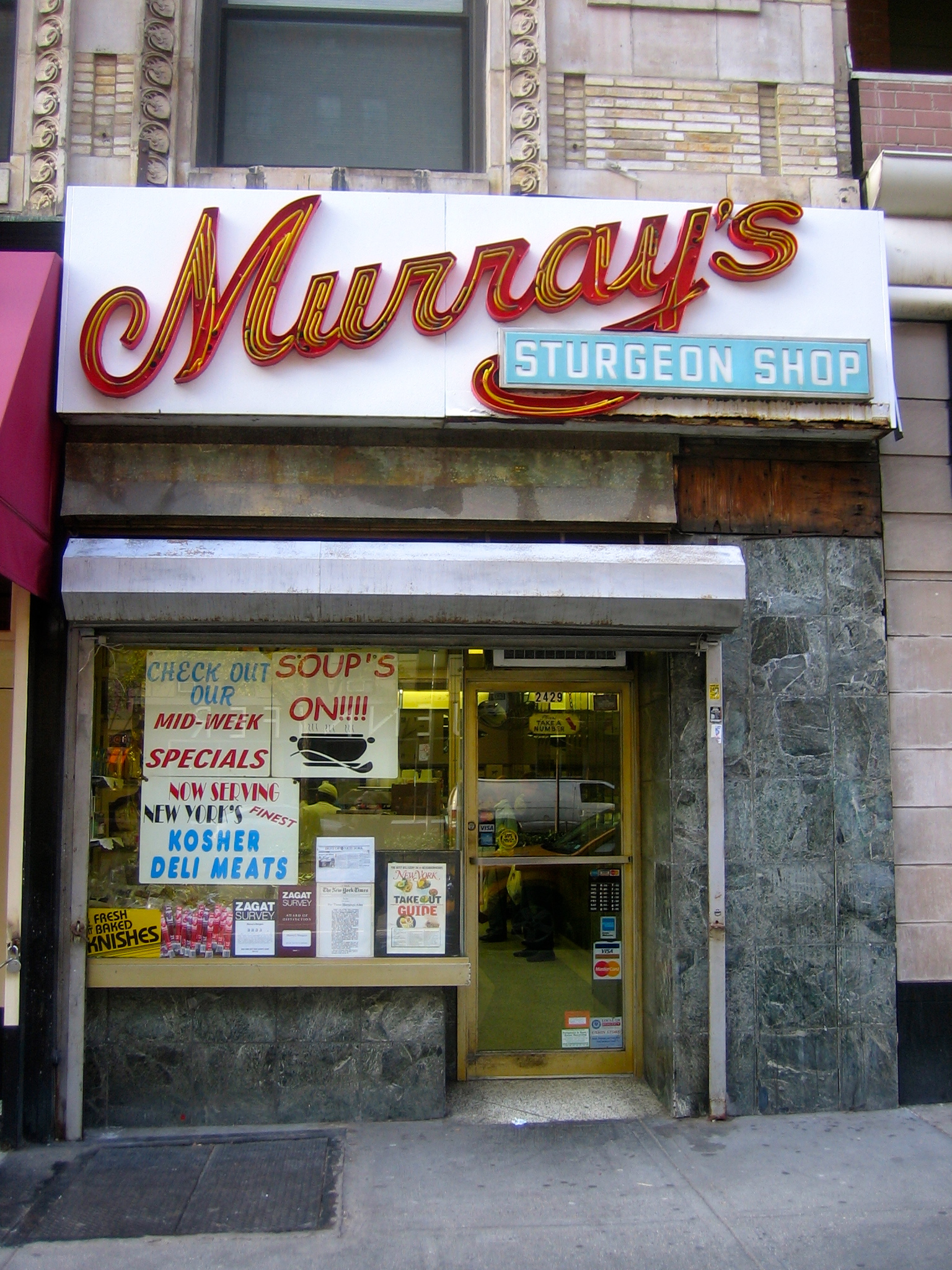
- Interactive map of Murray's Sturgeon Shop

Restaurant information
- Established: 1945
- Location: New York City, New York, United States

Murray's Sturgeon Shop is an appetizing store and neighborhood fixture in Manhattan's Upper West Side. It is located on Broadway between 89th Street and 90th Street.

== History ==
The shop was founded by Murray Bernstein in 1945. A few years later, his brother, Sam, became a co-owner. The Bernsteins were born in Poland and immigrated to New York in the 1920s to escape antisemitism.

The store specializes in smoked fish, especially sturgeon, and caviar. In 1964, The New York Times described it as "one of the busiest places on Broadway" and praised its products as "first quality". The store ships their fish all over the world, and in 1980 Murray's appetizers were being sold at the Neiman Marcus Epicure Shop in White Plains, New York.

Show business personalities Sammy Cahn and Zero Mostel were regulars at the shop.

In 1974, the shop was sold to restaurateur Artie Cutler. Artie took in a partner, Harold "Heshy" Berliner, in 1979. They sold the business to Ira Goller in 1990. Goller continued to own and operate the store 34 years later in 2024 and prides himself on maintaining continuity with its origins.

Sam Bernstein died in 1977 and Murray Bernstein died in 2000.

== See also ==
- List of delicatessens
