= Gertel's Bake Shop =

Kosher bakery in New York City

Coordinates: 40.7157°N 73.9900°W

Gertel's Bakery was a kosher bake shop on New York's Lower East Side. Located at 53 Hester Street, Gertel's Bakery operated from 1914 until the retail store closed on June 21, 2007. It merged with Delancey Bakery and its successor operates as Gertel's Uptown, 101 Steuben Street, Brooklyn, NY, providing wholesale business only.
