= Arthur Cutler (restaurateur) =

American restaurateur

- Born: Brooklyn, New York, U.S.
- Died: June 18, 1997; Great Neck, New York, U.S.
- Education: Columbia College (BA)
- Occupation: Restaurateur

Arthur J. "Artie" Cutler (died June 18, 1997) was an American restaurateur known for founding a number of popular New York City restaurants known for their "eclectic tastes and unlikely sites," according to The New York Times.

== Biography ==
Cutler was born in Brooklyn and grew up in New Hyde Park, New York. His family was in the food business: his father owned a grocery store and a diner, and his grandfather owned a herring stand. He graduated from Columbia University in 1965. He worked his way through college slicing salmon at smoked fish counters.

He was working at an appetizing store in Brighton Beach in 1974 when he heard that Murray's Sturgeon Shop was up for sale. He borrowed money from his mother-in-law and purchased the store from Murray Berstein, the eponymous owner.

In 1990, Cutler opened Carmine's, a family-style Italian restaurant on West 90th Street on Manhattan's Upper West Side, which became an instant success and has six branches across the United States and The Bahamas as of 2022. He named the restaurant after harness driver Carmine Abbatiello. He also opened Ollie's Noodle Shop and Grille, a Chinese restaurant featuring noodles and roast meats, a Mexican Restaurant called Gabriela's, and Virgil's Real BBQ in Times Square. He also owned Docks Oyster Bar on Third Avenue.

Drew Nieporent called Cutler "a quiet genius" in the restaurant business.

His family opened Artie's Delicatessen in 1999 in honor of him after his unexpected death on June 18, 1997, of heart attack. The location closed in 2017.
