= Lox =

Brined salmon

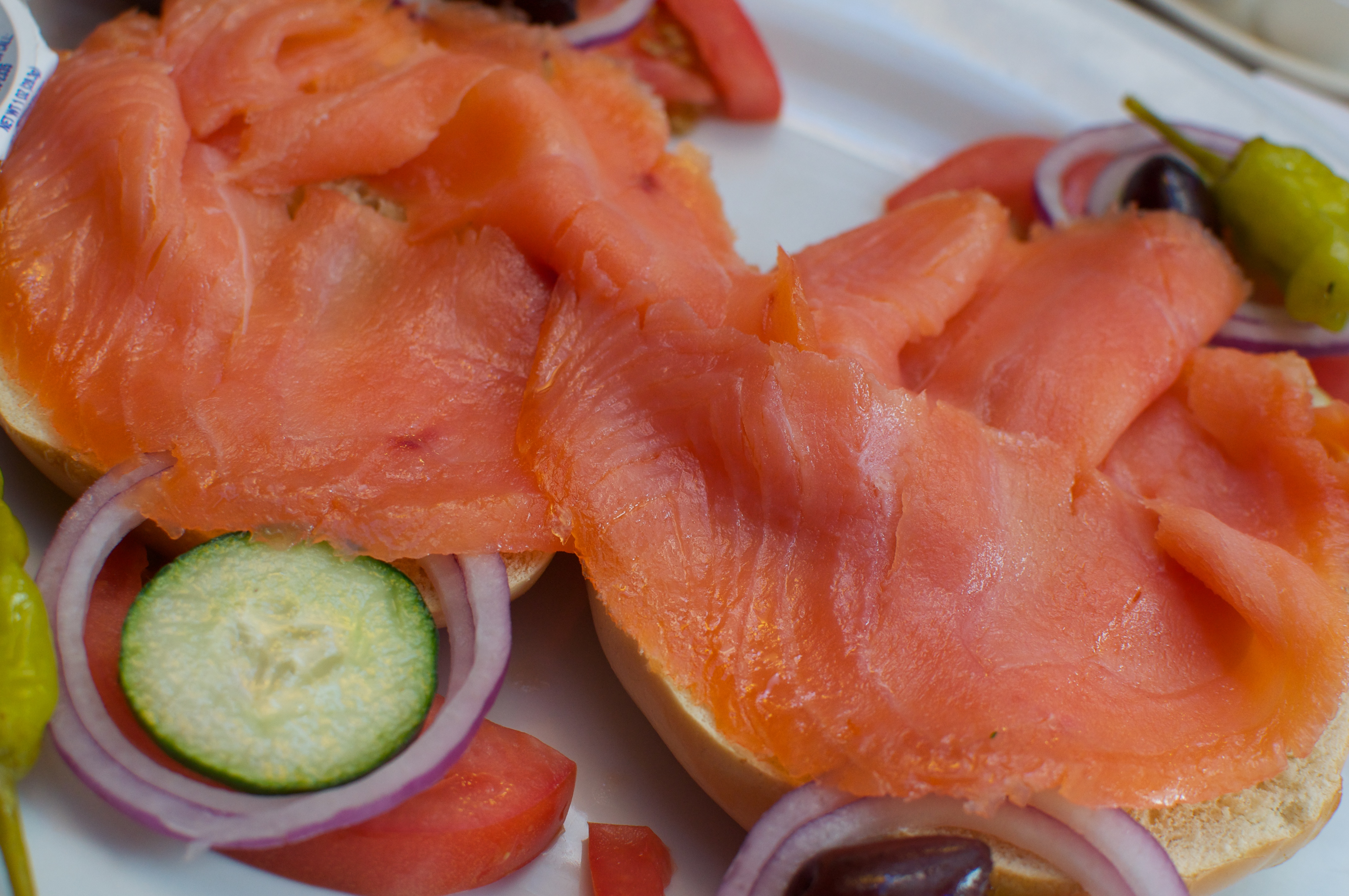
- Lox on bagel
- Course: Breakfast or lunch
- Region or state: New York City
- Associated cuisine: American Jewish cuisine
- Main ingredients: Salmon belly, salt

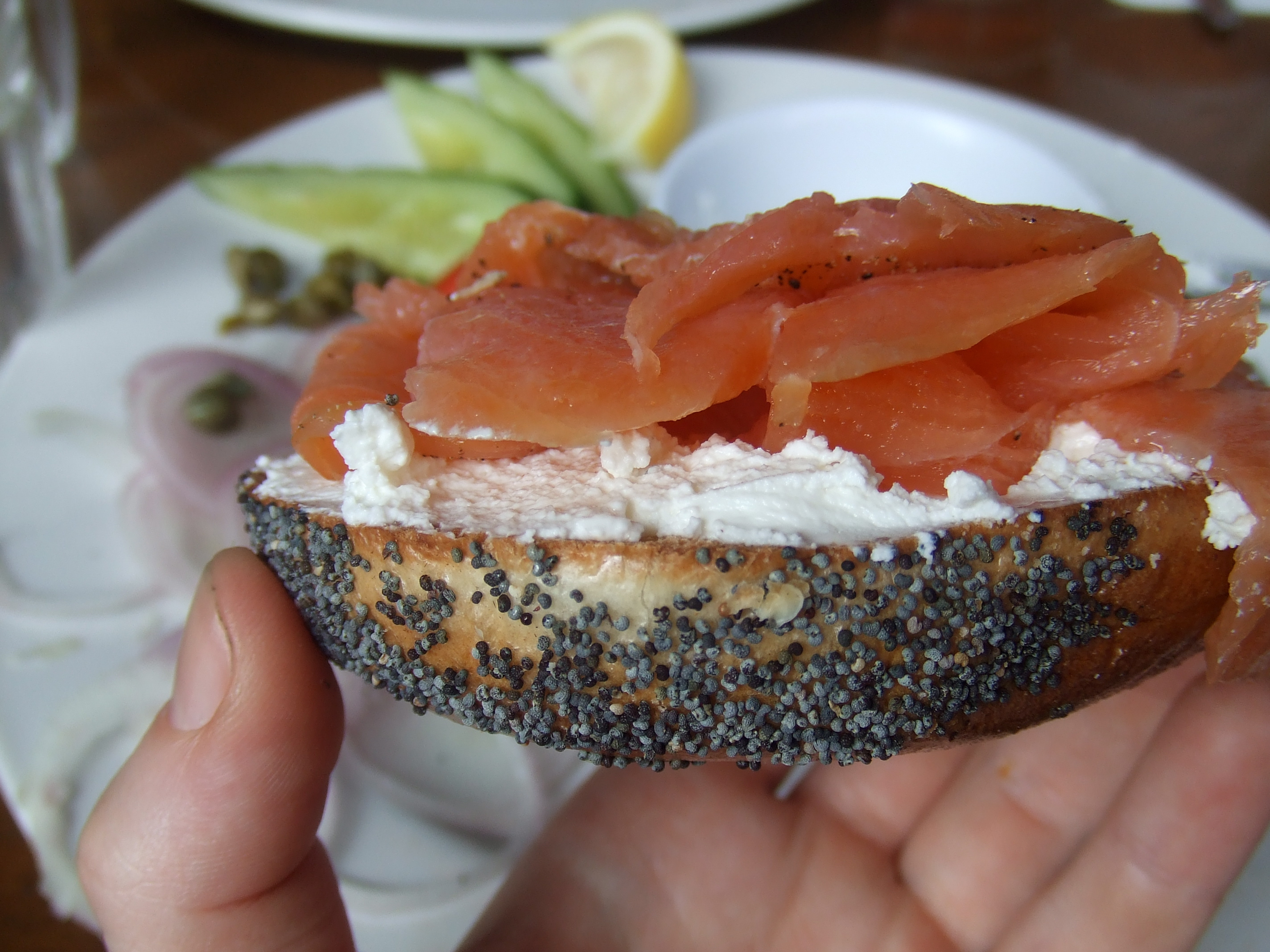
A "lox and a schmear" refers to a bagel and cream cheese with lox. This dish is a part of American Jewish cuisine.

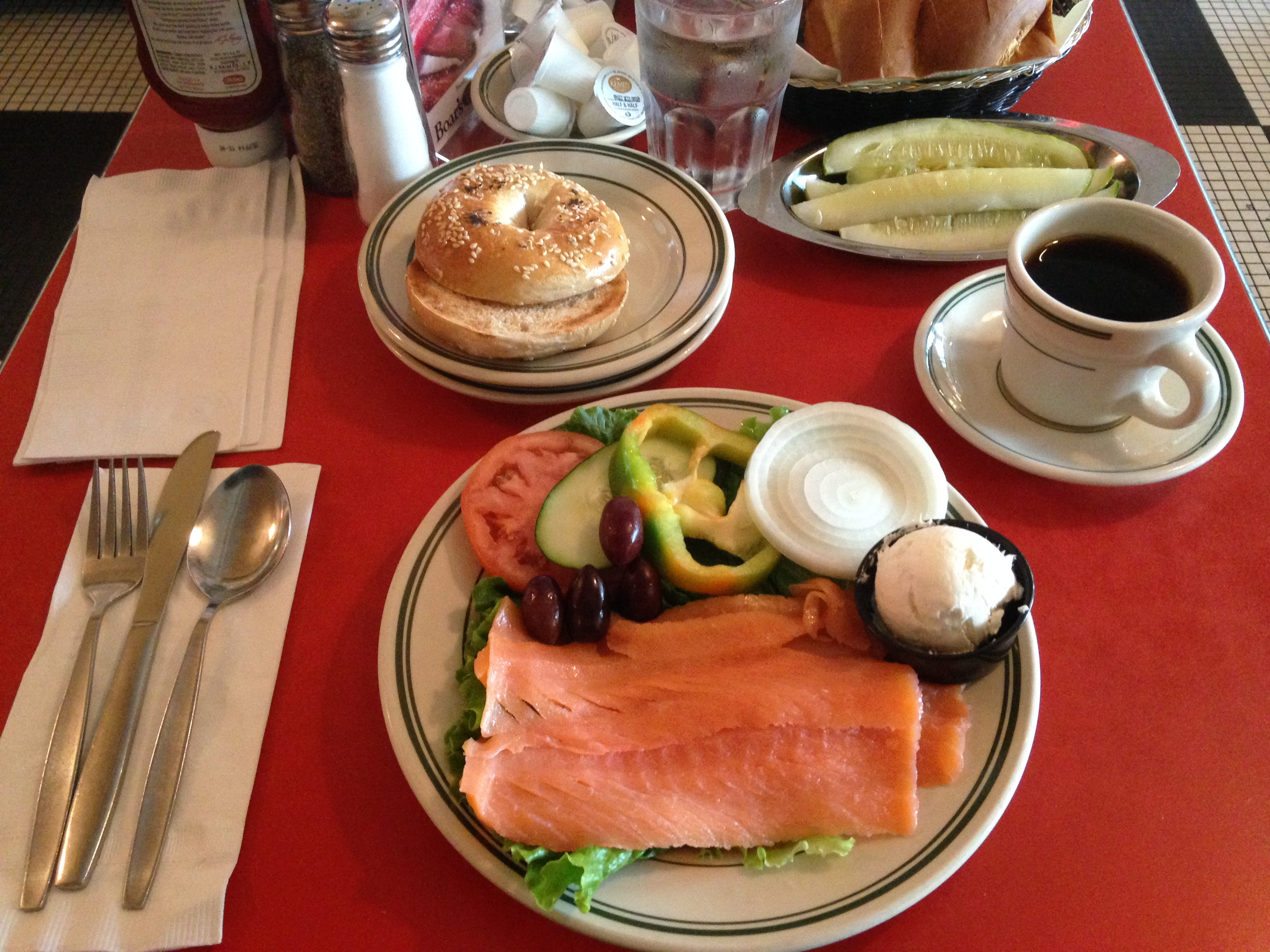
A lox platter for one

Lox is a fillet of brined salmon, which may be smoked. Lox is frequently served on a bagel with cream cheese, and often garnished with tomato, onion, cucumber, and capers.

== Etymology ==
The American English word lox is borrowed from Yiddish laks, meaning 'salmon',, which is derived from Middle High German lahs, stemming from Proto-Germanic *lahsaz and ultimately Proto-Indo-European (PIE) *laks. The word has various cognates in various Indo-European languages, including German Lachs. For example, cured salmon in Scandinavian countries is known by different versions of the name gravlax or gravad laks, with lax meaning salmon. In Swedish, gravlax translates to "buried Salmon". This is because originally fishermen buried freshly caught salmon underground and covered it with a variety of herbs and twigs. The word is so remarkably widespread and stable across IE languages that it probably existed in its current form in the PIE language itself. This wide distribution of the term was in the past used by linguists to argue for a placement of the PIE Urheimat in the watershed of the Baltic Sea before more modern linguistics determined that the original term likely referred to a different species of fish. This line of argument – called the Lachsargument – was common especially in German-speaking linguistics for almost a century. Native Americans also prepared this food, by smoking and drying salmon carcasses. In the Salish language, used by many tribes in the Pacific Northwest, the food is called sčədadxʷ. ( pronounced stchuh-dahw).

== Preparation ==
The traditional belly lox is known as such because it is made from the fatty fish belly. The cut is described as "paper-thin". Traditionally, the product is unsmoked and preserved by dry curing, leading to a very salty taste. As a result of consumer preferences, mass-produced "lox" generally use less salt and add cold smoke, making them more similar to a "Nova" (see below). A different cut may be used, too, in these versions.

A Nova or Nova Scotia salmon, sometimes called Nova lox, is cured with a milder brine and then cold-smoked. The cut remains thin, making it a middle ground between the old belly lox and regular smoked salmon. The name dates from a time when much of the salmon in New York City came from Nova Scotia. Today, however, the name only refers to the style of preparation and has no bearing on the source of the fish: they may come from other waters or even be raised on farms.

== Similar dishes ==
The following salmon dishes are almost never considered lox, as a thicker cut of fish is used.

- Scotch or Scottish-style salmon. A rub of salt and sometimes sugars, spices, and other flavorings is applied directly to the meat of the fish; this is called "dry-brining" or "Scottish-style." The brine mixture is then rinsed off, and the fish is cold-smoked.
- Gravad lax (laks) or gravlax. The traditional Nordic country method of preparing salmon, coating with or immersing the fish in a rub of dill, sugar, and salt and dry-curing it. The seasoning mixture may also variously include juniper berry, fennel, allspice or coriander. It is often served with a sweet mustard-dill sauce.

Other similar brined and smoked fish products include chubs, sable, smoked sturgeon, smoked whitefish, smoked tuna (prepared similarly to smoked salmon), and herring. These foods are popular in delis and gourmet stores, particularly in Northeastern US cities that received significant Jewish, Eastern European and Russian immigration (such as New York City, Philadelphia and Chicago).

The combination of bagels, lox and cream cheese developed in the United States as a staple of the appetizing store tradition. Under kashrut, fish is neither meat nor dairy, allowing it to be served with cream cheese.

== See also ==
- Dishwasher salmon
- List of smoked foods
- Smoked sable
- Smoked salmon
- Smoking (cooking)
