= Chopped liver =

Liver pâté popular in Ashkenazi Jewish cuisine

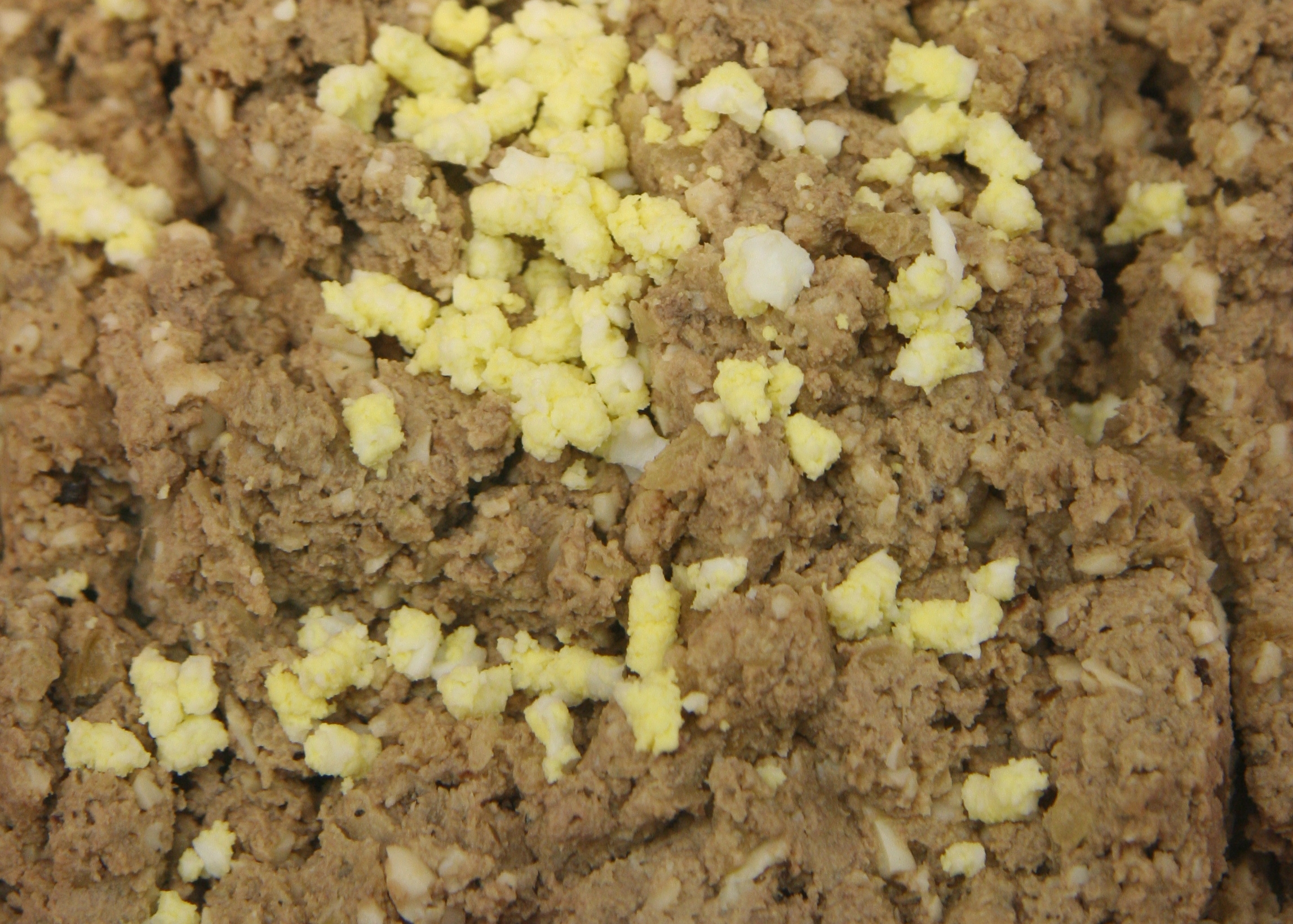
- Chopped liver with egg
- Alternative names: Gehakte leber
- Course: Hors d'oeuvre
- Associated cuisine: Ashkenazi Jewish
- Main ingredients: Liver, onions, schmaltz

Chopped liver (Yiddish: געהאַקטע לעבער, gehakte leber) is a liver pâté popular in Ashkenazi Jewish cuisine. This dish is a common menu item in kosher Jewish delicatessens in Britain, Canada, South Africa, Argentina and the United States. Historically, Ashkenazi Jewish communities used goose livers to make this dish; over time, chicken livers became the most commonly used ingredient.

== Preparation and serving ==
The dish is often made by sautéing or broiling liver and onions, adding hard-boiled eggs, salt and pepper, and grinding that mixture. The liver used is generally veal, beef, or chicken.

The quintessential fat used is schmaltz, but different methods and materials exist, and the exact process and ingredients may vary from chef to chef.

Chopped liver is often served on matzah, or with rye bread as sandwiches.

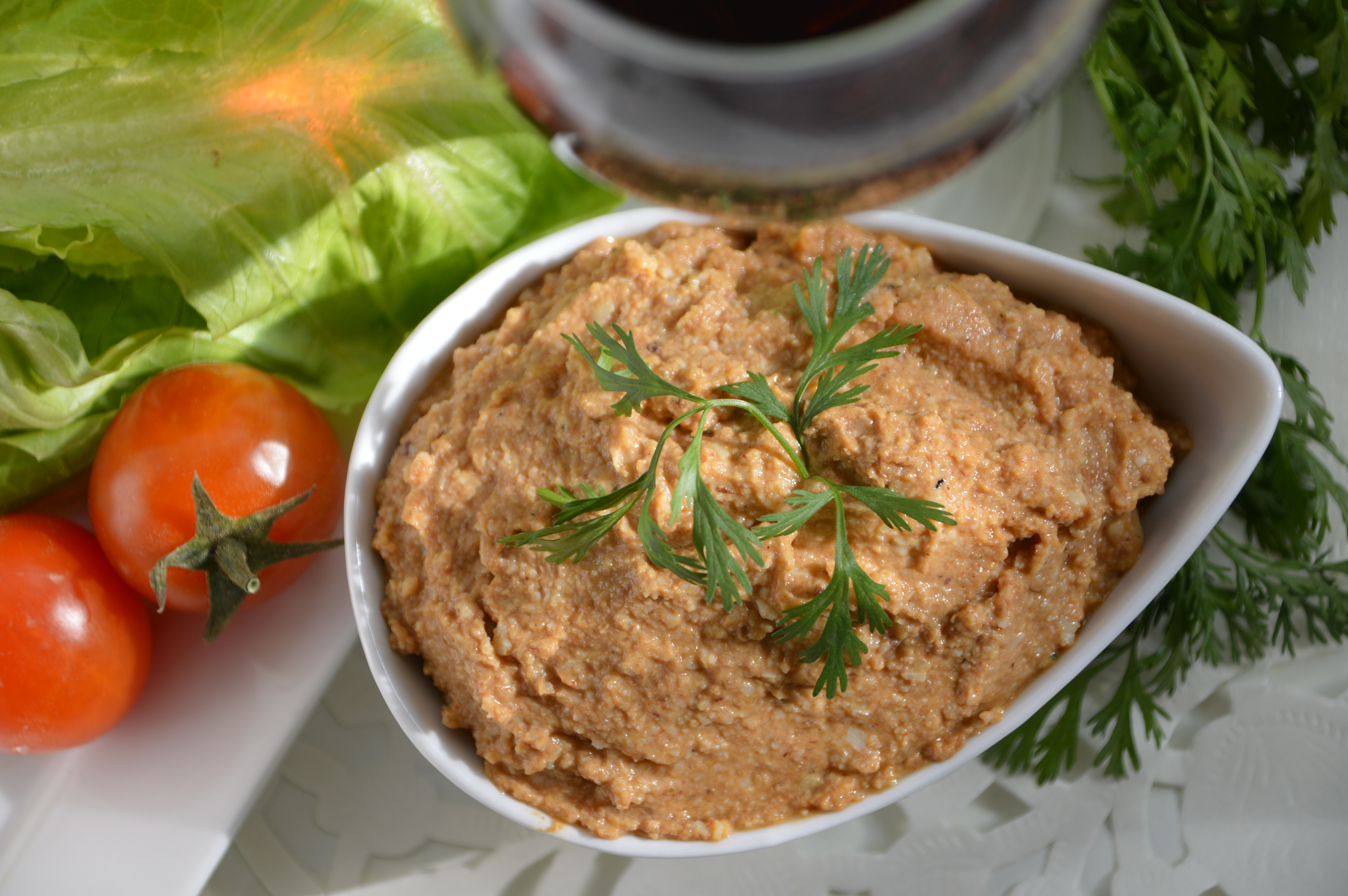
Chopped liver

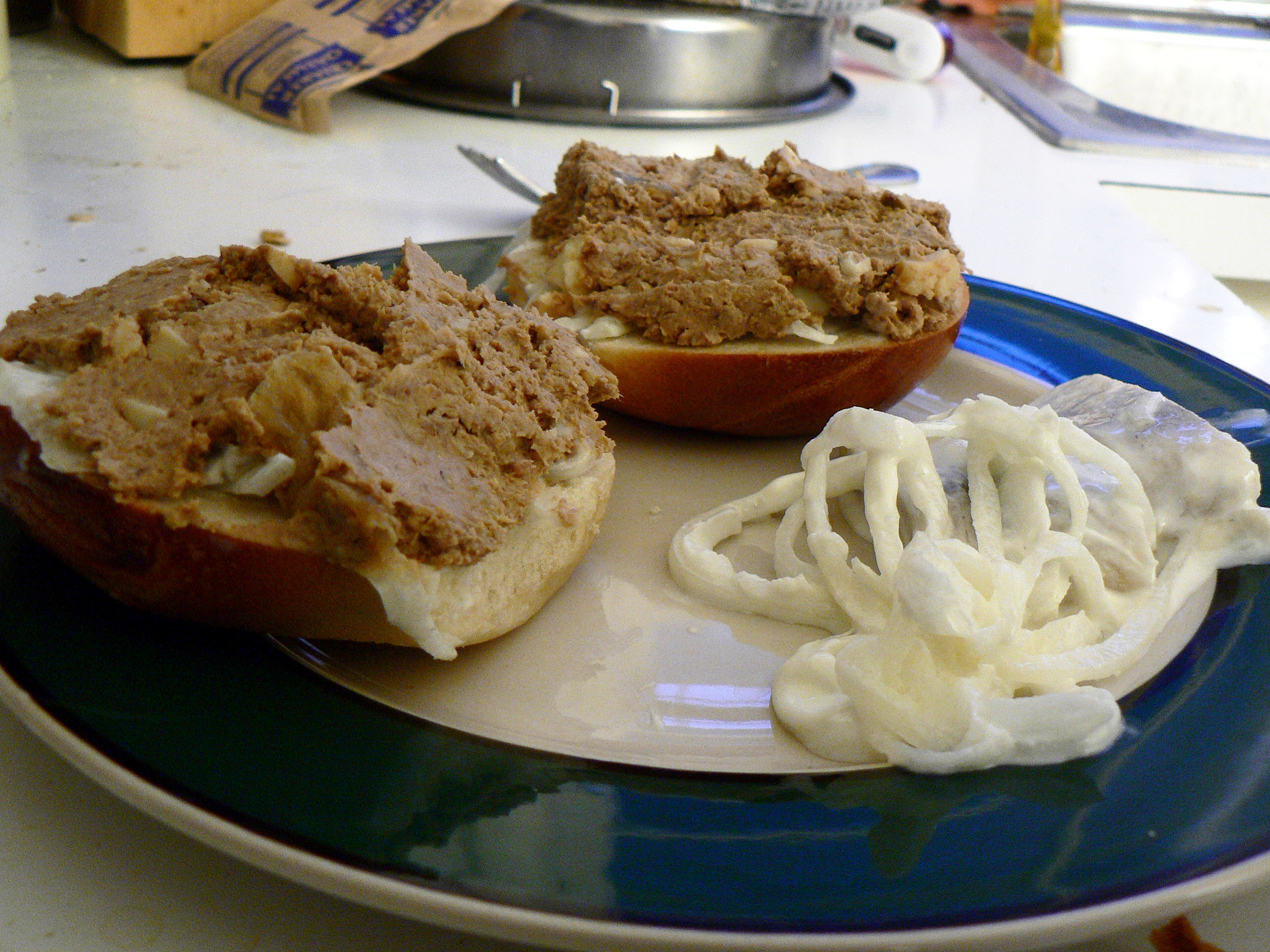
A chopped liver meal on bagels with sour cream herring and onions

== Variations and alternatives ==
Chopped liver is high in protein, but also high in fat and cholesterol. There are low-fat, mock and vegetarian alternatives, often made of a combination of peas, lentils, string beans, eggplant, or mushrooms.

== As an expression ==
In the idiom or expression, "What am I, chopped liver?", the term is used as a metaphor for one that is insignificant or not worth considering — a nobody.

The Random House Historical Dictionary of American Slang identifies the earliest use of the expression "chopped liver" in its derogatory sense—meaning "something trivial; something to be scoffed at"—as Jimmy Durante's statement on his 1954 CBS-TV show, "Now that ain't chopped liver."

In a 1980 monologue, Johnny Carson humorously referenced the phrase while discussing unemployment statistics, saying, "If everyone on welfare were chopped liver, you could spread them on a line of Ritz crackers from here to Bulgaria." A decade later, actor Michael Douglas used the phrase to express frustration about his secondary role in a movie, saying, "What was I—chopped liver or something?"

This show-business usage helped transform the dish into a metaphor for disdain. Its evolution may also have been shaped by underworld slang, where it referred to "a beaten and scarred person," and by the urban adaptation of the rural expression "That ain't hay." The dish became associated with triviality and was often used as a humorous metaphor by Jewish comedians in the Borscht Belt. Lexicographer Sol Steinmetz suggests that its status as a mere side dish or appetizer, overshadowed by staples like chicken soup or gefilte fish, made it an apt symbol of insignificance.

== Similar dishes ==
- Foie gras
- Leberpastete
- Liverwurst
- Maksalaatikko
- Pâté
