= Ben-Abraham =

ben Abraham, ben Avraham Ben-Abraham, etc. (Hebrew: בן אברהם) is a Hebrew patronymic, which may also be a surname. It literally means "son of Abraham". It may be either of historical usage or the result of the Hebraization of surnames, such as Abramovich, Abramovitz, etc. of immigrants to Israel. Notable people with the name include:

- Abraham ben Abraham
- Avi Ben-Abraham
- Bezalel ben Abraham Ashkenazi
- David ben Abraham ha-Laban
- David Raphael ben Abraham Polido
- Elisha ben Avraham
- Ezra ben Abraham
- Hayyim ben Abraham Uziel
- Isaac ben Abraham, multiple persons
- Jacob ben Abraham Kahana
- Jacob ben Abraham Zaddiq
- Jacob ben Abraham Faitusi
- Jonah ben Abraham Gerondi
- Joseph ben Abraham
- Joseph ben Abraham Gikatilla
- Mazhir ben Abraham
- Meir ben Abraham Angel
- Moses ben Abraham (disambiguation)
- Nathan ben Abraham I
- Nissan Ben-Avraham
- Obadiah ben Abraham of Bertinoro
- Saadia ben Abraham Longo
- Samson ben Abraham of Sens
- Samuel ben Abraham Aboab
- Sar Shalom ben Abraham
- Shabtai Zisel ben Avraham
- Shem Tov ben Abraham ibn Gaon
- Shlomo ben Avraham ibn Aderet
- Simchah ben Abraham Calimani
- Solomon ben Abraham of Montpellier
- Yaakov ben Avraham Costaro
- Yahoshafat Ben Avraham
- Yehuda ben Avraham Zarco
- Zedekiah ben Abraham Anaw
- Zvi Ben-Avraham
