= Abraham ben Mazhir =

Abū Ṭāhir Abraham ben Mazhir
- אברהם בן מזהיר
- Title: Gaon

Personal life
- Died: c. 1160
- Children: Nissim, Ezra, Sar Shalom, Mazhir
- Era: 12th century
- Known for: Head of the remnant of the Palestinian Gaonate in Damascus

Religious life
- Religion: Judaism

Jewish leader
- Predecessor: Solomon ben Elijah ha-Cohen (assumed)
- Successor: Ezra ben Abraham

Abū Ṭāhir Abraham ben Mazhir (Hebrew: אברהם בן מזהיר, Arabic: ابو طاهر, died c. 1160) was head of the remnant of the Palestinian Gaonate in Damascus in the first half of the 12th century.

== Details ==
Little is known about Abraham's origins. His father Mazhir is styled in a letter from the Cairo Genizah as "Yesod haYeshiva", "the foundation of the Yeshiva". In a different letter Abraham's family is referred to as "coming from the powerful family of Kohanim". This reference seems to indicate that Abraham's family was somehow related to the family of Kohanim who ruled the Palestinian Gaonate before him. Mann, followed by others, suggests that Abraham was the son-in-law of Solomon ben Elijah ha-Cohen Gaon, who had ruled as Gaon in Damascus in the first quarter of the 12th century.

It is unclear when Abraham started his position in the Gaonate. Some scholars believe he was already Gaon after the passing of the aforementioned Solomon ha-Cohen, while Masliah Gaon was head of the other division of the yeshiva in Fustat. Amir Ashur has argued that Masliah's control extended over Damascus and Abraham was not an opposing Gaon. Abraham is already mentioned as Gaon in a letter discussing the will of Masliah.

Abraham was visited by Isaac ibn Ezra in 1142. Isaac composed a poem in Abraham's honor and compiled a manuscript of poems that he gifted to Abraham. Abraham's interest in poetry is evident from this manuscript and the numerous other poems written for him.

== Family ==
Abraham had four children; Nissim, Ezra, Sar Shalom, and Mazhir. All are praised in the aforementioned poem that Isaac ibn Ezra wrote.

Judah al-Harizi, during his stay in Aleppo in circa 1215, met several of Abraham's descendants and wrote extremely highly of them. He mentions two of Nissim's sons, Azaryahu and Shmuel, as well as Shmuel's son Mazhir. A different poem of al-Harizi written in honor of Shmuel mentions an additional son of his named Eliezer. Al-Harizi dedicated his Tachkemoni to Shmuel and composed other poems in both his honor and in honor of his son Mazhir.

== Succession ==
Abraham's son Ezra succeeded his father in leadership of the Yeshiva. He already appears as Gaon in circa 1168, so his father must have passed before then. Abraham's second son Sar Shalom appears to have succeeded Ezra, and Mazhir outlived his two brothers and occupied a high position in the Yeshiva.

== Notes and references ==
=== Bibliography ===
- Al-Harizi, Judah (1924). Tachkemoni (in Hebrew). Leipzig.
- Ashur, Amir (2013). "A marriage contract written according to the Eretz-Israeli Tradition, written under the authority of Masliah Gaon from the Damascus Geniza". Pe'amim (in Hebrew). 135: 163–170.
- Assaf, Simcha (1930). קובץ של אגרות ר' שמואל בן עלי ובני דורו [Letters of R. Samuel ben Eli and his Contemporaries] (in Hebrew). Jerusalem.
- Benjamin of Tudela (1907). The Itinerary of Benjamin of Tudela. Translated by Adler, Marcus Nathan. London: Oxford University Press.
- Fleischer, Ezra (2006). "Hebrew Secular Poetry from Late Twelfth-Century Syria". Kobez al Yad (in Hebrew). 19 (XXIX): 83–135.
- Fleischer, Ezra (2002). "New Poems by Judah al-Harizi". Kobez al Yad (in Hebrew). 16 (XXVI): 85–139.
- Mann, Jacob (1935). Texts and Studies in Jewish History and Literature. Vol. 1. Hebrew Press of the Jewish Publication Society of America.
- Mann, Jacob (1920). The Jews in Egypt and in Palestine under the Fāṭimid caliphs; a contribution to their political and communal history based chiefly on genizah material hitherto unpublished. Vol. 1–2. Oxford University Press.
- Schmelzer, Menahem H. (1979). Poems of Isaac Ben Abraham Ibn Ezra (in Hebrew). New York: Jewish Theological Seminary.

Jewish titles
Preceded by Masliah ben Solomon ha-Cohen as head of both the Fustat and Damascus divisions
Preceded by Masliah ben Solomon ha-Cohen as head of both the Fustat and Damascus divisions	Palestinian Gaon in Damascus; Abraham ben Mazhir; 1140–c. 1160	Succeeded by Ezra ben Abraham
