= Mazhir ben Abraham =

Mazhir ben Abraham (Hebrew: מזהיר בן אברהם, died after 1191), known as Rabbi Mazhir the Third (Hebrew: רבינו מזהיר השלישי) was a senior member of the remnant of the Palestinian Gaonate in Damascus, a cantor, and a liturgical poet.

== Overview ==
Mazhir was the son of Abraham ben Mazhir, the Gaon in Damascus. Mazhir first appears in a poem of Isaac Ibn Ezra from 1142 dedicated to Mazhir's father that mentions his four children, including Mazhir. When Benjamin of Tudela visited Damascus in around 1168 he does not mention Mazhir, who had not yet assumed his position as the Third.

A letter from the Iraqi Gaon Samuel ben Ali from 1191 mentions "the honorable elderly Mazhir the Third". Scholars debate how to interpret the letter. According to Assaf and Fleischer the letter was written to Mazhir, who was then leading the Yeshiva but for whatever reason did not assume the title Gaon and remained as "The Third" (the level below Av Beit Din in the Palestinian Yeshiva). Mann disagreed and read the letter as saying that Mazhir was serving as the Third under a nephew of his, Abraham, a son of his brother Ezra.

Mazhir was also a cantor. This is known from the fact that he signs his name in one of the acrostics of his poems as "Mazhir the cantor".

A poem in honor of Mazhir was found in the Cairo Genizah.

== Poetry ==
Mazhir was a paytan, a liturgical poet, and a number of his compositions have survived, primarily in mahzorim of the Old Aleppo Rite. His poetry has been gathered and published with critical notes by Ezra Fleischer. Mazhir is unique among paytanim in his consistent use of enjambment in his poems.

== Notes and references ==
=== Bibliography ===
- Assaf, Simcha (1930). קובץ של אגרות ר' שמואל בן עלי ובני דורו [Letters of R. Samuel ben Eli and his Contemporaries] (in Hebrew). Jerusalem.
- Benjamin of Tudela (1907). The Itinerary of Benjamin of Tudela. Translated by Adler, Marcus Nathan. London: Oxford University Press.
- Fleischer, Ezra (2006). "Hebrew Secular Poetry from Late Twelfth-Century Syria". Kobez al Yad (in Hebrew). 19 (XXIX): 83–135.
- Mann, Jacob (1935). Texts and Studies in Jewish History and Literature. Vol. 1. Hebrew Press of the Jewish Publication Society of America.
- Schmelzer, Menahem H. (1979). Poems of Isaac Ben Abraham Ibn Ezra (in Hebrew). New York: Jewish Theological Seminary.
