= Sar Shalom ben Abraham =

12th century head of the Palestinian Gaonate in Damascus

Sar Shalom ben Abraham (Hebrew: שר שלום בן אברהם) was the head of the remnant of the Palestinian Gaonate in Damascus around the end of the 12th century.

== Details ==
Sar Shalom was the son of Abraham ben Mazhir, the Gaon in Damascus. Sar Shalom first appears in a poem of Isaac Ibn Ezra (he) from 1142 dedicated to Sar Shalom's father that mentions his four children, including Sar Shalom. When Benjamin of Tudela visited Damascus in around 1168 he found Sar Shalom as Av Beit Din and his brother Ezra as Gaon.

A letter from the Iraqi Gaon Samuel ben Ali from 1191 mentions Sar Shalom as Av Beit Din. Scholars debate how to interpret the letter. Assaf, the original publisher, and Fleischer both understood the letter as indicating that Sar Shalom was dead. Mann disagreed and read the letter as saying Sar Shalom was alive as Av Beit Din under a nephew of his, a son of his brother Ezra.

Sar Shalom is explicitly mentioned as Gaon in a copy of a commentary of the Karaite scholar Yefet ben Eli. A note on the manuscript states that the commentary was copied for the library of Sar Shalom. It is noteworthy that the Rabbinate Sar Shalom was interested in a copy of a commentary written by a Karaite.

Sar Shalom should not be confused with his contemporary in Fustat, the Gaon Sar Shalom ben Moses.

== Succession ==
The question of who succeeded Sar Shalom as Gaon is dependent on the scholarly debate quoted above. According to Assaf and Fleischer the Damascene Yeshiva in 1191 was headed by Sar Shalom's brother Mazhir, who for whatever reason did not assume the title Gaon and remained as "The Third" (the level below Av Beit Din in the Palestinian Yeshiva). According to Mann's approach, the above letter does not give any direct information about who reigned after Sar Shalom. Instead, the only available evidence is from Judah al-Harizi that a man named Sadoq was dismissed from the post of Gaon and later regained his position after 1215.

Jewish titles
| Preceded by Ezra ben Abraham | Palestinian Gaon in Damascus; Sar Shalom ben Abraham c. 1200 | Succeeded by possibly Sadoq |
