= Ben Abraham (disambiguation) =

Ben-Abraham is a Hebrew patronymic literally meaning "son of Abraham".

Ben Abraham may also refer to

- Ben Abraham (musician) (born 1985), Australian folk singer and songwriter
- Ben Abraham (referee), Australian soccer referee
- Ben Abraham (writer) (1924–2015), Polish-born Brazilian writer and historian
