= Vedyakova =

Vedyakov or Vedyakova is a Russian surname. Notable people with the surname include:

- Anatoly Vedyakov (1930–2009), Soviet racewalker
- Anastasia Vedyakova (born 1991), Russian violinist
