= Masliah ben Solomon ha-Cohen =

Gaon of the Palestinian Academy (died 1139)

Maṣliaḥ ben Solomon ha-Cohen
- מצליח בן שלמה הכהן
- A page from the Leningrad Codex. The passage at the bottom notes it was purchased by Masliah in 1134.
- Title: Gaon, Ra'is al-Yahud

Personal life
- Died: 1139 Fustat
- Children: Nissim, Ezra, Sar Shalom, Mazhir
- Parent: Solomon ben Elijah ha-Cohen (father)
- Era: 12th century
- Known for: Gaon of the Palestinian Gaonate in Fustat, Ra'is al-Yahud (Head of the Jews)

Religious life
- Religion: Judaism

Jewish leader
- Predecessor: Solomon ben Elijah ha-Cohen
- Successor: Abraham ben Mazhir (in Damascus)

Maṣliaḥ ben Solomon ha-Cohen (Hebrew: מצליח בן שלמה הכהן, Arabic: ابو منصور صالح بن سليمان الهاروني, Abū Manṣūr Ṣāliḥ bin Sulaymān al-Hārūnī; died 1139), alternatively Matzliach, was a Gaon and the leader of the Palestinian Gaonate in Fustat, the principal Talmudic academy and central legalistic body of the Jewish community in Palestine. He also held the title of Ra'is al-Yahud (Head of the Jews), from at least 1127 until his possible murder in 1139. After his death, the Gaonate split between Damascus in Syria and Fustat in Egypt.

== Biography ==
=== Early life ===
Masliah was a son of the previous Gaon, Solomon ben Elijah ha-Cohen, part of the Priestly family that had ruled the Palestinian Gaonate since the middle of the 11th century. A colophon from 1184 recorded that Masliah had a brother named Sadoq and a sister or sister-in-law, al-Kul Mubaraka. Two sons of Masliah are mentioned in a letter from the Geniza. Nothing more is known of them. A daughter, Alma'ah, appears in a colophon of a copy of a work of Samuel ben Hofni. Mann conjectures that the Gaon of Damascus Abraham ben Mazhir, who succeeded Masliah, was Masliah's brother-in-law. Masliah originally studied in the Palestinian Gaonate under his father in Damascus; a Genizah fragment mentions he attained the rank of "the Fourth" in the administration of the Yeshiva.

=== Reign ===
By 1127, he was Gaon in Fustat; a poem was written in honor of his arrival to the city. Masliah was accorded great honor by the ruling Muslim authorities, given a cloak of honor and the titles Jalāl al-Mulk (The Luster of the Empire) and Tāj al-Riyāsa (The Crown of the Leadership).

Masliah's authority was customarily invoked in legal documents and during the performance of certain rituals. His influence extended beyond Egypt; a query was sent to him from Yemen concerning the status of Chinese porcelain, and a manumission document for an Indian slave was written under his authority in Mangalore, India in 1132. Additionally, a Ketubah was written under his authority in Damascus, indicating that Syria was under his jurisdiction, the presence of other members of the yeshiva there notwithstanding. His authority, however, did not go untested. He was opposed by Iraqi Jews in Cairo, and controversy erupted in Aden, Yemen in the 1130s, when his opponents publicly forced an individual to recant a mention of Masliah in a public pledge of allegiance. Madmun bin Hasan-Japheth, a follower of Masliah, tried to steer a conciliatory course of action.

== Surviving writings ==
Many documents written under Masliah's authority survived in the Cairo Genizah. Israeli Talmudic scholar Yehudah Seewald has identified and published several of Masliah's sermons found in the Cairo Genizah, including for the Jewish holidays of Purim, Passover, Shavuot, and Yom Kippur. According to Seewald, Masliah had an affinity for Saadia Gaon, whose writings form the basis of much of Masliah's sermons.

Masliah was the owner of a number of valuable books and manuscripts, including, among others, the Leningrad Codex, a copy of Tractate Eruvin, and a copy of Rabbeinu Hananel's commentary on said tractate. Masliah's name is also appended to a copy of Kitāb Khalq al-Insān by Ibn al-Tilmidh.

In addition to Torah literature, Masliah valued poetry and song. A number of poems that were composed in his circle have survived in the Genizah.

== Death ==
Scholar Mordechai Akiva Friedman believes that Masliah, along with other members of the Jewish elite, was murdered in 1139 during the persecutions of Ridwan ibn Walakhshi, vizier of the Fatimid Caliphate, based on a letter from the Genizah and the testimony of medieval historian al-Maqrizi that Ridwan killed the Ra'is al-Yahud (Head of the Jews).

== Notes and references ==
=== Bibliography ===
- Ashur, Amir (2013). "A marriage contract written according to the Eretz-Israeli Tradition, written under the authority of Masliah Gaon from the Damascus Geniza". Pe'amim (in Hebrew). 135: 163–170.
- Franklin, Arnold (2010). "Maṣliaḥ ben Solomon ha-Kohen". Encyclopedia of Jews in the Islamic World. Leiden: Brill.
- Fleischer, Ezra (2005). "From the Diwan of the Secular Poetry of Rabbi Nathan ben Samuel 'Nezer ha-Haverim'". Kobez Al Yad (in Hebrew). 18 (XXVIII): 139–196.
- Friedman, Mordechai Akiva (2018). "Palestinian-style Prayer Books Written by the Scribe of the Leningrad Codex". Ginzei Qedem (in Hebrew). 14: 89–165.
- Friedman, Mordechai Akiva (2013). India Book: Halfon and Judah ha-Levi—the Lives of a Merchant Scholar and a Poet Laureate according to the Cairo Geniza Documents (Hebrew). Vol. IV/A. Ben Zvi Institute.
- Friedman, Mordechai Akiva; Goitein, Shelomo Dov (2007). India traders of the middle ages: documents from the Cairo Geniza : 'India book'. Études sur le judaïsme médiéval. Vol. 31. Brill. ISBN 9789047423072.
- Mann, Jacob (1935). Texts and Studies in Jewish History and Literature. Abraham and Hannah Oppenheim memorial publications. Vol. 1. Hebrew Press of the Jewish Publication Society of America.
- Mann, Jacob (1920). The Jews in Egypt and in Palestine under the Fāṭimid caliphs; a contribution to their political and communal history based chiefly on genizah material hitherto unpublished. Vol. 1–2. Oxford University Press.
- Seewald, Yehudah (2020a). "Sermon for Passover of Rabbi Matzliach Gaon". Beit Aharon V'Israel (in Hebrew). 208. Jerusalem: 5–20.
- Seewald, Yehudah (2020b). "A sermon for Purim of Rabbi Matzliach Gaon and a short commentary by Rasag to Esther". Beit Aharon V'Israel (in Hebrew). 207. Jerusalem: 5–19.
- Seewald, Yehudah (2019a). "Sermon for Yom Kippur of Rabbi Matzliach Gaon". Beit Aharon V'Israel (in Hebrew). 205. Jerusalem: 5–9.
- Seewald, Yehudah (2019b). "A sermon for Shavuot, from a series of sermons and essays from Rasag's beit midrash in Cairo". Beit Aharon V'Israel (in Hebrew). 203. Jerusalem: 14–33.

Jewish titles
Preceded by Solomon ben Elijah ha-Cohen
Preceded by Solomon ben Elijah ha-Cohen	Gaon of Palestine; Masliah ben Solomon ha-Cohen circa 1127–1139	Succeeded by Moses ben Netanel ha-Levi as head of the Egyptian branch of the yeshiva
Preceded by Solomon ben Elijah ha-Cohen	Gaon of Palestine; Masliah ben Solomon ha-Cohen circa 1127–1139	Succeeded by Abraham ben Mazhir as head of the Damascus branch of the yeshiva
