= Old Jewish Cemetery, Lublin =

Jewish cemetery in Lublin, Poland

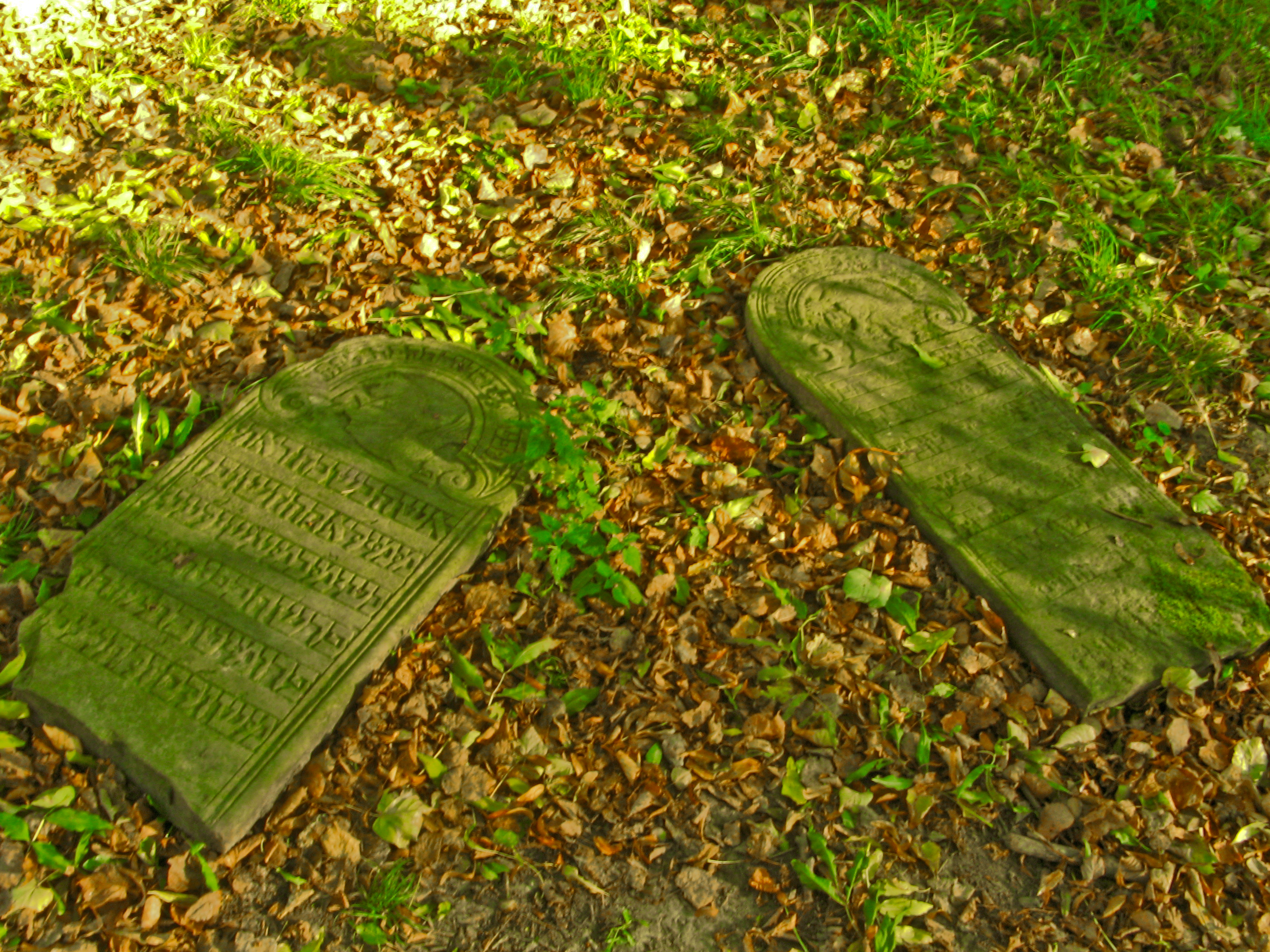
- Graves at Old Jewish Cemetery, Lublin.
- Interactive map of Old Jewish Cemetery, Lublin

Details
- Established: 1541 (probable)
- Location: Lublin
- Country: Poland
- Coordinates: 51°15′08″N 22°34′45″E
- Type: Jewish cemetery
- Size: 1 ha

The Old Jewish Cemetery (Polish: Stary Cmentarz Żydowski w Lublinie), in Lublin, Poland, is located on a hill between Kalinowszczyzna and Sienna Streets. The cemetery overlooks the Old Town and is entirely surrounded by a high, 17th-century wall. It is located on the site of a former medieval fortress, and was once surrounded by numerous backwaters.

Currently, the Old Jewish Cemetery in Lublin provides some of the last surviving physical evidence of the centuries-old presence of Jews in the city.

== History ==
The cemetery was probably founded in 1541, although some sources give a much earlier date. The first written mention of the cemetery dates from 1555, when a privilege was issued to Polish Jews permitting burial in the area.

Many distinguished representatives of the Lublin Jewish community are buried there. Many of them have monumental and richly decorated matzevot headstones (macewy), but there are also matzevot without ornaments, which are evidence of modesty. In 1939, the cemetery probably held up to 3,000 matzevot. During the German occupation of Poland (Second World War, 1939–1945) and the start of the Holocaust, many of the matzevot were demolished or were used for street paving. The matzevot of several significant figures, however, remain.

In the 1980s, the Association for the Preservation of the Jewish Heritage in Lublin (Towarzystwo Opieki nad Pamiątkami Kultury Żydowskiej) began to put the cemetery in order and to make a detailed inventory. Between 1988 and 1991 several antisemitic acts of vandalism took place, as a result of which 40 further matzevot were destroyed.

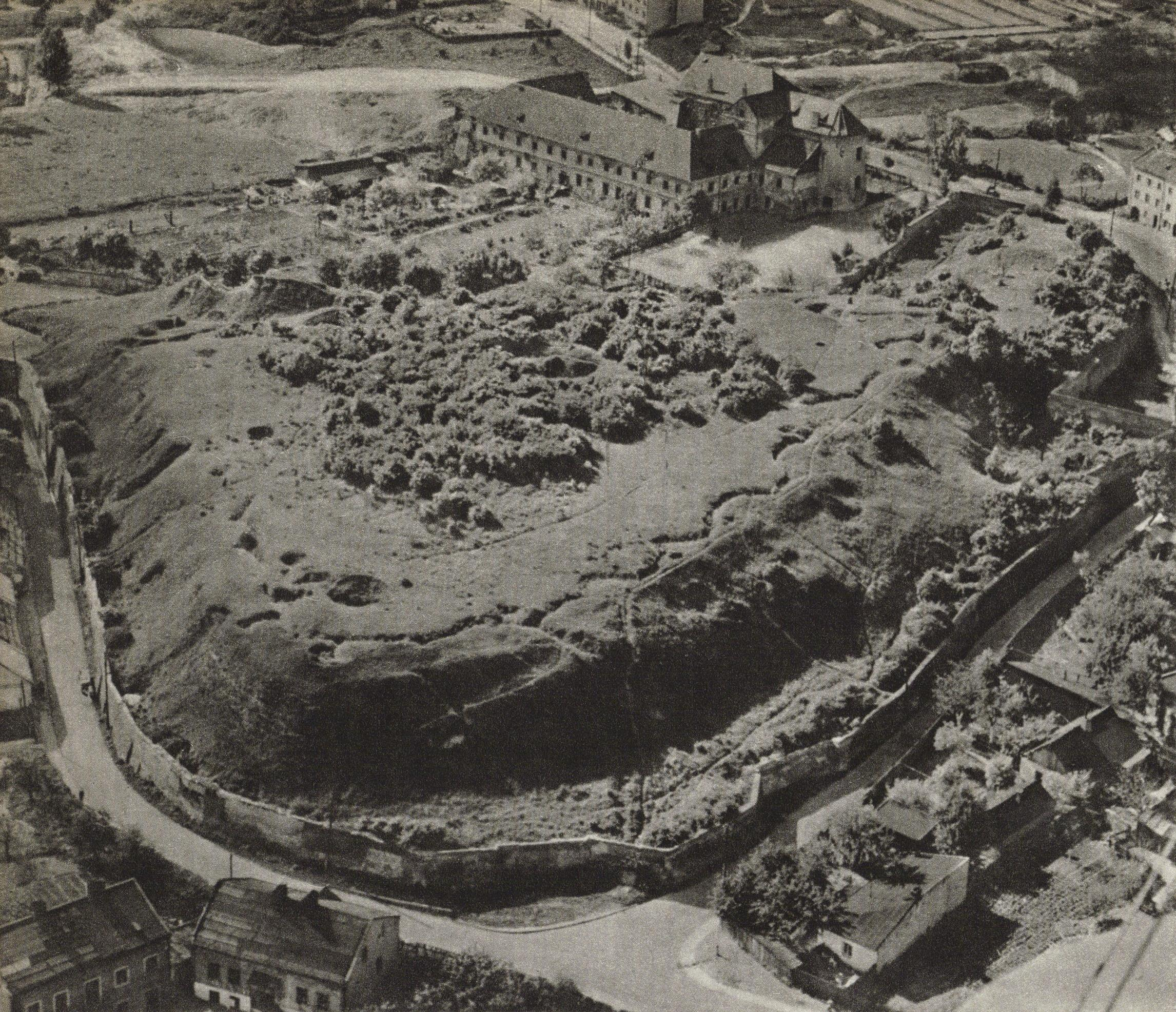
Aerial photo from 1964

== Notable interments ==
- Solomon Luria
- Yaakov Yitzchak, known as the "Seer of Lublin"
- Jacob Pollak
- Shalom Shachna
