= Miriam Shapira-Luria =

Talmudic scholar

- Born: Konstanz
- Other name: Rabbanit Miriam
- Known for: Woman Talmudic scholar
- Spouse: Yochanan Luria
- Parent: Solomon Shapira

Miriam Shapira-Luria, also known as Rabbanit Miriam, was a Talmudic scholar of the Late Middle Ages. According to academic Lawrence H. Fuchs, she was one of the "most noted" women Talmud scholars.

== Family ==
Miriam Shapira-Luria was born sometime in the 13th, late 14th or early 15th centuries in Konstanz, on the southern German border. Her father was Rabbi Solomon Shapira, a descendant of Rashi, an 11th century commentator. Shapira-Luria's brother was the noted rabbi, Peretz of Konstanz. Her husband, Yochanan Luria was a rabbi who was known to interpret the Talmud liberally.

== Talmud teacher ==
Shapira-Luria, also known as Rabbanit Miriam, taught in Padua, Italy. She conducted a yeshiva (a higher institution for the study of central Jewish texts) and gave public lectures on Jewish codes of law. She was thoroughly conversant in rabbinical writings, and Nahida Ruth Lazarus writes that her "Talmudic disputations with other distinguished scholars of her time created a great sensation." Female community teachers were rare in Jewish tradition but "not unheard of", according to Norma Baumel Joseph, who lists as other examples Huldah, Bruriah, Asenath Barzani, and Nechama Leibowitz (the latter's biographer, Yael Unterman, is a descendant of Shapira-Luria's herself).

Shapira-Luria was also known for her beauty, and she taught Talmud to elite young men from behind a curtain so that they would not get distracted by her appearance.

== Descendants ==
Shapira-Luria was the ancestress of the Luria rabbinical family, the grandmother of Solomon Luria (Maharshal), a posek (Jewish law decisor).

== See also ==
- Bat ha-Levi
