= Ezra ben Abraham =

Late 12th century Palestinian Jewish leader

Ezra ben Abraham (Hebrew: עזרא בן אברהם), also recorded as Azariah, was the head of the remnant of the Palestinian Gaonate in Damascus in the second half of the 12th century.

== Details ==
Ezra was the son of Abraham ben Mazhir, the Gaon in Damascus. Ezra first appears in a poem of Isaac ibn Ezra (he) from 1142 dedicated to Ezra's father that mentions his four children, including Ezra. When Benjamin of Tudela visited Damascus around 1168 he found Ezra, whom he refers to as Azariah, already as Gaon. Petachiah of Regensburg also mentions Ezra in his description of visiting Damascus around 1175. Petachiah notes that Ezra, the Rosh Yeshiva, is "filled with Torah" for he was ordained by the Baghdadi Gaon Samuel ben Ali.

A letter from the same Samuel ben Ali from 1172 includes a postscript and a signature of Ezra, who was then in Aleppo. Ezra is also mentioned in one fragment from the Cairo Genizah, which contains a prayer for Ezra in very flowery language.

Jacob Mann was of the opinion that there was a rivalry between the two branches of the Palestine Gaonate, the one in Damascus, led by Ezra, and the one in Fustat then led by Netanel ben Moses ha-Levi. According to Mann's reconstruction, Samuel ben Ali supported Ezra while Netanel was supported by the Babylonian Exilarch Daniel ben Hisdai. This was part of the larger rivalry between these two Babylonian figures.

By 1191 Ezra was no longer alive, as is clear from a different letter of Samuel ben Ali. Mann believed that this letter was sent to a son of Ezra named Abraham, who inherited the Gaonate from him. Assaf and Fleischer understood the letter differently, and do not believe there is any evidence for such an individual. According to the later approach, Ezra was likely succeeded by his brother Sar Shalom.

Jewish titles
Preceded by Abraham ben Mazhir	Palestinian Gaon in Damascus; Ezra ben Abraham c.1160-1170s	Succeeded by likely Sar Shalom ben Abraham
