= Ezrun =

10th century rabbi

Ezrun (Hebrew: עזרון) was a head of the Palestinian Gaonate in the 10th century.

== Details ==
According to a fragment found in the Cairo Genizah (T.S. 312.82), as reconstructed by Gil, Ezrun reigned for thirty years as Gaon after Joseph ben Ezrun ha-Cohen, who was possibly his father.

Jewish titles
Preceded by Joseph ben Ezrun ha-Cohen	Gaon of Palestine; Ezrun mid-10th century	Succeeded by Samuel ben Joseph ha-Cohen
