= Kalonymus Haberkasten =

Kalonymus Haberkasten was a rabbi and Talmudist in sixteenth-century Poland. He is well known as the rosh yeshiva of many great rabbis, including Rabbi Solomon Luria, who married his daughter Lipka.

Haberkasten was a rosh yeshiva in Lviv and was later the first rabbi of the city of Ostroh, Volhynia. He left Ostroh to assume the position of rosh yeshiva in Brest and Luria succeeded him in Ostroh. Haberkasten then went to Ottoman Syria in about 1560.

Haberkasten was also a Kabbalist and was known to have made the acquaintance of the great Kabbalists in the Holy Land, including Rabbi Chaim Vital.
