= Russ & Daughters =

Appetizing store in Manhattan, New York

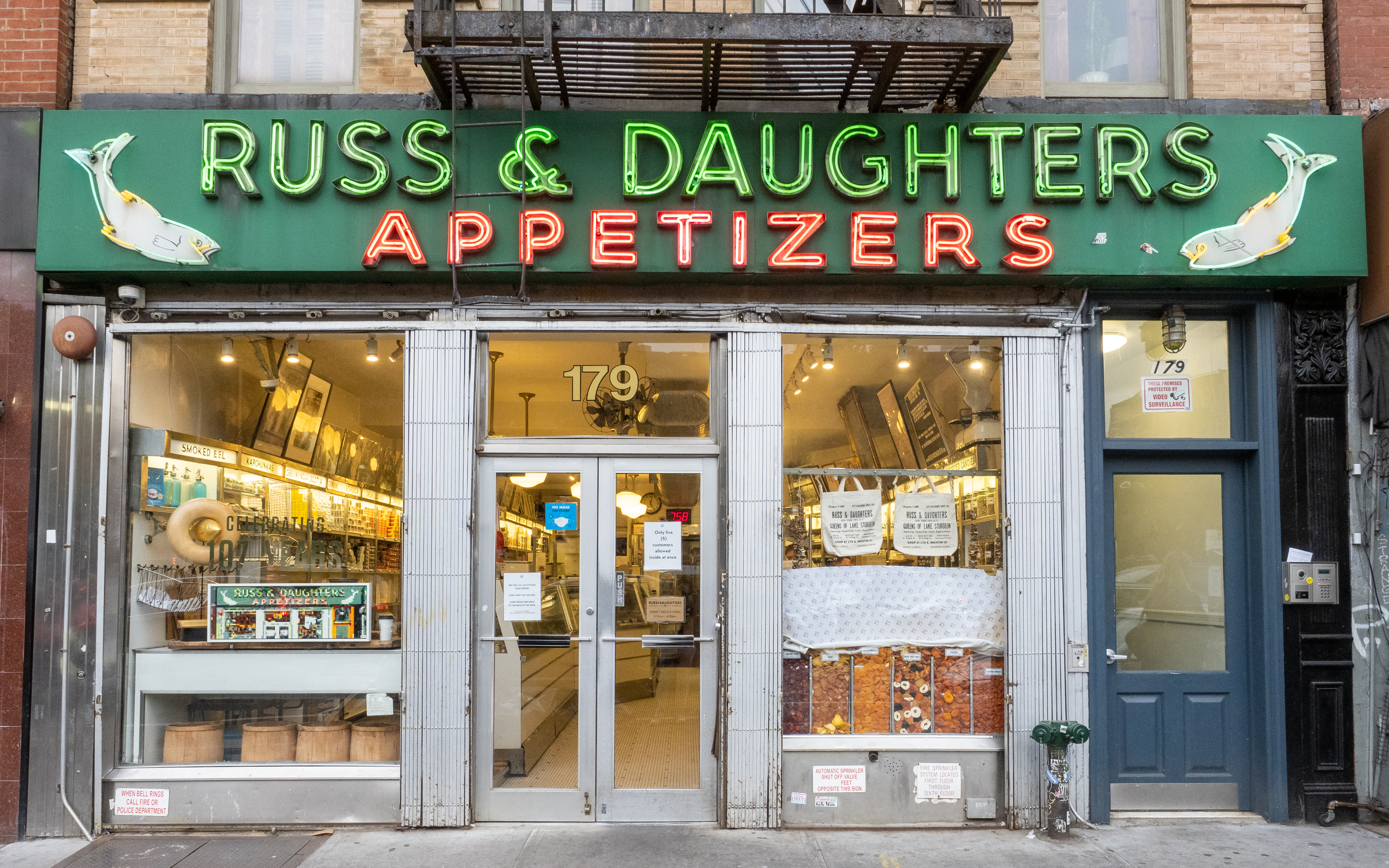
- Interactive map of Russ & Daughters

Restaurant information
- Established: 1914
- Owners: Josh Russ Tupper and Niki Russ Federman
- Food type: appetizing store
- Dress code: Casual
- Location: 179 E Houston Street, Manhattan, New York, 10002, United States
- Coordinates: 40°43′21″N 73°59′18″W
- Other locations: Hudson Yards
- Website: Official website

Russ & Daughters is an appetizing store that opened in 1914. It is located at 179 East Houston Street, on the Lower East Side of Manhattan, New York City. A family-operated store, it has been at the same location since 1920.

== History ==
Joel Russ, a Jewish immigrant from Strzyżów, Poland, who arrived in Manhattan around 1905, started a business to cater to Jewish immigrants settling on the Lower East Side of Manhattan. He began by carrying Polish mushrooms on his shoulders, and saved enough money to purchase a pushcart. He then expanded his operation and sold pickled herring as well as Polish mushrooms. Then, in 1914, Russ opened J Russ International Appetizers, a storefront around the corner from the store's current location.

In 1920, Russ moved the store to its current location of 179 East Houston Street. In 1933, he renamed the business "Russ & Daughters" after making his three daughters Hattie, Anne, and Ida partners in the store. Historically, businesses typically took on the name "and sons", but since Russ and his wife Bella had only daughters, his business became Russ & Daughters. However, Russ was not a feminist. For him, getting his daughters into the family business was not a matter of women's rights, but a matter of parnosa, or surviving to make a business. As he put it, he was concerned with Vi nempt men parnosa, meaning "from where do we take our living." According to Hattie, she and the other daughters had all worked in the store "since they were 8 years old" on weekends, fishing out the herring fillets from the pickle barrels. Once each one of them finished high school, they all worked full-time. Moreover, Russ kept the store open seven days a week.

Calvin Trillin wrote about Russ & Daughters in the 1970s in his New Yorker food pieces.

In 2008 The Jews of New York documentary premiered on PBS, featuring three generations of the Russ & Daughters family (Anne Russ Federman and Hattie Russ Gold, the two surviving Russ daughters; Mark Russ Federman, then the proprietor; Niki Russ Federman; and Josh Russ Tupper.) The documentary tells, among other things, the story of Russ & Daughters from the early 1900s to the (then) present. The third daughter, Ida, had died.

Russ & Daughters: Reflections and Recipes from the House That Herring Built, by Mark Russ Federman (grandson of Joel Russ), with an introduction by Calvin Trillin, was published in 2013.

Russ & Daughters received the 2013 Jewish Cultural Achievement Award, making it the first restaurant to receive a Jewish Cultural Achievement Award.

In 2014, The Sturgeon Queens, a documentary about Russ & Daughters, premiered. It features, among others, Anne Russ Federman, 92 years old at the time, and Hattie Russ Gold, 100 years old at the time, who were the two surviving Russ daughters. The Sturgeon Queens was Joel Russ' affectionate nickname for his daughters.

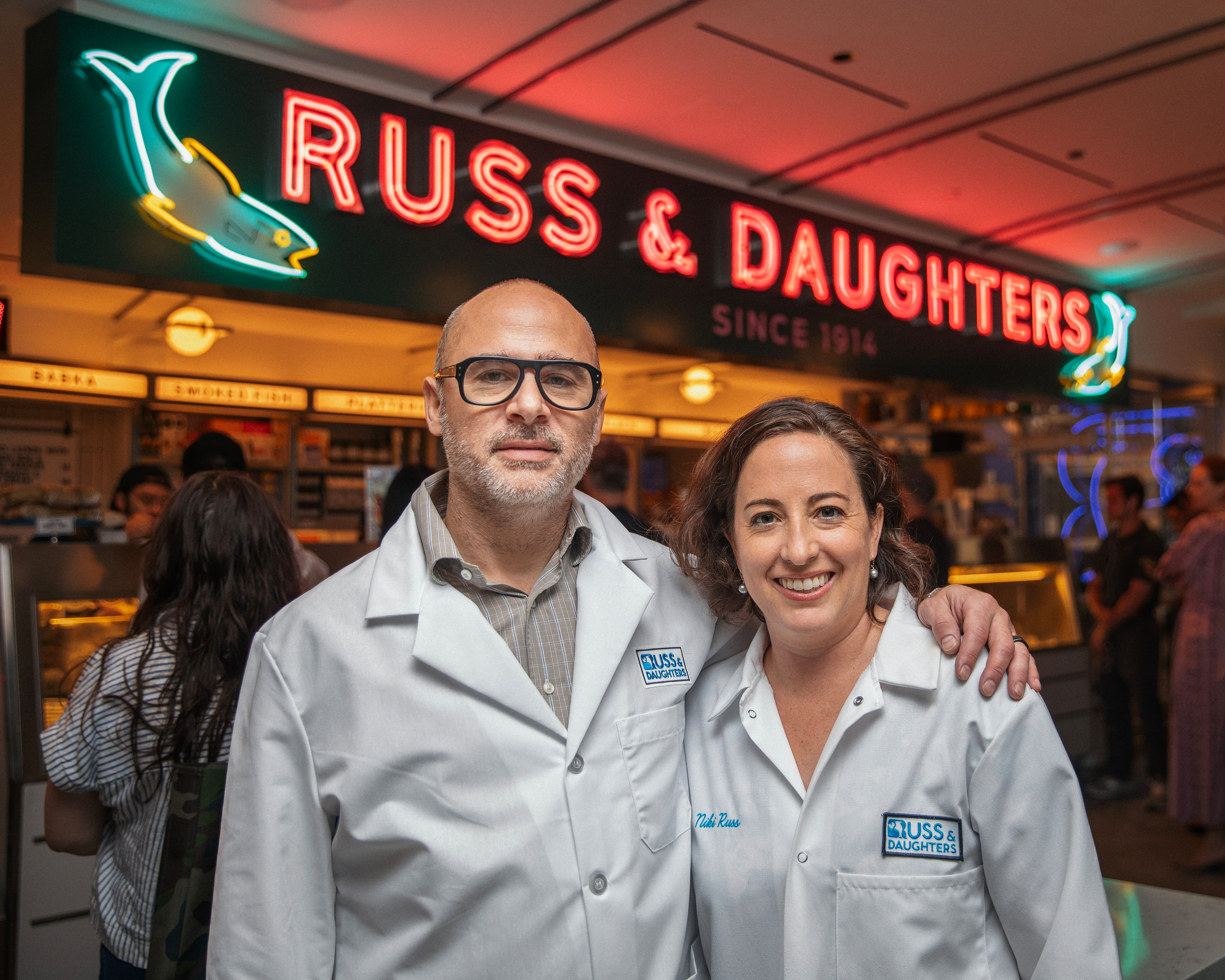
Cousins Josh Russ Tupper and Niki Russ Federman in the Hudson Yards outpost

Josh Russ Tupper and Niki Russ Federman, cousins, now run Russ & Daughters, the 4th generation of Russes to do so.

In 2015 the New York state Senate honored Russ & Daughters with a resolution marking its 100th anniversary; the resolution had been drafted in June 2014 but was presented to the Russ & Daughters staff on January 7, 2015.

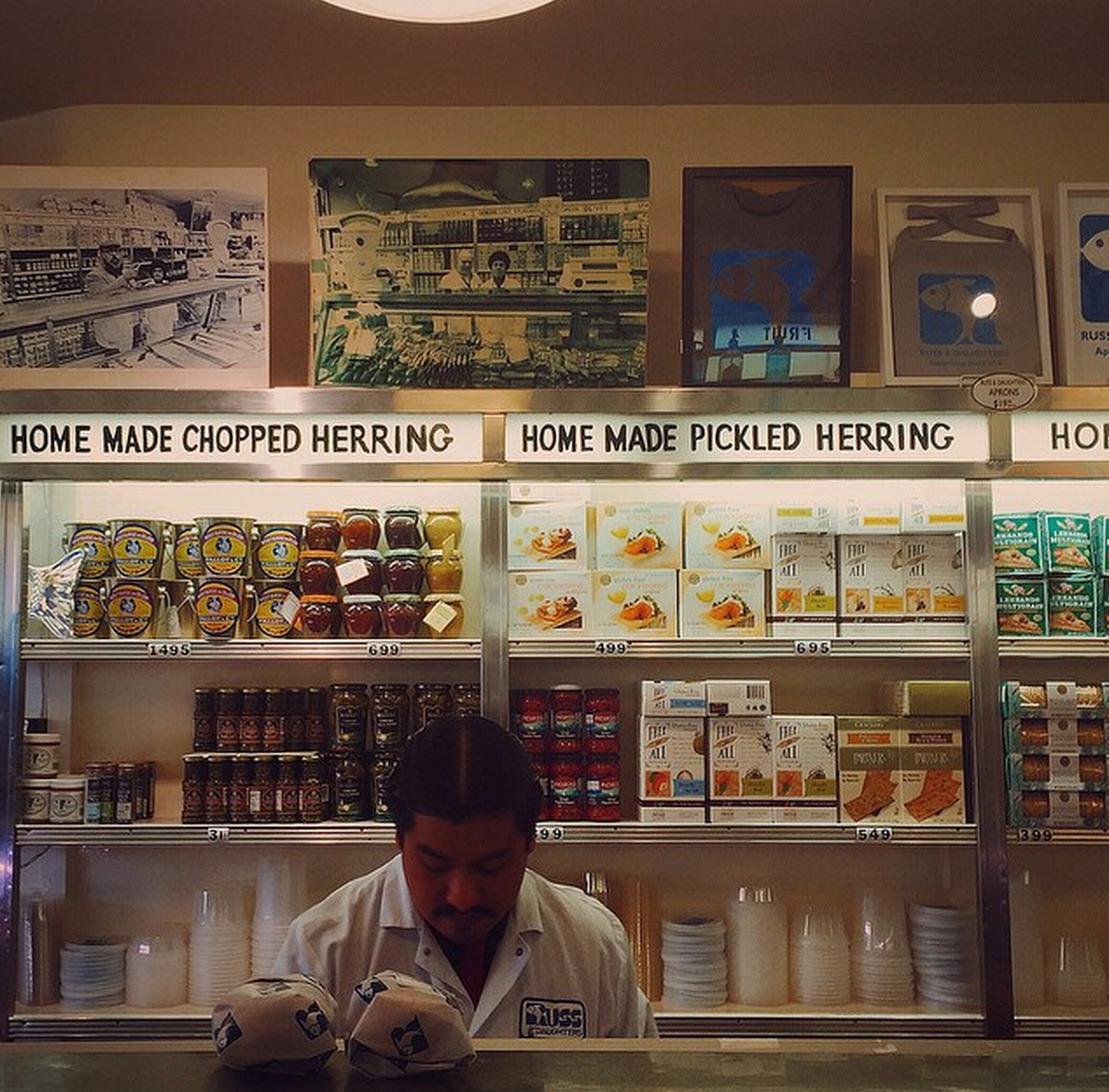
The interior counter of Russ and Daughters

=== Additional locations ===
In May 2014, Tupper and Federman opened the restaurant Russ & Daughters Café on Orchard Street.

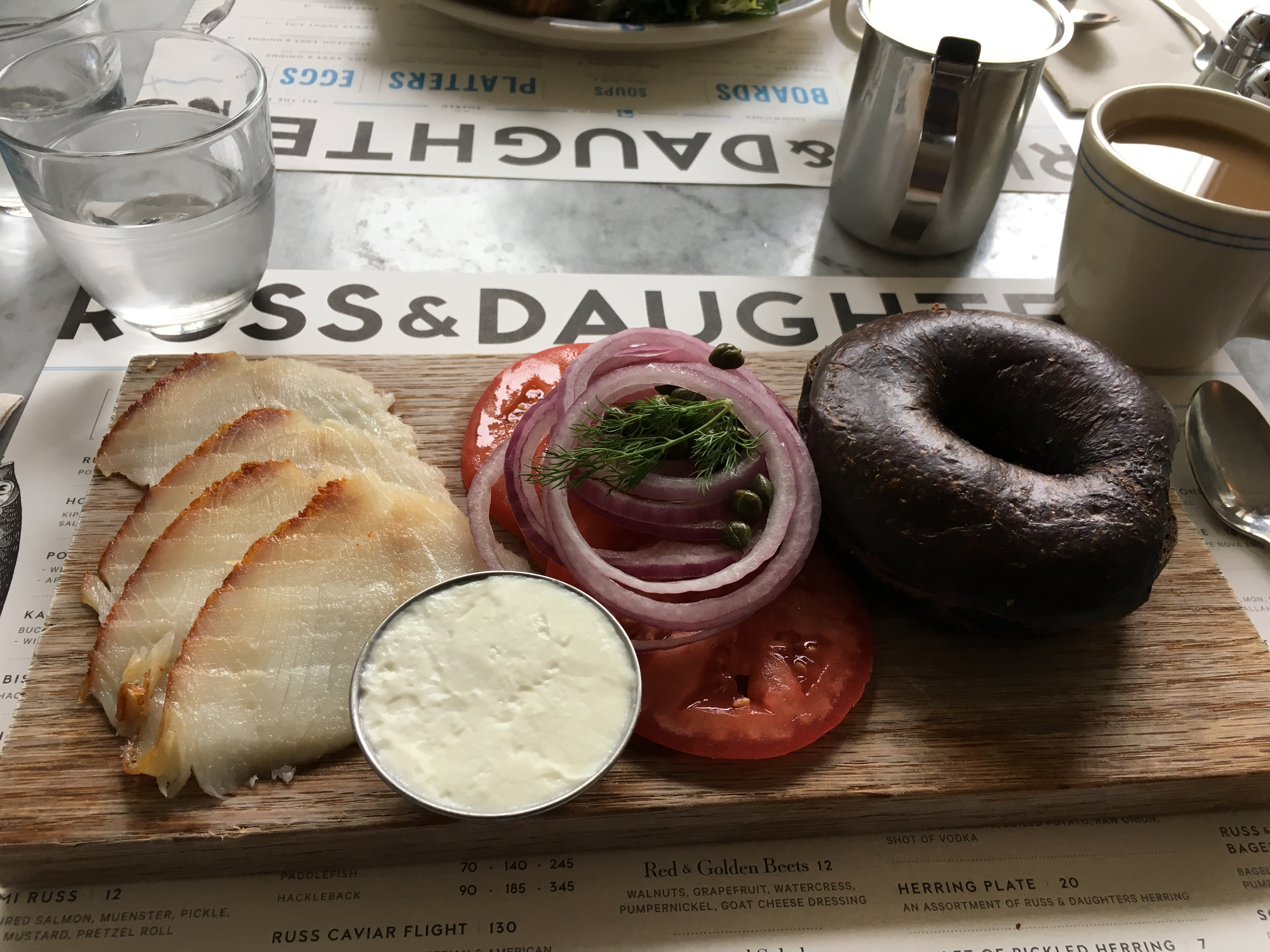
Mensch Board from Russ and Daughters Café on Orchard

In late 2014, a restaurant cafe was announced for the Jewish Museum. The Russ & Daughters restaurant in the Jewish Museum opened in February 2016, but has since closed.

In early 2019, an 18,000-square-feet location opened at the Brooklyn Navy Yard.

On July 18, 2023, Tupper and Federman opened a new 4,500-square-foot outpost near Hudson Yards.

== In popular culture ==
Josh Russ Tupper appeared on The Martha Stewart Show to make Chopped Liver, the Oy Vey Schmear sandwich, Whitefish & Baked Salmon Salad and the Super Heebster sandwich.

The Leonard Lopate Show on NPR discussed Russ & Daughters. WNYC featured Russ & Daughters when Amy Eddings reported on "Last Chance Foods", in a segment called "A Palatable Passover: Russ & Daughters explains matzo, gefilte fish and charoset."

Russ & Daughters was also featured on two episodes of the TV series Louie and in the theatrical movie Lola Versus.

Anthony Bourdain covered Russ & Daughters in the 'Disappearing Manhattan' episode of Anthony Bourdain: No Reservations (Season 5, Episode 6) with American journalist and novelist, Joel Rose.

In 2021, the Financial Times ranked it as one of the "50 greatest food stores in the world".

== See also ==
- List of Ashkenazi Jewish restaurants
