= Moses Isserles =

Polish rabbi

Rabbi Moses Isserles (Rema)
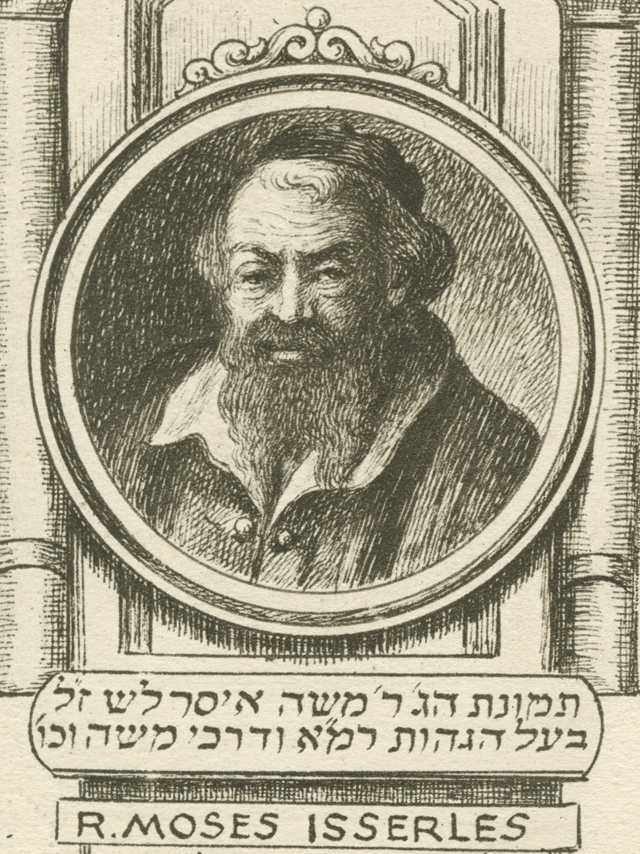
- Portrait by Meir Kunstadt, early 1900s

Personal life
- Born: 22 February 1530 Kraków, Kingdom of Poland
- Died: 10 May 1572 (aged 42) Kraków, Polish–Lithuanian Commonwealth
- Buried: Kraków, Poland
- Parents: Israel ben Josef (father); Malka (mother)
- Occupation: Rabbi, Talmudist, and Posek

Religious life
- Religion: Judaism

Moses Isserles (Hebrew: משה בן ישראל איסרלישׂ; Polish: Mojżesz ben Israel Isserles; 22 February 1530/25 Adar I 5290 – 11 May 1572/18 Iyar 5332), also known by the acronym Rema, was an eminent Polish Ashkenazi rabbi, talmudist, and posek (expert in Jewish law).

== Biography ==
Isserles was born in Kraków, Poland. His father, Israel ben Josef (known as Isserl), was a prominent talmudist and independently wealthy, who had probably headed the community; his grandfather, Yehiel Luria, was the first rabbi of Brisk. In an era which preceded the common use of surnames, Moses became known by his patronymic, Isserles.

At first he studied at home, and then in Lublin under Rabbi Shalom Shachna, who would later become his father-in-law. Among his fellow pupils were his relative Solomon Luria (a.k.a. the Maharshal)—later a major disputant of many of Isserles' halakhic rulings, and Chayyim ben Bezalel, an older brother of the Maharal. His first wife died young, at the age of 20 and he later established the "Rema Synagogue" in Kraków in her memory (originally his house, built by his father in his honor—which he gave to the community). He later married the sister of Joseph ben Mordechai Gershon Ha-Kohen.

He returned to Kraków in 1549, establishing a large yeshiva; where as a wealthy man, he supported his pupils. In his teaching, he was opposed to pilpul and emphasized simple interpretation of the Talmud. In 1553 he was appointed as dayan. He was approached by many other well-known rabbis, including Yosef Karo, for Halachic decisions. He was one of the greatest Jewish scholars of Poland, and was the primary halakhic authority for European Jewry of his day. In this context, he was also approached by Meir Katzenellenbogen to issue a ruling in the Bragadin-Giustiniani dispute, one of the earliest instances of a copyright suit over any book.

He died in Kraków and was buried next to his synagogue. On his tombstone is inscribed: "From Moses (Maimonides) to Moses (Isserles) there was none like Moses". Until the Second World War, thousands of pilgrims visited his grave annually on Lag Ba'omer, his Yahrzeit (date of death).

Not only was Isserles a renowned Talmudic and legal scholar, but he was also learned in Kabbalah and studied history, astronomy, and philosophy. Many had criticized Maimonides' heavy use of philosophy, and these criticisms continued into Isserles' day. He, on the other hand, took a moderate approach despite being concerned with philosophy entering into education. He stated that philosophy should be learned only "sporadically", and that religious scripture should always be held in a higher esteem. Around 1550, he had several correspondences with Rabbi Solomon Luria. Isserles represented the pro-philosophy aspect of study, while Luria was more critical.

Isserles taught that "the aim of man is to search for the cause and the meaning of things." He also held that "it is permissible to know and then study secular wisdom, provided that this excludes works of heresy... and that one [first] knows what is permissible and forbidden, and the rules and the mitzvot". Maharshal reproached him for having based some of his decisions on Aristotle.[reference needed] His reply was that he studied Greek philosophy only from Maimonides' Guide for the Perplexed, and then only on Shabbat and Yom Tov – and furthermore, it is better to occupy oneself with philosophy than to err through Kabbalah.

Despite his suggestions about learning philosophy sparingly, Isserles and his students are considered the "first wave" of philosophical learning within Polish Jewry and is deemed the "Isserles School" by Leonard S. Levin.

Isserles had several children: "Drezil (named after his maternal grandmother), wife of R. Bunem Meisels. A daughter whose name is unknown to us.... A son, R. Yehuda.... A third daughter... who is totally unknown to us." He is buried in the eponymous Remuh Cemetery in Kraków.

== Genealogy ==
Some legends link Isserles to King David through Rashi. Many also connect him to later historical figures, such as members of the Meisel family, Rabbi Yakov Kuli Slonim, son-in-law of the Mittler Rebbe, the composers Felix Mendelssohn and Giacomo Meyerbeer, the pianist Julius Isserlis, the cellist Steven Isserlis, the author Inbali Iserles, the mathematician Arieh Iserles and the statistician Leon Isserlis.

== Approach ==
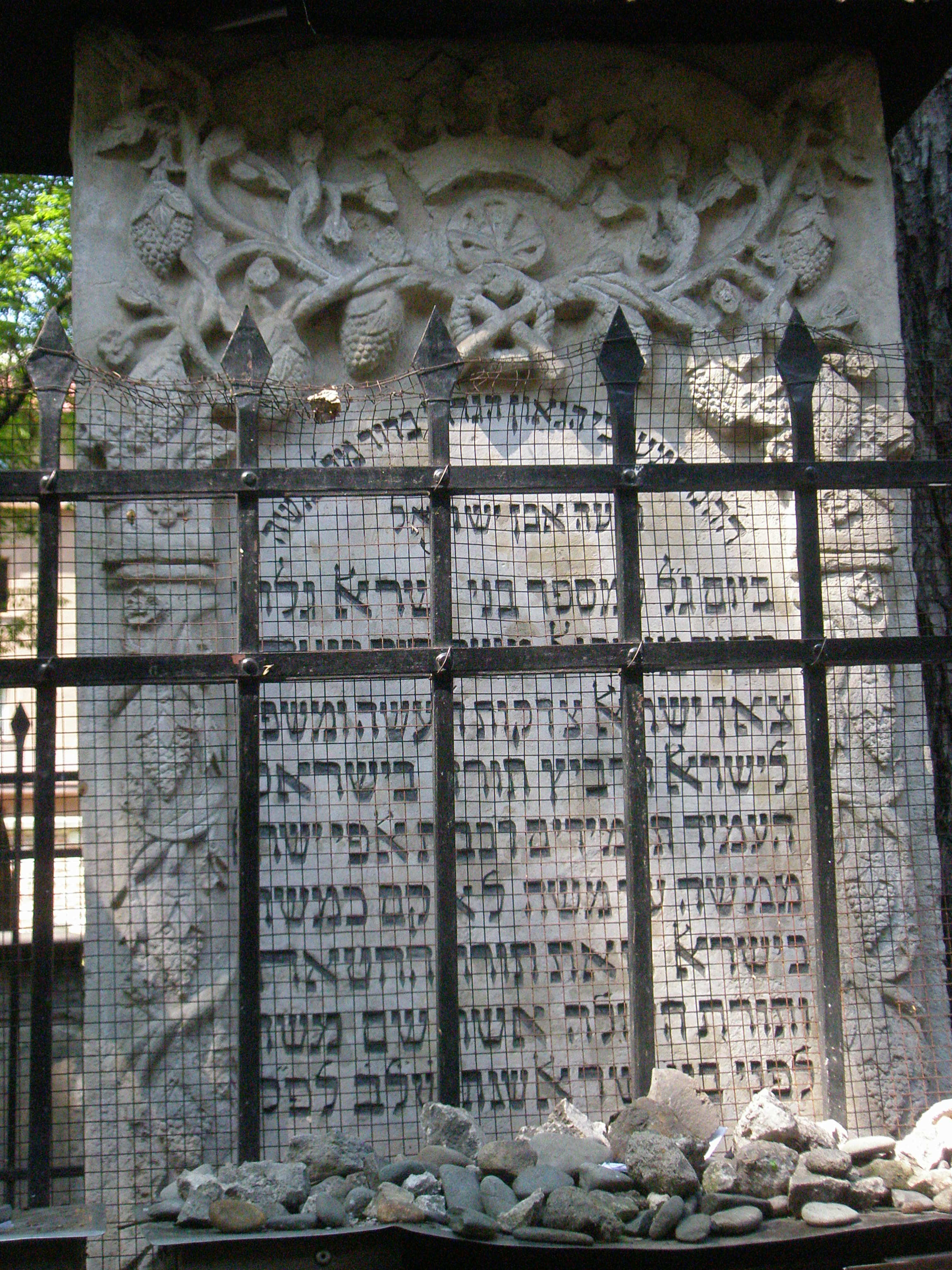
The Rema's tombstone at the Remuh Cemetery, Kraków

Isserles is perhaps best known for his halakhic works, chief among them are his glosses to the Shulchan Aruch by Yosef Karo. He is noted for his approach to customs (minhagim): "it should be remembered that R. Isserles did not regard the Jewish minhag lightly. On the contrary, he too expressed reverence and respect for it, and whenever possible endeavored to uphold it and also to explain its origin. Only, unlike many great Talmudic scholars, he refused to follow it blindly. When convinced of the unsound basis of a minhag, he was ready to repudiate it regardless of its acceptance by the people."

Furthermore: "The Talmud is, of course, the great reservoir to which R. Isserles turns as the first step in attempting to solve a problem. The question at hand is immediately referred to an identical or similar case in the Talmud. The second step is the weighing of the opinions of the ראשונים, i.e. Alfasi (רי״ף), Tosafists, Nachmanides, etc. expanding and explaining the text. The opinion of the majority is followed by R. Isserles and even Maimonides, whom he respected very highly, is disregarded if he was in the minority. After the Rishonim, R. Isserles proceeds to examine writings of אחרונים, i.e. Mordechai, Ashri and Tur, and the latter is followed especially when the Tosafists agree with him. At this point, the Responsa of still later authorities are cited extensively in accordance with the well-established principle of הלכה כבתרא, paying due attention even to the opinions of contemporaries and to customs of Polish Jewry which the ב״י omitted. Thus, Isserles, in his responsa as well as in the ד״מ and his commentary on the Shulchan Aruch, served as a supplement and offered his community the code of Law adjusted to its authorities, customs, and needs. He spread the "cloth" over the table prepared by his contemporary, the ב״י."

Isserles, like Yosef Karo in the Shulchan Aruch, often quotes Kabbalistic sources and opinions in his various works, and writes of his great joy upon finding that his ruling concurred with what he later found written in the "words of the Zohar which were given at Sinai...".

Writing to a friend who had become a rabbi in Germany, Isserles expressed his preference for living in Poland over Germany: "You would be better off living with us in Poland on stale bread if need be, but safe".

Isserles was criticized by his contemporaries for studying philosophy, but defended himself by arguing that Aristotle had learned from Solomon and Socrates from Ahitophel and Assaf ha-Karki, citing Meir Aldabi.

== Works ==
Isserles is renowned for his fundamental work of Halakha (Jewish law), entitled ha-Mapah (lit., "the tablecloth"), an inline commentary on the Shulchan Aruch (lit. "the set table"), upon which his "great reputation as a halakist and codifier rests chiefly."

=== Darkhei Moshe ===
Darkhei Moshe (דרכי משה) is a commentary on the Tur as well as on the Beth Yosef, which is Yosef Karo's commentary on the Tur and the work underlying the Shulkhan Aruch. Isserles had originally intended the Darkhei Moshe to serve as a basis for subsequent halakhic decisions. As such, in this work he evaluates the rulings of the Tur—which was widely accepted among the Ashkenazim and Sephardim—comparing these with rulings of other halakhic authorities. The Beth Yosef was published while Isserles was at work on the Darkhei Moshe. Recognizing that Karo's commentary largely met his objectives, Isserles published the Darkhei Moshe in a modified form. "In publishing the דרכי משה, R. Isserles rendered a great service to Ashkenazic Jewry, for he reestablished its Talmudic authorities as the deciding factor in determining a law." An abridgement of the original work is published with the Tur; the complete version of the Darkhei Moshe is published separately.

=== HaMapah ===
HaMapah (המפה) is written as a gloss to the Shulchan Aruch of Yosef Karo, discussing cases where Sephardi and Ashkenazi customs differ. Hamapah is the "tablecloth" for the Shulkhan Aruch, the "set table". Karo had based his normative positions on three authorities: Maimonides, Asher ben Jehiel (the Rosh), and Isaac Alfasi (the Rif). Of these, only Asher ben Jehiel had non-Sephardic roots, having lived most of his life in Germany before moving to Spain, but even so, his work is largely Sephardic in orientation. Isserles thus created a series of glosses, in which he supplemented Karo with material drawn from the laws and customs (Minhagim) of Ashkenazi Jewry, chiefly based on the works of Yaakov Moelin, Israel Isserlein and Israel Bruna.

All editions of the Shulchan Aruch since 1578 include HaMapah embedded in the text (introduced by the word: הגה Hagahah, meaning "gloss"), and distinguished by a semi-cursive "Rashi script". Isserles' HaMapah was "considered to be an interpretation and supplement to Karo's work, while also challenging its claim to universal authority by introducing Ashkenazic traditions and customs that differed from the Sephardic ones. Rather than challenge the status of the Shulhan ‘Arukh, however, Isserles established the status of the Shulhan ‘Arukh as the authoritative text. In most of the editions since 1574, the Shulhan ‘Arukh was printed with HaMapah, thus creating an interesting tension that was realized on the printed page. It was an act of integrating the Sephardic tradition and its accommodation into the Ashkenazi world, the confirmation of the authority and its undermining appearing on the same page."

The citations "indicating the sources in earlier authorities of the decisions in the annotations to the Shulchan Aruch, were not placed by Isserles. This may be seen from the fact that many times incorrect references are given. An anonymous scholar placed them at the end of each comment and gradually they have been mistaken as being indications of the author himself."

Isserles' weaving "his comments into the main text as glosses, indicates, besides upholding the traditional Ashkenazi attitude to a text, that the work itself, meant to serve as a textbook for laymen, had been accepted in Rema's yeshivah at Krakow as a students' reference book. Instead of the Arba‘ah Turim, the main text for the study of posekim in the Ashkenazi yeshivah up to Rema's day, he chose to use the new book, which was free of accumulated layers of glosses and emendations, up-to-date and lucid, and arranged along the same lines as the old Turim so that it could easily be introduced into the yeshivah curriculum. This was the crucial step in altering the canonical status of the Shulhan Arukh."

Today, the term "Shulchan Aruch" refers to the combined work of Karo and Isserles. This consolidation of the two works strengthened the underlying unity of the Sephardi and Ashkenazi communities. It is through this unification that the Shulkhan Aruch became the universally accepted Code of Law for the entire Jewish people, with the notable exception of Yemenite Jews who still follow the Rambam (Maimonides).

=== Torat Ha-Olah ===
Torat Ha-Olah (תורת העלה), written between 1560 and 1570, was a discussion of the deeper meaning of the Temple in Jerusalem and the temple sacrifices. In addition to discussing the principles of the Jewish faith invoked, Isserles connects the Torah laws and symbols to philosophy, physics, astronomy, and Kabbalah. The title translates into the "Law of the Burnt-Offering." In addition to citing the Tanakh and Talmud, Isserles heavily references the Midrash.

== Ancestry ==
Ancestors of Moses Isserles

Haim Henschel Isserles
Josef Isserles
Shaindel Goldman
Israel Isserles
Moses Auerbach
Gittel Auerbach
Mushkat Isserles
Moses Isserles
Nachman Shrentzel
Eliezer Lipmann Schrentzel
Royzu Eberles
Dinah Malka Schrentzel
Yechiel Yehuda Luria
Dreizel Miriam Zeisel Luria
Malka Lifshitz

== Published works ==
- Shulchan Aruch Archives – Orach Chayim , Torah.org
- Shulchan Aruch Archives – Yoreh De'ah, Torah.org
- Torath ha-Olah fulltext (PDF, Hebrew)

=== Other works ===
Isserles also wrote:

- Torath ha-Chatath, a legal guidebook focusing primarily on Jewish dietary laws
- Torath ha-Olah, an in-depth philosophical explanation of the significance of the Temple in Jerusalem and of its rites
- Mechir Yayin, a commentary on the Book of Esther
- Teshuvot Rema, a collection of responsa – see History of Responsa: Sixteenth century
- Aderes Eliyahu, a commentary on zohar, of which remains only on Bereshis, published by his student Eliyahu of Loanz
