= Darkhei Moshe (book) =

Jewish religious book by Moses Isserles

- Author: Moses Isserles
- Language: Hebrew
- Subject: Halacha

Darkhei Moshe (Hebrew: דרכי משה) is a commentary of the book Arba'ah Turim and the Beit Yosef, which is also a commentary on the Tur. Darkhei Moshe was written by the Polish Ashkenazi Rabbi Moses Isserles (1530–1572, both in Kraków).

The Arba Turim is one of the sources that Rabbi Joseph Karo used to write the Shulchan Aruch, the code of the Jewish law (the halacha), a book accepted and studied worldwide by the majority of orthodox Jews. Isserles initially wanted that his book served as a base for latter legal rabbinical decisions.

His work evaluate the regulations of the Tur, a book that was widely accepted for both ashkenazi and sephardic Jews, and he compared these regulations with the rulings of the rabbinical authorities in the matters related with halacha.

The Beit Yossef was published while Rabbi Isserles was working yet in his work, the Darkhei Moshe. Knowing that the work of Rabbi Karo had reached widely its goals, Isserles published his work in a new modified format.

When he published his book, Rabbi Isserles offered a service to Ashkenazi jewry, for he relied on the rulings of the Ashkenazi rabbinical authorities. A summary of the original work was published together with the Tur; the complete version of the Darkhei Moshe was published separately.
