= Mateh Moshe =

1591 halakhic work by Moshe Met

- מטה משה

Information
- Religion: Judaism
- Author: Rabbi Moshe Met, Moshe ben Avraham of Przemyśl
- Language: Hebrew
- Period: 1591

Mateh Moshe (Hebrew: מטה משה, "Staff of Moses") is a highly cited halakhic (legal) work by Rabbi Moshe Met, Moshe ben Avraham of Przemyśl; it contains, also, moralistic aggadic teachings. As Rabbi Moshe is best known for this work, he is often referred to as "the Mateh Moshe". It was published in Kraków in 1591; in Frankfurt in 1726, with the addition of explanatory notes; a 1958 edition with sources and an introduction, edited in London and published in Jerusalem; and a modernized version in Jerusalem in 2010, incorporating several of the preceding features.

Mateh Moshe particularly emphasizes the religious customs of Polish Jewry. It draws on the teachings of Maharshal, Met's primary teacher, as well as numerous other works, not always named, combining these, so as to discuss one's duties in this world, from both a halakhic and aggadic perspective. It comprises three "pillars", corresponding to those delineated in Pirkei Avot 1:2:

- Torah: Teachings and demands due to the Torah (דרושים למעלת התורה); this section, often reprinted in other works
- Avodah, the "service of God": expanding on laws in the Orach Chayim section of Shulchan Aruch
- Gemilut Hasidim, acts of kindness: expanding on Yoreh Deah
