= Jabali Afrika =

Kenyan musical band

- Origin: Kenya
- Genres: Afro-Rock
- Years active: 1990s–present
- Members: Justo Asikoye; Joseck Asikoye
- Past members: Stephen Wafula, Robert Owino, Peter Mbole, Victor Tsavani Elolo, Evans Jumba
- Website: jabaliafrika.com

Jabali Afrika is a band formed in Nairobi, Kenya by former members of the Kenyan National Theatre. The band was founded by brothers Justo and Joseck Asikoye, and Victor Elolo, Evan Jumba, and Robert Owino, Peter Mbole, Stephen Wafula, Bernard kapima joining the band later. The band is known for its fusion of rock, reggae, and African percussion. Jabali Afrika got nominated with all one tribe collection for the 2022 Grammy awards for best children’s music category.

== Influences and musical style ==
Inspiration for Jabali Afrika's original musical style came from Fundi Konde and George Mukabi, and the band incorporates customary instruments such as the Mbumbumbu bass drums, the sikuti drum and chivoti flute. Over the years, the band's sound has evolved to incorporate influences from the Grateful Dead, Peter Tosh, Bob Marley, Ladysmith Black Mambazo, Lucky Dube and Fela Kuti. The band has also collaborated with several artists including Samba Mapangala, Don cameron, An Vedi, lois mutua and Antonio Carmona of Ketama. Interview Tsavani Victor

== History ==
Jabali Afrika began in the early '90s, composed of dancers, singers, and drummers from the Kenyan National Theatre. The band chose its name from the Kiswahili word for "rock," jabali, and included Afrika as a reminder of its heritage. Initially performing traditional Kenyan songs, the group gained the attention of the Kenyan National Talent Search, leading to international tours organized by African Heritage. The band would soon arrive in the United States and based itself in the Pittsburgh region. In 1996, the band gained attention by appearing in an episode of Mr. Rogers' Neighborhood, performing the song "Tree, Tree, Tree".

== Discography ==
Studio albums

- Journey (1996)
- Remember the Past (1999)
- Rootsganza (2001)
- Mayosi (2005)
- Rebellion 1963 To The Future (2014)
- Nakumbuka (2017)
- Hesabu Moja Mbili (2017)
- Khusaire (2020)
- Kings and Queens (2023)
