= Israel ben Josef =

Jewish merchant, banker, and Talmudist

Rabbi Israel ben Josef ישראל בן יוסף

Personal life
- Born: c. 1490s–1500 Regensburg, Holy Roman Empire
- Died: 18 February 1568 Kraków, Kingdom of Poland
- Spouse: Dinah Malka Schrentzel
- Children: Eliyahu; Yitzhak; Joseph; Kendel; Moses; Miriam Beila; Eliezer; Sheindel
- Parent(s): Yosef ben Chaim; Gittel Auerbach
- Occupation: Merchant, banker, Talmudist, Head of the Community, Rabbi of Krakow

Religious life
- Religion: Judaism

Israel (Isserl) ben Josef (around 1500 – 1568) was a wealthy Jewish merchant, banker, and Talmudist who settled in Kraków in 1519, following the expulsion of the Jews from the German city of Regensburg. He was the father of Moses Isserles and the founder of the Remah Synagogue in Kazimierz, now a district of Kraków, built in 1553 on land owned by Israel ben Josef.

According to popular tradition, he was the founder of the Remah Synagogue, built in 1553 on land owned by him. According to The Jewish Encyclopedia, it may be concluded from the terms which his son applies to him in his preface to "Meḥir Yayin" that he was the chief of the community.

== Remah Synagogue ==
According to one popular tradition, Israel founded the synagogue in honor of his son Moses, who already in his youth was famed for his erudition. However, the Hebrew inscription of the foundation tablet reads: "Husband, R. Israel, son of Josef of blessed memory, bound in strength, to the glory of the Eternal One, and of his wife Malka, daughter of Eleazar, let her soul be received among the living, built this synagogue, the house of the Lord, from her bequest. Lord restore the treasure of Israel", implying that the synagogue was built in memory of Israel's wife, Malka (died 1552).

== Legend ==
Israel was careful to never engage in business on Fridays after midday due to the Jewish law of refraining from work on the Sabbath. According to legend, it was in this merit that he was awarded from Heaven to have such an illustrious son.
