= Abiathar ben Elijah ha-Cohen =

Palestinian Gaon (c. 1040–1112)

Abiathar ben Elijah ha-Cohen (Hebrew: אביתר בן אליהו הכהן; c. 1040 – 1112) was the last Palestinian Gaon to occupy his position in the land of Israel. He succeeded his father Rabbi Elijah to the gaonate in 1083. He was deposed for a period following a violent quarrel with the Egyptian exilarch David ben Daniel who aspired to dominate Palestinian Jewry. After having fled to Syria in 1093, he later returned to his position following the fall of David ben Daniel. An account of these events was discovered in the Cairo Genizah, known as Megillat Abiathar. Abiathar was stranded during the Siege of Tripoli and seems to have only found safe passage to Damascus because of his privileged status. He is the author of Megillat Evyatar in 1094, a work of memorialized history that discusses the selection of Jewish leadership and the authority for the process of proclaiming the official calendar.

Jewish titles
Preceded by Elijah ben Solomon ha-Cohen	Gaon of Palestine; Abiathar ben Elijah ha-Cohen; 1083–c.1109	Succeeded by Solomon ben Elijah ha-Cohen
