= Remah Synagogue =

Orthodox synagogue in Kraków, Poland

- Synagoga Remuh
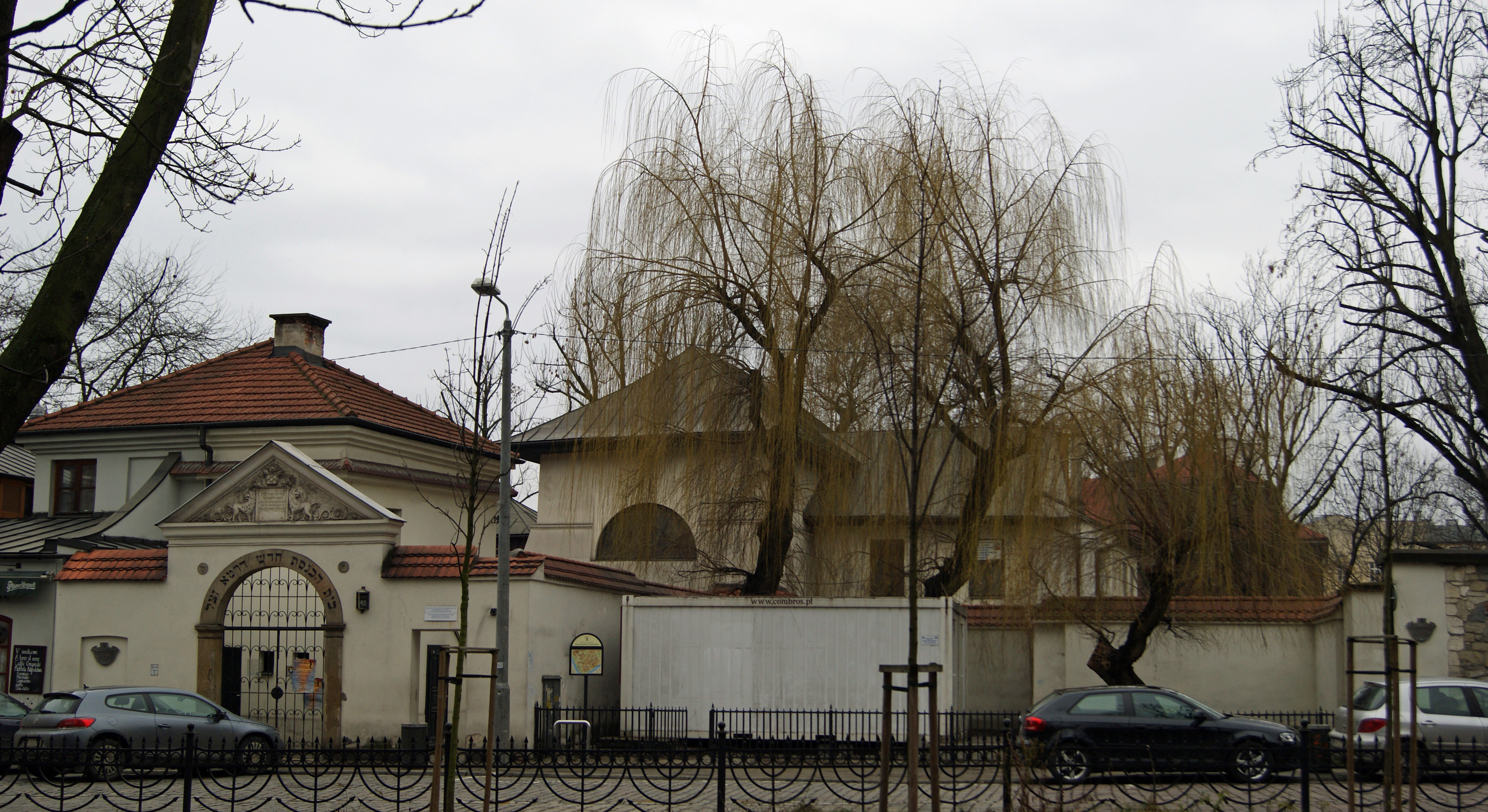
- The synagogue in 2012

Religion
- Affiliation: Orthodox Judaism
- Rite: Nusach Ashkenaz
- Ecclesiastical or organizational status: Synagogue
- Leadership: Rabbi Boaz Gadka
- Status: Active

Location
- Location: 40 Szeroka Street; Kraków Kazimierz
- Country: Poland
- Interactive map of Remah Synagogue
- Coordinates: 50°03′09.5″N 19°56′50.3″E

Architecture
- Architect: Stanisław Baranek
- Type: Synagogue architecture
- Style: Renaissance; Art Nouveau
- Completed: 1557
- Materials: Stone

UNESCO World Heritage Site
- Type: Cultural
- Criteria: iv
- Designated: 1978
- Part of: Historic Centre of Kraków
- Reference no.: 29
- Region: Europe and North America

Historic Monument of Poland
- Designated: 1994-09-08
- Part of: Kraków historical city complex
- Reference no.: M.P. 1994 nr 50 poz. 418

The Remah Synagogue (Polish: Synagoga Remu), is an Orthodox Jewish congregation and synagogue, located at 40 Szeroka Street, in the historic Kazimierz district of Kraków, in the Lesser Poland Voivodeship of Poland.

Designed by Stanisław Baranek in the Renaissance and Art Nouveau styles and completed in 1557, the synagogue is named in honor of Rabbi Moses Isserles, known by the Hebrew acronym ReMA (רמ״א, pronounced RaMUH) who's famed for writing a collection of commentaries and additions that complement Rabbi Yosef Karo's Shulchan Aruch.

== History ==
=== Origins ===
According to one popular tradition Israel ben Josef, the grandson of Moshe Auerbach of Regensburg, founded the synagogue in honor of his son Moshe Isserles, who already in his youth was famed for his erudition. A more plausible motive for the synagogue's origin stems from the Hebrew inscription on the foundation tablet that reads:

Husband, Reb Israel, son of Josef of blessed memory, bound in strength, to the glory of the Eternal One, and of his wife Malka, daughter of Eleazar, may her soul be bound up in the portion of life, built this synagogue, the house of the Lord, from her bequest. Lord restore the treasure of Israel.

This implies that the synagogue was built in memory of Malka, the wife of Israel ben Josef. The year 1552 was a very difficult time for the family of Israel: his mother, wife, and daughter-in-law, the first wife of Rabbi Moshe Isserles, and probably other family members died in the epidemic that hit Kraków that year, in addition to numerous Jewish inhabitants of Kazimierz. Israel ben Josef was a wealthy banker who settled in Kraków only in 1519, following the expulsion of Jews from the German city of Regensburg. Another tradition maintains that the synagogue was founded by Rabbi Moshe Isserles himself in memory of first wife Golda, who died at the age of twenty.

=== Construction ===
The Remah Synagogue was built in Kazimierz, then a suburban village outside Kraków, located on the right bank of the Vistula River, immediately to the south of the Royal Castle on the Wawel Hill. Kazimierz had a Jewish community since the late 15th century, transferred from the budding Old Town by King John I Albert following a fire in 1495. It soon became the main Jewish neighborhood in the region and one of the largest Jewish communities in Poland. Originally called the "New Synagogue" to distinguish it from the Old Synagogue, (Stara Bożnica), the Remah Synagogue was built in 1553 at the edge of a newly established Jewish cemetery (today known as the "Old Cemetery") on land owned by Israel ben Josef. This date is stated clearly on the foundation tablet. Nevertheless, the royal permission by King Sigismund II Augustus of Poland was obtained in November 1556, after long opposition from the Church. As it is hard to believe that the construction actually began without the royal permission, the inscription should therefore be understood as possibly referring to the date when the decision to build a second synagogue in Kazimierz was taken by its founder. The first building of the synagogue, probably a wooden structure, was destroyed in a fire in April 1557, but following a new permission granted by King Sigismund II Augustus, a second building of masonry was erected in place in 1557 after the plans of Stanisław Baranek, a Kraków architect. The original late Renaissance style edifice underwent a number of changes during the 17th and the 18th centuries. The current building traces its design to the restoration work of 1829, to which some technical improvements were introduced during the restoration of 1933 conducted under the supervision of the architect Herman Gutman.

During the Holocaust, the synagogue was sequestered by the German Trust Office (Treuhandstelle) and served as a storehouse of firefighting equipment, having been despoiled of its valuable ceremonial objects and historic furbishing, including the bimah. However, the building itself was not destroyed. In 1957, thanks to the efforts of the local Jewish community and of Akiva Kahane, the Joint Distribution Committee representative in Poland, the Remah Synagogue underwent a major restoration that reestablished much of the pre-war appearance of the interior.

== Interior ==
The entrance to the synagogue courtyard is located at 40 Szeroka Street (previously also known as Main Street) at the heart of the historic Jewish quarter of Kazimierz. Above the gate is an arch with the Hebrew inscription: "The new synagogue of the ReMA, of blessed memory” The courtyard walls carry inscriptions in memory of the Jews of Kraków murdered in the Holocaust. The main room of the synagogue is accessed through a small entrance hall on the north side of the building next to a separate entrance to the women's section. It has white painted limestone walls with large round headed windows in the north and south sides and lunettes on the east and west sides. A number of chandeliers, some standing, and others hanging from the ceiling contribute to the bright and airy atmosphere of the interior.

The prayer hall features a centrally situated rectangular bimah with a reconstructed wrought-iron enclosure that has two entrances, one displaying an 18th-century polychrome double door coming from a destroyed synagogue outside Kraków. The bimah door is decorated with a crowned menorah in gilded bas-reliefs whose style appears to have been inspired by the popular art of the region. The late Renaissance style Holy Ark has an Art Nouveau door, above which there are Hebrew inscriptions from the Bible. Although the synagogue has been rebuilt many times, this is the original feature, carved in 1558. A ner tamid with the Hebrew inscription "An eternal flame for the soul of ReMA, of blessed memory" is situated at the left side of the Holy Ark, while at its right a reconstructed plaque commemorates the place where Rabbi Moshe Isserles used to pray. One of the chairs on the eastern wall is reserved in his honor. The foundation tablet has been preserved near the southern wall. A clock presented by Chaim Herzog, the sixth President of Israel, during his visit to the synagogue in 1992 is one of the latest additions. The women's section was originally located on the first floor of a wooden structure connected to the northern wall of the synagogue. It has since undergone major restorations and the present women's gallery is adjacent to the northern wall of the praying hall.

The Remah Cemetery is located next to the synagogue.

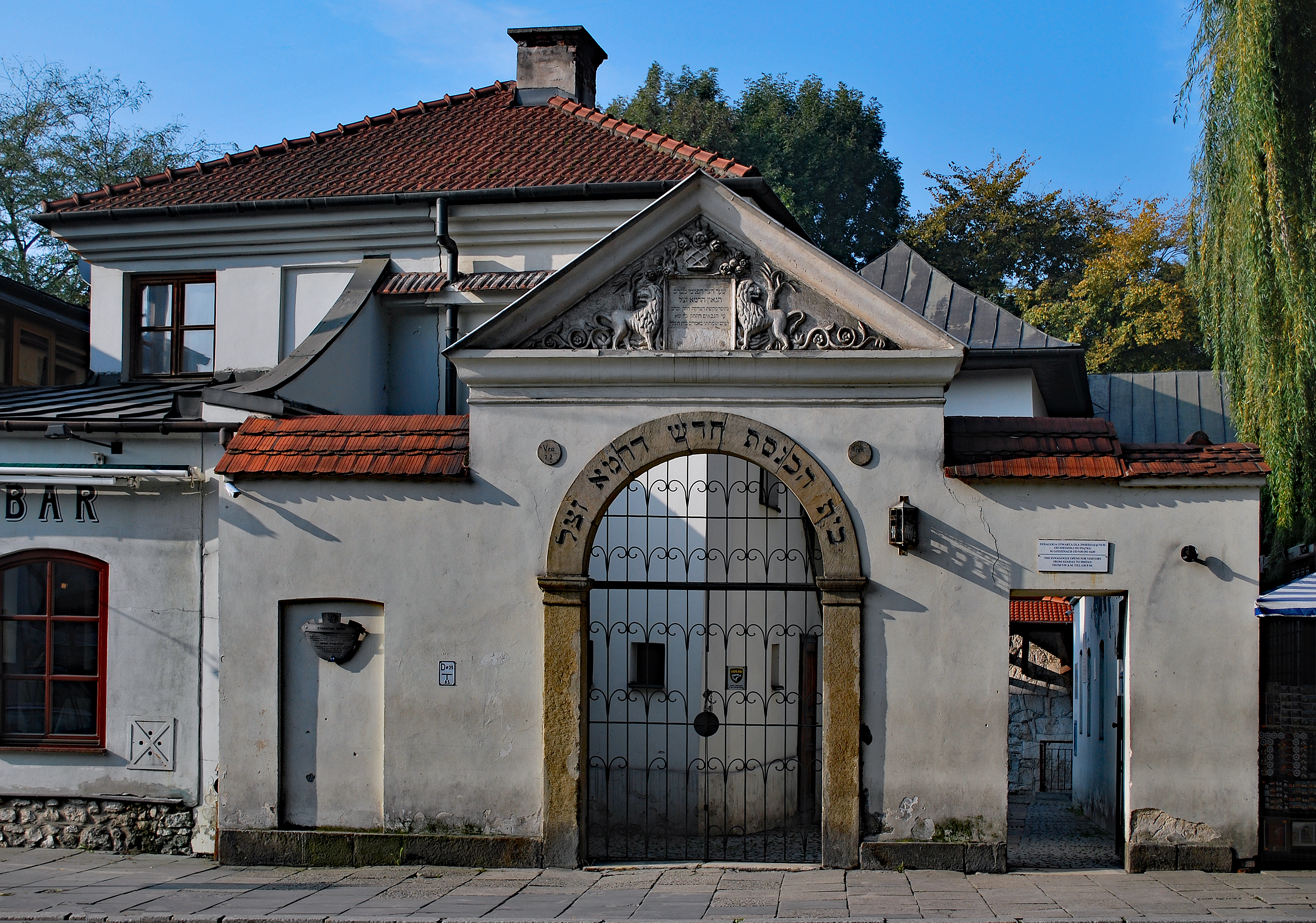
Gate to the synagogue and cemetery

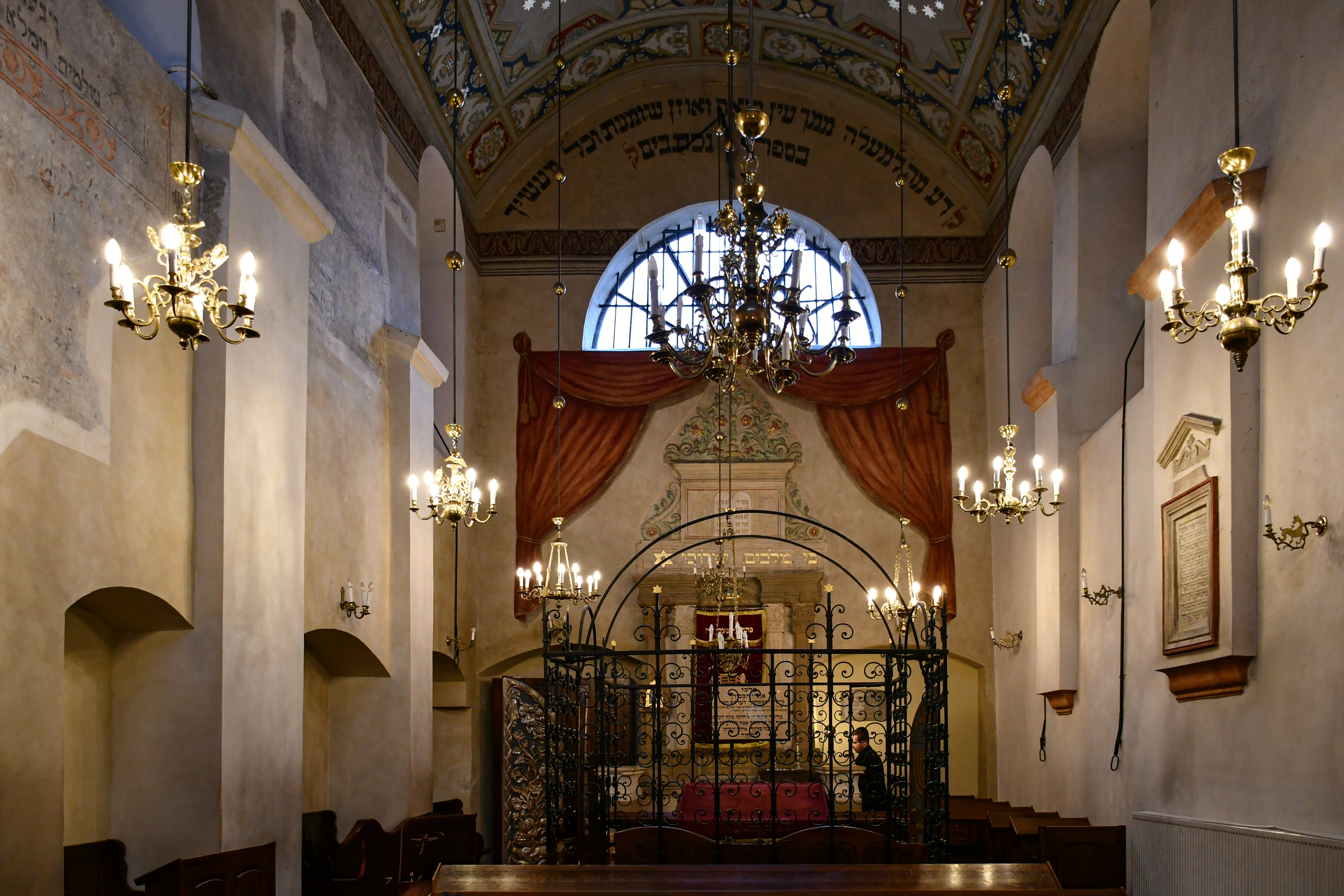
Interior of the synagogue

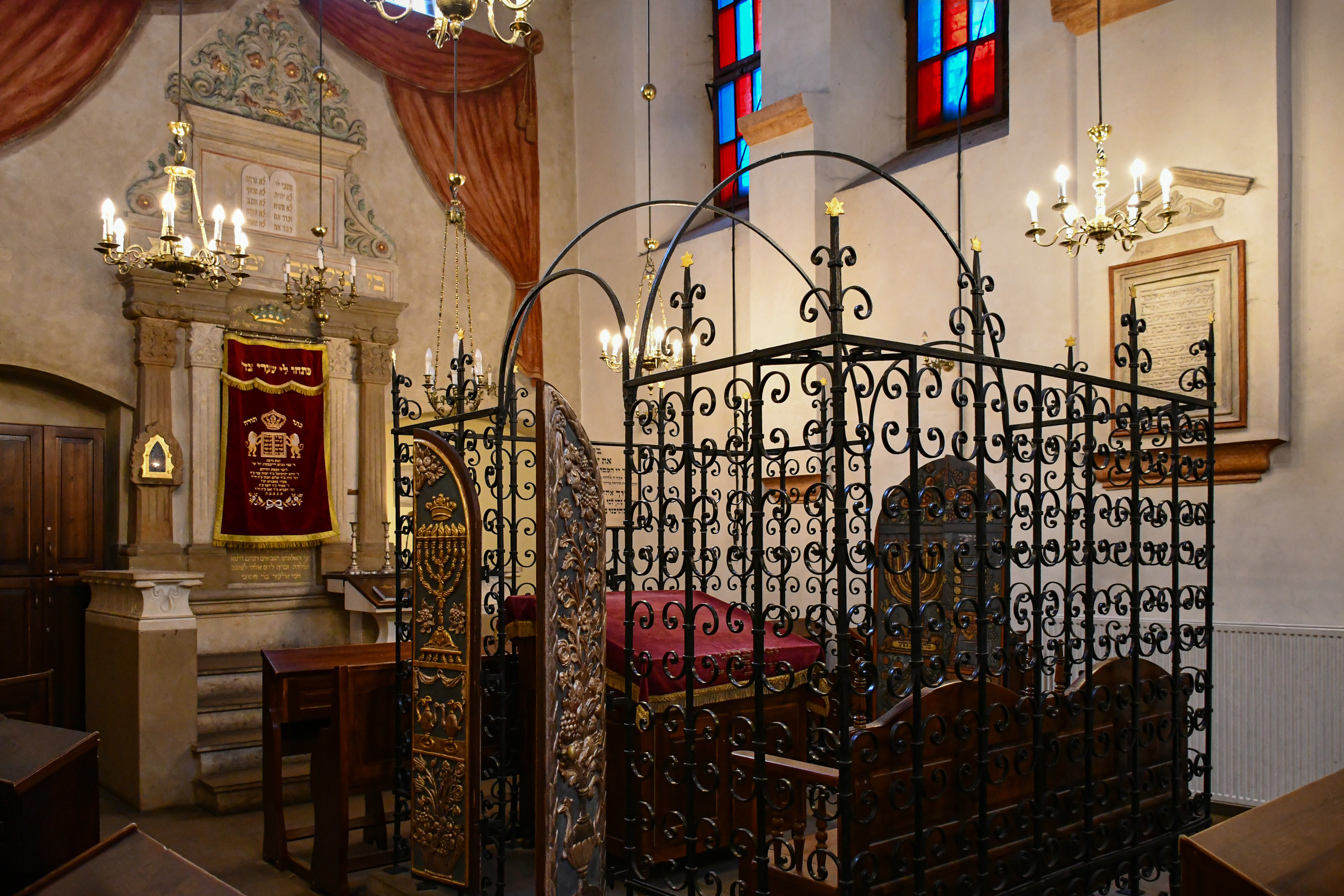
Bema and Torah ark (Aron ha-Kodesh)

== See also ==
- Chronology of Jewish Polish history
- Culture of Kraków
- History of the Jews in Poland
- List of active synagogues in Poland
- Synagogues of Kraków
