= Anastasia Vedyakova =

Russian composer

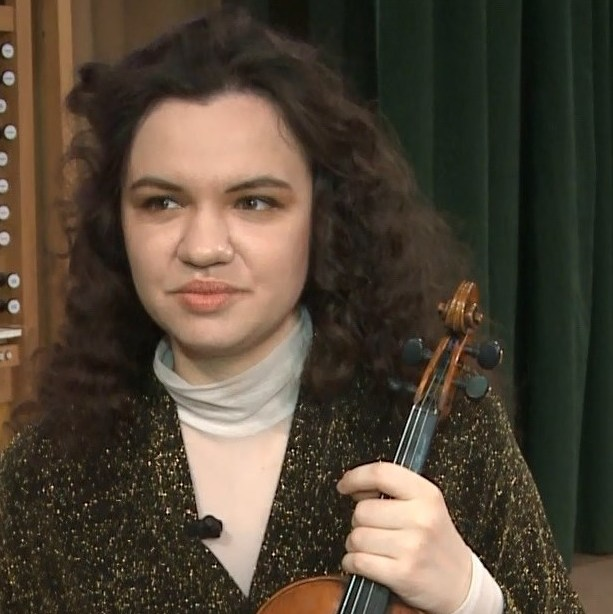
- Born: 1991 (age 34–35)
- Other names: Anastasia Vediakova, Anastasia Vediakova, An Vedi
- Education: Moscow State Tchaikovsky Conservatory
- Occupations: composer, violinist, conductor, singer-songwriter
- Musical career
- Labels: Naxos, Sony Music, Ditto Music, Tunecore
- Website: https://www.anvedi.org/

Anastasia Vedyakova (born 1991) is a violinist, composer and conductor. She is the Soloist of the Philharmonic, member of BMI, the National Union of Composers, the Boston New Music Initiative, the Recording Academy, International Society for Jazz Arrangers and Composers, the International Association for Music and Medicine, Union of Russian Artists, International Conductors Guild and other organizations. She is the only Russian holder of the Elgar Medal. She is the winner and nominee for more than 50 international music awards as a violinist, composer, conductor and singer-songwriter, and also a Grammy nominated and balloted artist . Top artist at the People's Artist under patronage of Johnny Depp.

== Professional Activities ==
Anastasia Vedyakova was born in 1991 and she began to play the violin when she was four. By 1998 she was welcomed into the Central Music School and the Moscow State Tchaikovsky Conservatory, where she studied with Prof. E. Grach, V. Pikaizen and Prof. A.Koblyakov. She graduated with honours from the conservatory in 2014. Then she studied at the Contemporary Classical Music Department till 2017 when she has become a Soloist at the Philharmonic. September 2022, Anastasia received a diploma as a conductor and joined the International Conductors Guild (the US) as the Member. Currently, Anastasia Vedyakova is a trainee conductor at the St. Petersburg Conservatory, class of Professor Leonid Korchmar, and also a student in the course of Markand Thakar.

She has won 20 awards as a conductor, including the King's Peak International Music Competition (2023), Brahms International Competition . She's also the Laureate at the London Classical Music Competition as a classical vocalist (contralto), II Prix laureate at the competition «Vocal City» (France, 2024), III prize laureate at the «Voice Premium» competition (Belarus, 2023), II prize laureate at the «VoicePemium» 2025.

She was a fellow of the Rostropovich Foundation.

Vedyakova was nominated as "Musician of the Year" for the Josie Music Awards in 2021, 2024, nominated for "Vocal Event of the Year" in 2023, and nominated for "Artist of the Year" (team Jabali Afrika) in 2024 . Vedyakova was the only composer from Russia as a participant of KLK New Music, the winner of "The 6th International Composers' Competition for the 6th International Wind/Percussion Competition".

She takes part in international music and music therapy conferences, and publishes articles as a musicologist.

The American Friction Quartet was the first ensemble to record her "Mirage".

In February 2022, Vedyakova and organist Anastasia Bykova performed the world premiere of a work by Grammy-nominated composer Nadeem Majdalany, which he composed especially for the duet; there were also six Russian premieres of works by such composers as Danaë Xanthe Vlasse, Thomas Nazziola, John Finbury, Sherban Nichifor and Antoine Auberson.

In March 2022, she won Rome Music Video Awards for her Sonata "A War Zone". April 2022, Anastasia won 3 Gold and 1 Silver One Earth Awards for her music. She is also the winner on the 14th season of the One Earth Awards .

On August 12, 2022, she released her eighth album ConTempoRary Violin, featuring music by J. S. Bach and five living composers from five countries.

August 2022, Anastasia and the great-great-grandson of the famous composer Reinhold Gliere won Euro Music Video Awards for their work "The Music of Our Victory".

August 2022, Anastasia won ISSA International Rising Star Awards and the Red Carpet Award Show in Holland Best Female Musician of the Year.

On September 10, 2022, the album It Arrives by Iranian composer Mehdi Rajabian was released. Anastasia performed the lead violin on this album.

In 2023, she won the Viktor Kalabis Prize at the Ruzikova Composition Competition .

Anastasia is the nominee at the Wavy Awards for her album "ConTempoRary Violin" , finalist at the ISSA Awards 2024 , I place winner at the competition "Inspiration" as a conductor and other awards.

She is the featured artist on such impactful releases as the album "Kings and Queens" by Justo Asikoye (member of Jabali Afrika) Produced by Mehdi Rajabian, "Love and Peace" by Prem Murti (co-author of Grammy winning album "Divine Tides" along with Ricky Kej), "Kaatrin Mozhi (Revisited)" by Devan Ekambaram and Rita Thyagarajan.

Anastasia Vedyakova collaborates with Studio for New Music as a composer and conductor.

She has an official registered artist's alias.

She is the featured artist at such radio stations like LDM Music , Museboat , Banks Radio Australia, New In Music , BuzzS , Izilion , Louder Than the Music

Anastasia often takes part in international conferences for musicologists such as the "Stanislavsky and the Musical Theater" , New Music of the Post-Soviet Space , Nikolay Golovanov and modern ways of development of sacred music ,

Anastasia Vedyakova is a jury member at the LIT Talent Awards , Charleston International Music Competition , International S. Slonimsky Competition , International S.Orlov Competition , World Online Music Competitions Organization

In 2024, Anastasia Vedyakova was awarded the Medal of Merit for Science and Education (France).

November 2024, the album ”The Fury” by Antonio Vergara, for whom Anastasia recorded her violin, became Grammy(r) nominated in the category ”Best Contemporary Blues Album”.

In 2025-2026 she has won and been nominated for multiple prestigious awards as a violinist, composer, songwriter, filmmaker, actress, visual artist in the US, Canada, Europe and Asia.

On July 2026, An Vedi wins the IndieFEST Film Awards, being the only filmmaker from Russia. The rest of winners include OSCARS®, BAFTA and EMMY® winning and nominated filmmakers and actors.

== Performances ==
She is the first performer of the music by Jan Tamzejian, Tayren Ben-Abraham, Jay Reise, Colette Mourey, András Derecskei, Nadeem Majdalany, Wajdi About Diab, Faraj Garayev.

2019, she had a solo recital together with Simon Smith during the Saint-Petersburg International Cultural Forum.

Vedyakova has given performances at the Moscow Conservatory halls, Zaryadye Hall, and the Evangelical Lutheran Cathedral.

The performers of her music are Erica Sinclair (UK) , Duo Diversitas .

She is the first performer of the works by Nikolai Manasewitch.

In 2024, Anastasia Vedyakova toured the cities of Russia and Azerbaijan.

January 2026, Anastasia Vedyakova has been conducting with her orchestra the first performance of the oratorio "Saint Ludmila" by Antonín Dvořák in Russia.
