= Moses ben Abraham =

Moses ben Abraham or Moshe ben Avraham may refer to:

- Moses ben Abraham of Pontoise (12th century), French tosafist
- Moses ben Abraham (fl. 1244), French author
- Moses ben Abraham Darʿī (13th century), Karaite poet and physician, namesake of the Moussa Dar'i Synagogue
- Moses ben Abraham of Nîmes (fl. 1462), Provençal poet and astronomer (see List of medieval Hebrew astronomers)
- Moses ben Abraham Bali (fl. 1489), Egyptian Karaite physician and poet
- Moses ben Abraham Provençal (1503–1576), Italian mathematician and Hebrew grammarian
- Moshe ben Avraham of Przemyśl (died 1606), Galitzian rabbi
- Zhao Yingcheng (born 1619), Hebrew name Moshe ben Avraham, Chinese philosopher
- Moses ben Abraham ha-Ḳadosh (died 1681), called MiGeza Tz'vi, Lithuanian rabbi (see List of Hebrew abbreviations)
- Moses ben Avraham Avinu (died c. 1733), Czech printer and author
- Moses ben Abraham Israel (died 1803), chief rabbi of Alexandria
