= Solomon Luria =

Ashkenazi rabbi and halakhist (1510–1573)

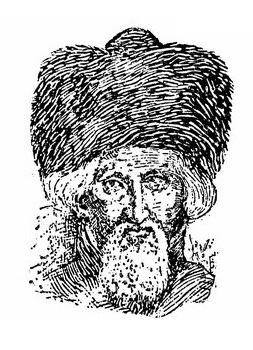
- Portrait attributed to Solomon Luria

Personal life
- Born: 1510 Brześć, Grand Duchy of Lithuania
- Died: November 7, 1573 (aged 63) Lublin, Polish–Lithuanian Commonwealth
- Buried: Lublin, Poland
- Occupation: Talmudist, halakhist, biblical commentator

Religious life
- Religion: Judaism

Shlomo Luria (Hebrew: שלמה לוריא; 1510 – November 7, 1573) was one of the great Ashkenazi Jewish poskim (decisors of Jewish law) and teachers of the sixteenth century. He is known for his work of Halakha titled Yam Shel Shlomo (ים של שלמה, 'Sea of Solomon') and his Talmud commentary Chochmat Shlomo (pronounced [/χoxˈmat ʃloˈmo/]; חכמת שלמה, 'Wisdom [of] Solomon'). Luria is often referred to as "Maharshal" מהרש״ל (a Hebrew abbreviation for "Our Teacher, Rabbi Solomon Luria") or "Rashal" רש״ל (an abbreviation for "Rabbi Solomon Luria").

== Biography ==
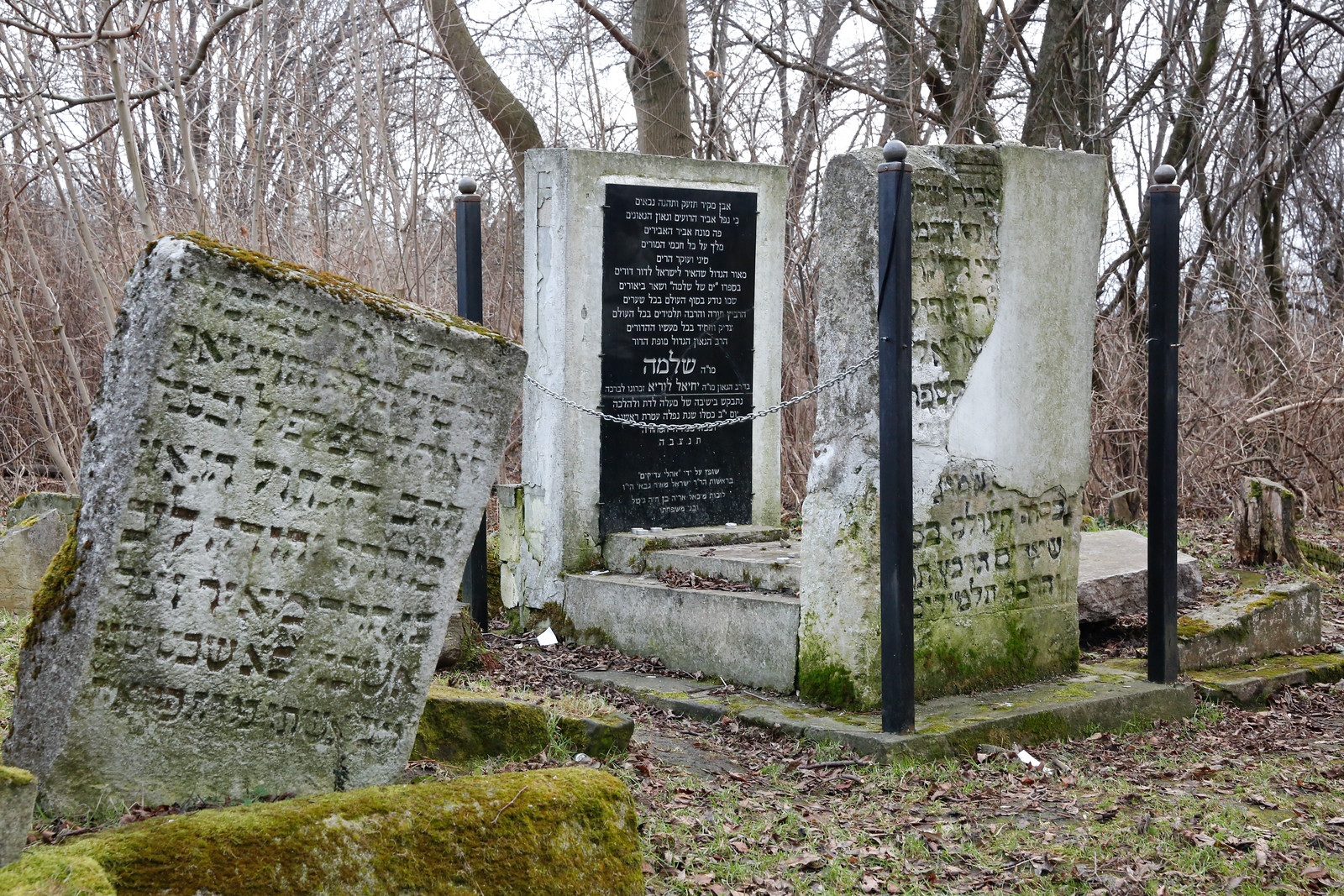
Grave of Solomon Luria (right), Old Jewish Cemetery, Lublin

Luria was born in the city of Poznań (Posen), in the Kingdom of Poland. His father, Yechiel Luria, was the rabbi of the Lithuanian city of Slutzk and the great grandson of the eminent Talmudist Miriam Luria. The Luria family claims descent from Rashi. (Note: For Solomon's descent and relatives, see) Luria studied in Lublin under Rabbi Shalom Shachna, and later in the Ostroh yeshiva under Kalonymus Haberkasten, the daughter, Lipka, of whom he later married. Joshua Falk studied at the yeshiva, as well. The Maharshal served as a rabbi in Brest, Belarus, and various Lithuanian communities for 15 years.

Around 1550, he had several correspondences with Rabbi Moses Isserles (a.k.a. Rema). Isserles supported the moderated use of philosophy in Jewish studies, while Luria was more critical of this approach. He believed that Isserles contradicted the Geonim in his arguments. Despite debating Isserles's method, Luria was friendly in his replies.

When Haberkasten assumed the position of rosh yeshiva in Brisk, Luria replaced him as the official rabbi of the city and region of Ostroh. Luria later succeeded Shalom Shachna as head of the Lublin yeshiva, which attracted students from all over Europe. Due to various internal problems in the yeshiva, he opened his own yeshiva. The building, known as the "Maharshal's shul", remained intact until World War II.

== Works ==
Yam Shel Shlomo, Luria's major work of Halakha, was written on sixteen tractates of the Talmud; however, it is extant on only seven. In it, Maharshal analyzes key sugyot (passages) and decides between various authorities as to the practical halacha. Maharshal, famously, objected to Isserles's method of presenting halakhic rulings without discussing their derivation. He wrote Yam Shel Shlomo to "probe the depths of the halacha" and to clarify the process by which those halachot are reached.

Chochmat Shlomo is a gloss, and comments, on the text of the Talmud. One aim of this work being to establish the correct text. To achieve this Maharshal scrutinized the published editions of the Talmud as well as the commentaries of Rashi, Tosafot, and other Rishonim. His comments were later published by his son; an abridged version of Chochmat Shlomo appears in nearly all editions of the Talmud today, at the end of each tractate. The original, separately printed version, is far more extensive, and has now been re-published in the Metivta/Oz ve-Hadar edition of the Talmud. The Chida writes that "I've heard from elders, that the Maharshal is extremely deep; and most hasagot (criticisms/objections) from the Maharsha on the Maharshal, aren't hasagot if the reader will delve deep into the subject".

Maharshal also wrote:

- Yeri'ot Shlomo, a super-commentary on Rashi's commentary on the Torah (in fact a commentary on Elijah Mizrachi's supercommentary on Rashi) - HebrewBooks.org;
- Amudei Shlomo, a commentary on Sefer Mitzvot Gadol ("SeMag") of Rabbi Moses ben Jacob of Coucy;
- A collection of Responsa; see History of Responsa: Sixteenth century.

== See also ==
- Elijah Ba'al Shem of Chelm – one of his famous students who, according to legend, could create a golem creature
- Moshe ben Avraham – one of his students, author of the Mateh Moshe
