= Daniel ben Azariah =

11th century rabbi

Daniel ben Azariah (Hebrew: דניאל בן עזריה, died August 1062) was the gaon of the Land of Israel from 1051 till 1062. Descended from a Babylonian exilarch family, he was a scion of the House of David and was elected to head the Palestinian Academy in Jerusalem. The Ben Ezra Synagogue of the Palestinian Jews in Fostat was named in his honour: "Synagogue of our Lord Daniel, the Light of Israel, the Great Prince and Head of the Academy of the Majesty of Jacob." His nomination to the gaonate was not without controversy as it prevailed over the selection of one of the sons of an earlier gaon, Solomon ben Joseph ha-Cohen who had held office from for six months in 1025. In 1062 Daniel died after a long and serious illness which he himself is said to have seen as a punishment for his ill treatment of his predecessor's family. His son, David ben Daniel, was too young to assume his father's position and Elijah, son of Solomon ben Joseph and former av beth din, became gaon until 1083. David ben Daniel was subsequently involved in a succession dispute regarding the gaonate.

Jewish titles
Preceded by Solomon ben Judah	Gaon of Palestine; Daniel ben Azariah; 1051–1062	Succeeded by Elijah ben Solomon ha-Cohen
