= Bat ha-Levi =

12th Century Jewish scholar

Bat ha-Levi (12th-century), was an Iraqi Jewish scholar. She gave lessons to male students and had a remarkable position for a Jewish woman in 12th-century Iraq.

Her name is not known, and she is known under the name Bat ha-Levi, meaning 'the daughter of the Levite'. She was the only child of Rabbi Samuel ben Ali (Samuel ha-Levi ben al-Dastur, d. 1194), the Geon of Baghdad. In the Medieval Middle East, education was normally low for Jewish women, but Bat ha-Levi was a famous exception. She was active as a teacher and gave lessons to her father's male students from a window, with her students listening from the courtyard below. This arrangement intended to preserve her modesty as well as prevent the students from being diverted.

A eulogy in the form of a poem by R. Eleazar ben Jacob ha-Bavli (c. 1195–1250), is believed to describe the virtues and wisdom of Bat ha-Levi.

Her activities were reported in the medieval travel diary Petachiah of Regensburg.

She married one of her father's students, Zekharya ben Berakh'el, who died before her father did.

== See also ==
- Miriam Shapira-Luria

== Sources ==
- Baskin, J. R. (2012). Educating Jewish Girls in Medieval Muslim and Christian Settings. Making a Difference: Essays on the Bible and Judaism in Honor of Tamara Cohen Eskenazi. Sheffield: Sheffield Phoenix, 19–37.
- Emily Taitz, Sondra Henry & Cheryl Tallan, The JPS Guide to Jewish Women: 600 B.C.E.to 1900 C.E., 2003
- https://jwa.org/encyclopedia/article/learned-women-in-traditional-jewish-society
