= Shalom Shachna =

Polish rabbi

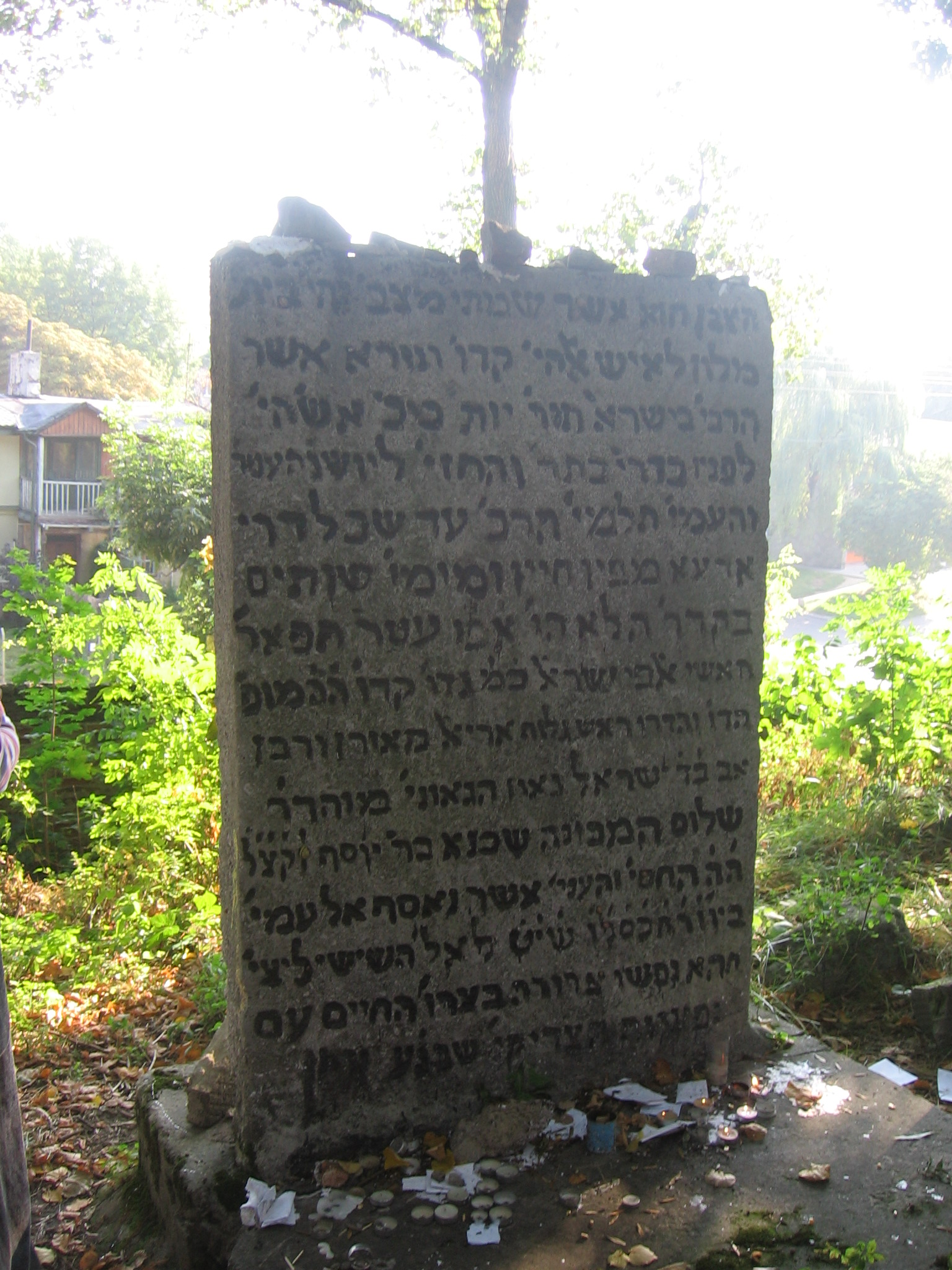

Shalom Shachna (c. 1490 or c. 1510 – 1558) was a rabbi and Talmudist, and Rosh yeshiva of several great Acharonim including Moses Isserles, who was also his son-in-law.

== Biography ==
Shachna was a pupil of Jacob Pollak, founder of the method of Talmudic study known as Pilpul. In 1515 Shachna established the yeshiva in Lublin, which had the third largest Jewish community in Poland during that period. Shachna became famous as a teacher, and students came to Lublin from all over Europe to study there. The yeshiva became a center of learning of both Talmud and Kabbalah; the Rosh yeshiva received the title of rector and equal rights to those in Polish universities with the permission of the King in 1567. (This, as well as the great scholarship of those who studied there, have led some to refer to Lublin as "the Jewish Oxford".) Shachna was succeeded as head of Lublin Yeshiva by Solomon Luria (the Maharshal).

== Works ==
Only one of Shachna's writings, the treatise Pesakim be-Inyan Kiddushin has been published - Shachna was known for his modesty, and enjoined his son Israel from printing any of his manuscripts.
