= Avi Ben-Abraham =

Israeli-American scientist

- אבי בן אברהם
- Known for: Member of the Association of American Physicians and Surgeons, Human cloning attempts
- Scientific career
- Fields: Medical science
- Institutions: Association of American Physicians and Surgeons, Commission on Judicial Nominees Evaluation of the State Bar of California

Avi Ben-Abraham (Hebrew: אבי בן אברהם) is an Israeli-American scientist, member of the Association of American Physicians and Surgeons.

== Politics ==
In 1999, Ben-Abraham was endorsed by Israel's Prime Minister Benjamin Netanyahu, and won the primaries for a top seat on the governing Likud party list of candidates for the Knesset. He was elected member of the Likud's party central committee, and was appointed as a senior adviser to Israel's Minister of Justice.

Ben-Abraham served as commissioner, Commission on Judicial Nominees Evaluation of the State Bar of California. In that capacity he interviewed and evaluated hundreds of judges and several justices of the California Supreme Court.

Appointed by the Governor and by the State Bar of California, Ben-Abraham received his security clearance from the California Department of Justice and the FBI. He was sworn in by Chief Justice Malcolm Lucas.

== Human Cloning ==
In 2001 Ben-Abraham, along with Panayiotis Zavos, a reproductive physiologist, and Severino Antinori, an infertility specialist, announced their attempt at cloning the first human in an undisclosed country by 2003. The group attempted the procedure, but stated that it was unsuccessful.
