= Isaac ben Abraham =

Isaac ben Abraham may refer to:

- Isaac, patriarch in the Bible and son of Abraham
- Isaac ben Abraham of Dampierre (Isaac ha Bahur, or "RIBa"), 12th/13th-century tosafist, brother of Samson ben Abraham of Sens
- Isaac ben Abraham of Posquières (Isaac the Blind), 12th/13th-century writer on Kabbalah
- Isaac Gorni, late 13th-century Hebrew troubadour from Gascony
- Isaac of Troki (c. 1530–c. 1590), 16th-century Karaite Jewish theologian
- Isaac ben Abraham Aboab
