= Hayyim ben Abraham Uziel =

16th century Sephardic Jewish scholar and author

Hayyim ben Abraham Uziel (Hebrew: חיים בן אברהם עזיאל) was a Sephardic Jew scholar and author who flourished in the latter half of the 16th century in the Ottoman Empire. He wrote Meḳor Ḥayyim (3 vols., Smyrna, n.d.), an ethical work in Judæo-Spanish.
