= Saadia ben Abraham Longo =

16th century Turkish Hebrew poet

Saadia ben Abraham Longo (Hebrew: סעדיה בן אברהם לונגו) was a Turkish Hebrew poet, who lived in Constantinople in about the middle of the 16th century.

A manuscript in the Bodleian Library contains a collection of Longo's poems about various subjects; letters written by him to contemporary scholars and by them to him; a poetical correspondence between Longo and David Onkeneira; and a paper entitled Naḥal Ḳedumim, in prose interspersed with verse in which occur 1,000 words beginning with aleph, an arrangement similar to that which was followed in the Elef Alfin of Ibn Latimi.

Some of Longo's dirges were published under the title Shivre Luḥot (Salonica, 1594). To them is prefixed a chronicle of Jewish writers and their works, entitled Seder Zemannim. Longo wrote, besides, poems on many works of his contemporaries; these poems are printed at the beginning of the works to which they refer.
