= Norma Joseph =

Norma Baumel Joseph
- Born: Norma Baumel; 1944 (age 81–82); Brooklyn, New York
- Education: Brooklyn College (BA); City University of New York (MA); Concordia University (PhD)
- Occupation: Professor
- Known for: Jewish feminist activism

Norma Baumel Joseph (born 1944 in Brooklyn) is an American-born Canadian professor and Jewish feminist activist. In 1990, Joseph was successful in working with the Government of Canada to pass a law that would protect Jewish women in need of a get. She currently serves as Professor of Religion at Concordia University and Associate Director of the University's Azrieli Institute of Israel Studies.

== Biography ==
Joseph was born in Brooklyn to Moishe (Murray) Baumel and Madeline (née Kohn). Moishe was a salesman who had emigrated to the United States as a child, and Madeline was a typist-secretary who arrived in the United States as an infant. Both sides of Joseph's family were heavily engaged in Jewish occupations. In 1965, she married Rabbi Howard Joseph who, five years later, became the leader of Montreal's Spanish and Portuguese Synagogue.

She received a B.A. from Brooklyn College in 1966, an M.A. from the City University of New York in 1968, and a Ph.D in religion from Concordia University in 1995. Her doctoral dissertation focused on the legal decisions of Rabbi Moshe Feinstein concerning the separate spheres for women in the Jewish community. The dissertation was nominated for a Governor General's Gold Medal award for excellence. In 1975 she began teaching at Sir George Williams University.

Joseph has published widely in scholarly books and journals as an expert in Jewish feminist thought. She serves on the editorial board of Women in Judaism, on the advisory board of the Journal of Religion and Culture, on the advisory council of JOFA, and on the international board of the Jewish Women's Archive. In 1995, she received the Leo Wasserman Prize for the best article published in American Jewish History that year for "Jewish Education for Women: Rabbi Moshe Feinstein’s Map of America" (vol. 83, no. 2, 205–222). Her teaching and research areas include women and Judaism, Jewish law and ethics, and women and religion.

== Jewish feminist activism ==
From the early 1970s she promoted women's greater participation in Jewish religious and communal life. In 1988 Joseph acted as one of the founding members of Women of the Wall, where, alongside Anat Hoffman and other notable Israeli and Jewish feminists, she carried a Torah to the women's section of the Western Wall. She is a member of the advisory board of Kol ha-Isha: A Feminist House of Study in Jerusalem, sponsored by the Conservative movement.

Joseph has been particularly active in the issue of agunot, women denied divorce. As a founding member of the Canadian Coalition of Jewish Women for the Get, she successfully worked with the Jewish community and the Canadian Federal Government to pass a law in 1990 (Divorce Act, ch.18, 21.1) that would protect Jewish women in difficult divorce situations and aid them in their pursuit of a Jewish divorce. Following the Canadian success, Joseph helped form the International Coalition for Agunah Rights, an international coalition of women's groups advocating for agunot.

== Honours and awards ==
Joseph won the Leo Wasserman Prize from the American Jewish Historical Society for the best article of 1995 in the journal American Jewish History. She was recognized by the National Council of Jewish Women (Montreal chapter), which chose her as its Woman of Distinction in 1998; by the Montreal Jewish community, which presented her with the Jacob Zipper Education Award in 2000; and by Jewish Women International, from which she received the Leading Light, Woman of the Year Award in 2002.

Joseph was a recipient of a Social Sciences and Humanities Research Council research grant on gender and identity in the Iraqi Jewish Community of Montreal. She was the 2019 recipient of the Louis Rosenberg Canadian Jewish Studies Distinguished Service Award.
