= Moshe ben Avraham of Przemyśl =

Rabbi Moshe ben Avraham of Przemyśl was a Galician rabbi; born at Przemysl about 1550; died at Opatow in 1606. Surnamed Met (or Mat; Hebrew: מת, sometimes Hebrew: מאט) or in the Ashkenazi pronunciation Mes. As Rabbi Moshe is best known for his work Mateh Moshe, he is also often personally referred to as the Mateh Moshe.

== Biography ==
After having studied Talmud and rabbinics under his uncle R. Zvi and Shlomo Luria, he became rabbi of Belz, where he had a large number of pupils. He retired from this rabbinate and lived privately for a time at Volodymyr-Volynskyi. He was then called to the rabbinate of Przemysl, and, in 1597, to that of Lubomyl. Toward the end of his life, he became the chief of the community of Opatow and district rabbi of Cracow.

He authored the following works:

- Taryag Mitzvot (Cracow, 1581), a versification of the 613 commandments
- Mateh Moshe (ib. 1590–91), a treatise on the practical ritual laws
- Ho'il Moshe (Prague, 1611), a simple and homiletic commentary on the Pentateuch, in which he occasionally explains the commentary of Rashi

Some responsa of his are to be found in the responsa collections of his rabbinical contemporaries.
