= Meir Angel =

Rabbi and preacher (16th and 17th centuries)

Meir ben Abraham Angel (Hebrew: מאיר בן אברהם אנג'יל) of Belgrade was a rabbi and maggid (preacher) who lived in the sixteenth and seventeenth centuries.

He died in Safed, in the Land of Israel, after having traveled through Poland, Italy, and Greece.

== Works ==
- "Masoret ha-Berit" (Tradition of the Covenant), 700 homilies on texts strung together according to certain Masoretic lists, published at Kraków, in 1619.
- "Masoret ha-Berit ha-Gadol," containing 1,650 homilies of the same character, published at Mantua, in 1622.
- "Ḳeshet Neḥushah" (Bow of Bronze), an ethical work in verse alternating with rimed prose. In this work, he pictures a sort of moral combat in which the tendency to do ill is personified. This was published, about the year 1593, at Belyedere, near Constantinople, by Reyna, the widow of Joseph Nasi.

He also mentions a commentary on Abot, which seems not to have been published.
