= David Raphael ben Abraham Polido =

Jewish satirist in the 17th and 18th centuries

David Raphael ben Abraham Polido (Hebrew: דוד רפאל בן אברהם פולידו, romanized: Daṿid Refaʼel ben Avraham Polido; fl. 17th and 18th centuries) was a Jewish satirist. He wrote Zikhron Purim (lit. 'Remembrance of Purim'), a parody on the piyyutim for Purim, followed by a testament of Haman, a poem full of coarse jokes, but a good imitation of the Sephardic piyyutim (Livorno, 1703). (Note: Franz Delitzsch gives 1736 as the date of its publication.)

His name, and the fact that his work was printed in Livorno, suggest that he was an Italian; but Somerhausen reads פולניא ('Polonya' or 'Polnia') instead of Polido, whereas Steinschneider interprets it as 'Fulda.'
