= Solomon ben Elijah ha-Cohen =

11th-century Gaon of Palestine

- שלמה בן אליהו הכהן גאון
- Office: Gaon of Palestine
- Predecessor: Abiathar ben Elijah ha-Cohen
- Successor: Masliah ben Solomon ha-Cohen
- Relatives: Abiathar ben Elijah ha-Cohen (brother)

Solomon ben Elijah ha-Cohen (Hebrew: שלמה בן אליהו הכהן גאון) was the successor to and brother of Abiathar ben Elijah ha-Cohen. He lived from the late 11th to early 12th century.
