= Samuel ben Ali =

Iraqi rabbi

Shmuel ben Ali ha-Levi
- Title: Gaon of Baghdad
- Died: 1194 Baghdad, Abbasid Caliphate

Religious life
- Religion: Judaism

Jewish leader
- Predecessor: Solomon
- Successor: Zechariah ben Berakhel
- Yeshiva: Pumbedita Academy (Baghdad)

Shmuel ben Ali ha-Levi (Hebrew: שמואל בן עלי הלוי, also Samuel ben Ali ibn al-Dastur; died 1194) was the most noteworthy of the twelfth-century Babylonian scholars and the only one of his era whose written works have survived in any significant number.

== Biography ==
Samuel served as head of the academy in Baghdad for nearly thirty years and was a recognized leader of neighboring countries as well. He appointed judges throughout Iraq, Iran, and Syria, and presided over many congregations throughout Asia. His Talmudic lectures were attended by thousands of pupils, each who had undergone a preparatory course in advance. He was also well-versed in the field of astrology. A description of Samuel and his grandeur is provided by Petachiah of Regensburg in his medieval diary.

Samuel had a strong personality and clashed with Maimonides on a variety of occasions. Samuel wrote glosses to Maimonides’ works, and the latter addressed them in a letter to his student, Joseph b. Judah. Samuel criticized Maimonides’ position on resurrection and the world to come and had fiercely debated Maimonides’ student, Joseph b. Judah, on these issues as well. Additionally, circles associated with Samuel were disseminating propaganda attacking Maimonides’ positions.

Samuel’s daughter had become reputable, under the name of Bat ha-Levi, for her Talmudic expertise and public lectures to students who would remain outside and listen, while she remained indoors and unseen.

A collection of Samuel’s letters were published in Tarbiz.

Preceded by Solomon	Babylonian Gaon circa 1060-1194	Succeeded by Zechariah ben Berakhel
