= Jacob Mann =

Jewish-American historian (1888-1940)

Jacob Mann (August 26, 1888 – October 23, 1940) was a Galician-born Jewish-American historian who taught at Hebrew Union College for nearly 20 years.

== Life ==
Mann was born on August 26, 1888, in Przemyśl, Galicia, Austria-Hungary, the son of Nisen Mann and Mindel Eichbaum. His father was a poor shochet.

In 1908, Mann moved to London and began studying for the rabbinate at Jews' College while taking secular courses at London University. He received a B.A. in 1913, an M.A. in 1915, and a D.Litt. in 1920. He was ordained a rabbi from Jews' College in 1914. During that time, he worked as the Hebrew secretary of Chief Rabbi of the British Empire Joseph Hertz. He published two volumes of research on the Cairo Geniza called The Jews in Egypt and in Palestine under the Fatimid Caliphs, with the first volume published in 1920 and the second in 1922.

Mann immigrated to America in 1920. He taught at the Baltimore Hebrew College and Teachers' Training School as an instructor in the Bible, Talmud, and Jewish history from January 1921 to July 1922. He then began teaching at Hebrew Union College in Cincinnati in the latter year, first as professor of Jewish history and literature and then, in 1934, as professor of the Talmud and Jewish history. He was also a visiting professor at Hebrew University of Jerusalem from 1927 to 1928. He was teaching at Hebrew Union College the day he died.

While traveling abroad Mann gathered further documentation of Gaonic and Karaitic investigations, which he used for his two volume work Texts and Studies in Jewish History and Literature, with the first volume published in 1931 and the second in 1935. In the end of his life he was working on a study on the Midrash, culminating in The Bible as Read and Preached in the Old Synagogue; A Study in the Cycles of the Reading from Torah and Prophets, as well as from Psalms and in the Structure of the Midrashic Homilies. The first volume was published in 1940, the year he died, and using material he left behind Isaiah Sonne and Victor Reichert published a second volume in 1966.

In 1928, Mann married Margit Klein, daughter of Rabbi D. Klein. Their children were Alfred Nisan and Daniel.

Mann died in Cincinnati on October 23, 1940. He was buried in United Jewish Cemetery.
