= Palestinian Gaonate =

Jewish legalistic body

The Palestinian Gaonate (Hebrew: ישיבת ארץ ישראל), also referred to as the Yeshiva of Geon Ya'akov (Hebrew: ישיבת גאון יעקב), was the chief talmudic academy in Syria Palaestina and the central legalistic body of the Palestinian Jewish community during the middle of the ninth century, or even earlier, until its demise in the 11th century. It acted as the successor to the Sanhedrin, formally abolished in the early 5th century. It competed with the talmudic academies in Babylonia (Lower Mesopotamia) to support the growing diasporic communities. The Egyptian and German Jews particularly regarded the Palestinian geonim as their spiritual leaders.

The history of the Palestinian gaonate was revealed in documents discovered in the Cairo Geniza in 1896. Sparse information is available on the Geonim before the middle of the ninth century. The extant material consists essentially of a list in Seder Olam Zutta relating all the geonim to Mar Zutra.

In the middle of the eleventh century, the leadership of the academy was transferred from Tiberias to Jerusalem. It was forced to move to Tyre, Lebanon in 1071; authority was later transferred to Fustat, Egypt. The Palestinian Academy had probably ceased to exist before the Christians conquered Palestine. The tradition of the Palestinian gaonate seems to have survived at Damascus, for Benjamin of Tudela (c. 1170) says that the teachers of Damascus were considered as the "scholastic heads of the Land of Israel."

== The Palestinian Gaonate ==
The Gaonate emerged in Tiberias from the remnants of the Sanhedrin. Before the middle of the 9th century, information about the Geonim is listed in the Seder Olam Zutta, which links all the geonim to Mar-Zutra III (and thereby to the Davidic line). Fragments found in the Cairo Geniza contradict the list, claiming that a member of the priestly family headed the academy in Tiberias in the middle of the 8th century. The Gaonate moved from Tiberias to Jerusalem by the mid-tenth century. In Jerusalem, the yeshiva met on the Mount of Olives, overlooking the Temple Mount.

Evidence of the academy in Palestine existing during the lifetime of Hai ben Sherira, the last Babylonian gaon, is from a mention of Josiah Ḥaber being ordained at the "holy yeshiva of Palestine" in a document dated 1031. A postscript to a minor chronicle dating from 1046 says that Solomon ben Judah was then the "head of the Academy of Jerusalem". Three generations of the descendants of Solomon's predecessor, Solomon HaKohen ben Joseph, were heads of the rabbinic institute and bore the title of "gaon." Solomon HaKohen ben Joseph reigned for approximately six months during the year 1025. A work of one of the geonim of Palestine, the Megillat Abiathar of Abiathar ben Elijah ha-Cohen, which was discovered by Schechter in the Cairo Genizah and gives a very clear account of this episode in the history of the Jews of Palestine.

From the late ninth or early tenth century to the late eleventh century, the Gaonate hosted a Hoshana Rabbah ceremony on the Mount of Olives. Jews from across the land and the diaspora would attend to hear calendrical and other announcements given by the Gaon. During the 11th century, daily prayers were offered at the Cave of the Patriarchs for the welfare of the head of the Gaonate.

== Hierarchy of the academy ==
The hierarchy of the academy was similar to that of Babylonia, although it had become a dynastic institution. The three main positions were controlled by three families, two of which claimed priestly descent. The av beit din, the president of the court, ranked next to the gaon, and another member of the college, called "the third" (ha-shelishi), held the third highest office. A letter in the Mittheilungen aus der Sammlung der Papyrus Erzherzog Rainer addresses Solomon ben Judah, "the first gaon of Palestine." This letter clearly shows the same close connection between the Jews of Egypt and those of Palestine as is indicated in the Megillat Abiathar. Solomon ben Judah was succeeded at his death by Daniel ben Azariah, a scion of the house of exilarchs who had gone from Babylon to Palestine and had formerly done much injury to the brothers Joseph and Elijah HaKohen ben Solomon Gaon, was elected gaon, to the exclusion of Joseph, who remained av beit din. Joseph died in 1053, and his brother Elijah became av beit din. Daniel ben Azariah died in 1062 after a long and serious illness, which he is said to have acknowledged as a punishment for the ill-treatment of his predecessors. Elijah then became gaon, holding the position until 1084.

== Dispersal ==
=== Exile and contested authority ===
Following the Seljuk conquest of Jerusalem in 1071, the Palestinian academy relocated to Tyre, where it continued under Elijah ben Solomon. In 1082, Elijah convened a large assembly in Tyre, where he designated his son Abiathar as his successor to the gaonate and his other son, Solomon, as av beit din. In 1084, Elijah held a council at Haifa. He died shortly thereafter and was buried in Galilee, near the old tannaic tombs, a large concourse of people attending the burial.

Shortly after Abiathar entered office, David ben Daniel, a descendant of the Babylonian exilarchs, was proclaimed exilarch in Egypt. Ben Daniel succeeded in having his authority recognized by the Jewish communities along the Palestinian and Phoenician coasts, although Tyre retained its independence for a time. When Fatimid Egyptian recaptured Tyre in 1089, David ben Daniel extended his authority over its community too, compelling Abiathar to leave the academy. But the academy still resisted the exilarch, declaring his claims invalid and pointing out his godlessness and tyranny while in office. Fast-day services were held in 1093, and the sway of the Egyptian exilarch soon ended. The nagid Meborak, to whom ben Daniel owed his elevation, called a large assembly, which deposed him and reinstated Abiathar as gaon in Iyar of 1094. Abiathar commemorated these events in his Megillat Abiathar.

A few years later, at the time of the First Crusade, Abiathar sent a letter to the community of Constantinople from Tripolis of Phoenicia, where the academy may have relocated. Abiathar was then succeeded by his brother Solomon. An undated anonymous letter dwells on the controversies and difficulties the academy had to contend with. Solomon then moved to Ḥadrak, near Damascus, where he established Yeshivat Eretz HaTzvi (Academy of the Land of Israel).

=== Transfer to Egypt ===
Solomon's son, Masliah ben Solomon ha-Cohen, moved from Syria to Fustat, Egypt, in 1127. In Fustat there was already an independent rabbinical court, established by the exilarch David ben Daniel during his struggle for authority with the Palestinian Gaonate. The independent court subsequently merged with Masliah's academy, and Masliah retained the title of Gaon. He wrote a letter from the "gate of the Academy of Fustat" in which he gives his whole genealogy, adding the full title of "gaon, rosh yeshivat geon Ya'qov" to the names of his father, grandfather, and great-grandfather.

A daughter of Maṣliaḥ presented to the academy a book by Samuel ben Hofni, which she had inherited from her grandfather, the gaon Solomon ben Elijah. In 1112, the Mushtamil, the philological work of the Karaite scholar Aaron of Jerusalem, was copied for Elijah, a son of the gaon Abiathar, "grandson of a gaon and great-grandson of a gaon." In 1111, the same Elijah purchased at Fustat Chananel ben Chushiel's commentary on the Book of Joshua, which subsequently fell into the hands of his cousin, the gaon Maṣliaḥ. It may be noted here that the geonic family of Palestine was of Aaronite origin and that Abiathar claimed Ezra as his ancestor.

== See also ==
- History of the Jews and Judaism in the Land of Israel
- Nusach Eretz Yisrael
- Sanhedrin
