= New Jewish Cemetery =

New Jewish Cemetery may refer to:

- New Jewish Cemetery, Prague
- New Jewish Cemetery, Kraków
- New Jewish Cemetery, Riga (Latvian: Jaunie ebreju kapi, Jaunā ebreju kapsēta)
