= Jacob ben Ephraim =

Jacob ben Ephraim (died in Lublin 1648) was a Polish rabbi. At first he occupied the post of rabbi and instructor at the yeshivah of that city, whence he was called to officiate as rabbi in Brest. There he entertained in 1631 R. Yom-Ṭob Lipman Heller, who speaks of him with great respect, and mentions his officiating as rabbi in the two cities cited ("Megillat Ebah," p. 28). From Brest he returned to Lublin as rabbi, and remained there till his death.

Jacob was known as "the Gaon Rabbi Jacob of Lublin"; for he was the teacher of the most eminent Polish rabbis of his time, who studied in his yeshivah and profited by his extensive knowledge of Halakah. Only a few of his responsa have been preserved: these are to be found among the responsa of the Geone Batra'e. Some novellæ by him and by his son Rabbi Avraham Yehoshua Heschel, on Yoreh De'ah, Eben ha-'Ezer, and Ḥoshen Mishpaṭ, are still in manuscript.

== Jewish Encyclopedia bibliography ==
- Fuenn, Keneset Yisrael, p. 535;
- Oẓerot Ḥayyim, p. 252;
- Carmoly, Ha-'Orebim u-Bene Yonah, pp. 32, 33
