= Raphael of Bershad =

Chasidic rabbi and theologian

Rabbi Raphael of Bershad

Personal life
- Born: Hebrew: רְפָאֵל מִבֶּרְשִׁיד; 1751 Russian Empire
- Died: January 14, 1827 (aged 75–76) Tarashcha
- Children: Rabbi Yitzchak, Rabbi Yaakov, Rabbi Levi and a daughter
- Parents: Rabbi Yaakov Yakili or Yaakov Yukel (father); Feigl (mother)

Religious life
- Religion: Judaism

Rabbi Raphael of Bershad (Hebrew: רְפָאֵל מִבֶּרְשִׁיד; Refael of Bershad, Raphael Bershadsky; 1751 — January 14 1827, Tarashcha) — was a Hasidic tzadik renowned for his extreme modesty and absolute honesty. He holds a place of great honor in the Hasidic tradition.

Rabbi Raphael was the closest disciple of Rabbi Pinchas of Koretz and founded the "Bershad" stream of Hasidism, which flourished until the end of the 19th century. His reputation for piety was so strong that it extended to all residents of his shtetl—grooms and brides from Bershad became highly sought after in Jewish families as exemplars of devout living.

Because Rabbi Raphael placed great importance on the commandment of wearing tzitzit, he established their production in Bershad. The shtetl soon became the center for manufacturing tallitot and tzitzit throughout Ukraine.

== Biography ==
Raphael was born in 5511 on the Hebrew calendar (approximately 1751) to Rabbi Yaakov Yakili (also called Yaakov Yukel) and his mother Feigl. His father worked as a melamed—a teacher who taught reading and writing to the children of poor Jewish families. Because his father earned little and was often away from home, Raphael's childhood was difficult. When he was eight years old, his mother died, and he went to work as an apprentice to a melamed.

Raphael studied under the renowned Dov Ber of Mezeritch until the latter's death. He then continued his education at a yeshiva in Berdychiv before returning to Bershad, where he married the daughter of a melamed. Subsequently, he became a disciple of Rabbi Pinchas Shapiro of Koretz. According to Martin Buber:

Rabbi Pinchas cannot be considered apart from his most outstanding disciple, Raphael of Bershad. In the entire history of Hasidism, rich in fruitful relations between teacher and disciple, there is no other example of such pure harmony, such adequate continuation of the work. Reading the records, we sometimes scarcely know what to attribute to Pinchas and what to Raphael, and yet we have a number of sayings of Raphael that bear the stamp of independent thought. But more important than his independence is the dedication with which the disciple embodied the teachings of his master in his life, and, according to tradition, even in his death, which calmly and solemnly sealed the proclamation of the commandment of truth that the master had striven for so many years.

After the death of Rabbi Pinchas of Koritz, most of his followers became followers of Rabbi Raphael.

In the early 19th century, Rabbi Raphael reformed the prayer liturgy to ensure the texts could not be misinterpreted through the lens of Sabbatean theology.

In his memoirs, Avrom Ber Gotlober recalled that in his old age, Rebbe Refael suffered from rheumatism and needed a cane to walk. However, fearing he might appear arrogant, he refused to use it.

Rabbi Raphael of Bershad died on January 14, 1827. According to a preserved legend, his unwavering honesty led to his premature death. The day before he was scheduled to testify in court regarding a Jew he knew to be guilty, Rabbi Raphael faced an impossible dilemma: he could not bring himself to harm the man, yet he could not lie. He prayed throughout the night, asking God to take his life. In the morning, before the court session began, he passed away—sparing himself from having to testify.

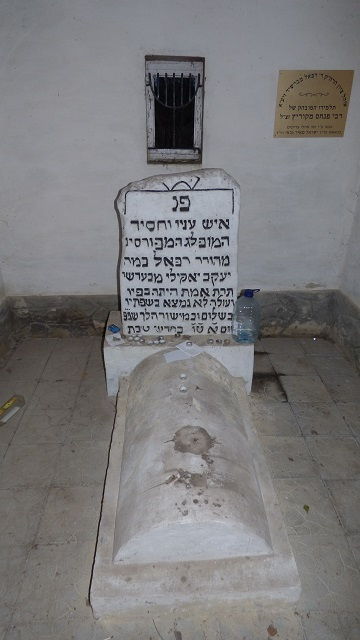
Matzevah of Raphael of Bershad

After the tzadik's death, the people of Bershad chose not to appoint another rabbi to succeed him. His followers, who lived not only in Bershad but also in Obodovka, Trostyanets, Verkhivka, and other Ukrainian shtetls, proudly called themselves "Bershad Hasidim." Rabbi Raphael's influence extended to many prominent religious and cultural figures, including Micha Josef Berdyczewski.

The grave of Tzadik Raphael of Bershad in Tarashcha remains a famous pilgrimage site, particularly during major Jewish holidays such as Rosh Hashanah. An ohel has been erected over the grave.

== Teachings ==
The core of Rabbi Raphael's teachings centered on extreme modesty and absolute honesty. Although he left no writings behind—some believe this was itself an act of modesty—his thoughts have been preserved in several sources. Some of his teachings appear in Midrash Pinhas (Ashdod: Yashlim, 2001, pp. 135–145), while others are found in the 1872 manuscript Midrash Pinḥas.

One example of his teachings illustrates his spiritual approach: Rabbi Raphael taught that if someone notices their neighbor hates them, they should respond by loving that neighbor even more.
