= Yaakov Betzalel Schneider =

Rabbi

- Title: Rabbi

Personal life
- Born: Yaakov Betzalel Feygon; 1842 Shepetivka, Russian Empire
- Died: April 26, 1917 (aged 74–75) Bilohorodka, Volhynia, Russian Empire
- Buried: Jewish Cemetery, Bilohorodka
- Spouse: Inde Schneider
- Parents: Pinhas Zineh Feygon (father); Essie Feygon (mother)

Religious life
- Religion: Judaism
- Denomination: Orthodox Judaism

Yaakov Betzalel (Feygon) Schneider (1842 - 1917) was a rabbi, a teacher, and a shochet in shtetl Bilohorodka, Volhynia in the Russian Empire (now Ukraine)

== Biography ==
Schneider was born in Shepetivka, within the Pale of Settlement of the Russian Empire, to Rabbi Pinhas Feygon, who was a shochet. According to the family story, Feygons descend from the Maharal of Prague.

When Schneider was five years old his father died. His older brother Yitzhak (Isaac) and benefactors from his hometown, especially grandchildren of the Tzaddik from Korets, made every effort to ensure he studied Torah. From his early childhood he excelled in studies. When he was 14 years old, he was married to a girl of the same age, and since then he lived in the town of Bilohorodka. Before he turned 18 he was appointed a rabbi and served as a rabbi and posek. In his youth he adopted the surname Schneider (of his wife), in order to avoid conscription into the Tsarist army.

His studies of Torah and adherence to Halakha brought him publicity. He maintained close ties with other rabbis in the Pale on halakhic issues, and for over fifty years taught, studied, and selflessly dealt with community needs.

In 1907 he traveled to Israel and settled in Jerusalem, from where he wrote letters in Hebrew to his relatives and friends. Among other things, he described with great excitement his visit to the Wailing Wall. He was dedicating all his time and energy to study and prayer, also with rabbis from Mea Shearim. He also responded to requests to review the halukka records, and sent recommendation letters helping the rabbi responsible for the distribution funds, participating in disputes that arose.

Gravestone of Yaakov Betzalel Schneider

After having lived in Jerusalem for about two years, he returned to his family and community in Bilohorodka, and in 1917 died at the age of 75.

== Legacy ==
During Schneider's time, the Jewish community in Bilohorodka counted about 2,000 people, and he served as their religious and spiritual leader. Over the years, he maintained discussions of she'elot ve-t'shuvot in Halakha with prominent rabbis of his generation. His first book, Shoshanat Yaakov (Rose of Jacob, he:שושנת יעקב), is largely based on the correspondence he conducted, summarizing more than a hundred books by Rishonim and Acharonim. After his first book was published, the community asked him to write another book about mitzvot and Jewish daily conduct, so he wrote his second book Halakhot Pesukot (Decided Laws, he:הלכות פסוקות), which was also based on she'elot ve-t'shuvot.

His two books include more than twenty haskamot from the Geonim of his generation, including Rabbi Eliezer HaCohen Harif of Zaslav, Rabbi Yechiel Michal Ben-Haim of Slavuta, and Rabbi Shaul Chaim Halevi Horowitz (he) of Jerusalem.

Vodonos mentions another book published in Chortkiv, without citing its title.

In his letters Schneider emphasizes that a person's actions influence those around him, so it is obligatory for every Jew to follow the path of Torah with grace and mutual responsibility. He commands his children and grandchildren not to spread words about hardships of life in Jerusalem, in order not to prevent anyone from immigrating to Eretz Israel and realizing the dream of being buried in the Holy Land. Despite the difficulties, he expresses elation from his stay in the Holy City, from being free to engage day and night in study, prayer, and Torah commandments.
