= Abraham Ludvipol =

Hebrew author and journalist

- אַבְרָהָם לוּדְוִיפּוֹל
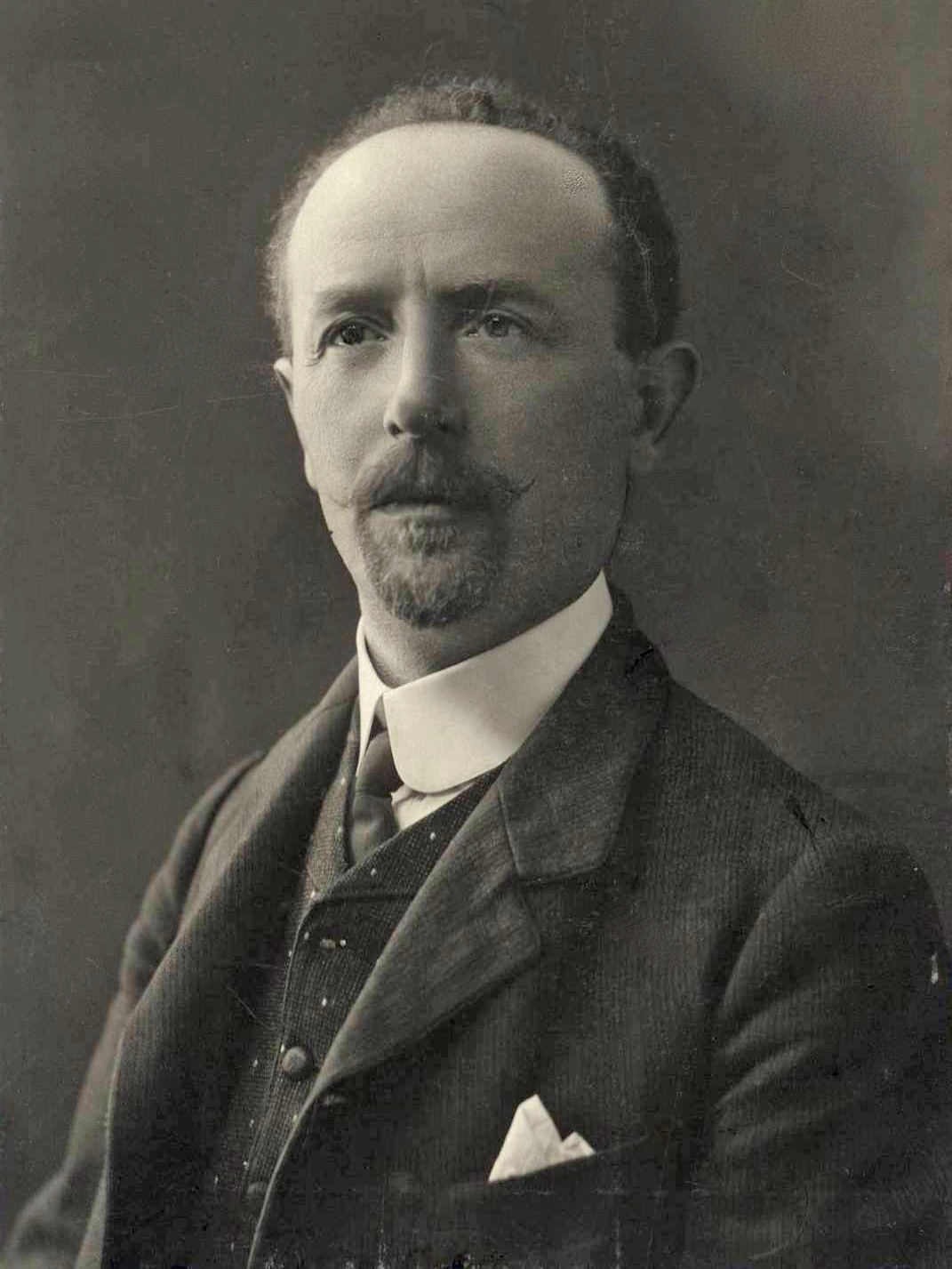
- Abraham Ludvipol, c. 1912
- Born: October or November 1865; Zvil, Volhynian Governorate, Russian Empire,
- Died: May 3, 1921 (aged 57); Tel Aviv-Yafo, Mandatory Palestine
- Resting place: Trumpeldor Cemetery
- Occupations: Translator, journalist, editor
- Writing career
- Pen name: Ha-Medinai (המדינאי)
- Language: Hebrew, Yiddish, French

Abraham Ludvipol (Hebrew: אַבְרָהָם לוּדְוִיפּוֹל; October or November 1865 – 3 May 1921) was a Ukrainian-born Hebrew journalist, translator, and Zionist activist.

== Biography ==
Ludvipol was born in the shtetl of Zvil in the Volhynian Governorate of the Russian Empire, a descendant of Rabbis Pinchas of Koretz, Elimelech of Ostropol and Yechezkel Landau. He received a traditional Hasidic education, but in his youth was exposed to the writings of the Haskalah, which he read in secret. After his apostasy was Ludvipol, his planned marriage was annulled. Ludypol served in the army as a regimental clerk, and upon his release settled in Odessa, where he joined the Hovevei Zion movement.

Ludvipol left to Palestine in 1890, but his entry into the country was denied by the Ottoman authorities. After several months working at a port in Alexandria, he moved to France and studied journalism at the Sorbonne . During this period he wrote a series of articles entitled "Letters from Paris" for Ha-Melitz. He was permitted entry to Palestine in 1897, where he wrote a series of memoirs for publication in the periodical Ha-Tsfira, but returned to Europe shortly thereafter for the First Zionist Congress.

Ludvipol wrote for the major Hebrew and Zionist newspapers of his time, including Ha-Melitz, Ha-Tsfira, Ha-Dor, Ha-Shiloaḥ, Luach Achiasaf, and Die Welt. He was active in the campaign for the release of Alfred Dreyfus during the Dreyfus affair, during which he founded the French monthly L'Écho Sioniste (Paris, 1899–1905), and was an editor of the Odessa newspaper Oddeskii listok. In 1903 he moved to Warsaw to serve as editor-in-chief of Ha-Tzofeh.

He returned to Palestine in 1907 to establish a Hebrew newspaper under the auspices of Hovevei Zion. In late 1911, Ludvipol was hired to direct the Press Bureau of the Zionist Organization's Palestine Office. He died at Tel Aviv-Yafo in May 1921.
