= Yossele the Holy Miser =

17th-century philanthropist

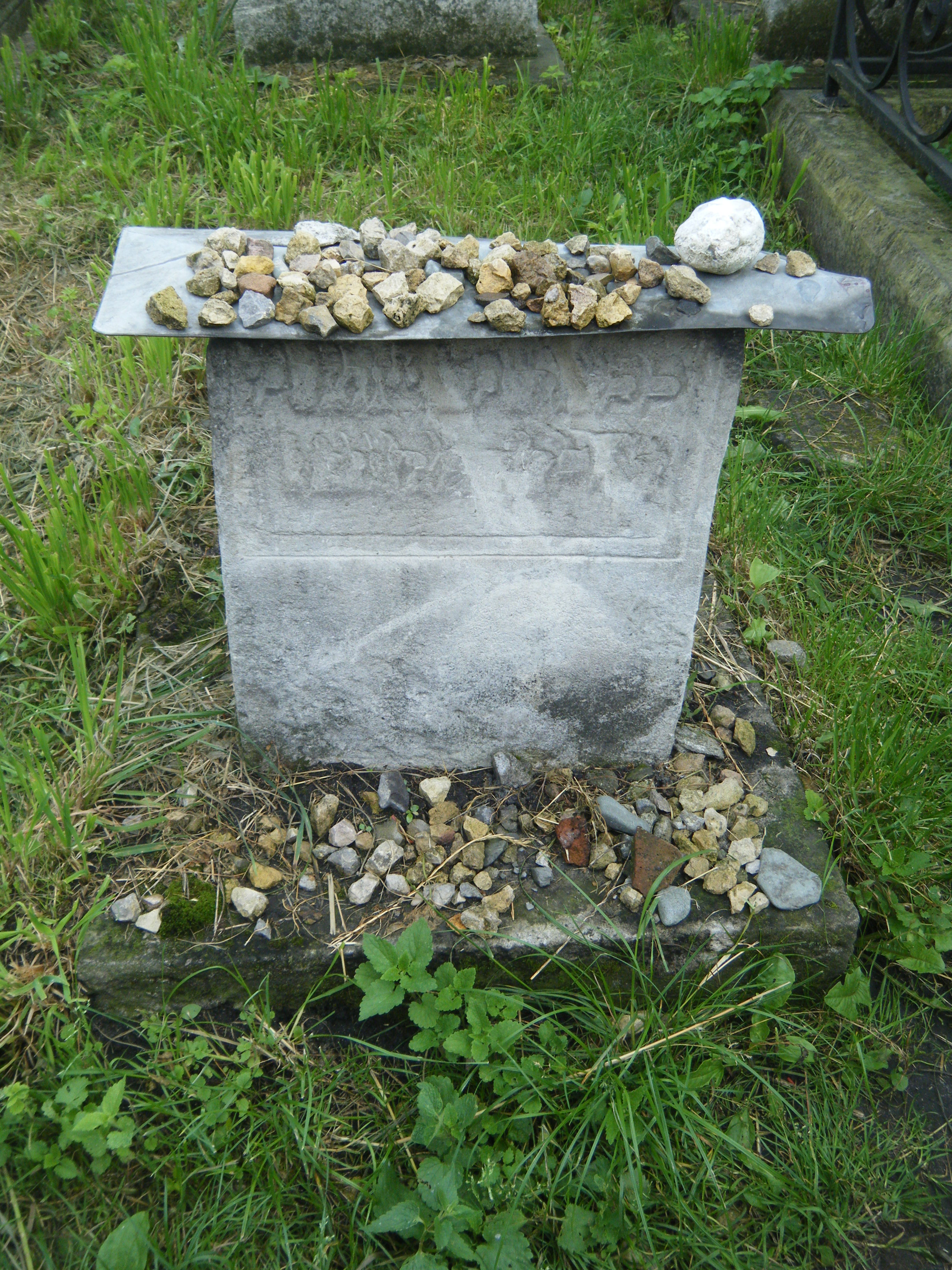
The tombstone of Yossele the Holy Miser, found in the back of the Remuh Cemetery next to the grave of Rabbi Yom-Tov Lipmann Heller. The dozens of stones found on his tombstone are a mark of remembrance and respect in the Jewish tradition.

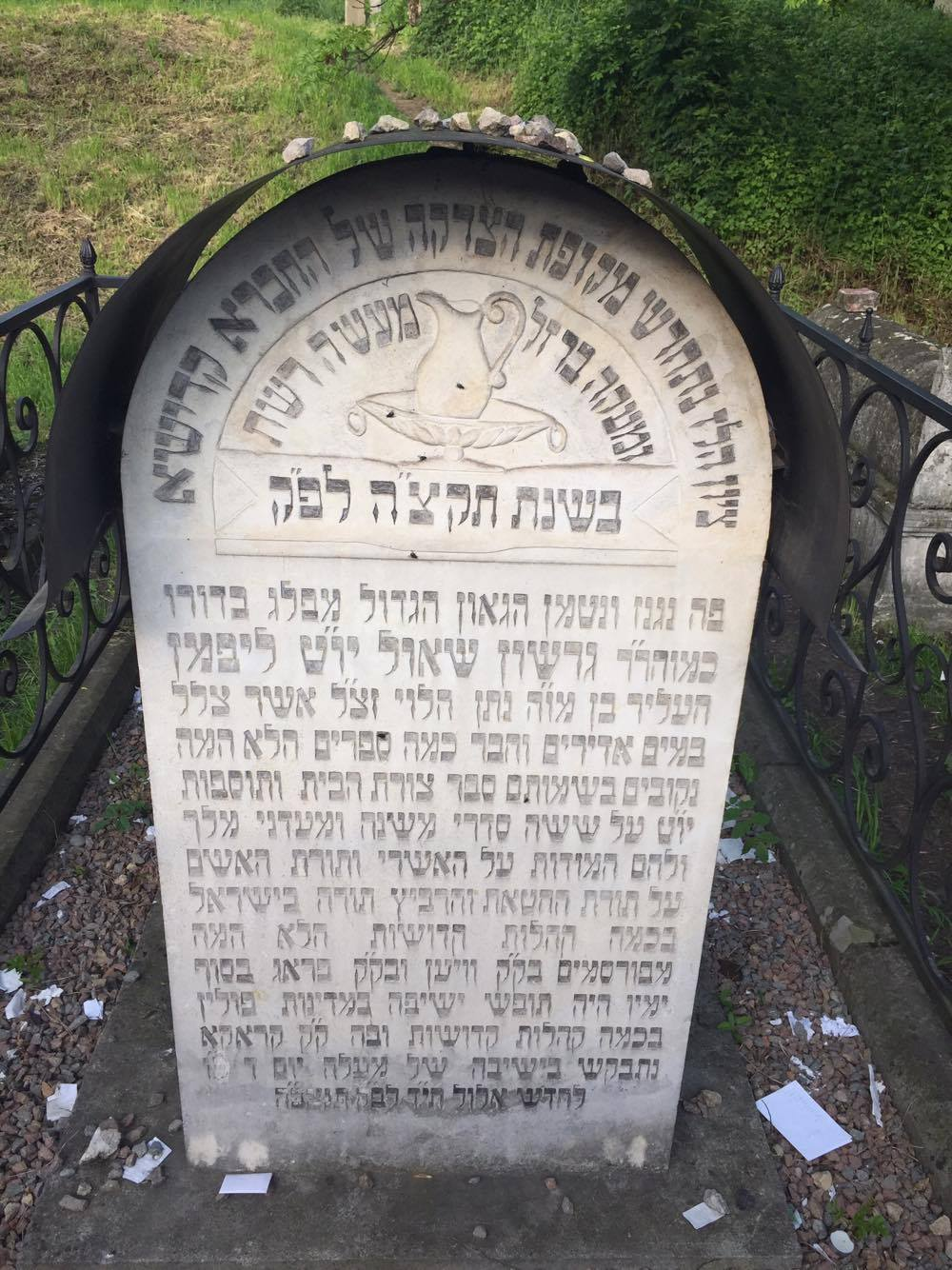
Grave of Yom-Tov Lipmann Heller in Remah Cemetery, Krakow

Yossele the Holy Miser was a Jew who lived in the Kazimierz Jewish quarter of Kraków in the 17th century. His apparent stinginess but hidden generosity is at the center of a well-known tale of Jewish folklore that speaks to one of the highest levels of tzedakah (charity) in the Jewish tradition: giving anonymously. The Holy Miser's tombstone can be found in the Remah Cemetery of Kraków next to the grave of the renowned Rabbi Yom-Tov Lipmann Heller.

== Jewish folktale ==
According to the general outline of the legend, the richest Jew in Kraków in the 17th century was Yossele the Miser. He was known by this title because in the community he was reviled for his stinginess and refusal to contribute to tzedakah (charity) despite his great wealth. When the Miser died, the townspeople who long despised him refused to bury his body for several days. Out of scorn, they eventually buried him in the back of the cemetery, an area normally reserved for paupers and other societal outcasts.

Within a week of the Miser's death, strange occurrences began to unfold in the town. All the poor began beseeching the local rabbi for money because the weekly allowances they had regularly been receiving from an anonymous benefactor had ceased arriving. Eventually, the rabbi realized that Yossele was the source of these charitable donations and in fact, the notorious miser was a great Tzadik (righteous man).

Immediately, the rabbi commanded the entire town to converge on Yossele's grave and beg for forgiveness. And on the tombstone which read "Yossele the Miser," the rabbi added the word HaTzadik—the Righteous One. According to the story, the rabbi involved was the famed sage Yom-Tov Lipmann Heller, who requested to be buried next to the Holy Miser. This is understood as the reason why the grave of the venerated Rabbi Yom-Tov is found at the back of the Remuh Cemetery next to Yossele today.

The tale underlines one of the highest forms of tzedakah according to the pre-eminent Jewish philosopher Maimonides — giving anonymously.
