= Remah Cemetery =

Jewish cemetery in Kraków, Poland

Old Jewish Cemetery (Remah Cemetery)
- Stary cmentarz żydowski (Cmentarz Remuh)
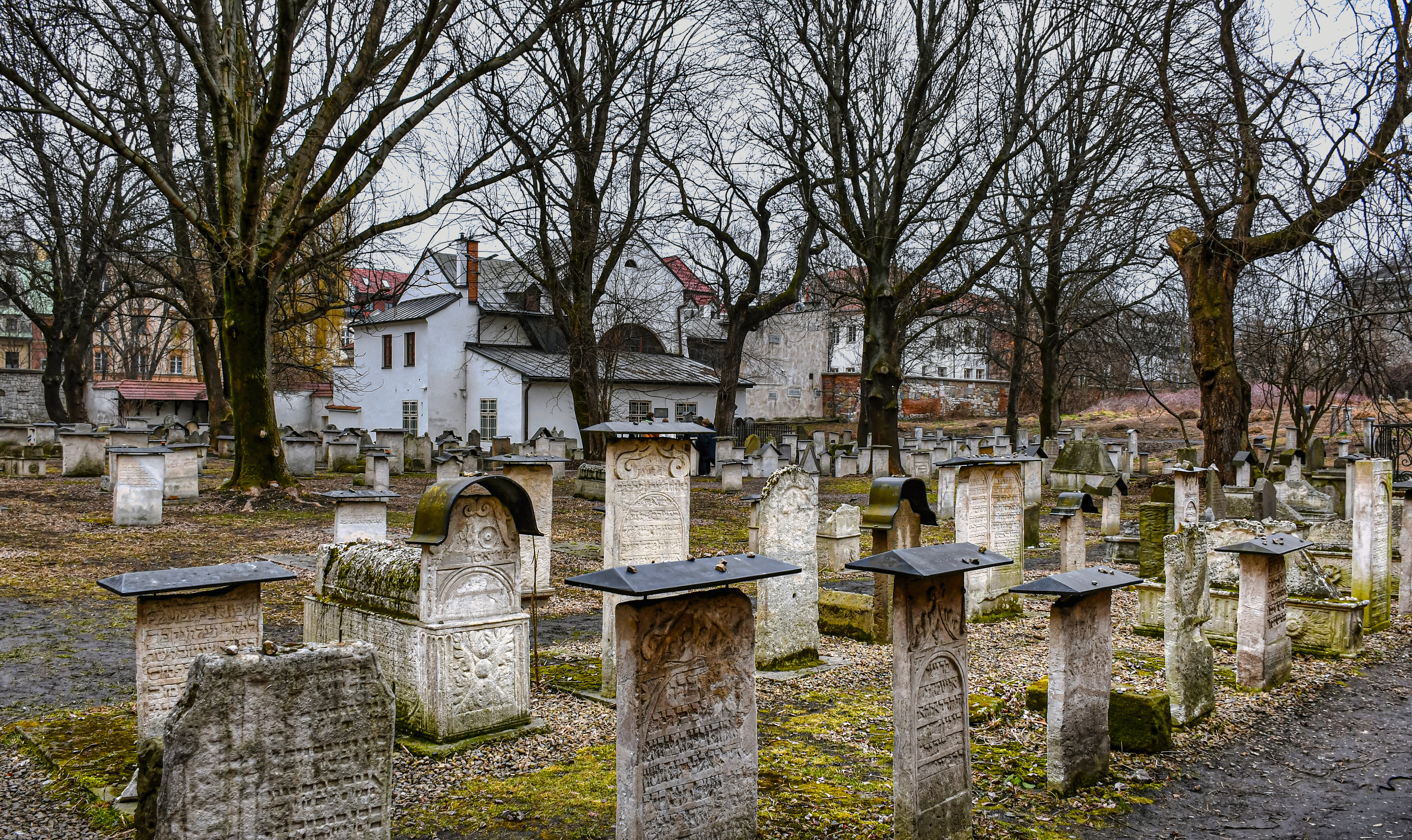
- Interactive map of Old Jewish Cemetery (Remah Cemetery)

Details
- Established: 1535–1551
- Closed: 1850
- Location: 40 Szeroka Street; Kraków
- Country: Poland
- Coordinates: 50°03′09″N 19°56′49″E
- Type: Jewish cemetery
- Size: 0,75 ha
- Footnotes

UNESCO World Heritage Site
- Type: Cultural
- Criteria: iv
- Designated: 1978
- Part of: Historic Centre of Kraków
- Reference no.: 29
- Region: Europe and North America

Historic Monument of Poland
- Designated: 1994-09-08
- Part of: Kraków historical city complex
- Reference no.: M.P. 1994 nr 50 poz. 418

The Old Jewish Cemetery (Polish: Stary cmentarz żydowski), more commonly known as the Remah Cemetery (Polish: Cmentarz Remuh), is a historic necropolis established in the years 1535–1551, and one of the oldest existing Jewish cemeteries in Poland. It is situated at 40 Szeroka Street in the Kazimierz district of Kraków, beside the 16th-century Remah Synagogue. The cemetery bears the name of Rabbi Moses Isserles, whose name is abbreviated as Remah.

The cemetery was closed in around 1850; the nearby New Jewish Cemetery at 55 Miodowa Street then became the new burial ground for the city's Jews.

Izaak Jakubowicz, donor of the Izaak Synagogue, is also buried at the cemetery.

During the German occupation of Poland, the Nazis destroyed the site by tearing down walls and hauling away tombstones to be used as paving stones in the camps, or selling them for profit. The tombstone of the Remah (Rabbi Moses Isserles) is one of the few that remained intact. The cemetery has undergone a series of post-war restorations. As is common in contemporary Poland, all original tombstones unearthed as paving stones have been returned and re-erected, although they represent a small fraction of the monuments that once stood in the cemetery.

== Notable gravesites ==
The cemetery holds the gravesites of many notable Polish Jews, including:

- Rabbi Moses Isserles, whose name is abbreviated as Remah, (c. 1525–1572), buried there along with his family;
- Mordechaj Saba (called Singer), head of the Kraków Talmudic Academy from 1572 to 1576;
- Joseph Kac, head of the Academy from 1576 to 1591.
- Nathan Nata Spira (1583–1633), Kraków rabbi and head of the Academy from 1617 to 1633;
- Jozue ben Joseph (1590–1648), also head of the Academy;
- Joel Sirkis, (1561–1640), rabbi of the Kraków Jewish community and head of the Academy;
- Isaac Landau Lewita, rabbi of Kraków's Jewish community from 1754 to 1768;
- Isaac Halevi, Kraków's rabbi and head of the Academy from 1776 to 1799.
- Rabbi Yom-Tov Lipmann Heller, (1578–1654), a Bohemian rabbi and Talmudist, best known for writing a commentary on the Mishnah called the Tosafot Yom-Tov.
- Yossele the Holy Miser, central figure in a well-known tale of Jewish folklore.
- Avraham Yehoshua Heschel, Chief Rabbi of Kraków.
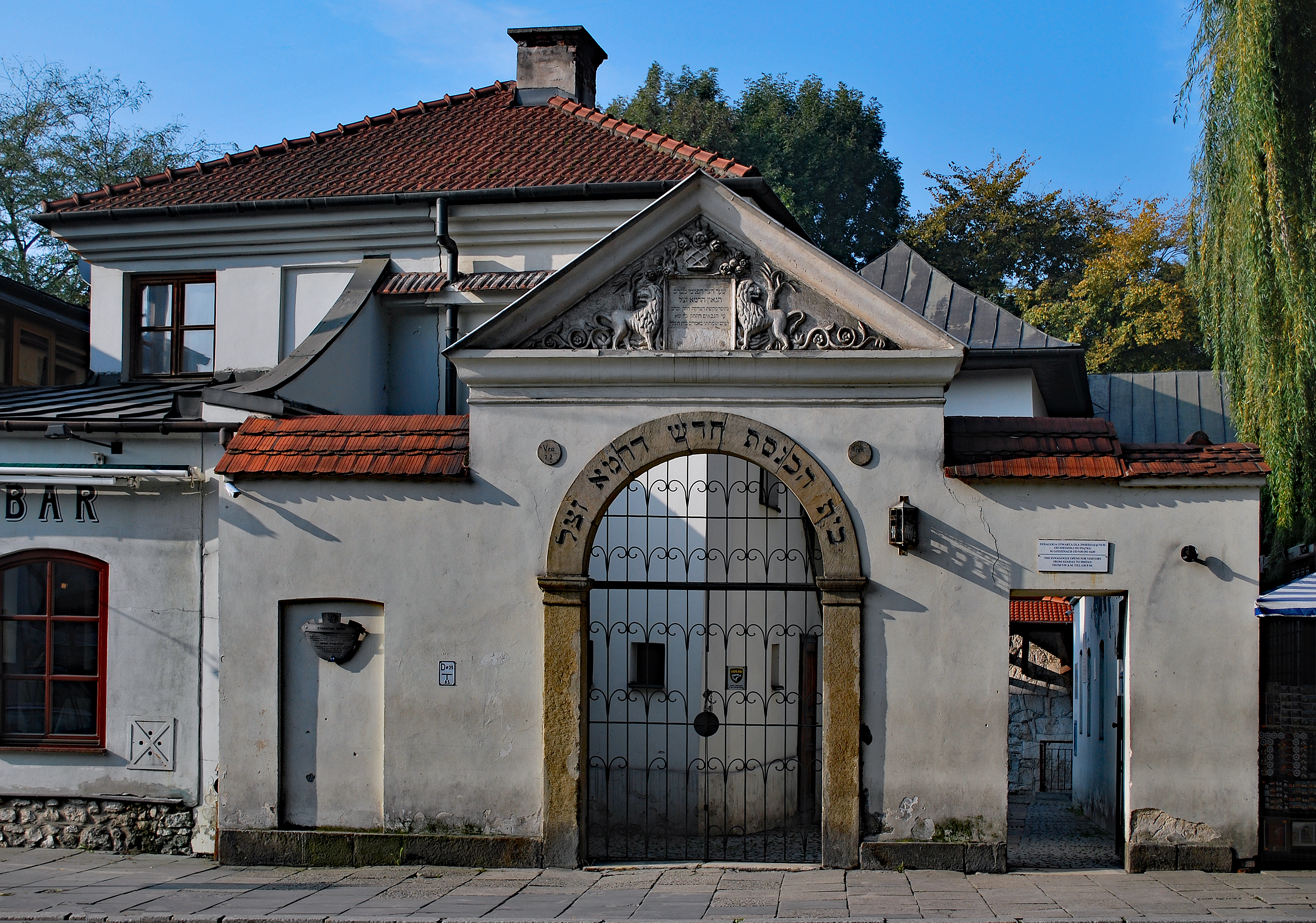
Gate to the synagogue and cemetery

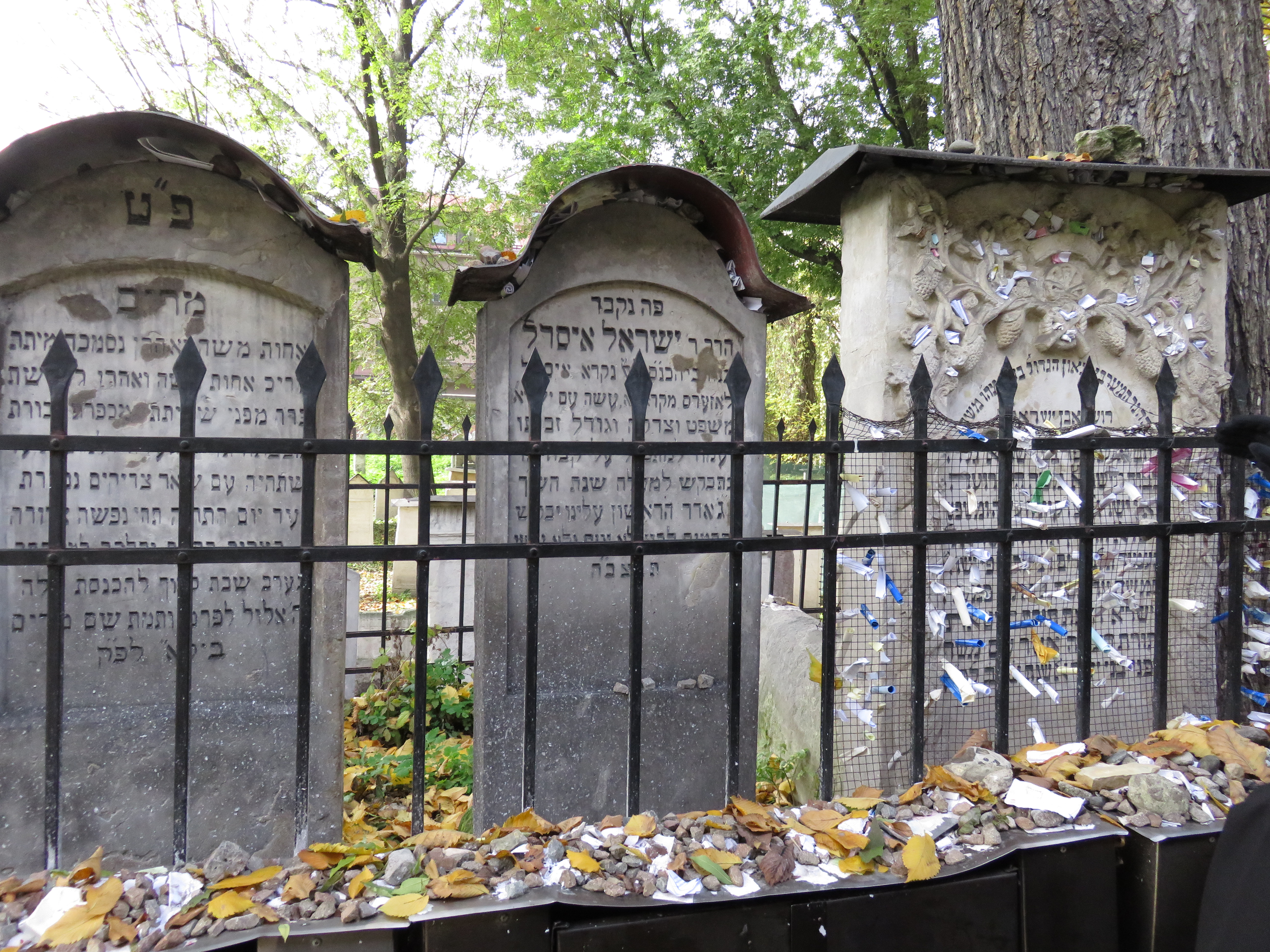
Grave of Rabbi Moses Isserles (far right)

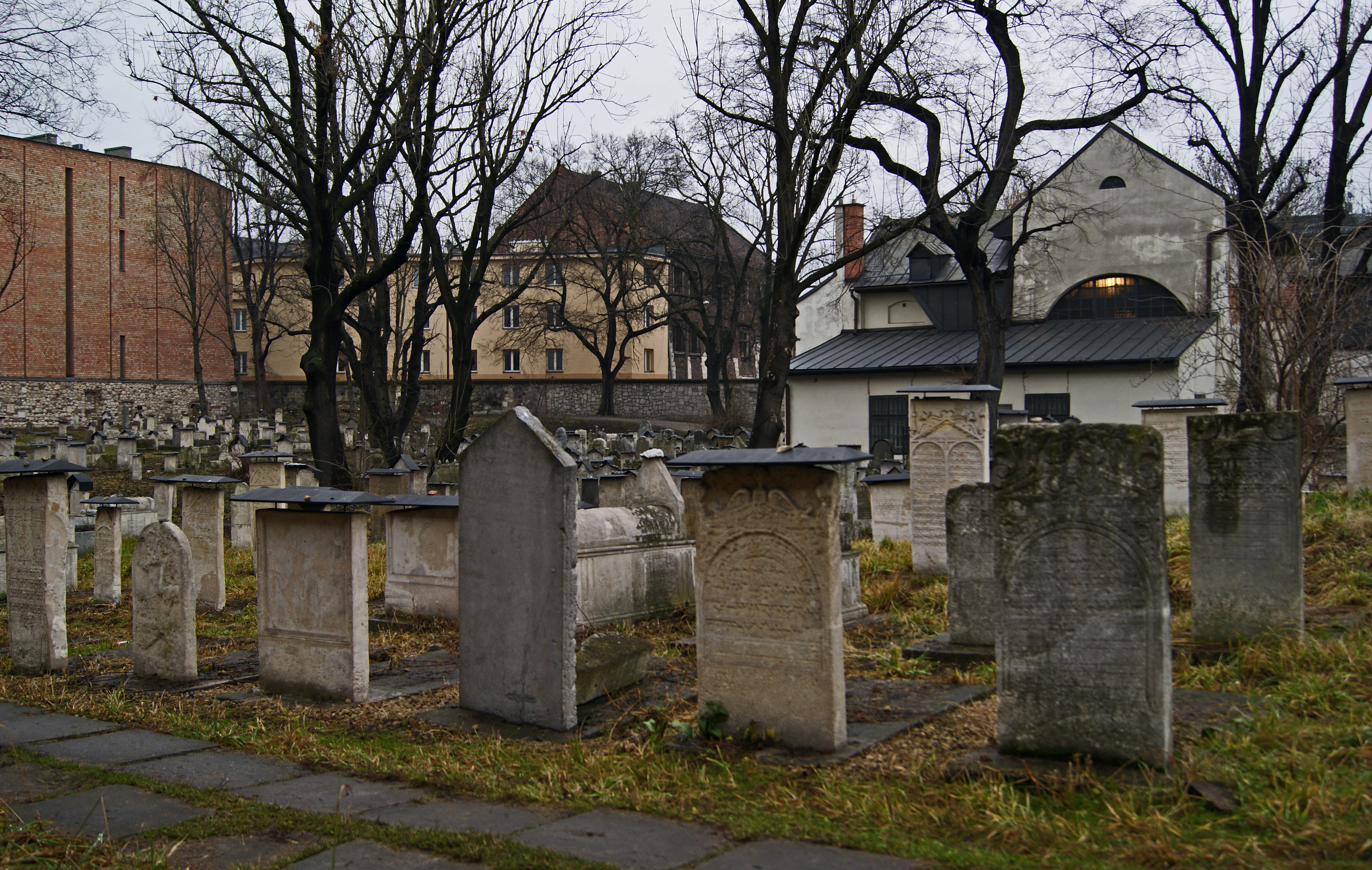
General view of the tombstones

== See also ==
- Synagogues of Kraków
- New Jewish Cemetery, Kraków
