= Artur Markowicz =

Polish-Jewish realist painter and graphic artist

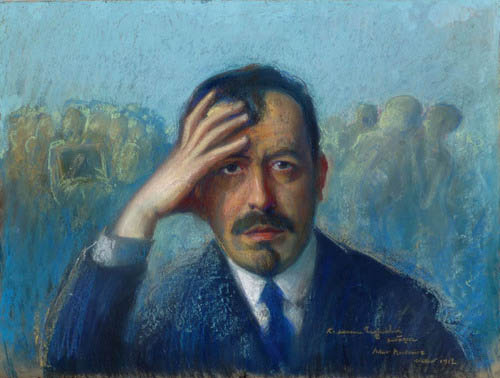
- Self-portrait (1912)
- Born: 3 March 1872; Kraków
- Died: 23 October 1934 (aged 62); Kraków
- Education: Jan Matejko Academy of Fine Arts, École des Beaux-Arts

Artur Markowicz (1872 – 1934) was a Jewish realist painter and graphic artist born in Podgórze district of Kraków (Cracow), Poland. He is best known for his numerous pastels of street scenes in the historic Jewish town of Kazimierz – now one of the largest central districts of Kraków. His works can be found at the National Museum in Gdańsk, Kraków, Warsaw, and in other state museums in Poland and Israel.

== Biography ==
He was born to a family of merchants and began his higher education with technical studies, but soon abandoned them, studying instead with professors Leopold Loeffler, Florian Cynk and Jan Matejko at the Kraków Academy of Fine Arts in 1886–1895. From 1896 until 1903 he lived in Germany and studied art at the Academy of Fine Arts, Munich with Franz Stuck. Then he went to Paris, finishing at the École des Beaux-Arts with Jean-Léon Gérôme. He also exhibited his paintings at the Salons of 1900, 1901, 1903 and 1904.

Markowicz returned to Kraków in 1904 and set up a studio in the historic district of Kazimierz. He traveled to Jerusalem in 1907–1908 where the Bezalel Academy had just opened, then to other parts of Europe until 1914. He was also a member of the "Kraków Society of Friends of Fine Arts" and the "Society for the Encouragement of Fine Arts". After 1930, he was the honorary President of the "Jewish Society for the Promotion of Fine Arts".

His Jewish scenes and character-studies show a unique originality of his style influenced by symbolism with elements of expressionism. Markowicz died in Kraków in 1934 at the age of 62, and is buried at the local New Jewish Cemetery.

== Selected paintings ==
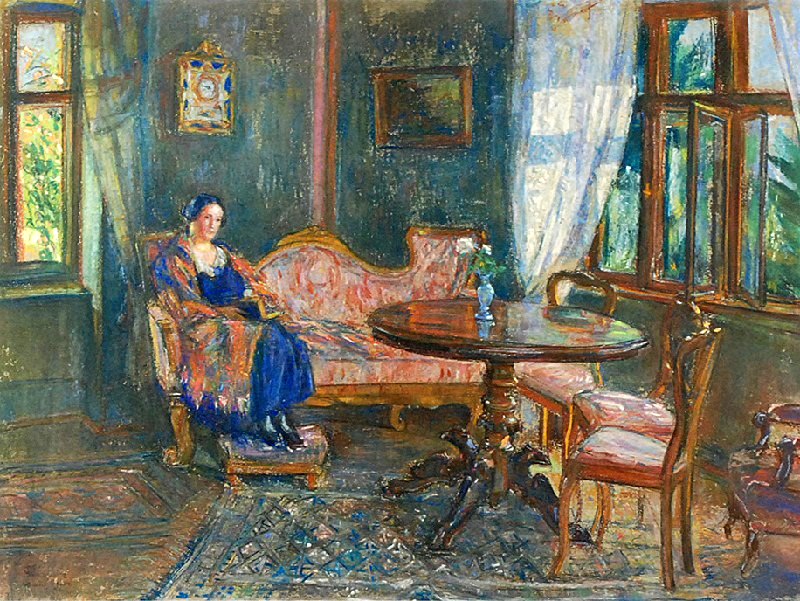
Portrait of His Wife

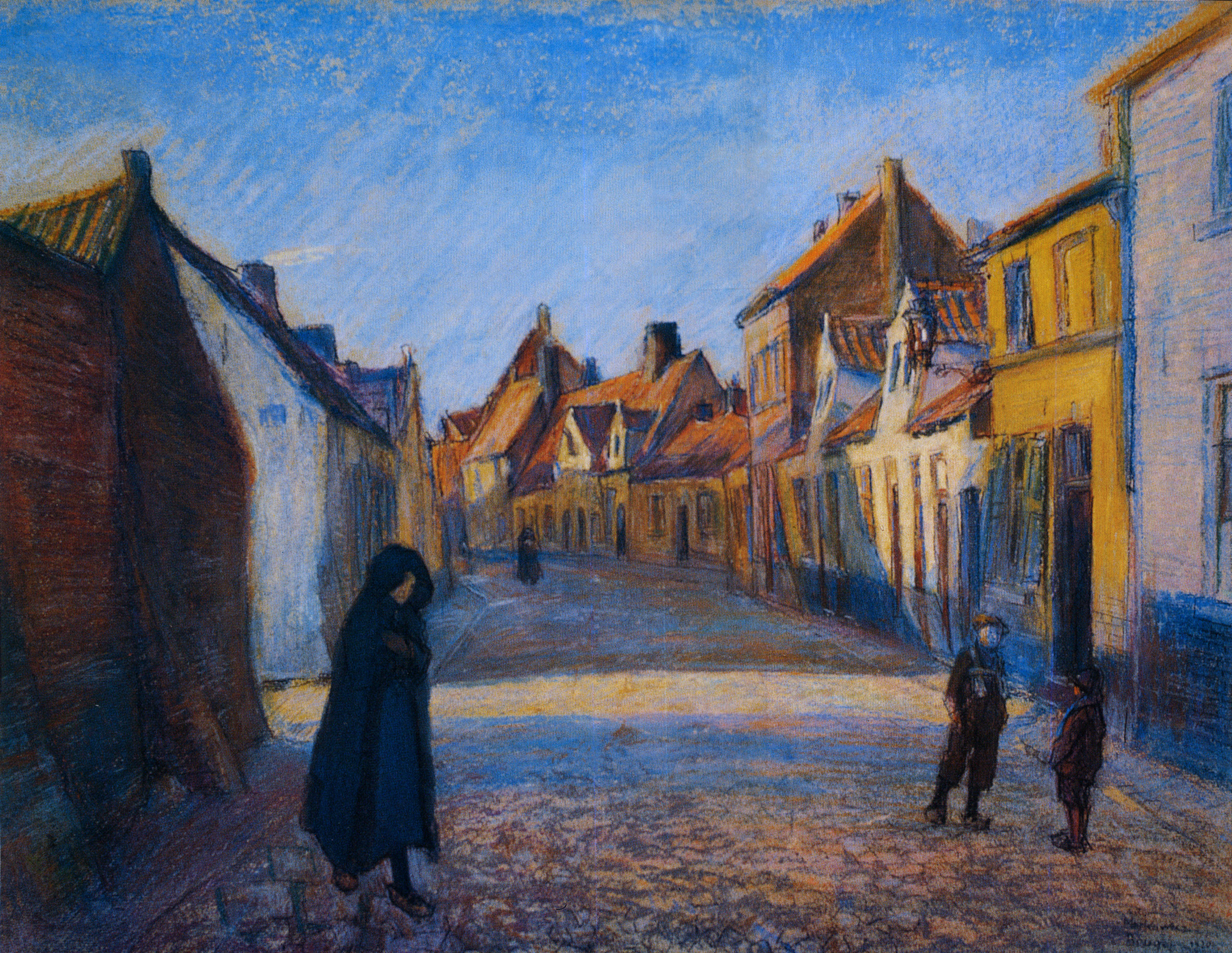
Ray of Sunlight
in the Streets of Brugge

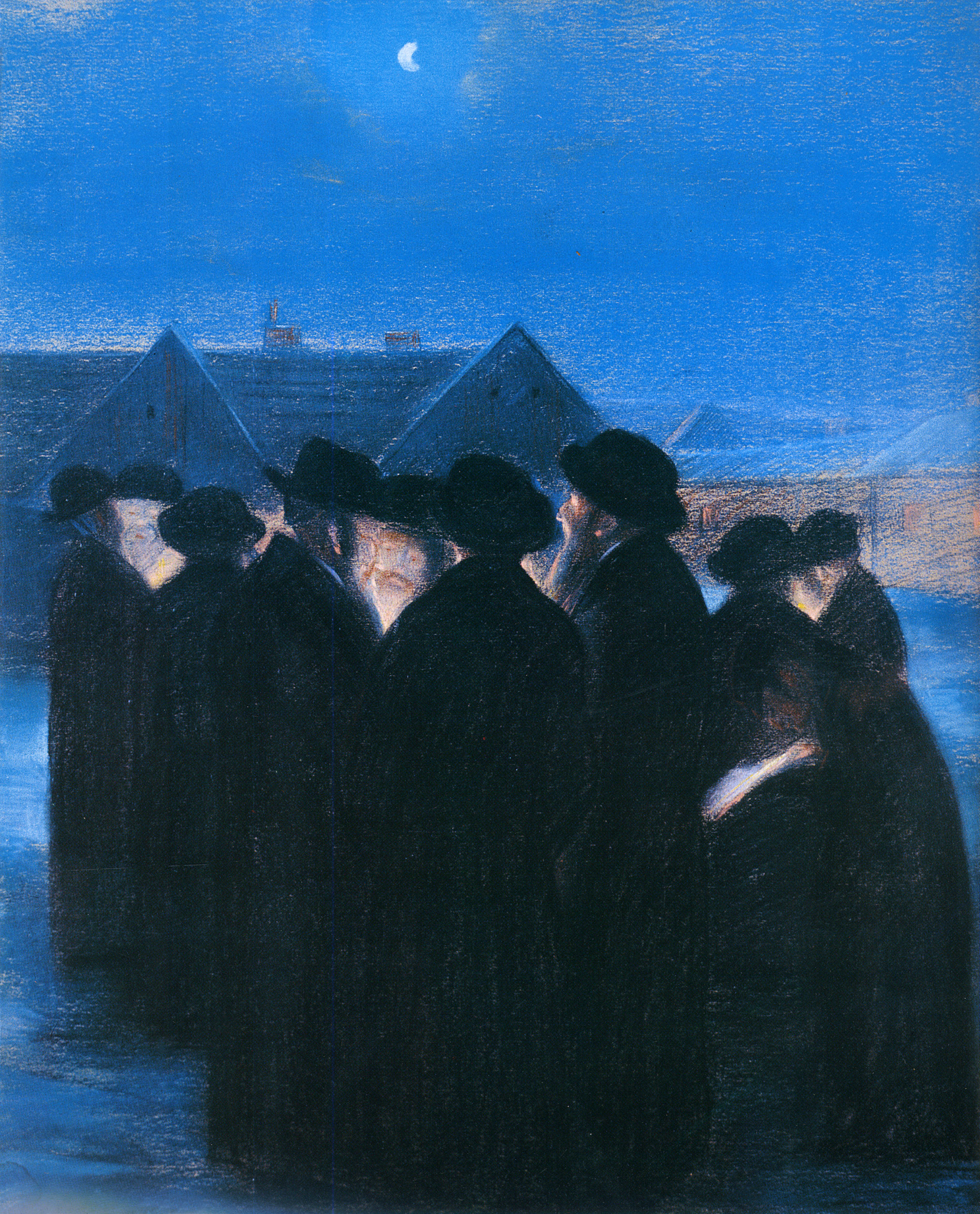
Blessing of the New Moon

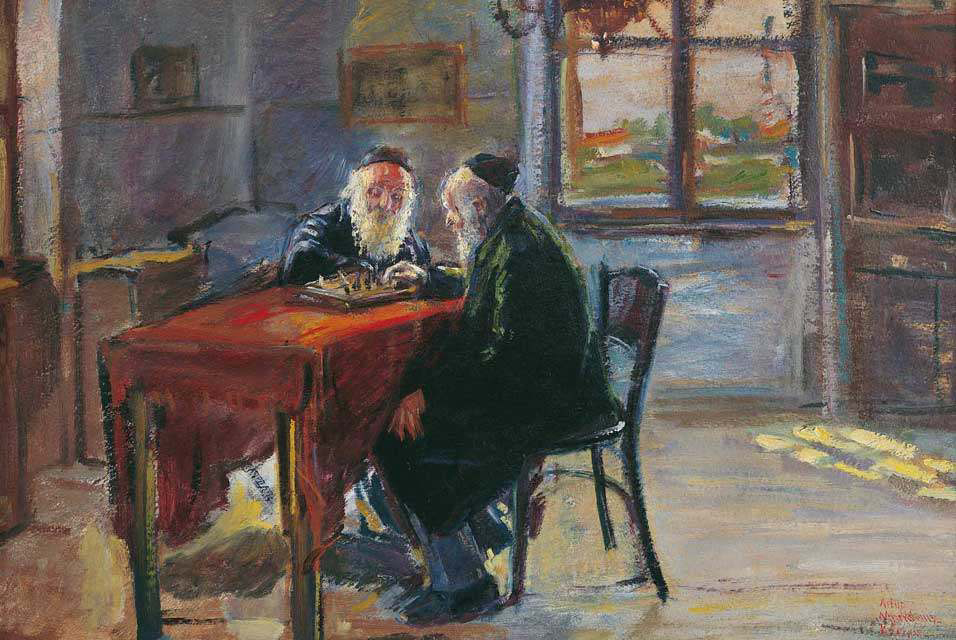
Chess Players
