= Avraham Yehoshua Heschel =

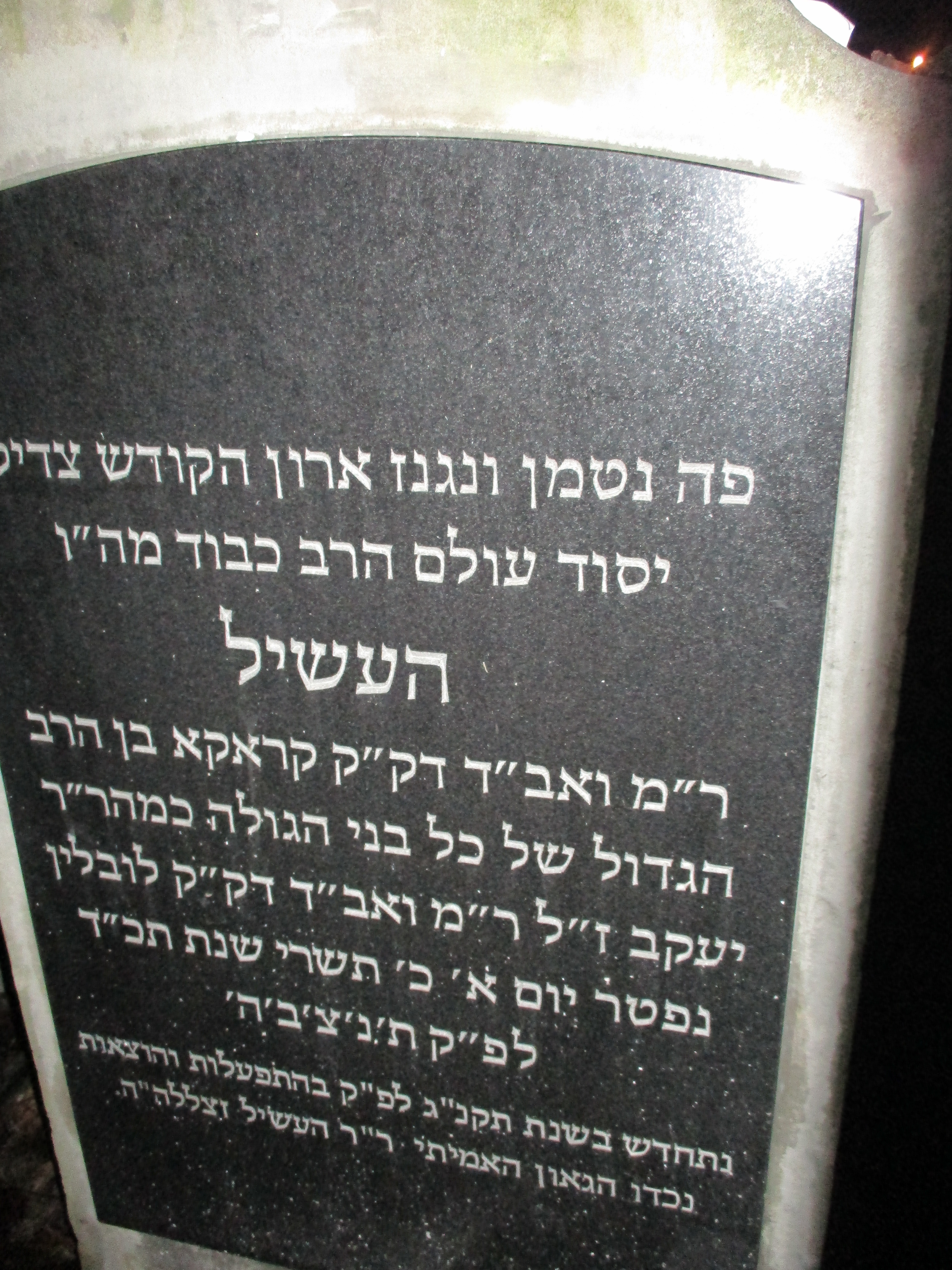
Gravestone of Rabbi Yehoshua Heschel in the Old Jewish cemetery of Krakow

Avraham Yehoshua "Heschel"(or Abraham Joshua) (1595 – 1663) was a renowned rabbi and talmudist in Kraków, Poland.

His father Rabbi Jacob of Lublin was a rabbi in Brisk and then Lublin.

In 1654 Heschel became Chief Rabbi of Kraków, succeeding Yom-Tov Lipmann Heller upon his death.

Subsequent to the Chmielnicki massacres, Heschel was lenient in allowing agunah (women whose husbands were only presumed dead) to remarry.

Heschel's second wife was Dina, the granddaughter of Saul Wahl, who according to folklore was king of Poland for one day.

Heschel's main students are Rabbi David Halevi Segal (Taz), and Rabbi Shabsai Cohen (Shach).

Heschel is buried in the Old Jewish Cemetery of Kraków, also known as the Remuh Cemetery.
