= Ozjasz Thon =

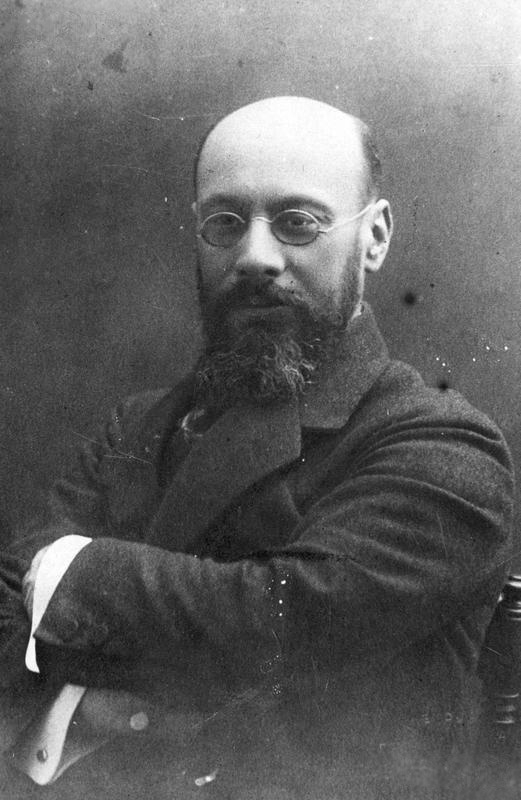
Ozjasz Thon.

Abraham Ozjasz Thon (also Yehoshua Thon; 13 February 1870 – 11 November 1936) was a rabbi, early Zionist, and leader of the Jewish community in Poland.

== Biography ==
Thon was born on 13 February 1870 in Lviv. He studied philosophy and sociology under George Simmel. As a student, he assisted Theodor Herzl in the ideological preparations for the First Zionist Congress.

Thon died on 11 November 1936 in Kraków and is buried in Kraków's New Jewish Cemetery.

== Rabbinic career ==
In 1897, Ozjasz Thon was appointed to the rabbinate of Kraków, a position he held until his death. He was the rabbi of the Tempel Synagogue of the more religiously-liberal constituency within the Jewish community. He promoted a Zionist program despite the overall assimilationist trends prevalent in the Jewish community at that time, and was an adherent of Ahad Ha'Am's school of Jewish identity.

== Literary career ==
In 1897 published a groundbreaking philosophical study of Zionism, Zur geschichtsphilosophischen Begründung des Zionismus. Thon wrote literary and scientific academic works and journalistic essays, and a 1910 work on the philosophical and sociological methods of Herbert Spencer.

== Political career ==
In 1906, Thon made an unsuccessful bid to represent the Jewish National Party in Kolomyya, Eastern Galicia, in the elections to the Austrian parliament. He continued his political activities and expanded them after the First World War. He represented the Western Galician Jewish National Council at the Versailles Peace Conference. In 1919, Thon was elected to the first Sejm and served in the Polish parliament until 1931, where his oratory received a hearing even among antisemitic MPs.
