= Yom-Tov Lipmann Heller =

Bohemian Talmudist (1579–1654)

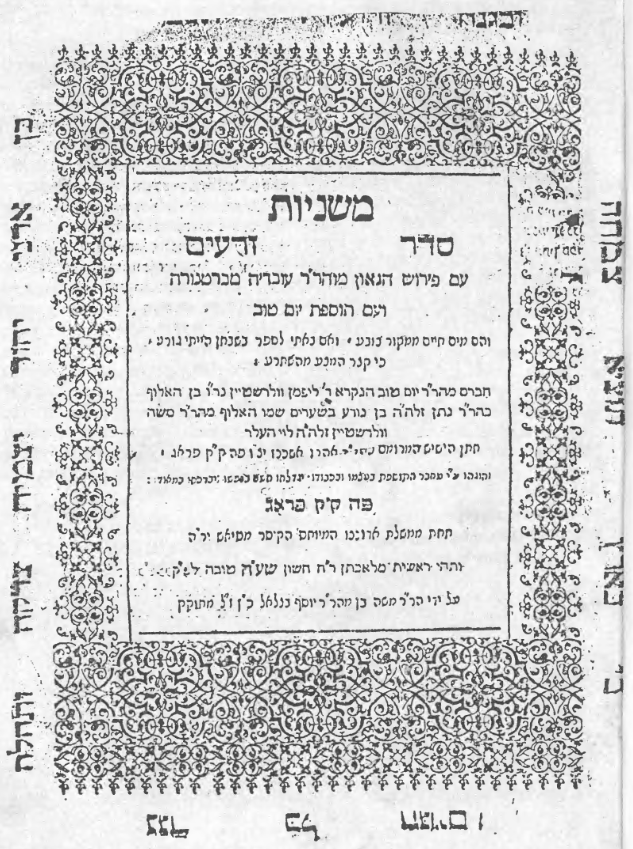
Title page of the Mishna with the Tosefet Yom Tov - printed in Prague during the lifetime of the author

Rabbi Gershon Shaul Yom-Tov Lipmann ben Nathan ha-Levi Heller (c. 1579 – 19 August 1654), was a Bohemian rabbi and Talmudist, best known for writing a commentary on the Mishnah called the Tosefet Yom-Tov (1614–1617). Heller was one of the major Talmudic scholars in Prague and in Poland during the "Golden Age" before 1648.

== Education and rabbinic career ==
After Heller was born in Wallerstein, Bavaria, he was raised by his grandfather, Rabbi Moses Ha-Levi Heller, as his father died at the age of 18 before he was even born. As a teenager Heller was sent to Friedberg, near Wallerstein, where he studied in the Yeshiva of Rabbi Jacob Günzburg. From there he moved to Prague, where he became a disciple of the Maharal, head of the yeshiva of Prague. In 1597, when Heller was scarcely 18 years old, he received a Semicha (appointment) as a Dayan (rabbinic judge) in that city.

In October 1624 Heller was called to the rabbinate of Mikulov, Moravia, and in March 1625, became rabbi of Vienna. Leopoldstadt was then a suburb of Vienna. When he arrived, the Jews of Vienna were scattered throughout the city, not having a central community. Heller obtained the right for the Jews to establish a central Jewish community in Leopoldstadt. He was instrumental in reorganizing the community and drew up its constitution.

From 1627 until 1629, he was Chief Rabbi of Prague.

In 1631, he moved to Ukraine, where he served as rabbi of Nemirov for three years. In 1634, he moved to the larger city of Ludmir (Volodymyr) in Volhynia. During his years in Volhynia and Poland, Heller was among the rabbinic leaders of the Council of Four Lands. In 1640, he worked to obtain the renewal of the synod's decrees against simony in the rabbinate.

Finally, in 1643 he was elected head of the rabbinical court of Kraków, one of the two chief rabbis of that community. Rabbi Yehoshua Heschel of Crakow, the author of Maginei Shelomo, was head of the Yeshiva there. Four years later, Heschel died, and Heller succeeded him and also directed the Yeshiva as well. Heller was chief rabbi of Kraków during the Chmielnicki uprising of 1648, and until his death in 1654.

== Imprisonment ==
In the summer of 1629, Heller was arrested at the order of the imperial court of Holy Roman Emperor Ferdinand II. Heller was accused of insulting Christianity and imprisoned in Vienna. A commission was quickly appointed to inquire into Heller's guilt. He defended himself adroitly, but the commission's verdict was that Heller be sentenced to death. After intervention, the king agreed to impose a fine of 12,000 thalers instead. After negotiations it was reduced to 10,000 thalers (still a huge sum). Afterwards the King declared that Rabbi Heller could no longer serve as a Rabbi. After spending more than a month in prison, Rabbi Heller was released. He then spent two years paying off the fine. In 1631, Heller left Prague and spent the second part of his career in the Polish-Lithuanian Commonwealth.

Several factors account for Heller's imprisonment. His arrest marked the beginning of a brief Habsburg anti-Jewish campaign, encouraged by the Papacy. Heller also had enemies within the Prague Jewish community. On account of the Thirty Years' War, the government had imposed heavy taxes on the Jewish communities of Bohemia, including that of Prague, which had to pay a yearly tax of 40,000 thalers. A commission headed by Chief Rabbi Heller unanimously voted to tax each Jewish family in Prague. The richer the family, the higher the tax. The burden fell mostly upon the rich merchants who could well afford to pay their assessments. However, they complained and demanded a reexamination of the decision. Rabbi Heller and his committee reviewed the problem and concluded that this approach was fair. The committee met with representatives of the merchants' association to explain the sensitive situation facing the Jewish community of Prague. The irate merchants refused to deal with the Qahal which was responsible for delivering the money to the government. Instead, they decided to appeal to the government. In their petition they charged the Chief Rabbi with being an enemy of Christianity. Their proof: "His writings are filled with allegations against the religion of the country." Rabbi Heller was associated with the wealthy leader of the Prague community at that time, Jacob Bassevi. He was an ally of the great general Albrecht von Wallenstein, who also had enemies at the Habsburg court. Heller's relationship with Bassevi and Heller's arrest played a part in larger political machinations there.

== Family ==
Yom-Tov Heller founded a long line of rabbis. His father, Nathan, who died days before he was born, was the son of Rabbi Moses. Heller was married to Rachel, a daughter of a wealthy Prague merchant, Aaron Moses Ashkenazi (Munk). Through his wife he was related to the Horowitz family. On his mother's side, he was related to the Günzburg family; on his father's side, to the Frankel family of Vienna.

Despite his father dying at age 18, Yom-Tov is believed to have had three siblings: brother Joseph d. 1659, sister Perel and another unknown sister. It is possible but unclear whether the addition of Oettingen and Wallerstein to their names means his ancestors had connections by marriage with the noble families of the House of Oettingen-Wallerstein.

Yom-Tov and Rachel probably had 16 children, at least six sons and at least eight daughters. Sons whom he mentions in his works, were: Moses of Prague, Samuel of Nemirow (now Nemirov, Ukraine), Abraham of Lublin (now in Poland), and Leb of Brest-Litovsk (now Brest, Belarus). The daughters of whom we definitely know were: Nechle, Nisel, Doberish, Esther, Rebecca, and Reizel.

Probably his most famous descendant was Aryeh Leib Heller Kahana (b. 1745), known as the K'tzos (after his greatest work, K'tzos Hachoshen). His brother Yehuda Heller Kahana (b. 1738), known as the Kuntres Ha'Sfeikos, often appeared with the K'tzos Hachoshen. Other noted relatives are Solomon Judah Loeb Rapoport (b. 1790), religious scholar, poet, writer whose grandson, Arnold Edler von Porada Rapoport (b. 1840) was a lawyer, parliamentarian, coal mining entrepreneur, and philanthropist.

In commemoration of his imprisonment and his release from prison, Heller established two special days of remembrance for his family and descendants. He established the 5th of Tammuz, the day on which his troubles began, as an annual fast-day, and the 1st of Adar as a day of celebration on the anniversary of his nomination to the rabbinate of Kraków. The reading of the Megillah that Heller wrote, called Megilat Eivah (Scroll of Hostility), that tells the story of his imprisonment and release, became a tradition for the descendants of Rabbi Heller. To this day, they celebrate the story of his life in a special Purim celebration.

In 1984 on the 330th anniversary Yahrzeit of Rabbi Heller's death his autobiographical story of his imprisonment Megillat Eivah and a detailed family tree were published in English by Rabbi C.U. Lipschitz and Dr. Neil Rosenstein under the title, The Feast and The Fast by Moznaim Publishing Corporation, New York and Jerusalem. The book contains 40 pages of charts detailing the family tree and the hundreds of families descended from Rabbi Heller.

== Works and opinions ==
Between 1614 and 1617 Rabbi Heller published a Mishnah commentary in three volumes. It was initially entitled Tosefet Yom Tov, but is now known as Tosfot Yom Tov. The commentary quickly became established as one of the standard commentaries to the Mishnah, and is studied to this day. His commentary is an important complement (tosefet) to the commentary of Bartenura, hence the title.

Heller's major halakhic work was Ma'adanei Yom Tov, a commentary to the summary of the Babylonian Talmud by Rabbi Asher ben Jehiel. Rabbi Asher's summary was often taken by German Jews of Heller's day to be the most authoritative statement of Jewish law, even in preference to the Shulchan Aruch. Heller's introduction to the work endorses that view. Heller's halakhic views, mainly on matters of ritual, are quoted by many later rabbis, especially those of Prague.

Among Heller's many minor works are sermons and responsa. He also wrote two sets of piyyutim. The first set from 1621, commemorates the Defenestration of Prague and the beginning of the Thirty Years' War, and the escape of the Prague Jews from the sack of Prague by Habsburg troops after the Battle of White Mountain in 1620. The second set of poems, written in 1650, commemorate the Cossack massacres of 1648-1649.

Heller was a kabbalist, and even wrote a kabbalistic work, a commentary on Rabbenu Bahya ben Asher, based on the kabbalistic views of Moses Cordovero. But throughout most of his life, Heller was opposed to the popularization of the kabbalah, and the use of kabbalistic reasoning in matters of Jewish law.

Among rabbis of his generation, Heller was exceptionally well versed in the secular sciences. His Talmudic works and his sermons show that he was interested in questions of arithmetic, astronomy, and natural science. His notes on the Giv'at haMoreh, which is itself a commentary on Maimonides' work Moreh Nevuchim written by one of his teachers Joseph ben Isaac ha-Levi, prove he occupied himself with philosophy. He praised the Me'or Einayim of Azariah dei Rossi in spite of the anathema that his master, Maharal, whom he held in great esteem, had launched against the book and its author. His statement on the universal dignity of humanity is also notable, as is his openness to study of works by non-Jews. One of his sermons alludes to the new astronomy of Copernicus and Tycho Brahe.

== Folktales and fictions ==
Since 1881, Heller's Megilat Eivah has typically been published with a second section that is attributed to his son Samuel. Samuel relates the story of Heller's imprisonment and trial from his own point of view. In his version, the Rabbi was helped by the French general Turenne, ambassador of the court of King Louis XIV of France, after Samuel's dramatic life-saving of Turenne's wife and daughter at a park in Vienna, when they were attacked by a raging bull. The anecdote is based on a story by Ludwig Philippson.

Benish Ashkenazi, one of the major characters in the novel Satan in Goray by Isaac Bashevis Singer, is a fictionalized version of Rabbi Heller.

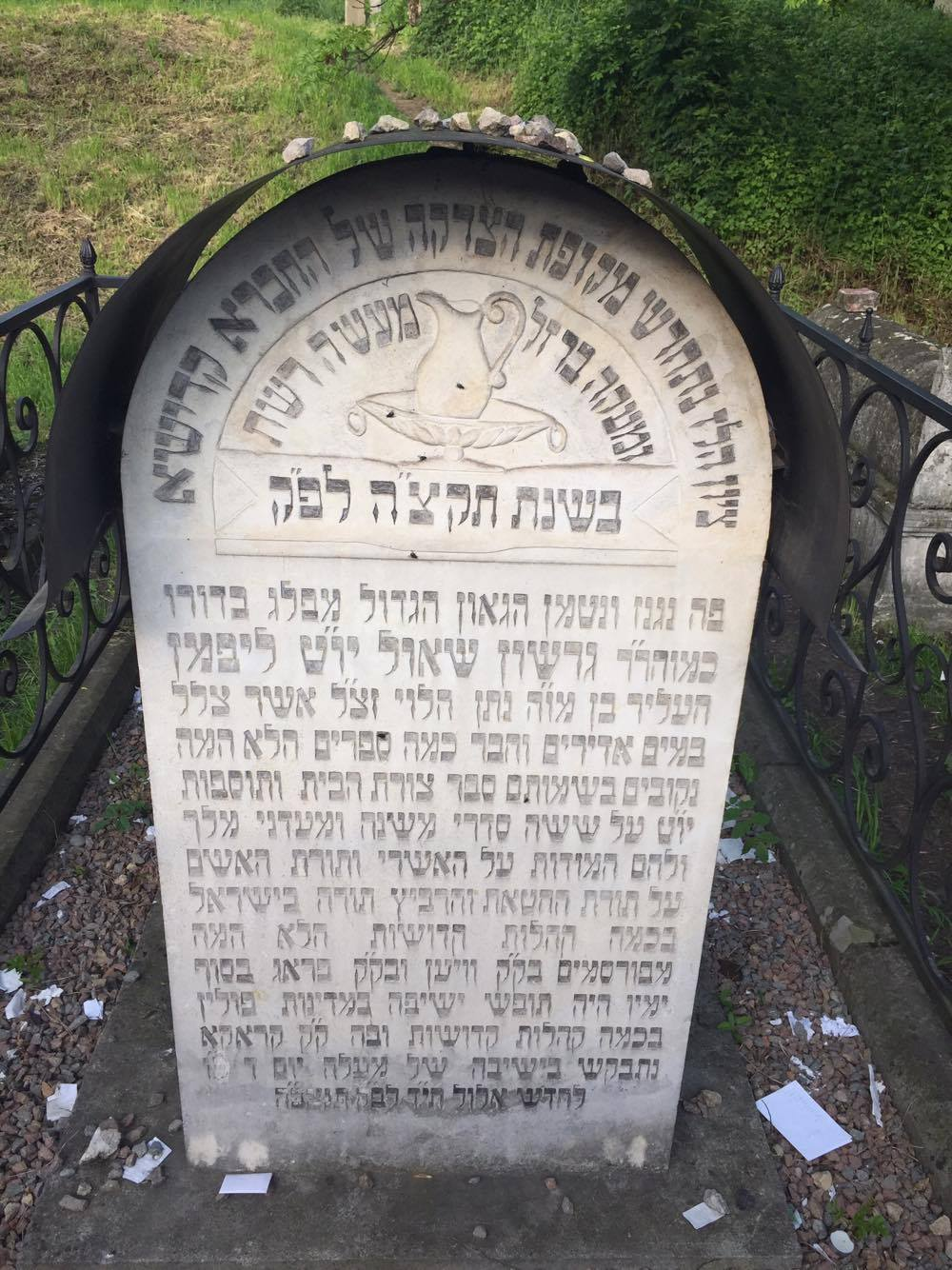
Grave of Yom-Tov Lipmann Heller in Remah Cemetery, Krakow

Heller is also the subject of a number of folktales and legends. One well-known story about him concerns Yossele the Holy Miser, who died in Kraków. Rabbi Heller was asked where to bury him. The town leaders were disgusted by the man's lack of charity, and directed that his body be buried in a far corner of the cemetery. A few days after the miser's death, a great cry was heard in the town, for the poor and hungry were bereft of the miser's secret generosity. The "miser" had been giving charity in the most noble fashion – secretly giving money to the local merchants, who in turn had given food, clothing and money to the poor. When this came to Rabbi Heller's attention, he was visibly shaken. He instructed the town to bury him next to Yossele upon his own death. This explains why Rabbi Heller, one of the greatest of Talmudic scholars, is buried in such an undistinguished section of the cemetery.
