= Nathan Nata Spira =

Polish rabbi and kabbalist (1585–1633)

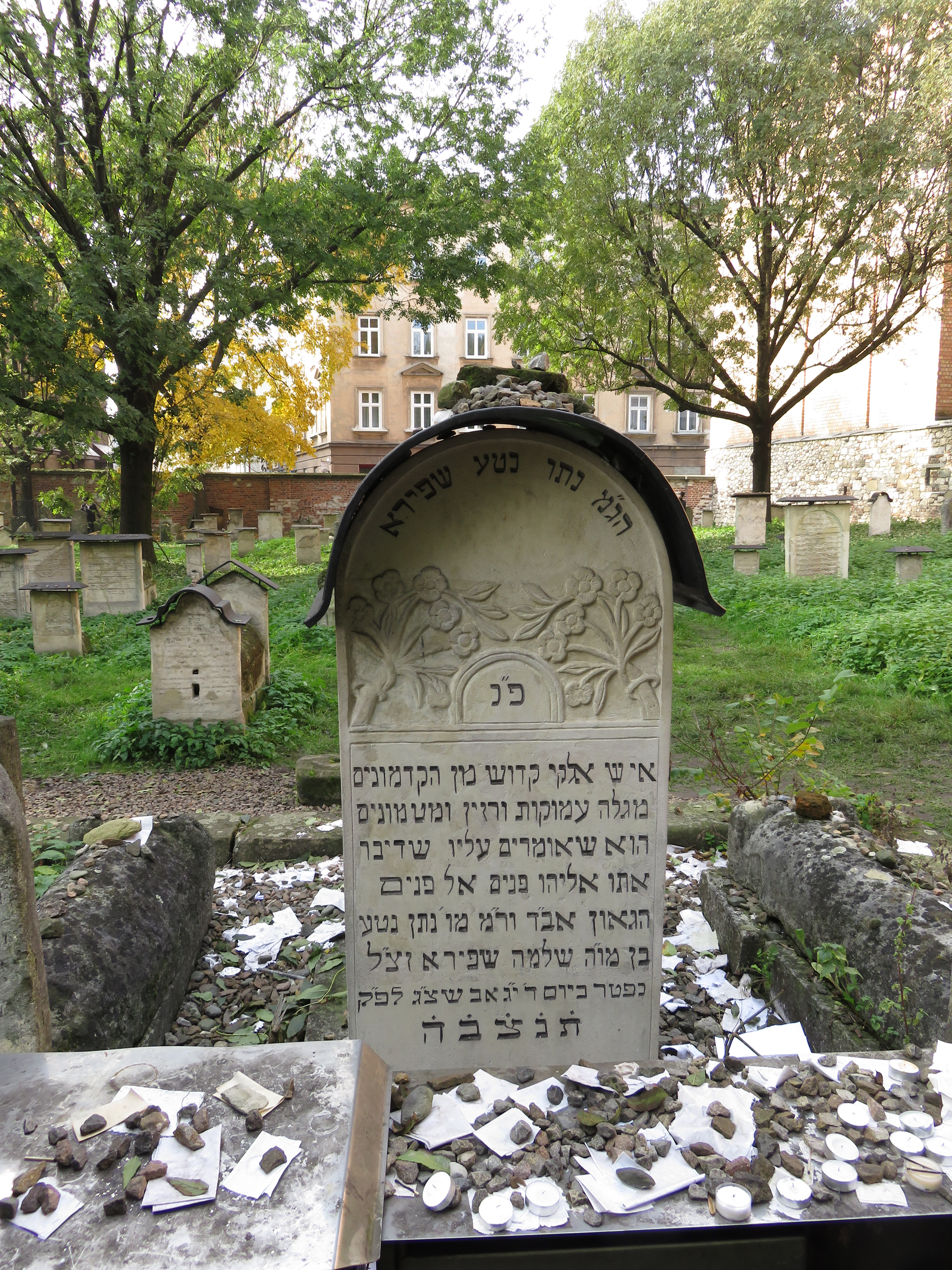
- Rabbi Spira's grave in the Remah Cemetery, Krakow
- Born: 1585
- Died: 20 July 1633 (aged 47–48); Kraków, Poland
- Occupation: Chief Rabbi of Kraków
- Spouse: Roza (Chayes-Altschuler) Spira
- Parent: Solomon Spira

Nathan Nata Spira (Hebrew: נָתָן נָטָע שַׁפִּירָא; (Note: Also spelled Note (Yiddish: נאָטע).) 1585 – 20 July 1633) was a Polish rabbi and kabbalist, who served as Chief Rabbi of Kraków. A student of Meir Lublin, Spira played an important role in spreading Isaac Luria's teachings throughout Poland. Spira was the author of a number of works, most notably the Megaleh Amukot.

== Biography ==
Spira descended from a rabbinical family, which traced its lineage as far back to Rashi, the noted 11th-century French commentator. He was named after his grandfather Nathan Nata Spira, who was rabbi in Hrodna and author of Mevo Shearim (1575) and Imrei shefer (1597). His father was Solomon Spira.

Spira had seven children, three sons and four daughters. While serving as Chief Rabbi of Kraków, Spira refused a salary. He is buried in the Old Jewish cemetery in Kazimierz, Krakow.
