= New Jewish Cemetery, Kraków =

Cemetery in Poland

New Jewish Cemetery Nowy cmentarz żydowski
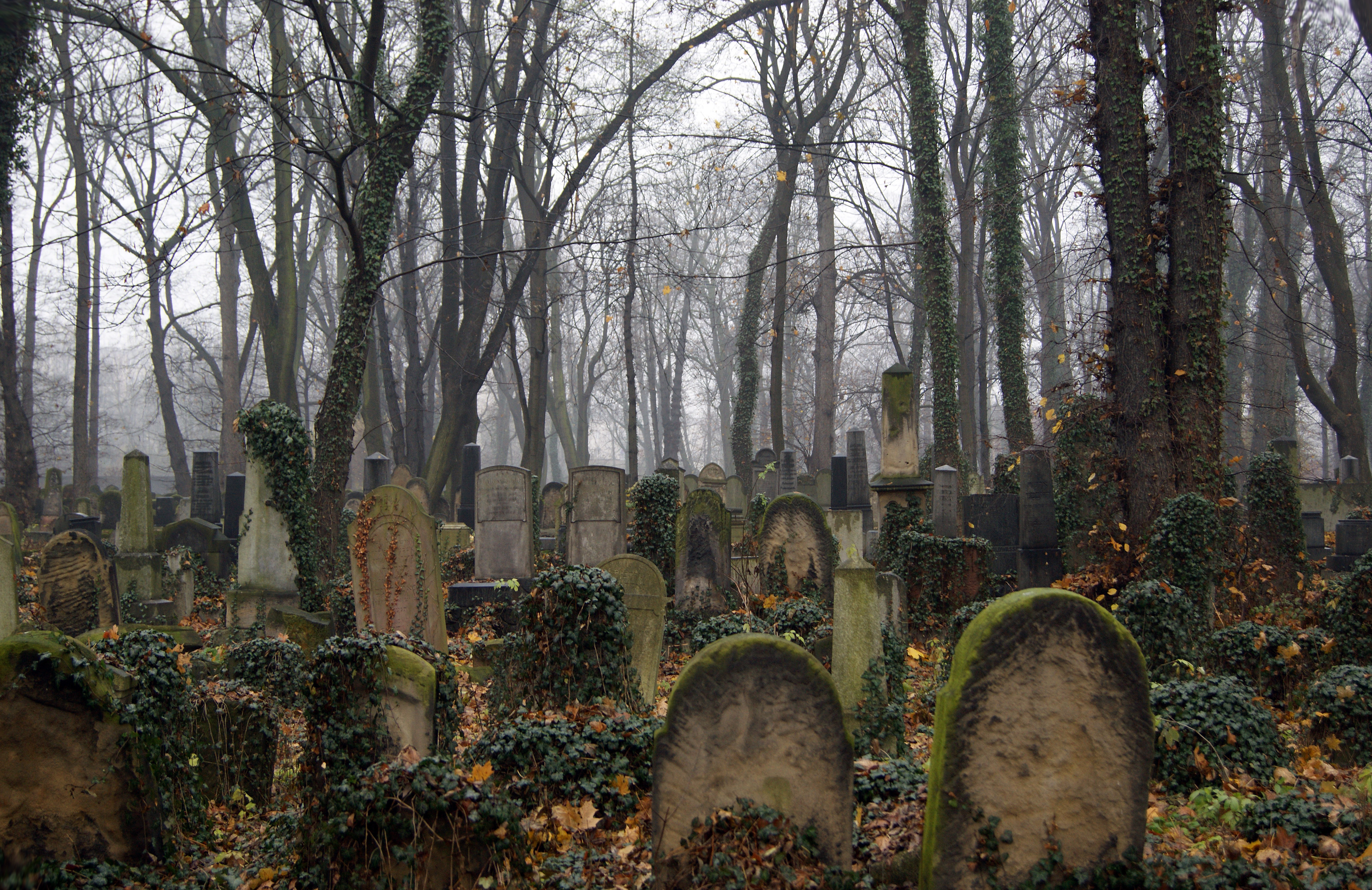
- General view
- Interactive map of New Jewish Cemetery; Nowy cmentarz żydowski

Details
- Established: 1800
- Location: Kraków; 55 Miodowa Street
- Country: Poland
- Coordinates: 50°03′12″N 19°57′07″E
- Type: Jewish cemetery
- Owned by: Jewish Religious Community in Kraków
- Size: 4,5 ha
- No. of graves: Approximately 10,000
- Find a Grave: New Jewish Cemetery; Nowy cmentarz żydowski

Historic Monument of Poland
- Designated: 1994-09-08
- Part of: Kraków historical city complex
- Reference no.: M.P. 1994 nr 50 poz. 418

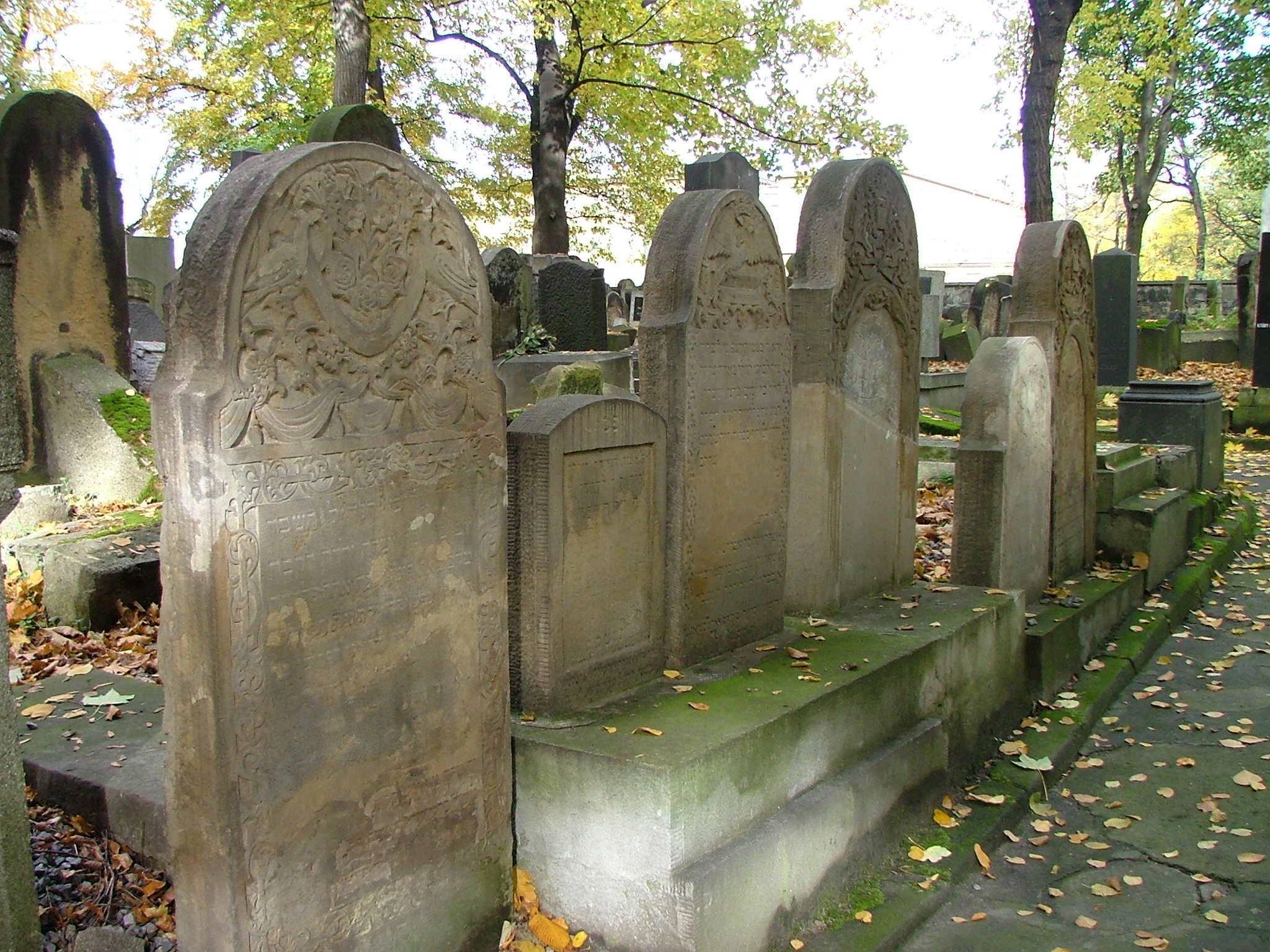
Alleyway between tombs

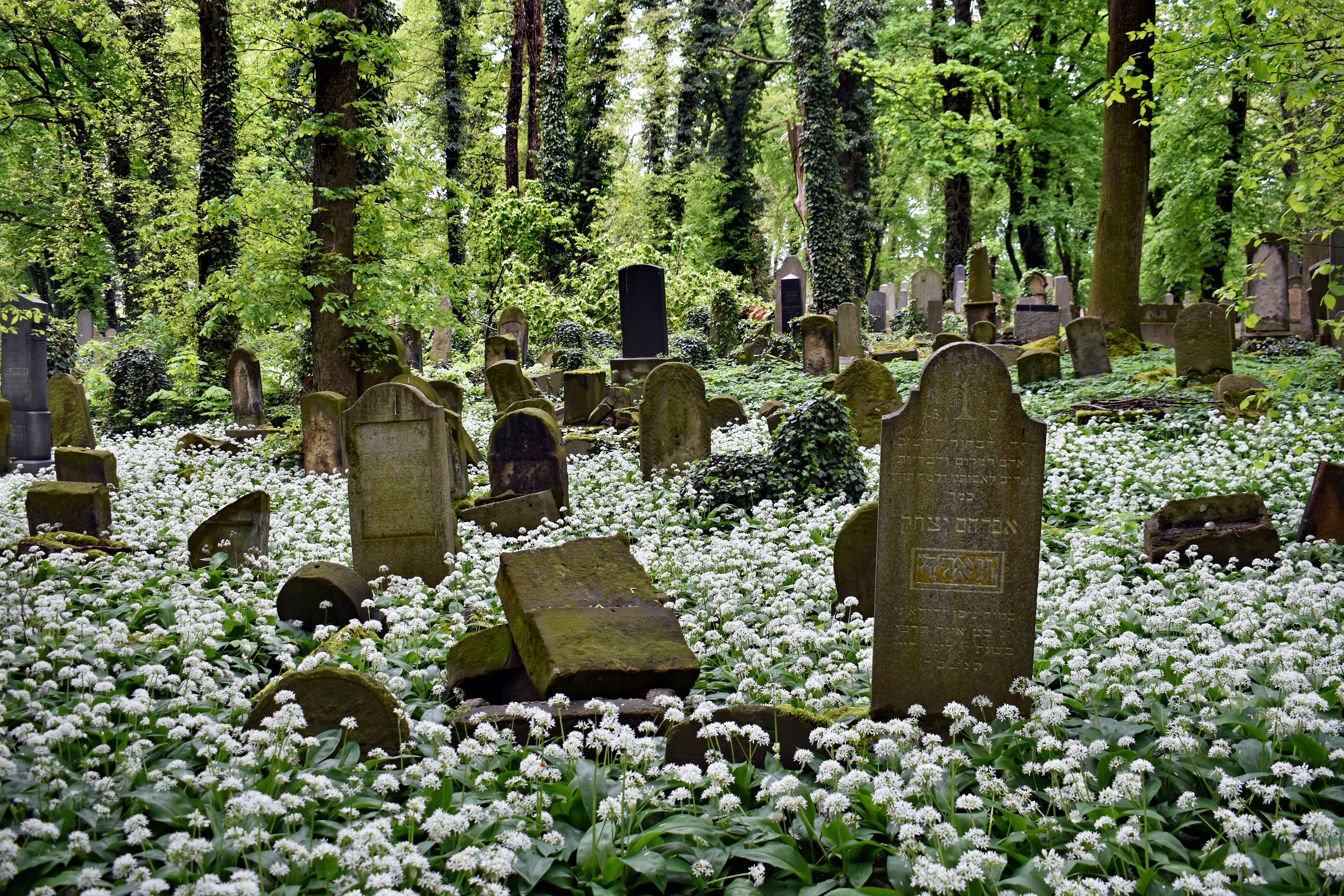
Main view

The New Jewish Cemetery (Polish: Nowy cmentarz żydowski) is a historic necropolis situated on 55 Miodowa Street in Kraków, Poland. It has an area of about 3.1 hectares (7.7 acres). Since 1999, the cemetery is a registered heritage monument. The grounds also feature a well-preserved mortuary.

== History ==
The New Jewish Cemetery was founded in 1800 on grounds purchased by the Jewish Qahal from the Augustinians. It was enlarged in 1836 with additional land purchased from the monks. Following Poland's return to independence, the New Cemetery became nearly full. From 1932 on, burials were directed to a new plot bought in 1926 by the Qahal along Abrahama Street and the one at nearby Jerozolimska Street, both in the Wola Duchacka neighborhood (now part of Podgórze district). These two other cemeteries formed the site of the Kraków-Płaszów concentration camp during the Holocaust and no longer exist. The Jews from the Kraków Ghetto were sent there.

=== World War II ===
Following the Nazi invasion of Poland in World War II, the New Cemetery was closed to outsiders and the Germans sold the most valuable stonework to local masons. Other headstones, as well as slabs, were turned into construction material and used for paving the supply road to the camp, including the courtyard of commandant Amon Göth, who is known for having insisted that the Jews pay for their own executions. Meanwhile, the old bones at the cemetery were often left uncovered and scattered around in what looked like an open-pit mine. Caretaker Pina Ladner, who used to live on premises, was sent to Płaszów beforehand, and shot.

Soon after the war ended, a local civil engineer identified only as Mr. Stendig, likely Jakub Stendig, a camp survivor, (Note: Jakub Stendig was a civil engineer who worked in Płaszów camp as a prisoner architect. He was the son of Anschel Stendig, a wealthy citizen. Prior to the invasion, Stendig had graduated from the Technical Academy in Lwów and the Academy of Fine Arts in Kraków. He survived both Płaszów and Gross-Rosen concentration camps.) recovered many tombstones from the Płaszów camp site, and arranged to have them reinstalled at the New Cemetery.

=== Restoration ===
In 1957, the grounds were renovated with funds from the Joint Distribution Committee. On March 24, 1999, the cemetery, including the 1903 mortuary, were entered into the register of historical monuments of Kraków.

The New Jewish Cemetery features a renovated brick mortuary hall built in 1903, as well as the postwar lapidary memorial fitted with old headstones and crowned with a block of black marble. The cemetery contains over 10,000 tombs, the oldest dating from 1809. There are many monuments commemorating the death of Jews killed during the Holocaust.

== Notable individuals buried at the cemetery ==
Those buried at the New Jewish Cemetery of Kraków include:

Rabbis

- Chaim Arie Leibusz Horowitz (d. 1904), Rabbi of Krakow
- Aleksander Sender Herszel Landau (d. 1856), Rabbi of Krakow
- Cwi Hirsz Dawid ha-Lewi (d. 1831), Rabbi of Krakow
- Josef Nechemia Kornitzer (d. 1933), Rabbi of Krakow
- Szymon Schreiber (d. 1883), Rabbi of Krakow
- Ozjasz Thon (d. 1936), Rabbi of the Tempel Synagogue, Member of Parliament for the Sejm of the Republic of Poland

Tzadiks and Jewish mystics

- Aron Elimelech Szneur Zalman z Krosna (d. 1923), Tzadik
- Aron Epstein (d. 1881), Tzadik
- Kalonimus Kalman Epstein (d. 1832), Tzadik
- Szlomo Zalman z Wielopola (d. 1857), Tzadik
- Samuel Teitelbaum (d. 1888), Rabbi of Gorlice

Members of the beth din (rabbinical court)

- Mosze Jaakow Dembitzer (d. 1863), Dayan of the city of Kraków
- Pinchas Elijahu Dembitzer (d. 1920), Dayan of Kraków
- Abraham Golds (d. 1825), Dayan of Kraków
- Abraham Jener (d. 1876), Dayan of Kraków
- Jehuda Liber Korngold (d. 1811), Dayan of Kraków
- Akiba Kornitzer (d. 1892), Dayan of Kraków
- Samuel Kornitzer (d. 1941), Dayan of Kraków
- Saul Rafael Landau (d. 1854), Dayan of Kraków
- Icchak Cwi Hirsz Lemler (d. 1824), Dayan of Izaak Synagogue
- Mosze Elijahu Neimenc (d. 1838), Dayan of Kraków
- Meszulam Feiwel Stern (d. 1837), Dayan of Kraków

Prominent others

- Ignacy Akerman (d. 2007), Jewish community activist
- Aleksander Ameisen (d. 1961), medical doctor, chess player
- Zofia Ameisen (d. 1967), professor of Jagiellonian University, custodian of the Jagiellonian Library
- Izaak Bauminger (d. 1930), industrialist, Qahal activist
- Róża Berger (d. 1945), the only victim of Kraków pogrom
- Daniel Dawid Bertram (d. 2009), the last member of Semikhah
- Jehuda Birnbaum (d. 1917), president of Qahal

- Maria Bujańska (d. 1999), writer, pianist
- Jakub Drobner (d. 1896), doctor, member of January Uprising
- Maria Einhorn-Susułowska (d. 1998), psychologist
- Irena Fessel (d. 2008), translator, scientist
- Maksymilian Fiszgrund (d. 1978), journalist, Qahal activist
- Abram Fogel (d. 1984) – kantor at Remuh Synagogue
- Jerzy Gert (d. 1969), composer, conductor
- Mieczysław Goldsztajn (d. 2001), neurologist
- Jan Goślicki (d. 2006), essayist, translator
- Maurycy Gottlieb (d. 1879), prominent painter
- Henryk Halkowski (d. 2009), historian, publicist
- Chaim Hanft (d. 1951), painter, sculptor and illustrator
- Czesław Jakubowicz (d. 1997), president of the Jewish Community
- Maciej Jakubowicz (d. 1979), president of Krakow Congregation
- Nesanel Kichler (d. 1983), labor activist
- Ignacy Krieger (d. 1889), pioneer of Polish photography
- Józef Kwiatek (d. 1910), journalist, socialist activist
- Stanisław Lack (d. 1909), poet, literary critic
- Abraham Lesman (d. 1984), the last kantor of Tempel Synagogue
- Aron Marcus (d. 1916), cofounder of Orthodox Zionism
- Artur Markowicz (d. 1934), painter, graphic artist
- Józef Oettinger, professor of Jagiellonian University
- Maria Orwid (d. 2009), psychiatrist
- Szymon Platner (d. 1994), the last Jewish survivor from Brzesko
- Ferdynand Rajchman (d. 1999), classical philologist
- Maksymilian Rose (d. 1937), neurologist
- Józef Rosenblatt, professor of Jagiellonian University
- Ignacy Rosenstock (d. 1935), editor-in-chief of "Przegląd Sportowy"
- Szymon Samelsohn (d. 1881), president of Krakow Congregation
- Józef Sare (d. 1929), architect, president of Krakow, Member of Parliament
- Mieczysław Staner (d. 2003), writer, academic
- Samuel Tilles (d. 1937), president of Krakow Congregation
- Jonatan Warschauer (d. 1880), philanthropist, medical doctor
- Maurycy Wiener (d. 1990), attorney, president of TSKŻ
- Renata Zisman (d. 1999), pianist, pedagogue

== Picture gallery ==
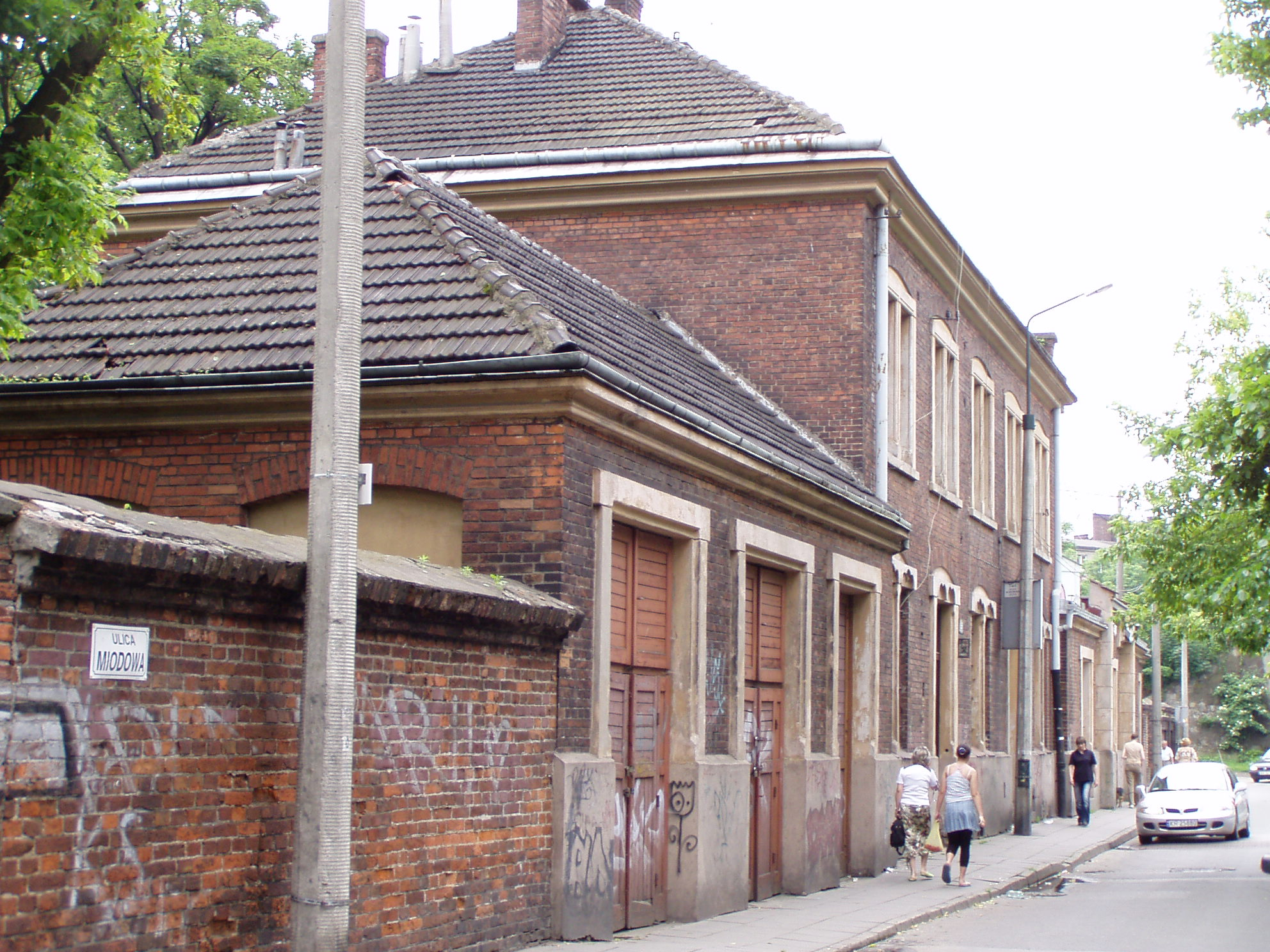
Street view

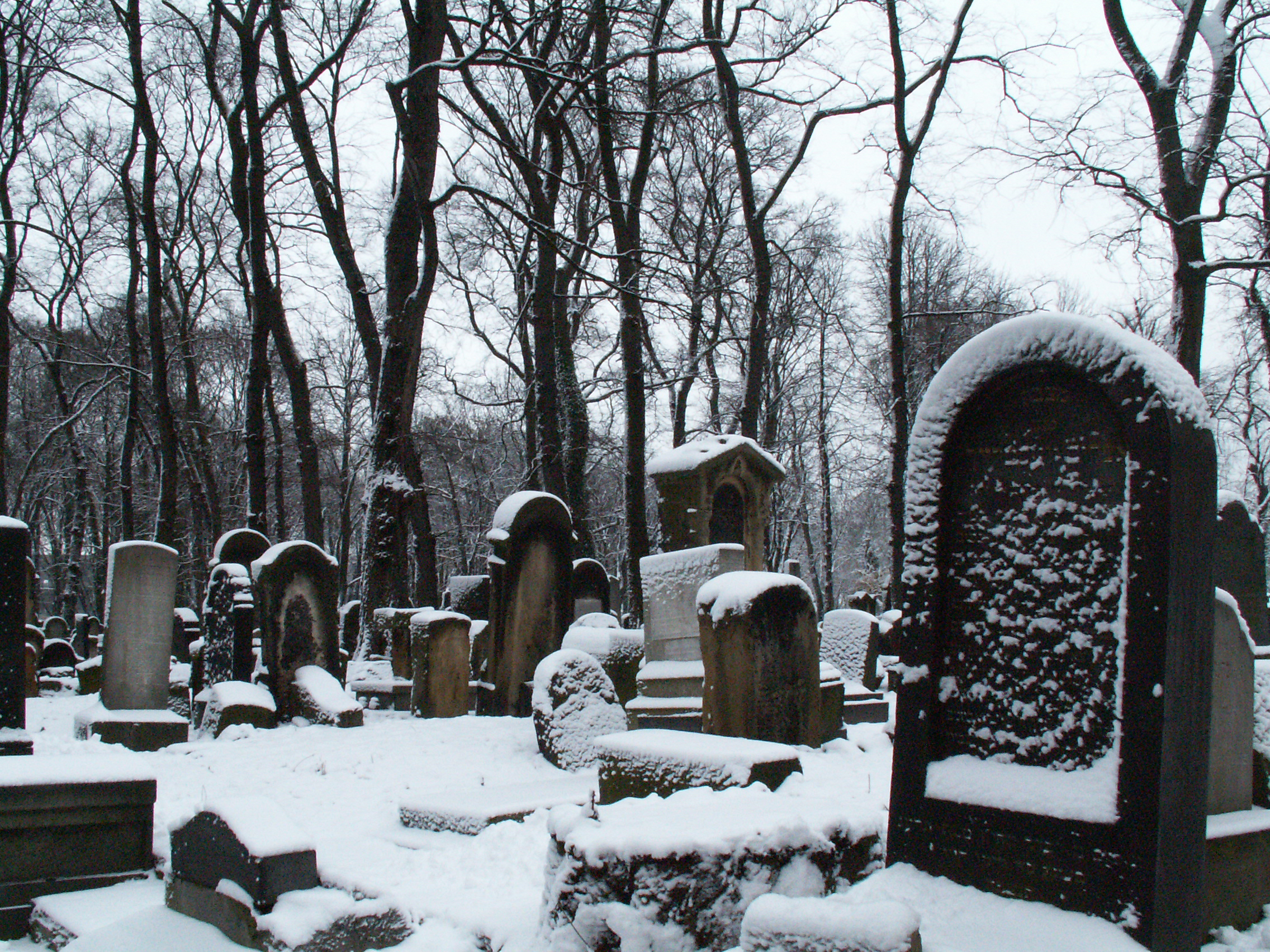
In winter

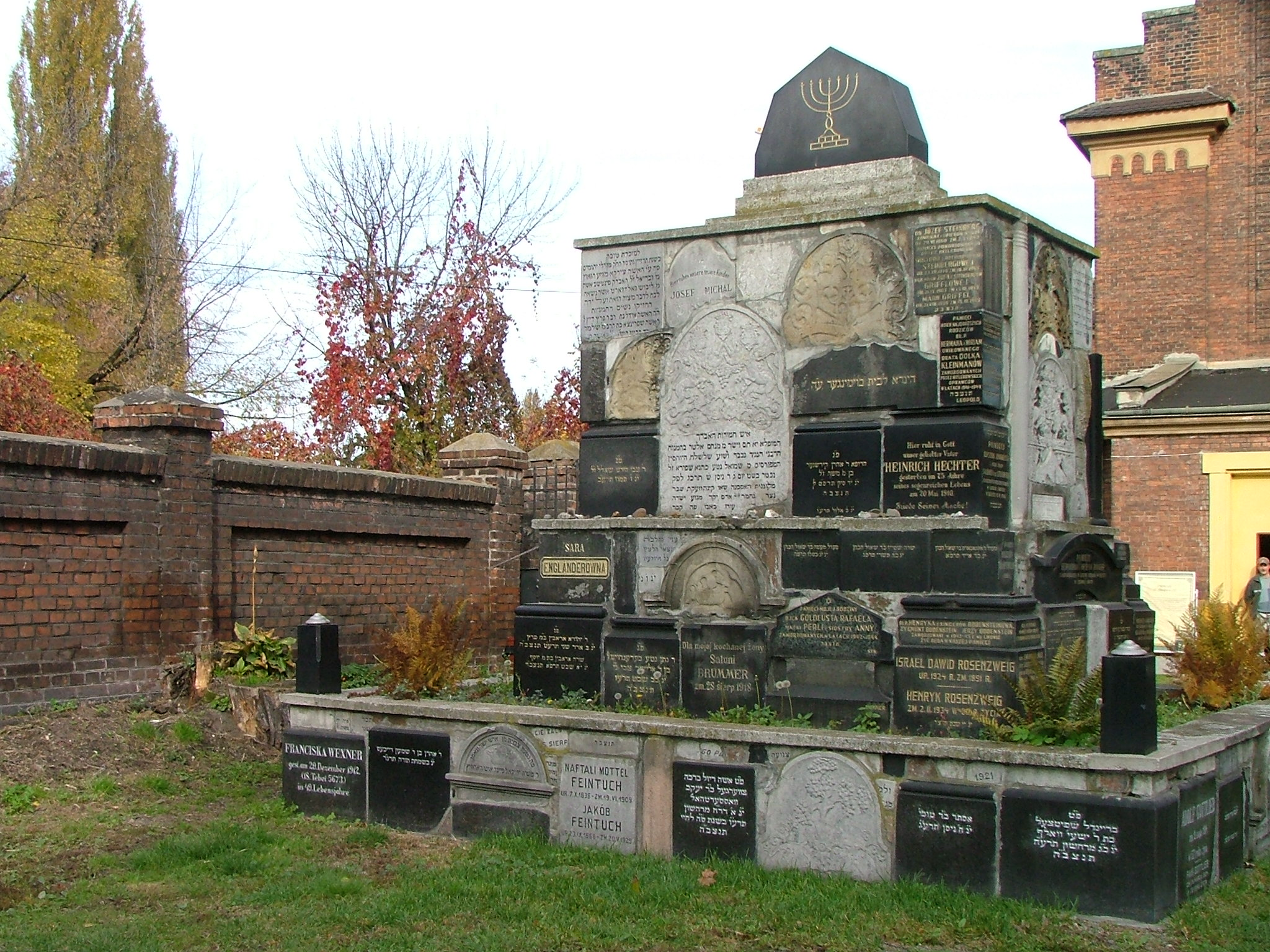
Tombstone memorial

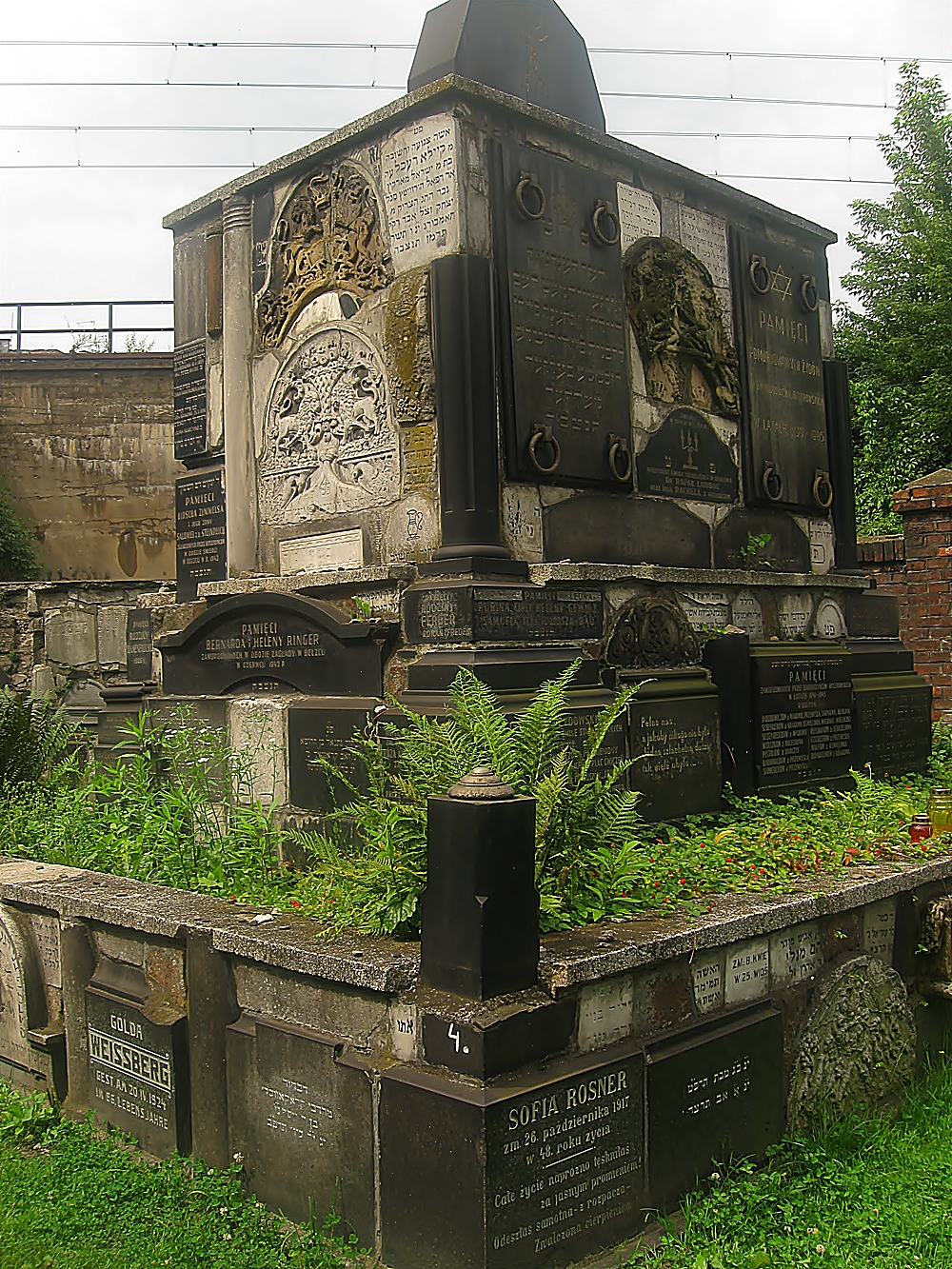
Tombstone memorial

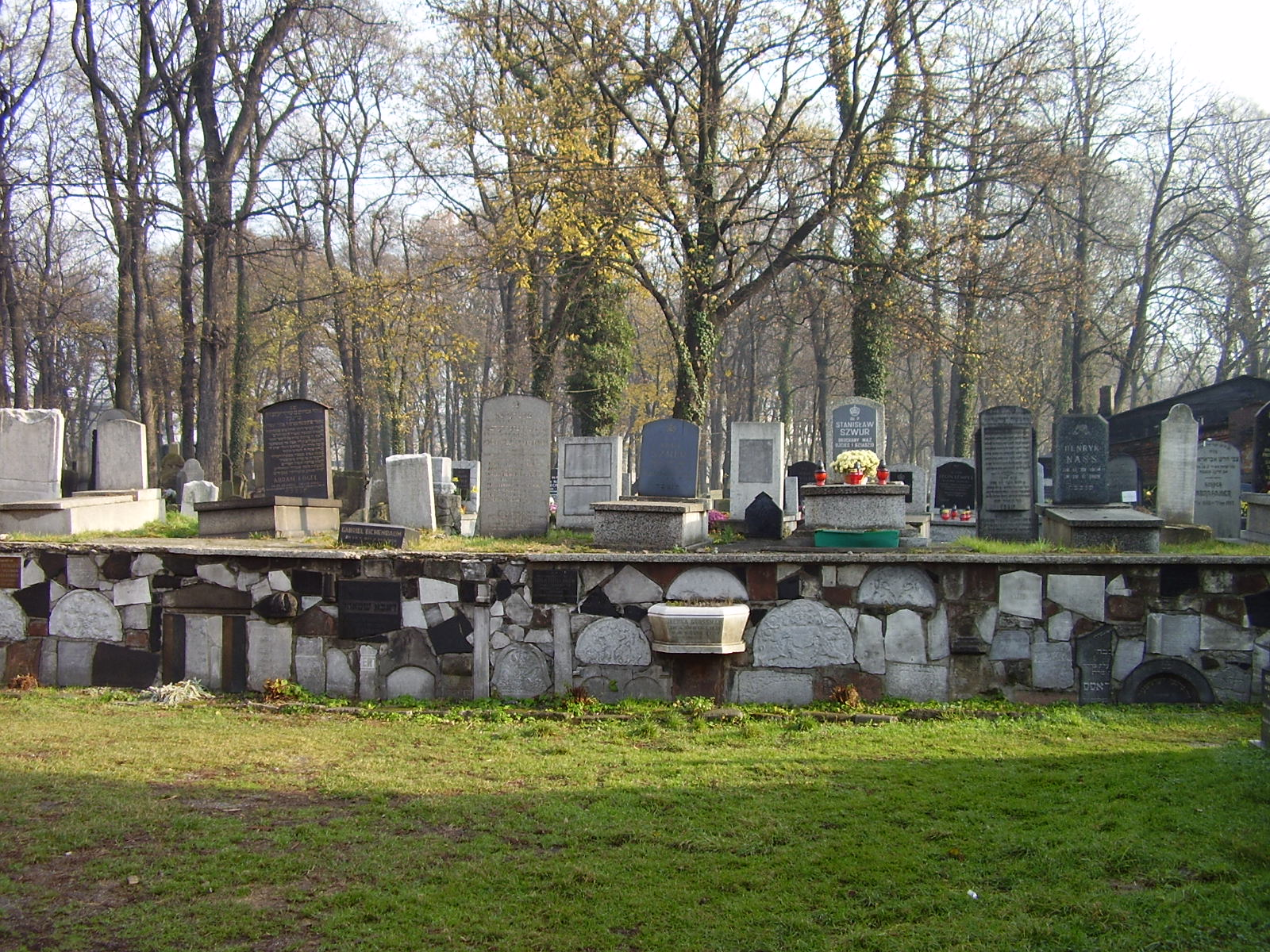
Panoramic view

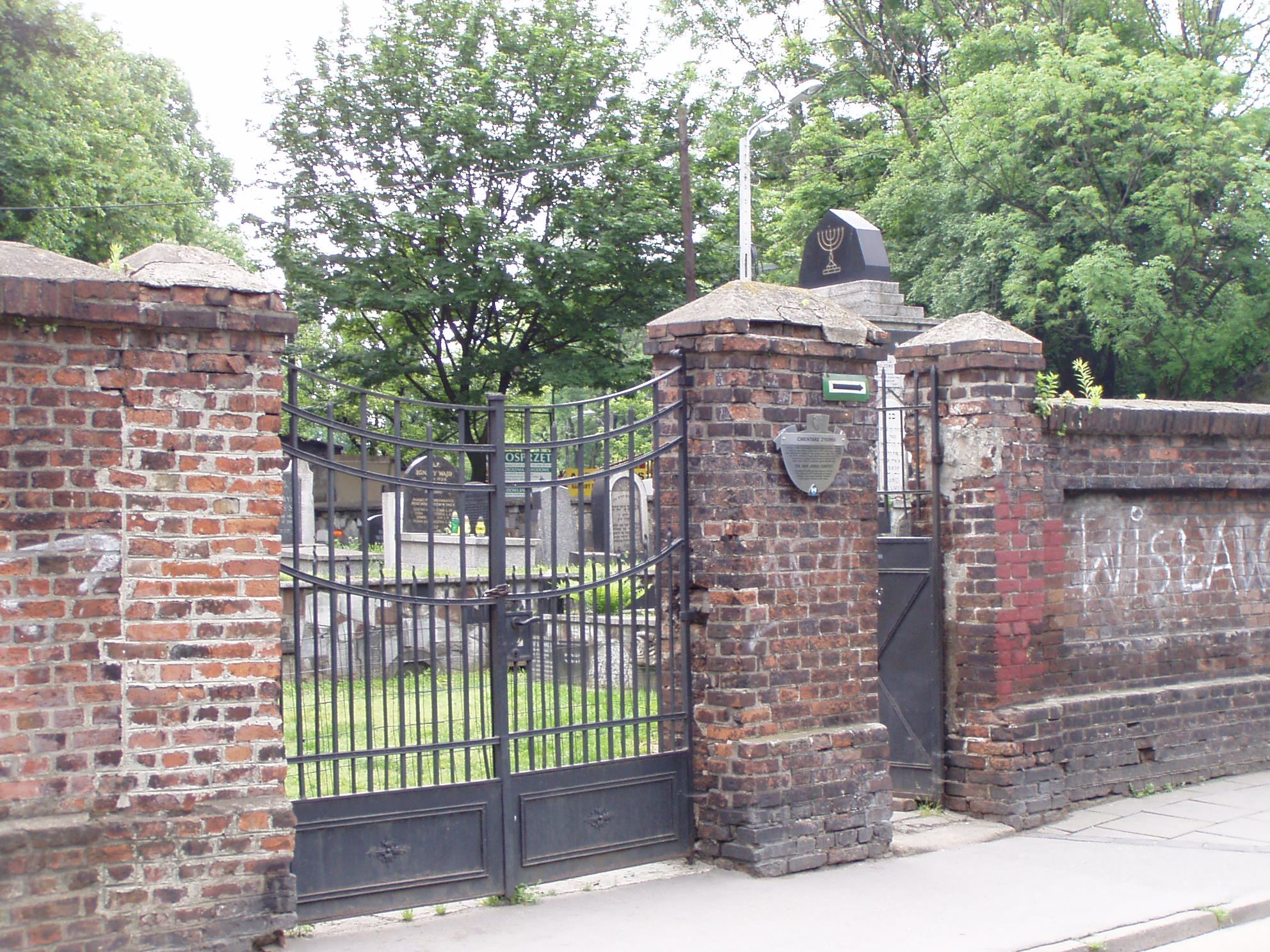
The funeral gate

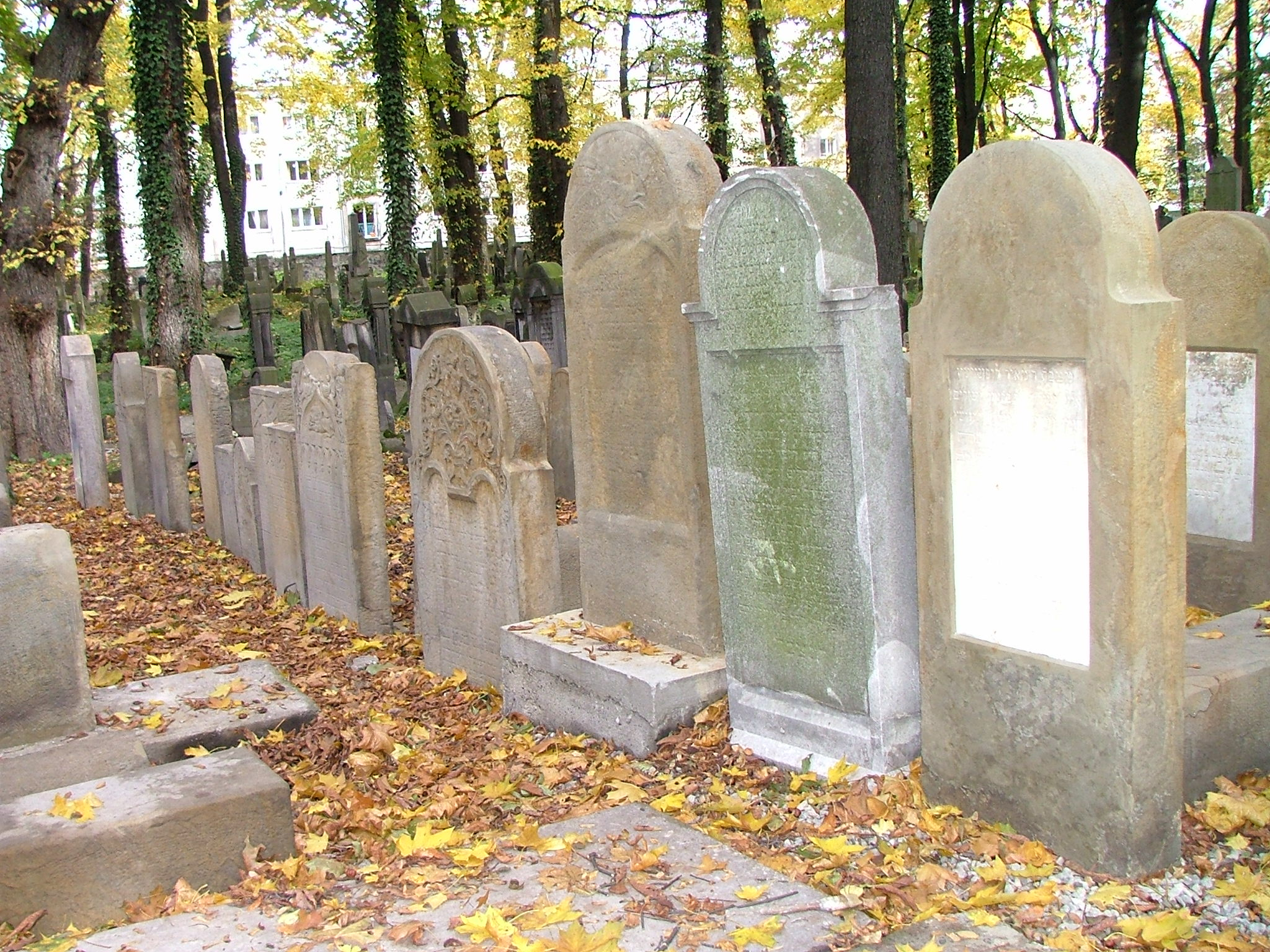
Alleyway between tombs

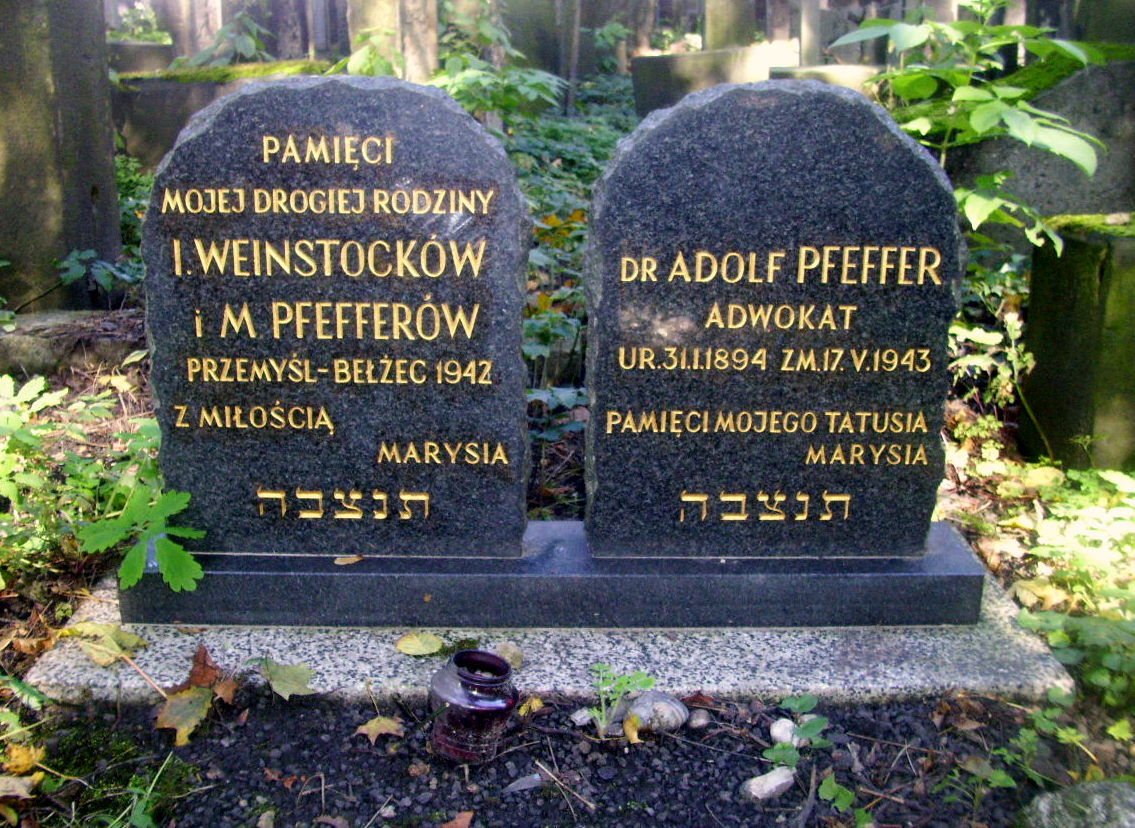
Symbolic graves

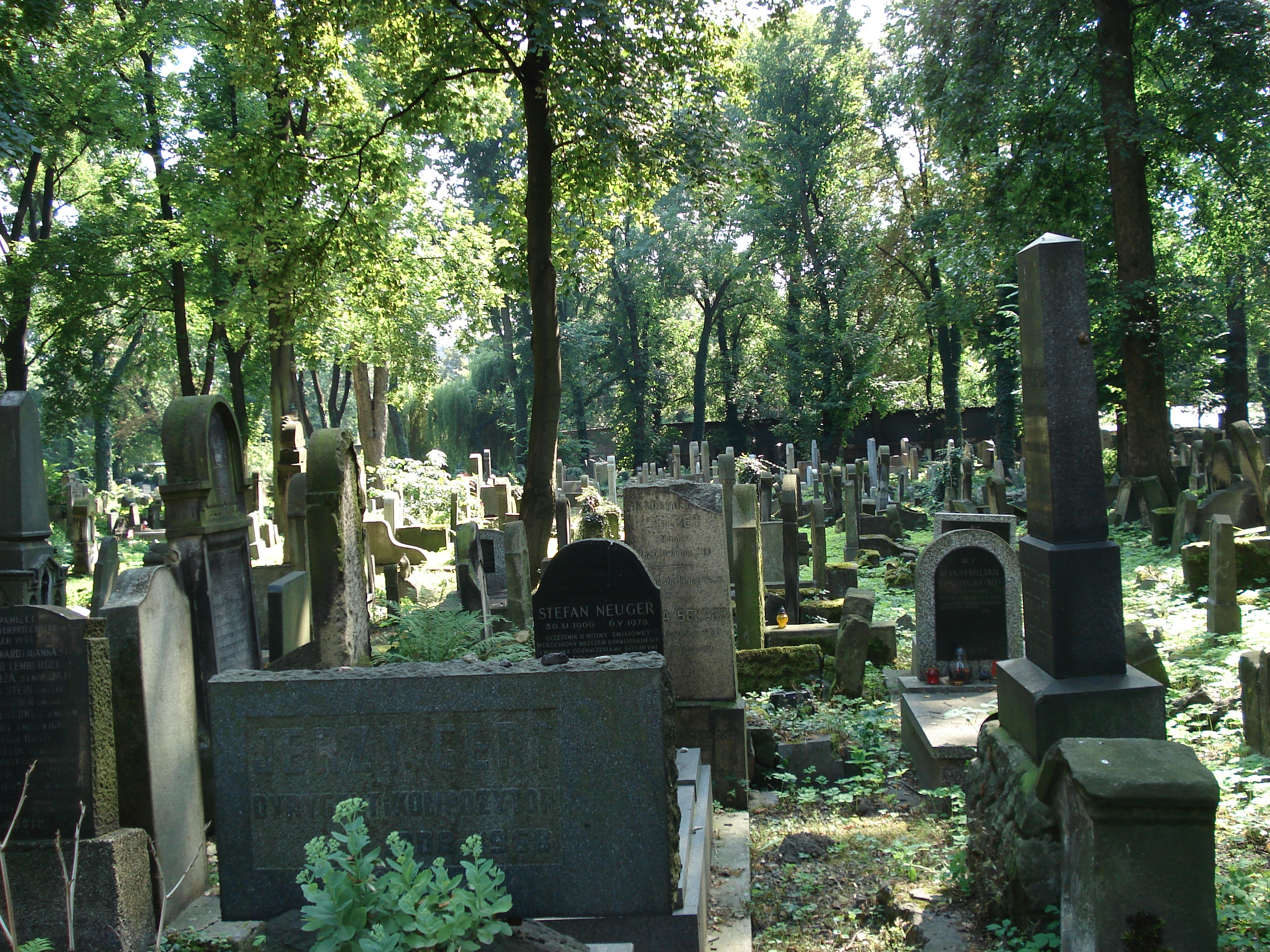
View in summer

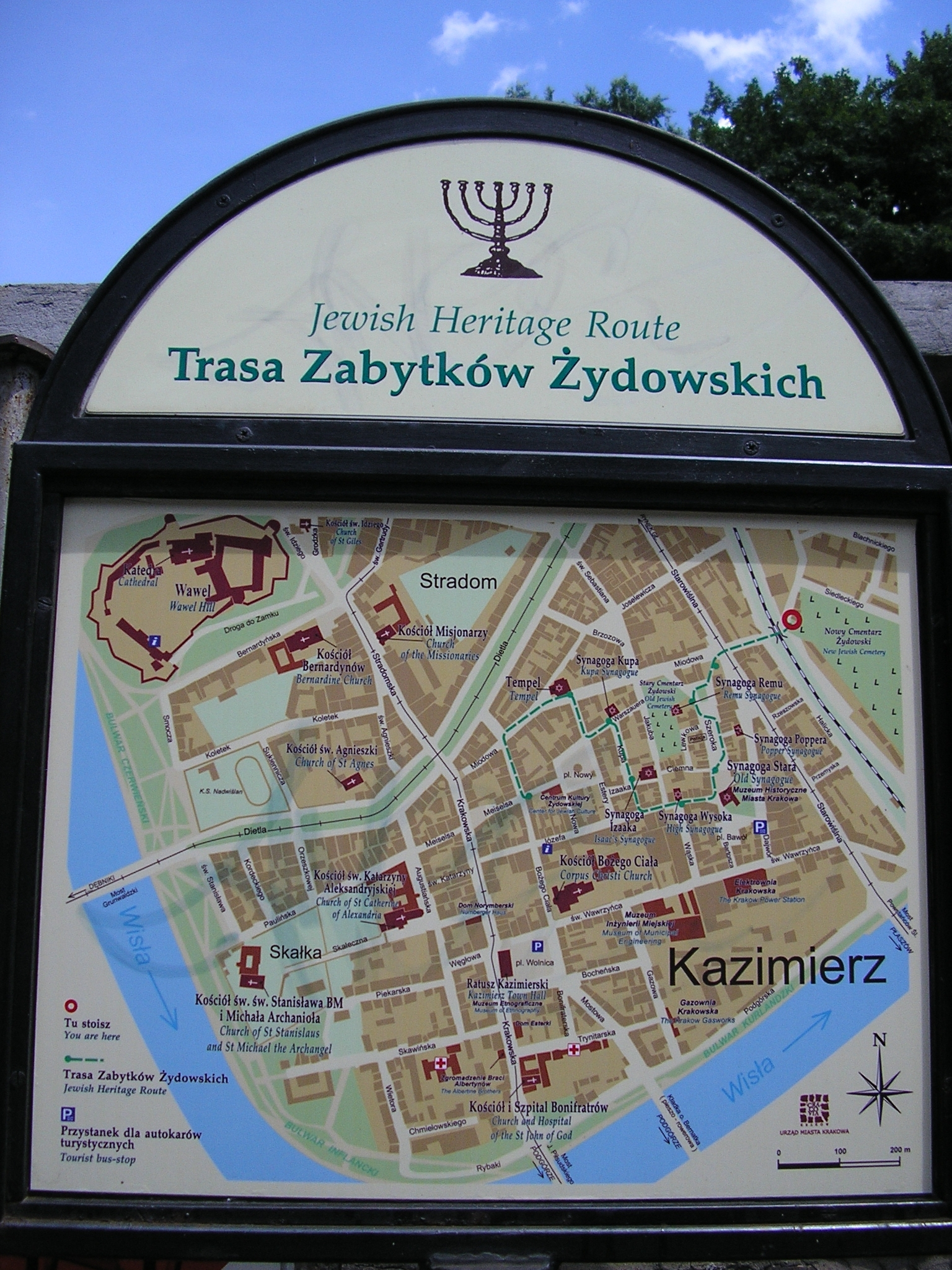
City map of Jewish heritage

== See also ==
- Remuh Cemetery known also as the Old Jewish Cemetery of Kraków
- Rakowicki Cemetery, the main necropolis of the city of Kraków
