= Pinchas Shapiro of Koretz =

Hasidic rabbi

Rabbi Pinchas Shapiro of Koretz

Personal life
- Born: 1726 Shklow, Byelorussia, Polish–Lithuanian Commonwealth
- Died: September 10, 1791 (aged 64–65) Shepetivka, Polish–Lithuanian Commonwealth
- Children: 4
- Parents: Avraham Abba Shapiro (father); Sora Rochel Shapiro (mother)

Religious life
- Religion: Judaism

Jewish leader
- Yahrtzeit: 10 Elul 5551
- Residence: Koretz, Volhynia

Pinchas Shapiro of Koretz (Hebrew: פִּנְחָס בֵּן אַבְרָהָם אַבָּא שַׁפִירָא מִקוֹרִיץ; 1726 – 10 September 1791) was a Lithuanian Hasidic rabbi, theologian, and disciple of the Baal Shem Tov.

== Biography ==
Born in Shklov, Shapiro was the son of Avraham Abba Shapiro and Sora Rochel Shapiro. His father was a descendant of Nathan Nata Spira, the author of Megaleh Amukot.

He had 4 children. Meir Shapiro was a 5th generation descendant of Shapiro.

Originally of Lithuanian background, Shapiro's family was against Hasidic Judaism; when they moved to the town of Wohlin, his father became a student of the Baal Shem Tov, the founder of the hasidic movement. Shapiro also followed the Baal Shem Tov, and became one of his important disciples.

Shapiro's students included the grandson of the Baal Shem Tov, Boruch of Medzhybizh.

In 1790, Shapiro attempted to move to Israel, to Safed. He died on the way and was buried in Shepetivka.
