= List of people from Kraków =

Coat of arms of the city of Kraków

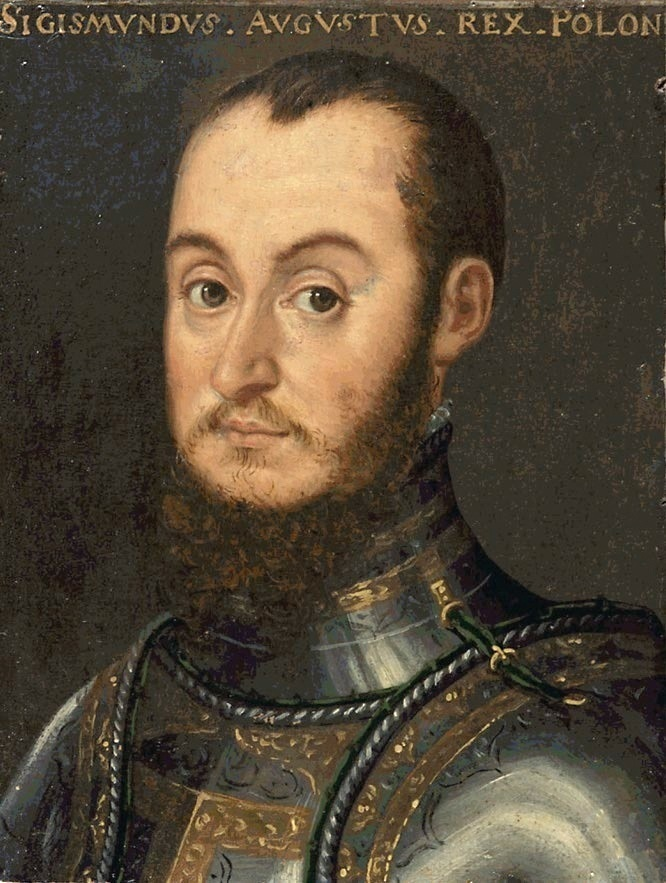
Sigismund II Augustus

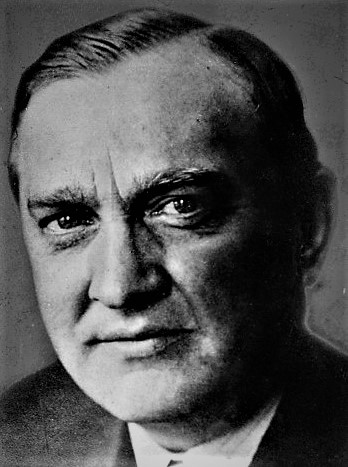
Stefan Banach

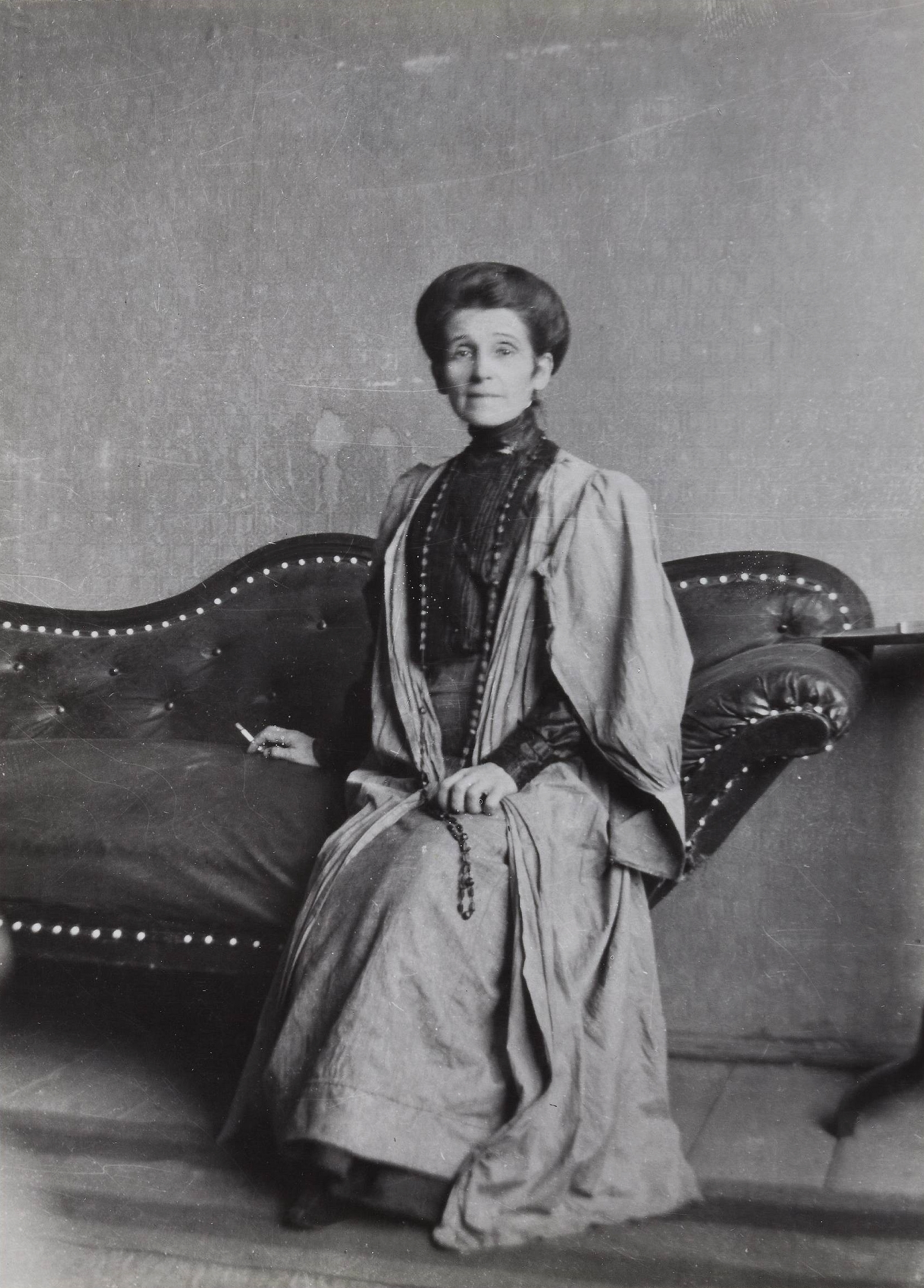
Olga Boznańska

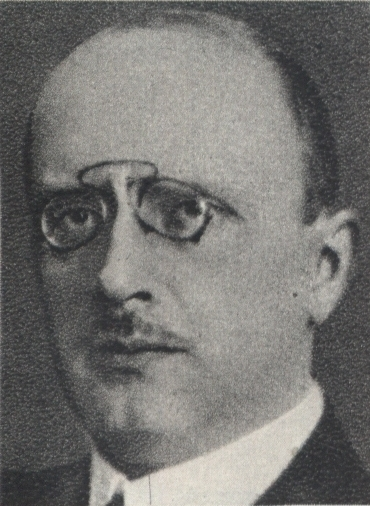
Stefan Bryła

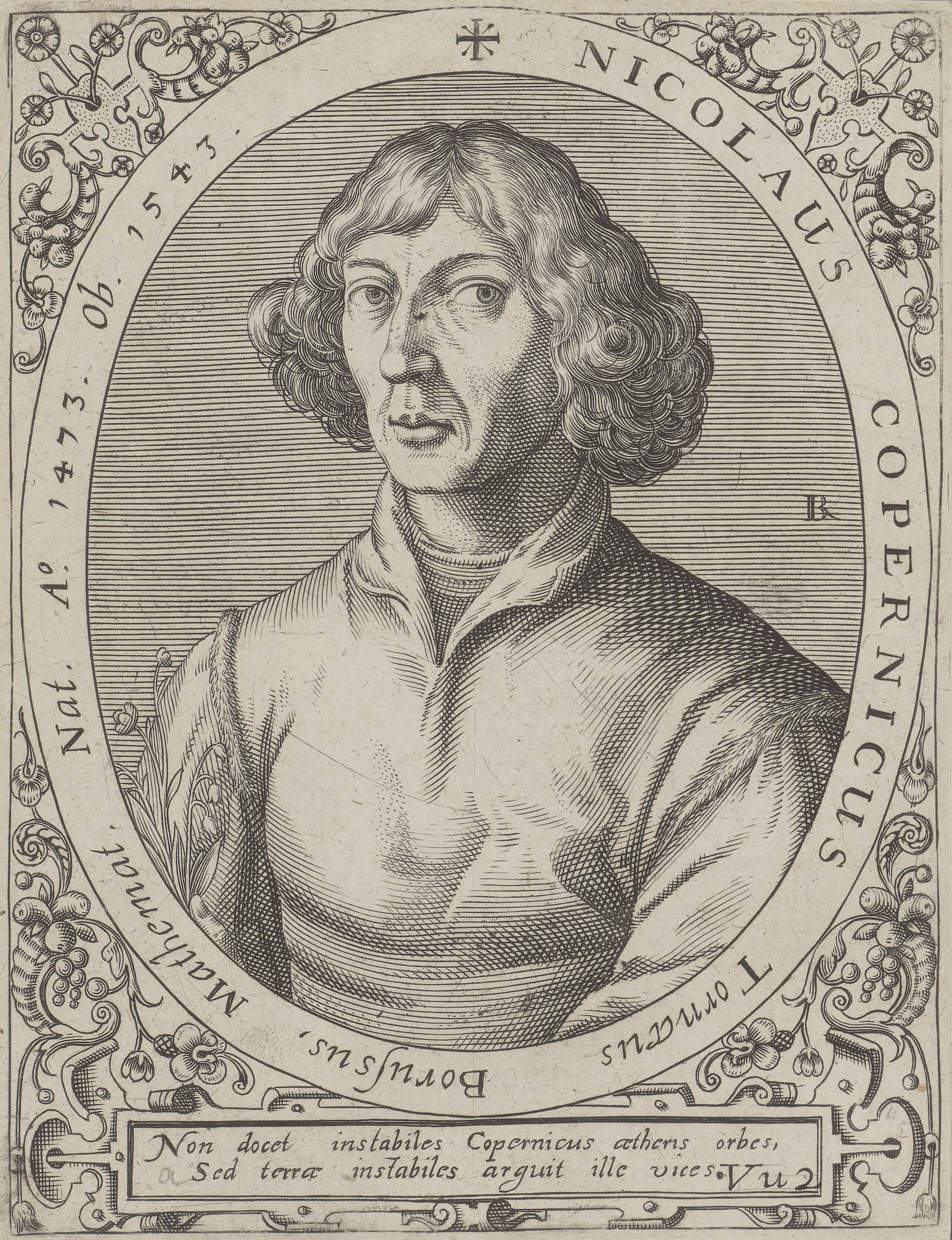
Nicolaus Copernicus

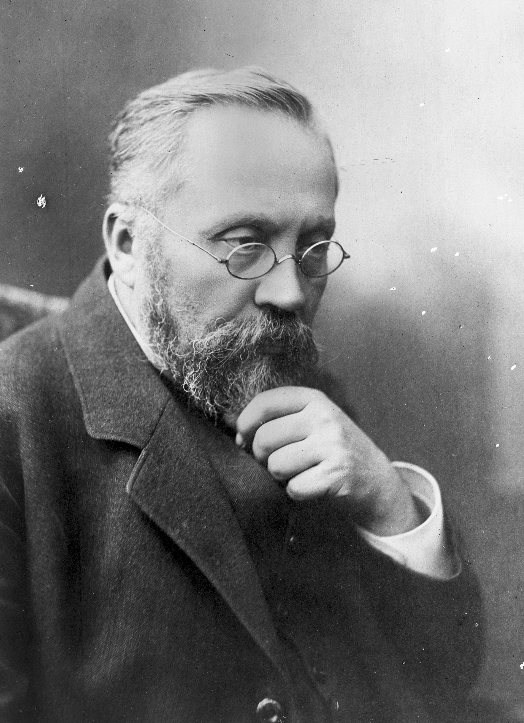
Napoleon Cybulski

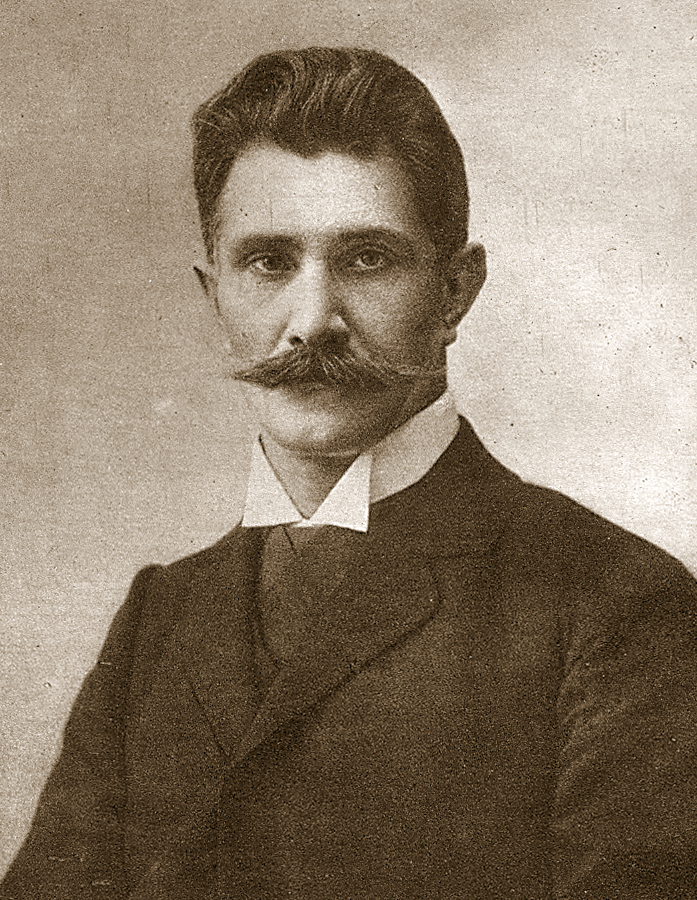
Ignacy Daszyński

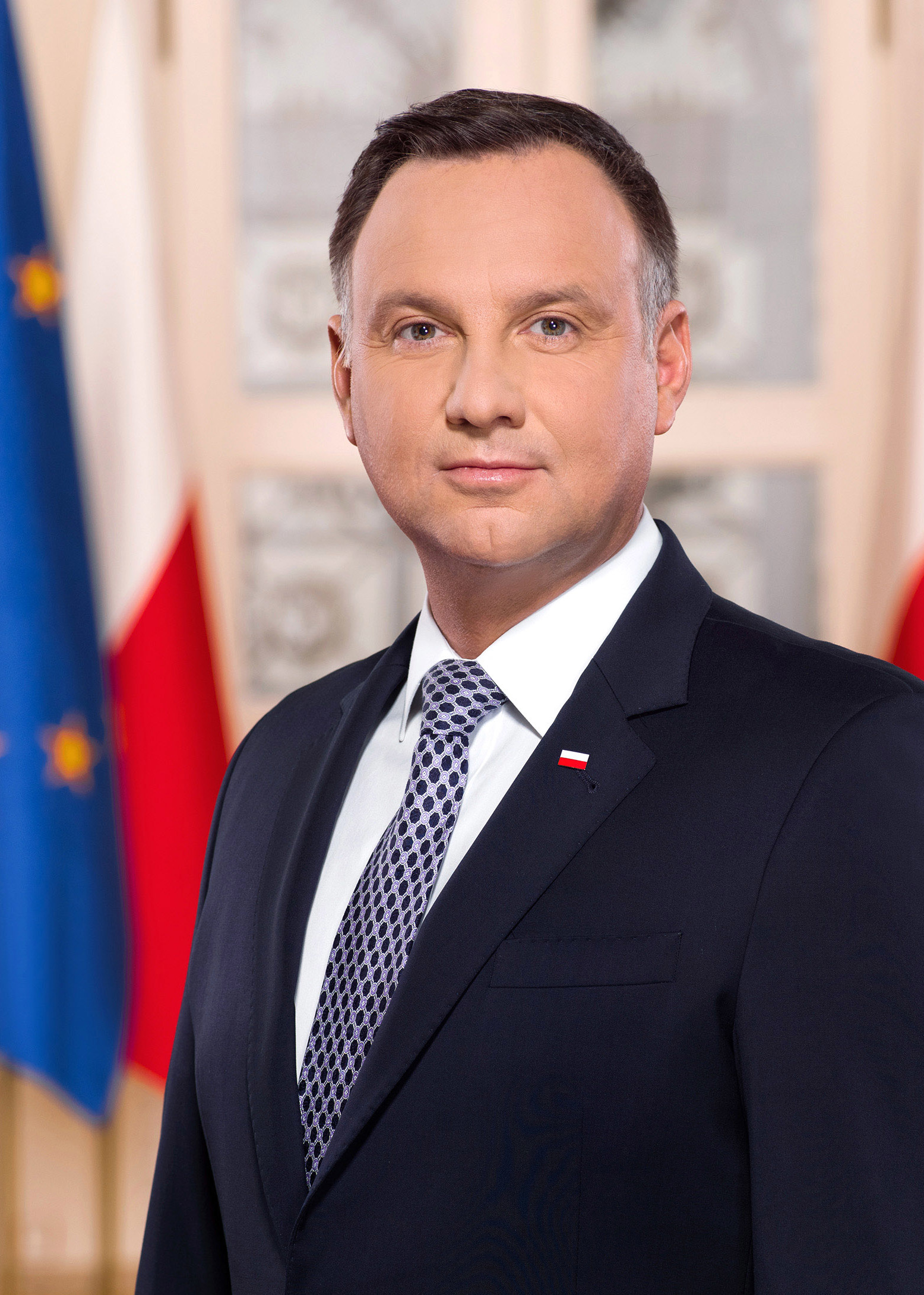
Andrzej Duda

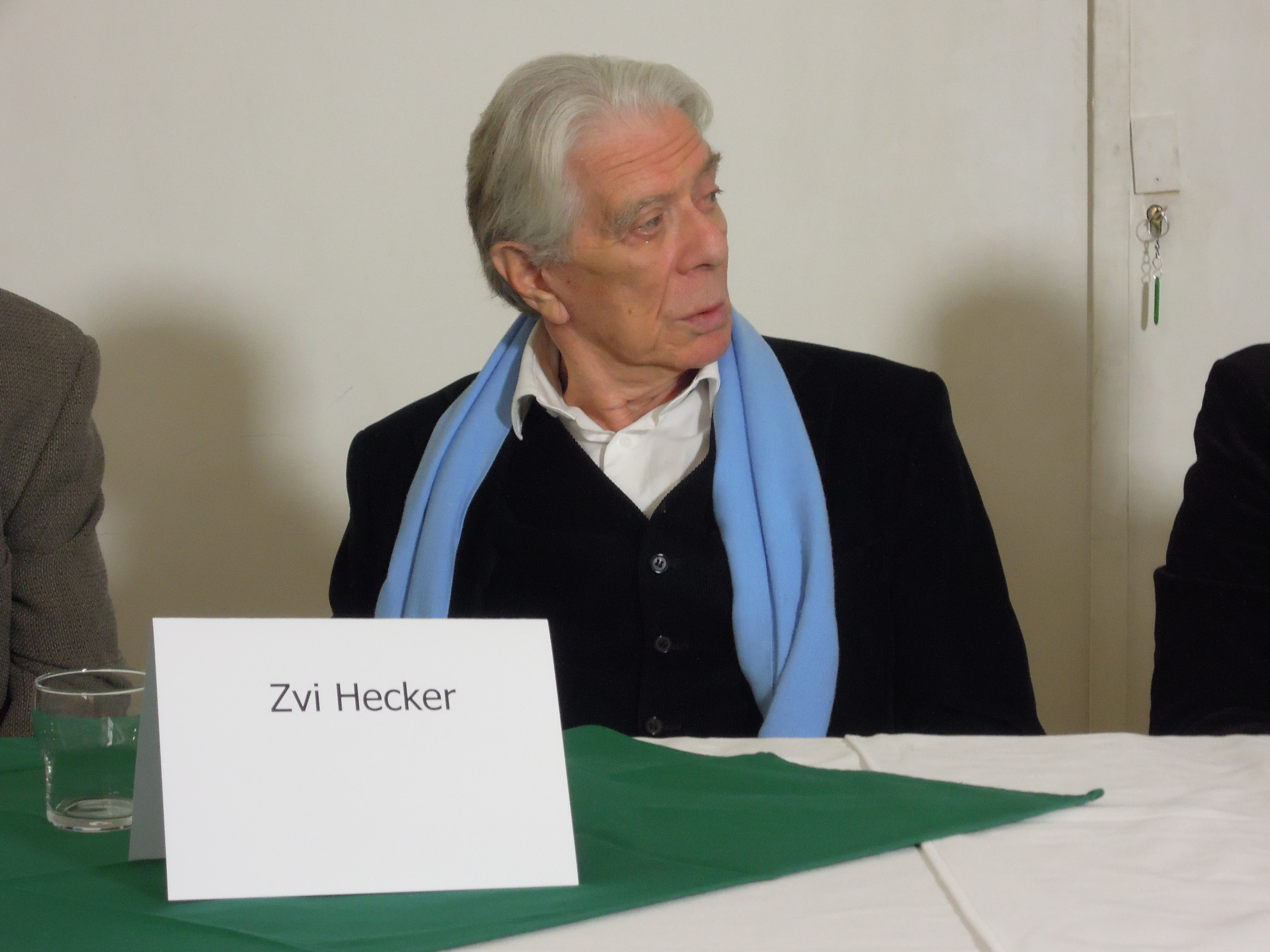
Zvi Hecker

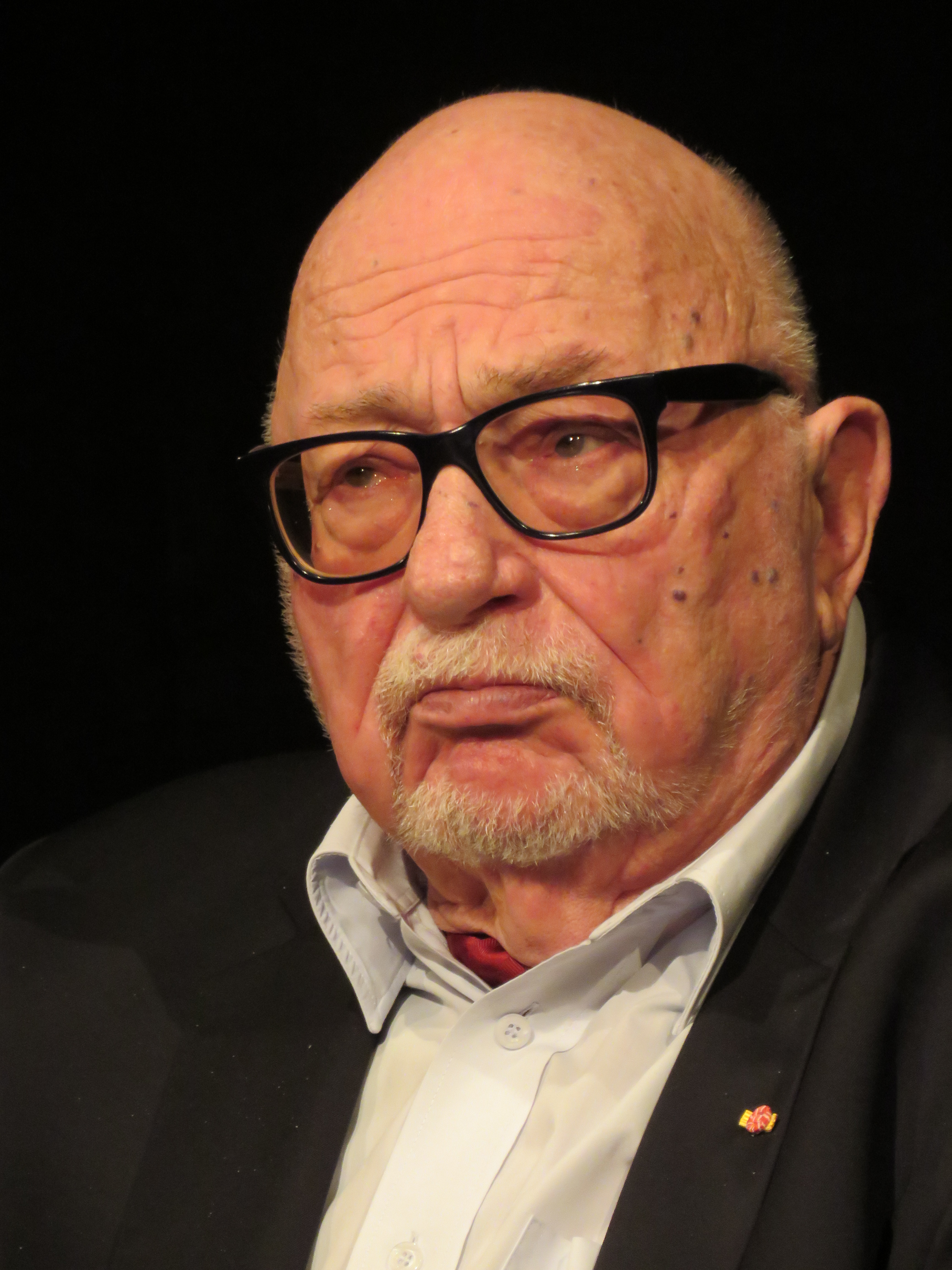
Jerzy Hoffman

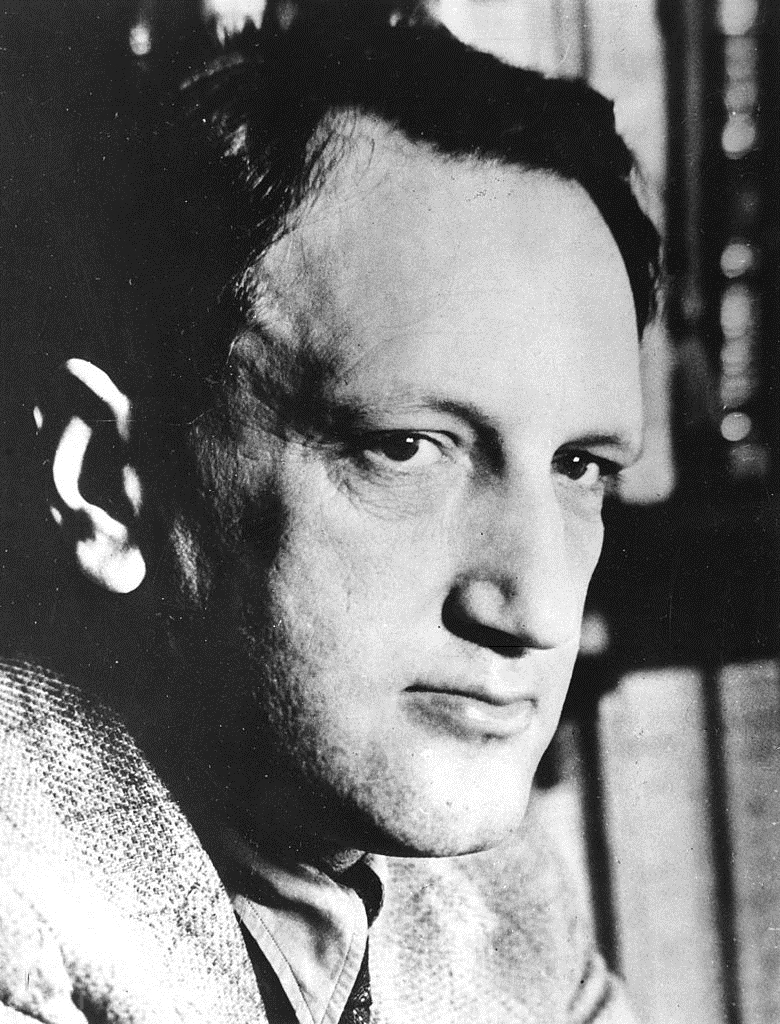
Leopold Infeld

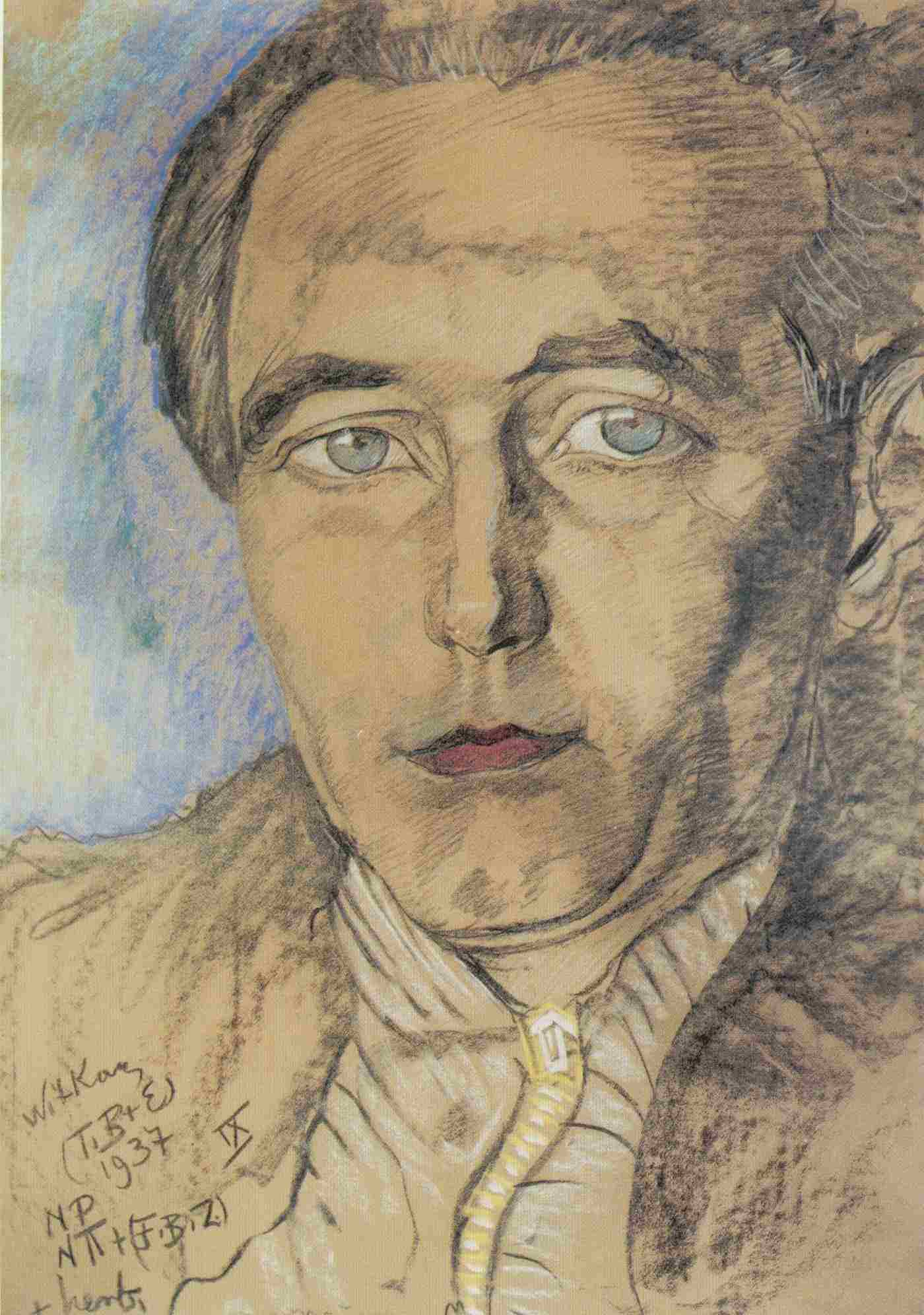
Roman Ingarden

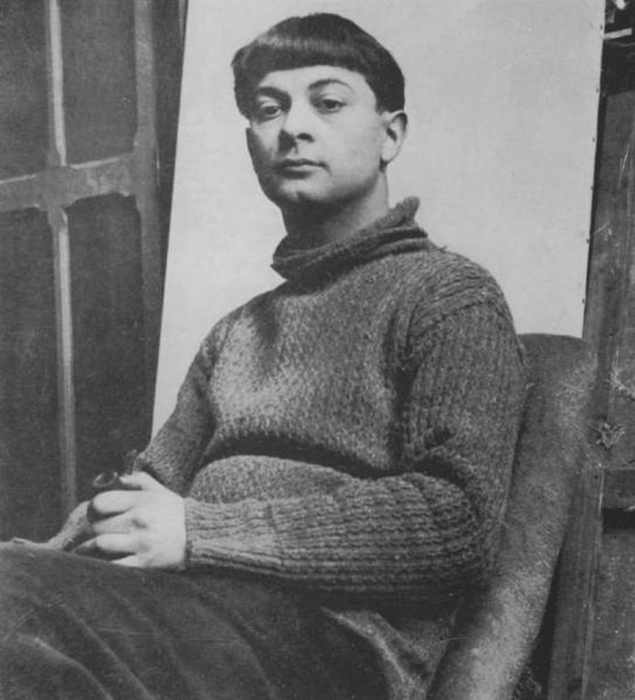
Moïse Kisling

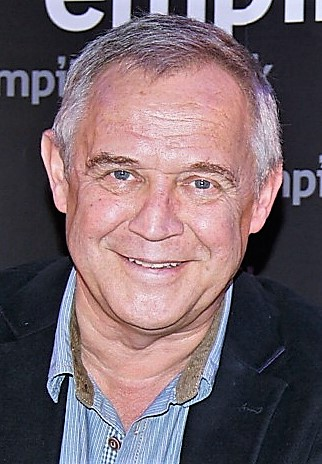
Marek Kondrat

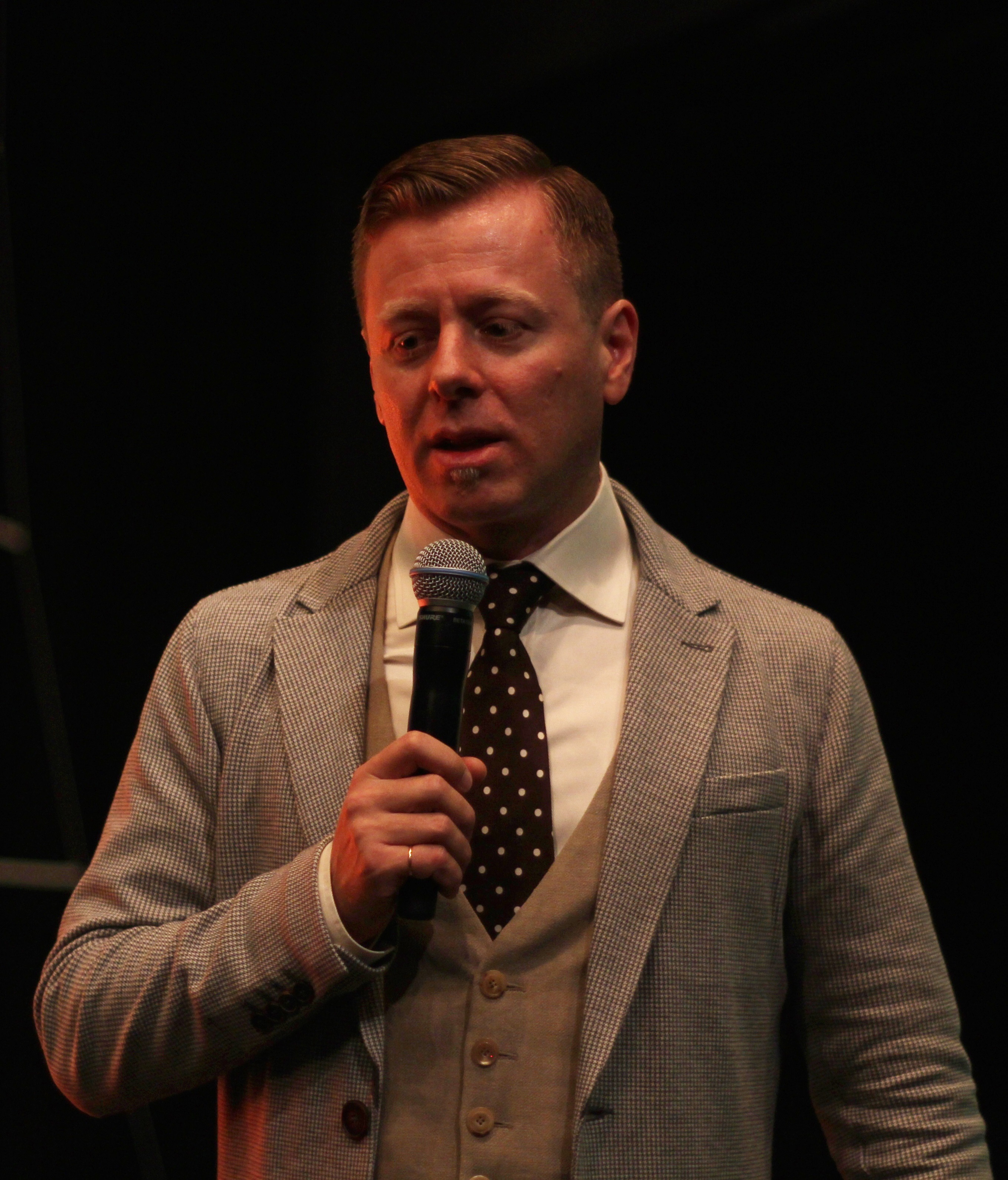
Abel Korzeniowski

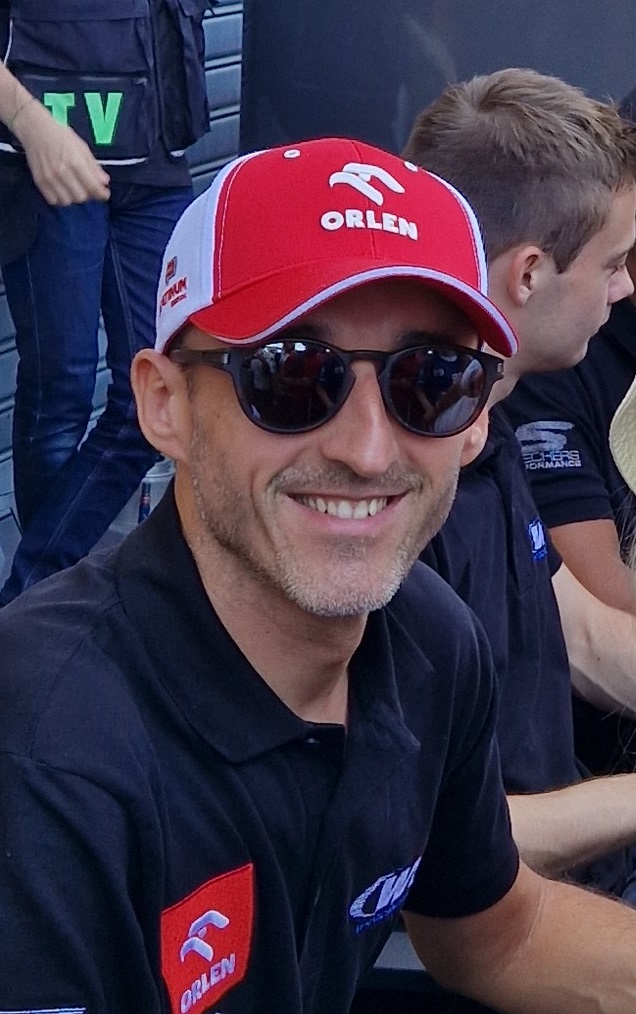
Robert Kubica

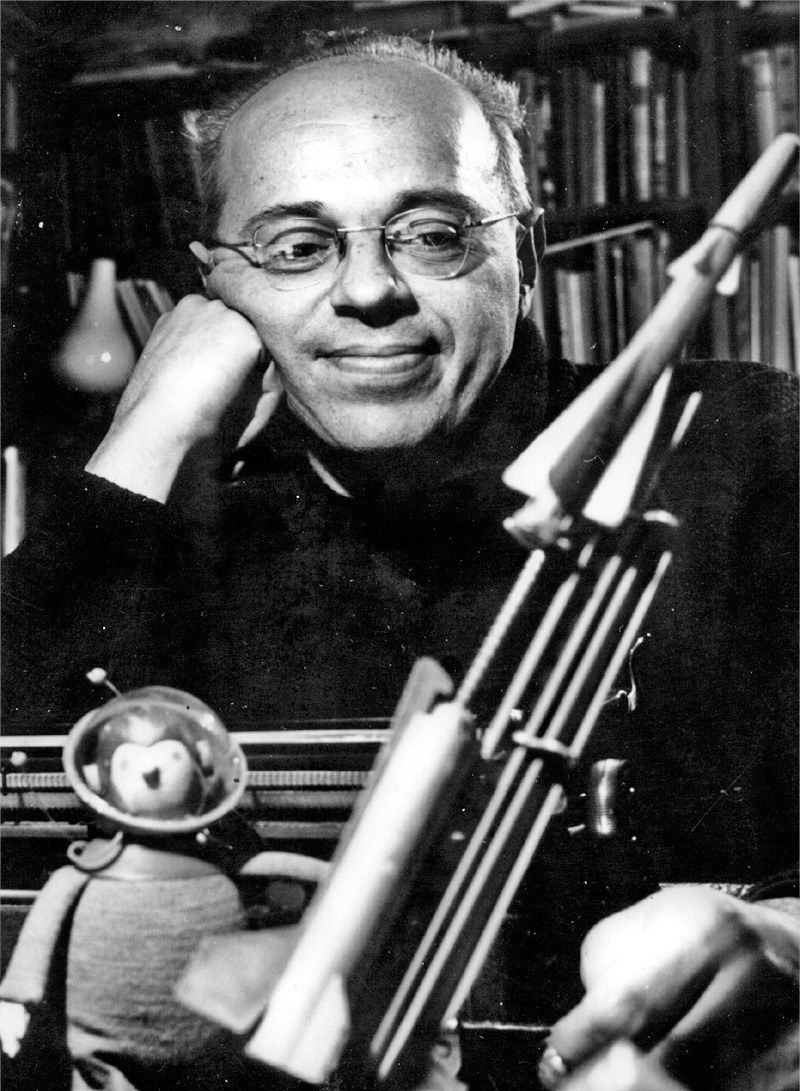
Stanisław Lem

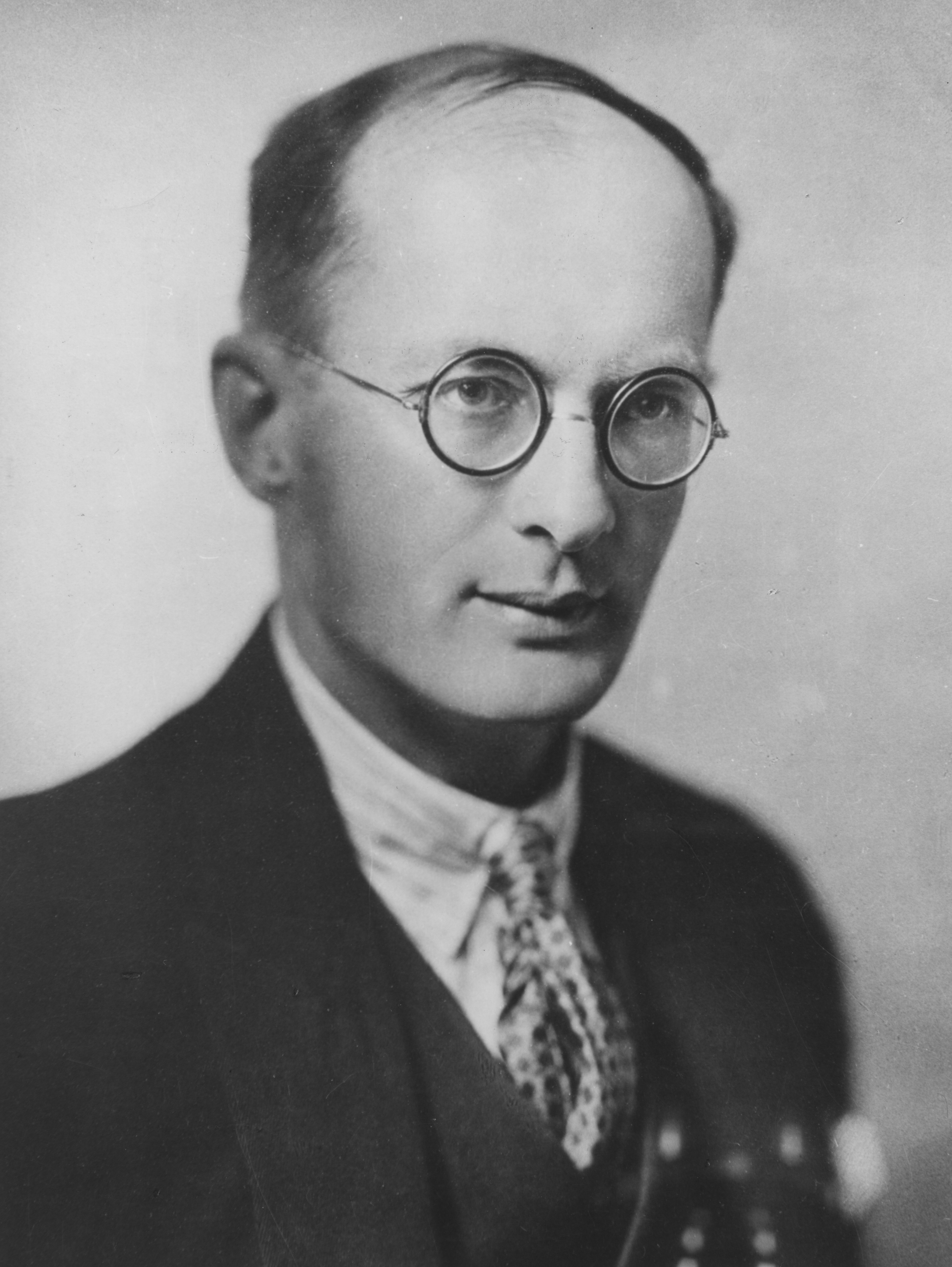
Bronisław Malinowski

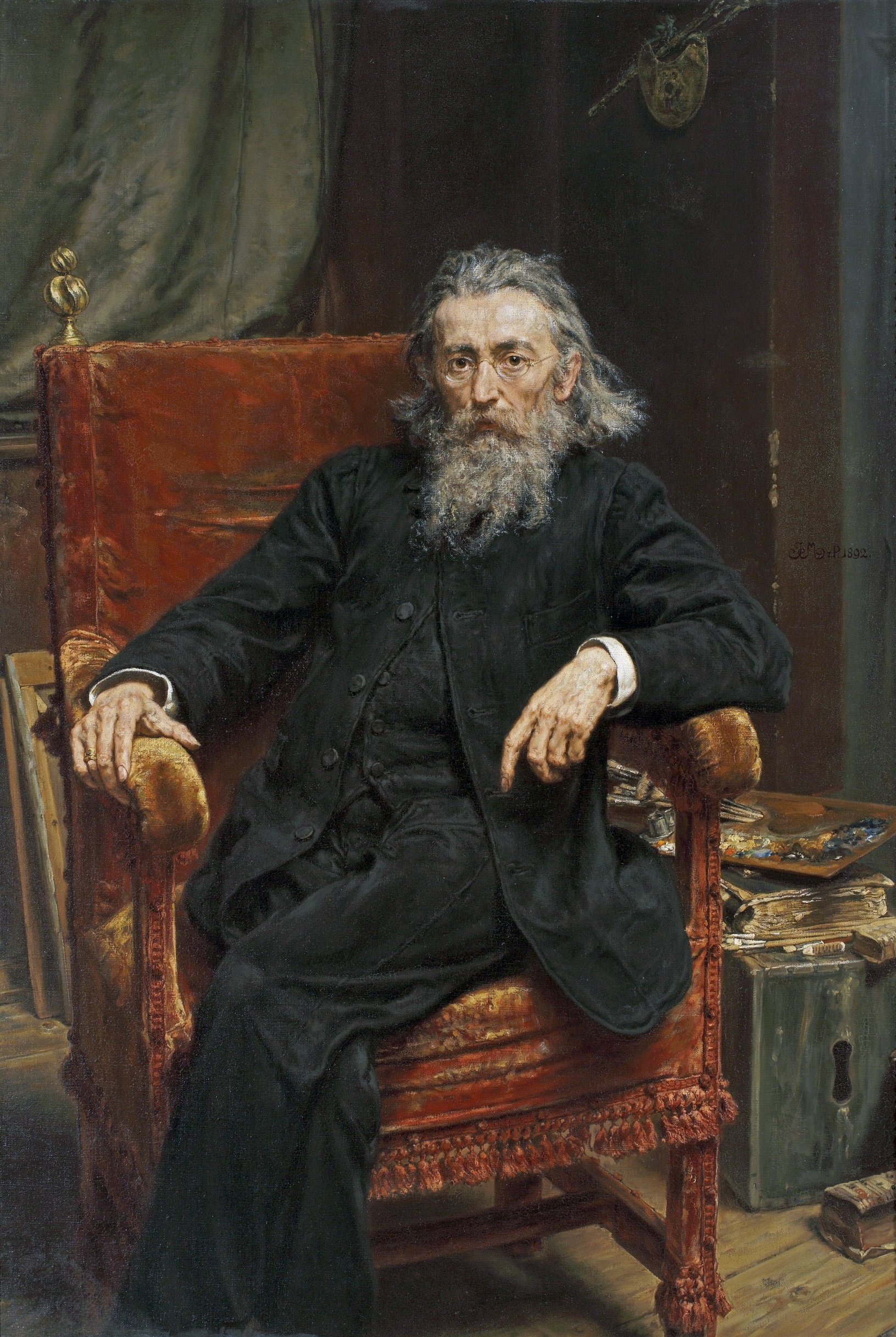
Jan Matejko

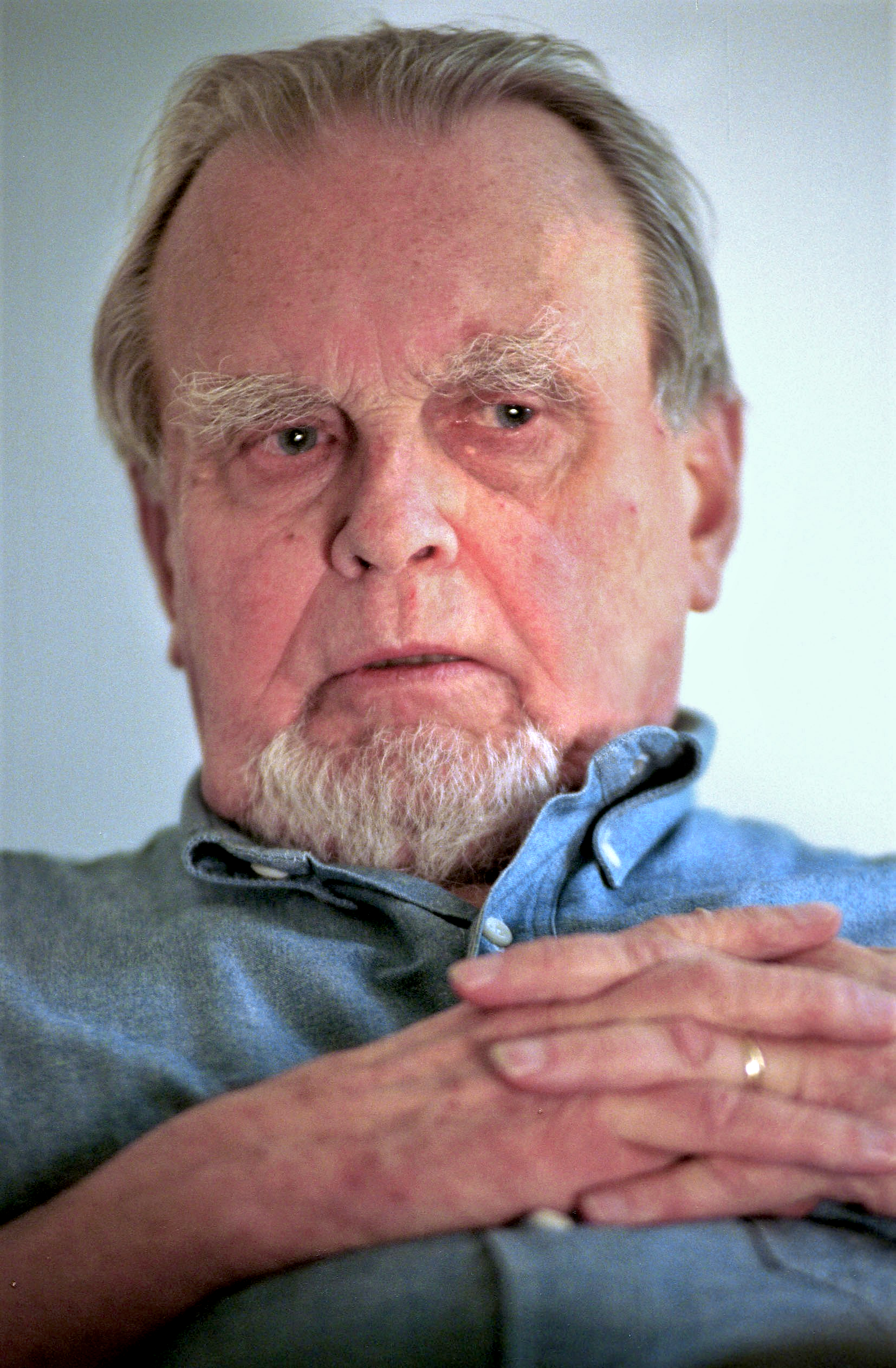
Czesław Miłosz

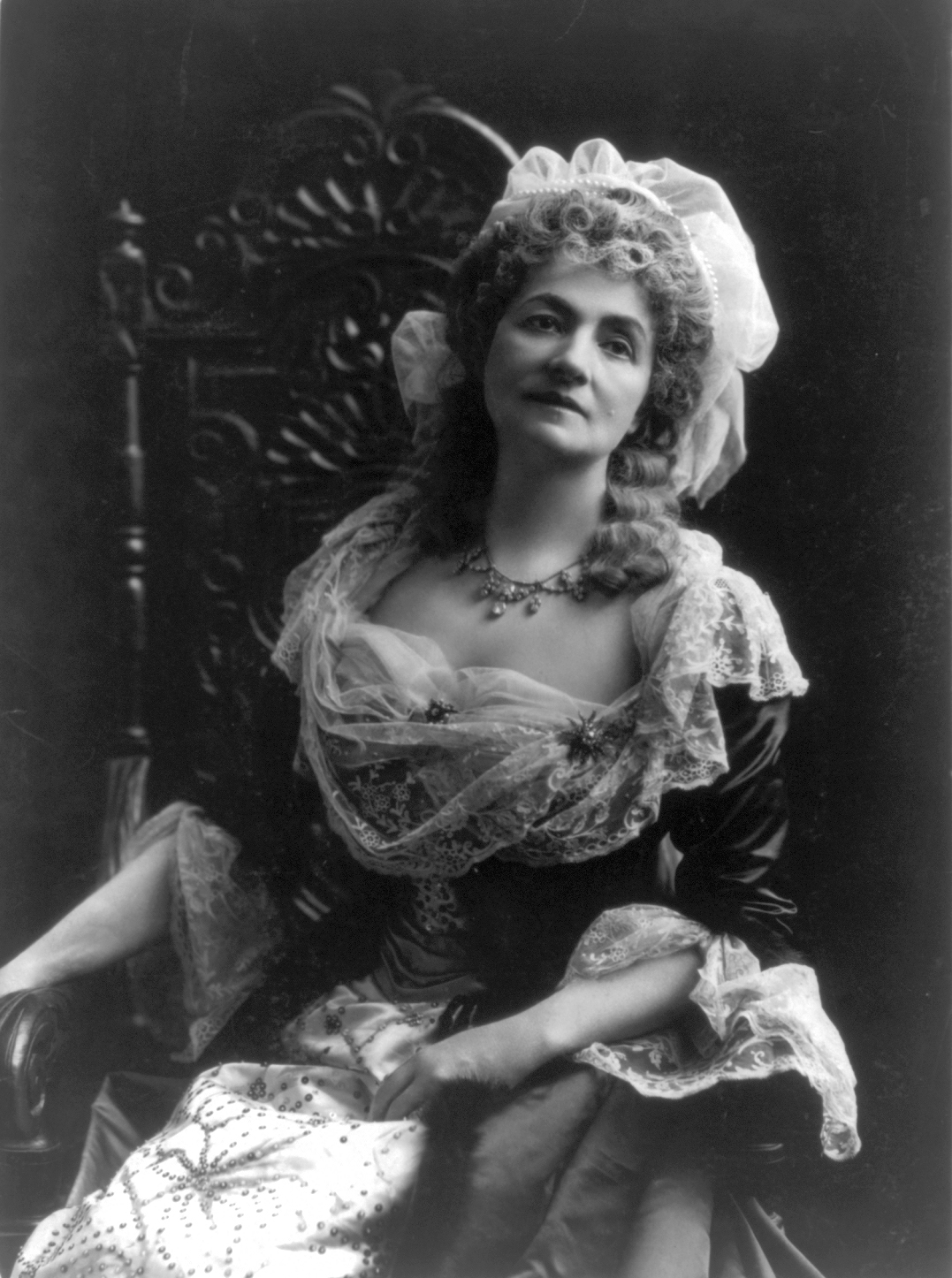
Helena Modjeska

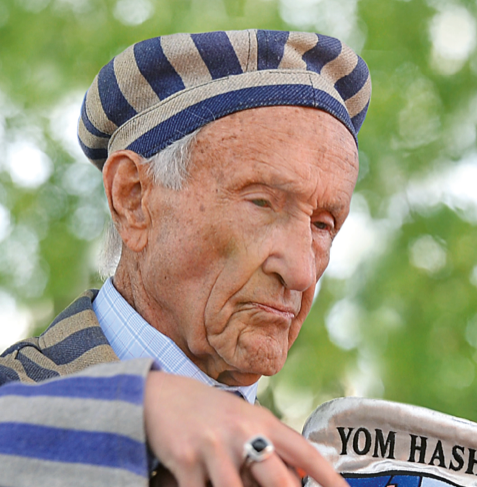
Edward Mosberg

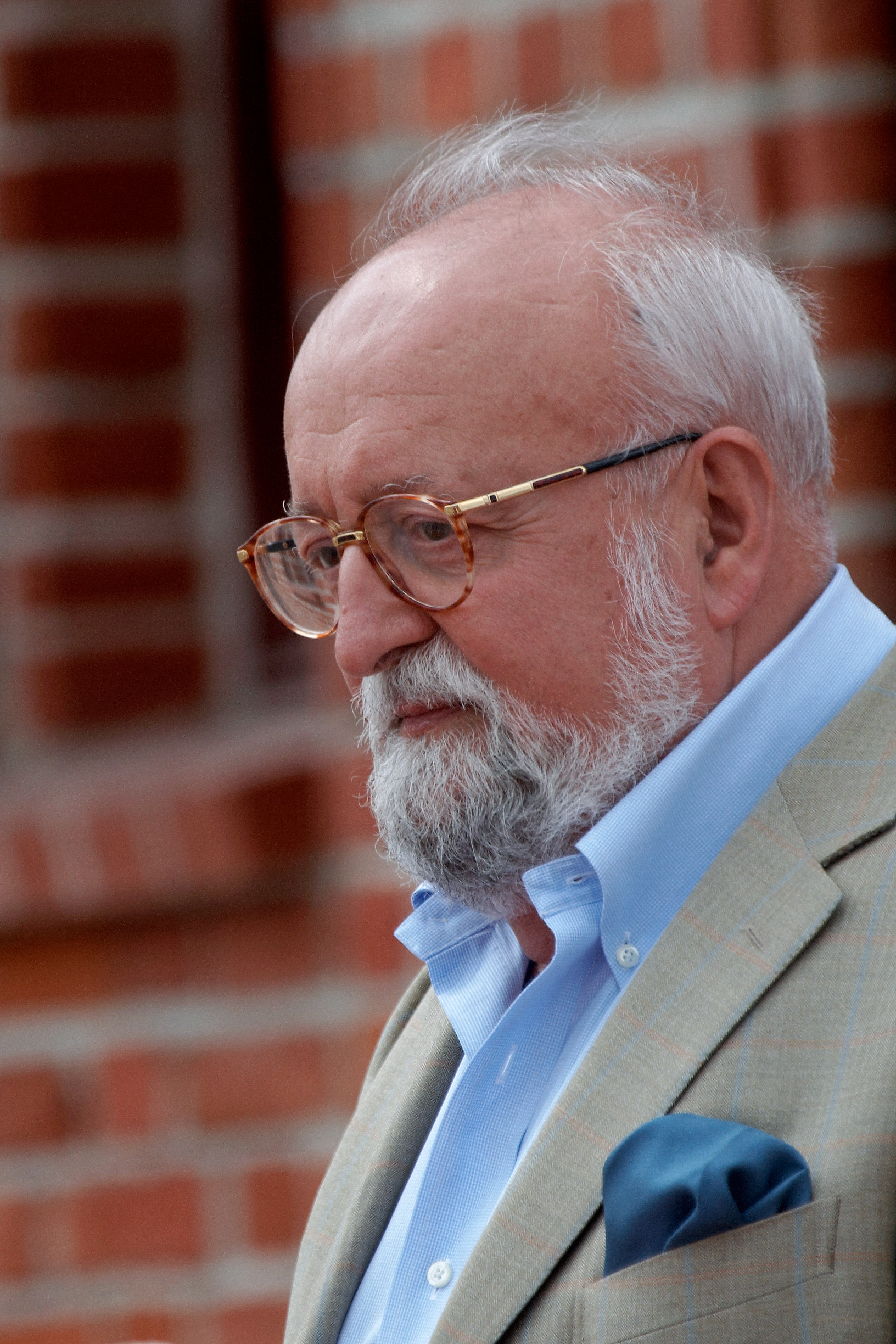
Krzysztof Penderecki

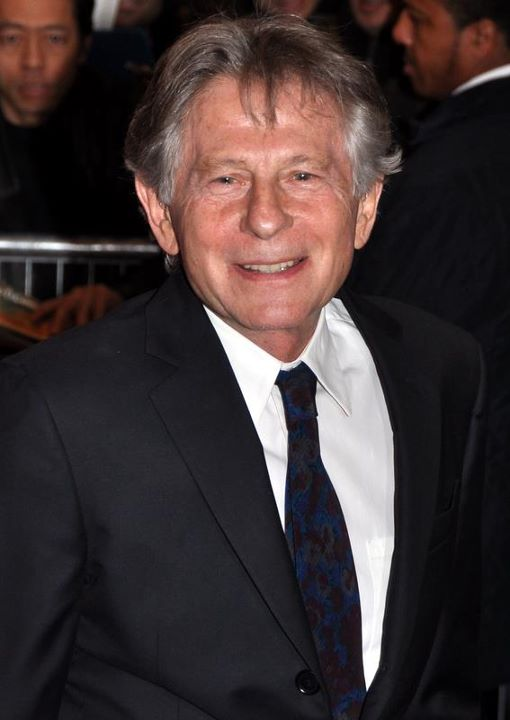
Roman Polanski

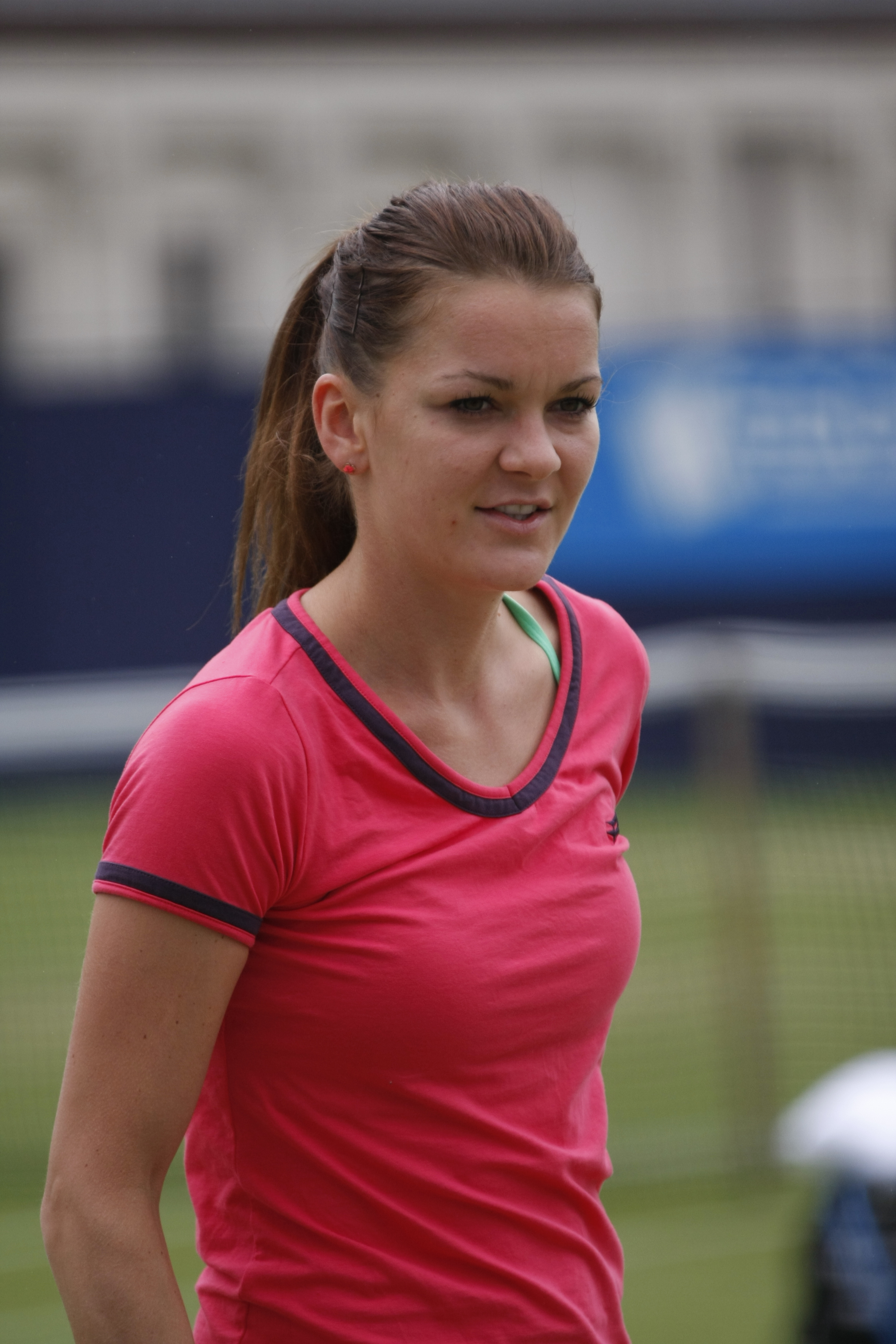
Agnieszka Radwańska

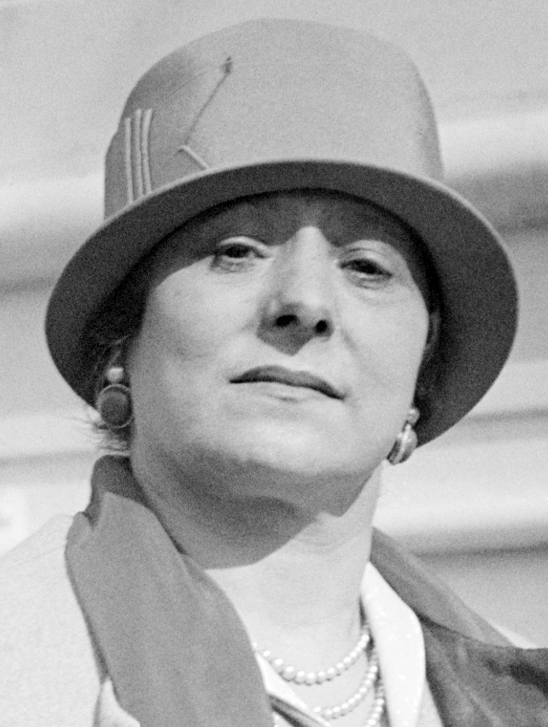
Helena Rubinstein

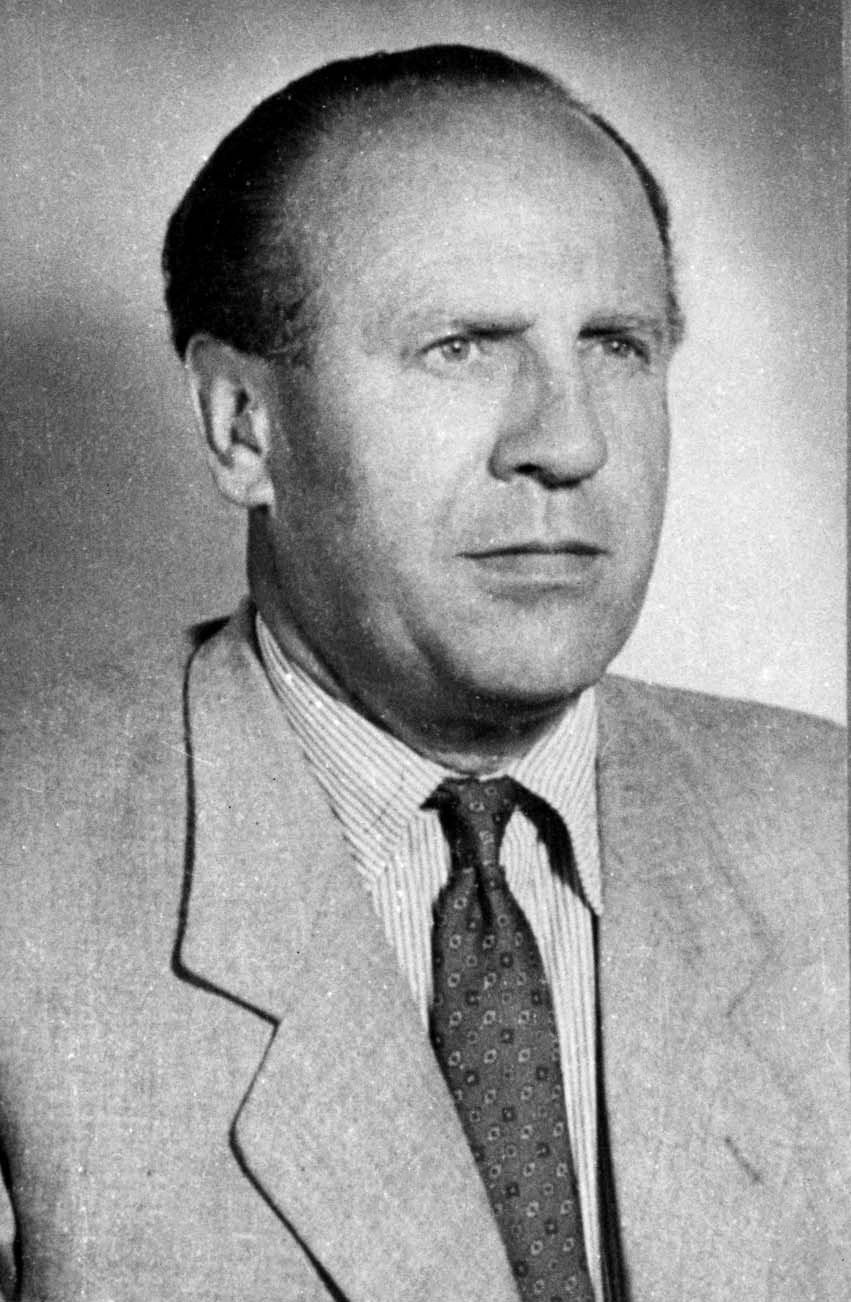
Oskar Schindler

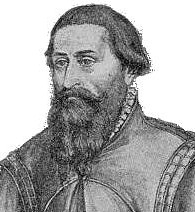
Veit Stoss

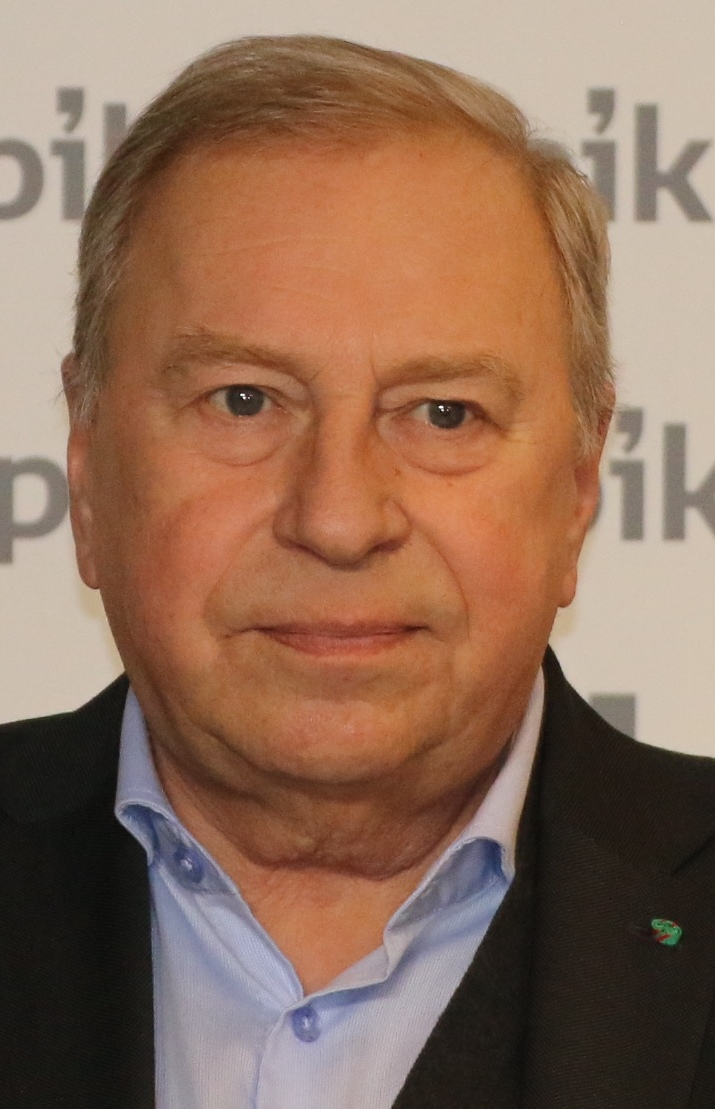
Jerzy Stuhr

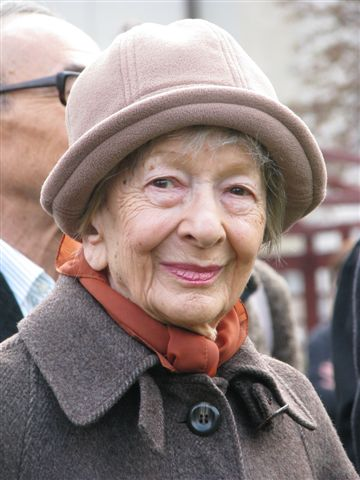
Wisława Szymborska

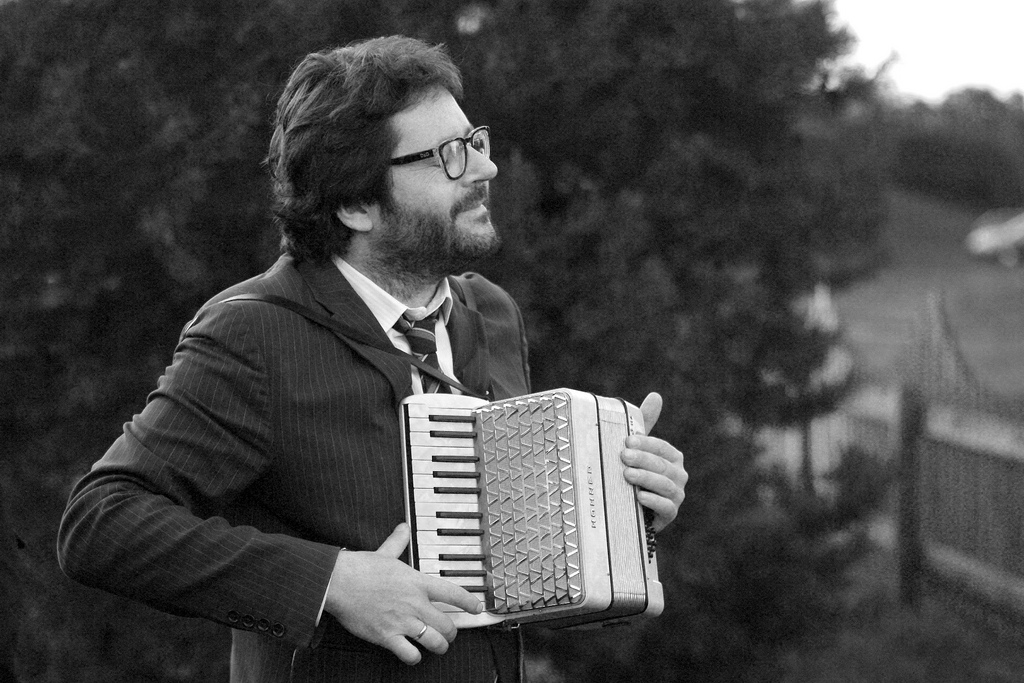
Grzegorz Turnau

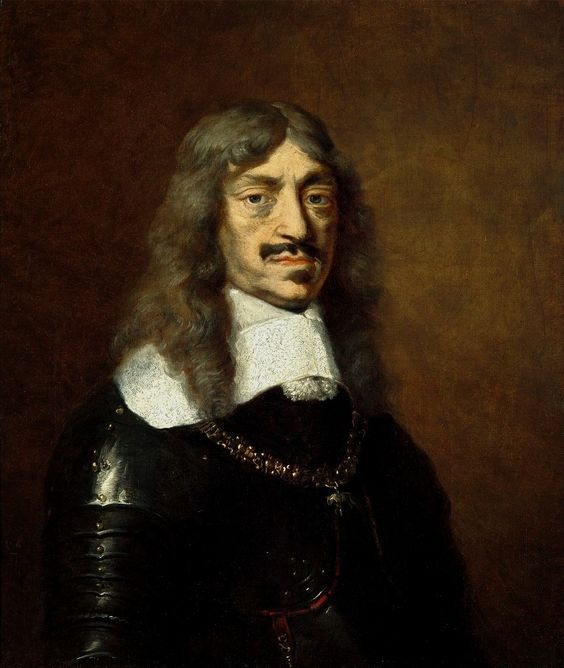
John II Casimir Vasa

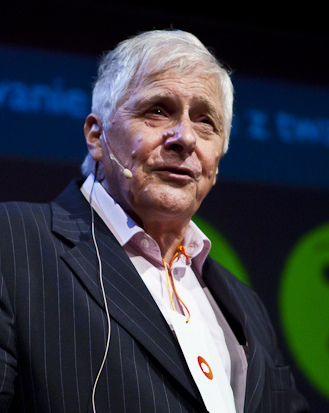
Jerzy Vetulani

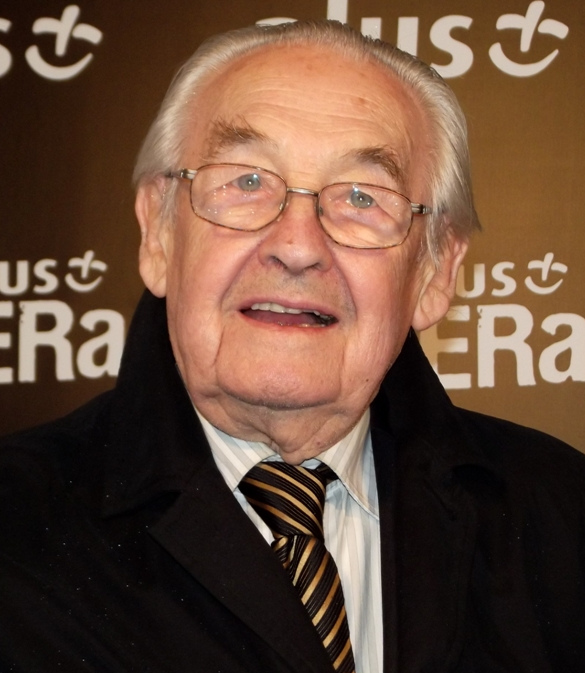
Andrzej Wajda

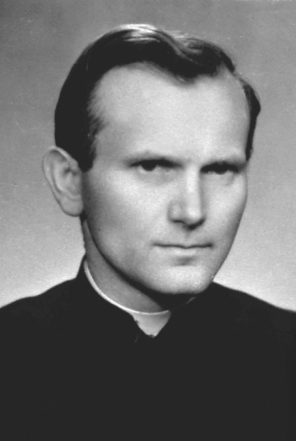
Karol Wojtyła, future Pope John Paul II

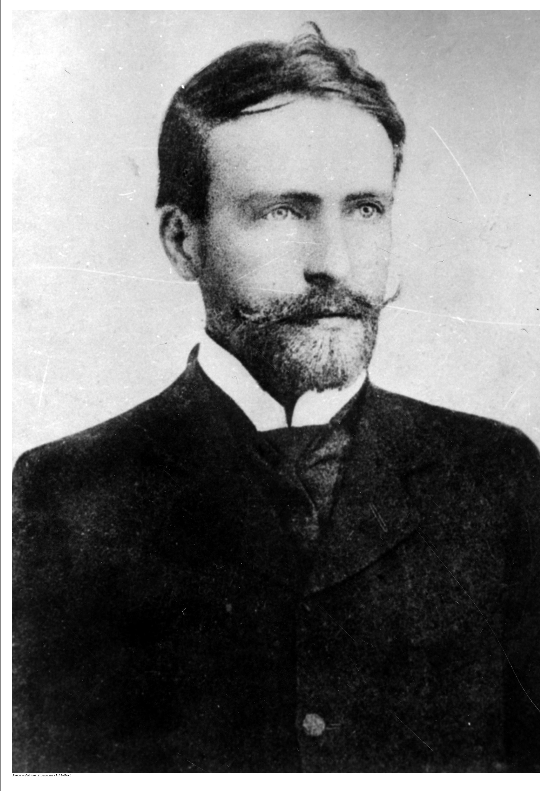
Stanisław Wyspiański

This list contains notable people both born in Kraków and residents of the city, ordered chronologically by year of birth.

== Born in Kraków ==
=== 11th to 18th centuries ===
- Ladislaus I of Hungary (ca.1040–1095) King of Hungary from 1077 and King of Croatia from 1091.
- Bolesław III Wrymouth (1086–1138), duke of Poland
- Władysław II the Exile (1105–1159), High Duke of Poland
- Matthew of Kraków (c. 1335–1410), theologian
- Władysław III of Poland (1424–1444), King of Poland.
- Casimir IV Jagiellon (1427–1492), King of Poland
- Vladislaus II of Hungary (1456–1516), King of Bohemia and Hungary
- Hedwig Jagiellon (1457–1502), Duchess of Bavaria
- John I Albert (1459–1501), King of Poland
- Sophia Jagiellon(1464–1512), Margravine of Brandenburg-Ansbach
- Johann V Thurzo (1466–1520), bishop
- Stanislav I Thurzo (1470–1540), bishop
- Stanislaus Hosius (1504–1579), Catholic cardinal.
- Sigismund II Augustus (1520–1572), King of Poland and Grand Duke of Lithuania
- Sophia Jagiellon (1522–1575), Duchess of Brunswick-Lüneburg
- Anna Jagiellon (1523–1596), Queen of Poland
- Hieronim Malecki (1525/1526–1583/1584), theologian
- Catherine Jagiellon (1526–1583), Queen of Sweden
- Rabbi Moses Isserles (1530–1572) an eminent Polish Ashkenazic rabbi.
- Mikołaj Zebrzydowski (1553–1620), noble
- Maharsha (1555–1631), rabbi
- Władysław IV Vasa (1595–1648), King of Poland
- John II Casimir Vasa (1609–1672), King of Poland
- Elazar Rokeach (c. 1665–1742), rabbi
- Theresa Kunegunda Sobieska (1676–1730), Electress of Bavaria and of the Electorate of the Palatinate
- Szymon Czechowicz (1689–1775), painter
- Jonathan Eybeschutz (1690–1764), Talmudist and Kabbalist
- Aleksander Józef Sułkowski (1695–1762), Saxon-Polish general
- Józef Peszka (1767–1831), painter and art professor
- Andrzej Alojzy Ankwicz (1777–1838), archbishop of Lviv and of Prague
- Carl Carl (1787–1854), actor and theatre director
- Henryk Dembiński (1791–1864), engineer, traveler and general
- Franciszek Mirecki (1791–1862), composer, music conductor, and music teacher
- Marcin Zaleski (1796–1877), painter
- Eduard von Feuchtersleben (1798–1857), mining engineer and writer
- Piotr Michałowski (1800–1855), painter
- Wojciech Stattler (1800–1875), painter and art teacher

=== 19th century ===
==== 1801 to 1850 ====
- Karl von Urban (1802–1877), field marshal in the Austrian Imperial Army
- Friedrich Halm (1806–1871), poet, dramatist, and novella writer.
- Józef Kremer (1806–1875), philosopher, aesthetician, historian of art and psychologist
- Ludwik Gorzkowski (1811–1857), politician, physicist and revolutionary activist
- Antoni Kątski (1817–1899), pianist and composer
- Maximilian Cercha (1818–1907), painter and drawer
- Julian Gutowski (1823–1890), Mayor of Nowy Sącz
- Ludwig Burger (1825–1884), historical painter and illustrator
- Karol Estreicher (senior) (1827–1908), bibliographer, librarian, and a founder of the Polish Academy of Learning
- Stanisław Mieroszewski (1827–1900), politician, writer, historian and member of the Imperial Council of Austria
- Władysław Łuszczkiewicz (1828–1900), painter and art historian
- Aleksander Kotsis (1836–1877), painter
- Michał Bałucki (1837–1901), playwright and poet
- Jan Matejko (1838–1893), painter
- Adam Bełcikowski (1839–1909) philosopher, historian of literature, poet
- Helena Modjeska (1840–1909), actress.
- Anton Rehmann (1840–1917), geographer, geomorphologist, botanist and explorer

==== 1851 to 1900 ====
- Edmund von Neusser (1852–1912), internist and professor
- Josef Josephi (1852–1920), singer and actor
- Stanisław Tondos (1854–1917), painter
- Eduard Birnbaum (1855–1920), cantor
- Kazimierz Pochwalski (1855–1940), painter
- Jan Drozdowski (1857–1918), pianist and music teacher
- Arthur Giesl von Gieslingen (1857–1935), general officer during the First World War who worked for the Evidenzbureau
- Heinrich Rauchinger (1858–1942), portrait painter and history painter
- Ignaz Sowinski (1858–1917), architect
- Lola Beeth (1861–1940), Austrian operatic soprano
- Adam Maurizio (1862–1941), botanist and specialist of food technology and cultural history
- Olga Boznańska (1865–1940), painter
- Leon Wachholz (1867–1942), scientist and medical examiner
- Sigmund Fraenkel (1868–1939), chemist
- Asriel Günzig (1868–1931), rabbi
- Stanisław Estreicher (1869–1939), historian of Law and politician
- Stanisław Wyspiański (1869–1907), playwright, painter, and poet
- Saul Raphael Landau (1870–1943), lawyer and Jewish publicist
- Heinrich Nebenzahl (1870–1938), film producer
- Henryk Opieński (1870–1942), composer
- Helena Rubinstein (1870–1965), cosmetics entrepreneur and philanthropist
- Lucjan Rydel (1870–1918), poet and playwright
- Michał Marian Siedlecki (1873–1940), marine biologist
- Rudolf Maria Holzapfel (1874–1930), psychologist and philosopher
- Rafael Schermann (1874–1943), graphologist and psychic
- Xawery Dunikowski (1875–1964), sculptor and artist
- Władysław Wróblewski (1875–1951), politician, scientist, diplomat, and lawyer
- Bernard Friedberg (1876–1961), Hebraist, scholar and bibliographer
- Mordechaj Gebirtig (1877–1942), poet and composer
- Archduchess Maria Christina of Austria (1879–1962), Archduchess of Austria
- Adolf Chybiński (1880–1952), historian, musicologist, and academic
- Henryk Grossman (1881–1950), economist, historian, and Marxist revolutionary
- Gustav Adolf Platz (1881–1947), architect
- Max Fleischer (1883–1972), cartoonist and film producer
- Leon Chwistek (1884–1944), painter, theoretician of modern art, literary critic, logician, philosopher, and mathematician
- Bronisław Malinowski (1884–1942), social anthropologist
- Tadeusz Kutrzeba (1885–1947), general in the Polish Army
- Juliusz Osterwa (1885–1947), actor, theatre director, and art theoretician
- Stefan Bryła (1886–1943), construction engineer and welding pioneer
- Zygmunt Klemensiewicz (1886–1963), physicist, physical chemist, and mountain climber
- Leon Schiller (1887–1954), theatre director and theatre theoretician
- Eugeniusz Kwiatkowski (1888–1974), economist, politician
- Stanislaus Poray (1888–1948), painter active in Hollywood, California
- Józef Retinger (1888–1960), scholar, international political activist, publicist, and writer
- Henryk Gotlib (1890–1966), painter, sculptor, and writer.dnb
- Josef von Manowarda (1890–1942), operatic singer
- Moise Kisling (1891–1953), painter
- Tadeusz Peiper (1891–1969), poet, art critic, and theoretician of literature
- Zofia Stryjeńska (1891–1976), painter, graphic designer, illustrator, stage designer
- Stefan Banach (1892–1945), mathematician
- Roman Ingarden (1893–1970), philosopher
- Frank Linke-Crawford (1893–1918), flying ace of the Austro-Hungarian Air Force during World War I.
- Ewa Bandrowska-Turska (1894–1979), opera singer and music educator
- Alice Halicka (1894–1975), painter
- Emil August Fieldorf (1895–1953), deputy commander-in-chief of the Polish Home Army
- Joseph Rosenstock (1895–1985), conductor and composer
- Elsa Gasser (1896–1967), Polish-born Swiss economist and businesswoman
- Ferdynand Zweig (1896–1988), economist and sociologist
- Michał Antoniewicz (1897–1989), equestrian
- Jerzy Adam Brandhuber (1897–1981), painter and survivor of the Auschwitz concentration camp
- Henryk Reyman (1897–1963), football player and football trainer
- Leopold Infeld (1898–1968), physicist
- Rudolph Maté (1898–1964), cinematographer and film director
- Ludwik Gintel (1899–1973), footballer
- Leon Kruczkowski (1900–1962), writer
- Leon Sperling (1900–1941), football player
- Cristina Szalay de Wiedemann (1900–1991), Polish–Colombian painter and conservator

=== 20th century ===
==== 1901 to 1925 ====
- Yohanan Bader (1901–1994), Israeli politician
- Gilda Gray (1901–1959), actress and dancer.bnf
- Itzhak Stern (1901–1969), Holocaust survivor
- Alexander Weissberg-Cybulski (1901–1964), physicist, author, and businessman
- Alexander Abusch (1902–1982), journalist, writer, and politician in East Germany
- Paul Rosenstein-Rodan (1902–1985), economist
- Adam Doboszyński (1904–1949), writer, soldier, social activist
- Ludwik Gross (1904–1999), oncologist and virologist
- Wanda Wasilewska (1905–1964), politician and writer
- Karol Estreicher (junior) (1906–1984), professor and historian of art
- Jan Hoffman (1906–1995), pianist and music educator
- Edward Ochab (1906–1989), politician and general
- Adam Marczyński (1908–1985), painter
- Tadek Marek (1908–1982), automobile engineer
- Janina Oszast (1908–1986), biologist and resistance movement member
- Yoel Zussman (1910–1982), jurist and judge
- Wacław Gajewski (1911–1997), geneticist
- Jadwiga Jędrzejowska (1912–1980), tennis player
- Jerzy Turowicz (1912–1999), journalist and editor
- Jan Ekier (1913–2004), pianist, composer, and music educator
- Poldek Pfefferberg (1913–2001), Holocaust survivor
- Yitzhak Pundak (born Yitzhak Fundik; 1913–2017), Israeli general, diplomat, and politician
- Tadeusz Hołuj (1916–1985), writer and survivor of Auschwitz
- Haim Landau (1916–1981), Israeli independence fighter and Israeli Minister of Development and Minister of Transportation
- Wojciech Żukrowski (1916–2000), writer, poet, essayist, and literary critic
- Aleksander Kulisiewicz (1918–1982), journalist and singer
- Roman Haubenstock-Ramati (1919–1994), music editor and composer
- Mietek Pemper (1920–2011), survivor of Krakow-Płaszów concentration camp
- Andrzej Munk (1921–1961), director and cinematographer
- Wiktor Jassem (1922–2016), linguist, phonetician, philologist
- Halina Czerny-Stefańska (1922–2001), classical pianist
- Bogdan Śliwa (1922–2003), chess player
- Gustaw Holoubek (1923–2008), actor, film and theatre director and educator
- Jerzy Nowosielski (1923–2011), painter, graphic artist, and illustrator
- Zofia Posmysz (1923–2022), editor and author
- Gena Turgel (1923–2018), educator, author, and Holocaust survivor
- Piotr Wandycz (1923–2017), Polish-American historian
- Wojciech Has (1925–2000), film director

==== 1926 to 1950 ====
- Edward Mosberg (1926–2022), Polish-American Holocaust survivor, educator, and philanthropist
- Miriam Akavia (1927–2015), writer and translator
- Moshe Taube (1927–2020), cantor, academic, and musician
- Franciszek Macharski (1927–2016), Archbishop of Krakow
- Bernard Offen (born 1929), Holocaust survivor and film producer
- Zvi Hecker (1931–2023), architect
- Jerzy Hoffman (born 1932), film director
- Andrzej Trzaskowski (1933–1998), jazz composer and musicologist
- Danuta Rinn (1936–2006), singer and actress
- Jerzy Vetulani (1936–2017), biochemist, psychopharmacologist and neuroscientist
- Adam Greenberg (1937–2025), cinematographer
- Adam Holender (born 1937), cinematographer
- Zygmunt Konieczny (born 1937), composer
- Andrzej Sariusz-Skąpski (1937–2010), President of the Federation of Katyn Families
- Marek Walczewski (1937–2009), actor
- Roma Ligocka (born 1938), costume designer, author, and painter
- Anna Polony (born 1939), theatre and film actress
- Barbara Buczek (1940–1993), composer, pianist, and music educator
- Kazimierz Kaczor (born 1941), actor
- Ewa Demarczyk (1941–2020), singer
- Janusz Muniak (1941–2016), jazz musician
- Ivan Putski (born 1941), professional wrestler and bodybuilder
- Stefan Jerzy Zweig (1941–2024), author and cinematographer
- Marek Koterski (born 1942), film director
- Janina Paradowska (1942–2016), journalist
- Zbigniew Stroniarz (1942–2017), footballer
- Bronisław Cieślak (1943–2021), actor, journalist, TV presenter, politician
- Krzysztof Meyer (born 1943), composer, pianist, music theorist, and professor
- Simona Kossak (1943–2007), biologist, ecologist
- Jerzy Bahr (1944–2016), Ambassador of the Republic of Poland to the Russian Federation
- Ewa Braun (born 1944), Oscar winning set decorator, costume designer, and production designer
- Antoni Wit (born 1944), conductor
- Ewa Lipska (born 1945), writer
- Leszek Żądło (born 1945), jazz musician and university teacher
- Jerzy Zelnik (born 1945), actor
- Robert Gadocha (born 1946), soccer player
- Zbigniew Seifert (1946–1979), jazz musician
- Elżbieta Penderecka (1947–2025), cultural activist, patron of culture
- Andrzej Olechowski (born 1947), politician and economist
- Jerzy Stuhr (1947–2024), actor and director
- Jan Balachowski (born 1948), sprinter
- Hanna Dodiuk-Kenig (born 1948), chemist
- Jan Widacki (born 1948), jurisprudence academic, professor, diplomat, and politician
- Andrzej Zaucha (1949–1991), singer
- Ryszard Legutko (born 1949), politician
- Zbigniew Wassermann (1949–2010), politician and jurist
- Marek Kondrat (born 1950), actor
- Johann Rafelski (born 1950), physicist

==== 1951 to 1975 ====
- Jan Gmyrek (born 1951), handball player
- Olga Jackowska (1951–2018), singer
- Tadeusz Rutkowski (born 1951), weightlifter
- Jerzy Miller (born 1952), Polish Minister of the Interior
- Ryszard Szeremeta (born 1952), composer, conductor, and jazz singer
- Jarek Śmietana (1953–2013), jazz musician
- Dobrosława Miodowicz-Wolf (1953—1986), alpinist, mountaineer, ethnographer
- Bogusław Sonik (born 1953), politician
- Róża Thun (born 1954), publicist and Member of the European Parliament
- Zdzisław Kapka (born 1954), football player, football manager, and politician
- Paul Dembinski (born 1955), economist
- Grzegorz Miecugow (1955–2017), journalist, television personality
- Daniel Stabrawa (born 1955), violinist and conductor
- Stanisław Żółtek (born 1956), politician
- Adam Nawałka (born 1957), football player
- Krzysztof Włosik (born 1957), archer
- Zbigniew Karkowski (1958–2013), composer and musician
- Piotr Lenar (born 1958), cinematographer
- Andrzej Iwan (1959–2022), football player
- Jan Karaś (born 1959), football player and football trainer
- Jan Rokita (born 1959), politician
- Bogdan Klich (born 1960), politician
- Janusz Kurtyka (1960–2010), historian and second president of the Institute of National Remembrance
- Jarosław Gowin (born 1961), politician and Minister of Justice
- Andrzej Kremer (1961–2010), jurist, diplomat, and Deputy Minister of Foreign Affairs
- Janusz Nawrocki (born 1961), football player
- Piotr Skrobowski (born 1961), football player
- Robert Makłowicz (born 1963), food critic, journalist, historian and television personality
- Marcin Baran (born 1963), poet and editor
- Wiesław Śpiewak (born 1963), Catholic religious priest, Bishop of Hamilton in Bermuda
- Grzegorz Ryś (born 1964), Roman Catholic bishop, Archbishop of Łódź
- Grzegorz Turnau (born 1967), composer, pianist, poet, and singer
- Ewa Drzyzga (born 1967), journalist and TV presenter
- Mirosław Waligóra (born 1970), football player
- Paweł Deląg(born 1970), actor
- Zbigniew Ziobro (born 1970), politician and jurist
- Mikołaj Budzanowski (born 1971), Minister of State Treasury
- Marek Koźmiński (born 1971), football player
- Andrzej Duda (born 1972), President of Poland
- Agata Kornhauser-Duda (born 1972), current First Lady of Poland and former teacher
- Abel Korzeniowski (born 1972), composer of film and theatre scores
- Jan Krasnowolski (born 1972) Polish crime writer
- Maja Ostaszewska (born 1972), actress
- Tomasz Rząsa (born 1973), football player
- Małgorzata Szumowska (born 1973), film director
- Jadwiga Emilewicz (born 1974), Deputy Prime Minister of Poland
- Dorota Siudek (born 1975), football player
- Maciej Stuhr (born 1975), actor, comedian, and occasional film director
- DJ Tomekk (born 1975), hip hop DJ and music producer

==== 1976 to 2000 ====
- Marek Baster (born 1976), football player
- Małgosia Bela (born 1977), fashion model and actress
- Maria Husarska (born 1981), artist
- Łukasz Sosin (born 1977), football player
- Łukasz Surma (born 1977), football player
- Magdalena Boczarska (born 1978), actress
- Gromee (born 1978), DJ, remixer, and music producer
- Ludwika Paleta (born 1978), Polish Mexican actress and model
- Joanna Liszowska (born 1978), actress
- Mirosław Spiżak (born 1979), football player
- Mariusz Wach (born 1979), professional boxer
- Piotr Bagnicki (born 1980), football player
- Piotr Giza (born 1980), football player
- Marcin Wasilewski (born 1980), football player
- Andrzej Domański (born 1981), economist, politician
- Maciej Iwański (born 1981), footballer
- Władysław Kosiniak-Kamysz (born 1981), physician and politician
- Chris Pozniak (born 1981), football player
- Radosław Zawrotniak (born 1981), fencer
- Daria Werbowy (born 1983), fashion model
- Maciej Bębenek (born 1984), football player
- Jakub Kornhauser (born 1984), poet, literary critic, and Romance philologist
- Robert Kubica (born 1984), Formula One driver
- Tomasz Marczyński (born 1984), road racing cyclist
- Piotr Polczak (born 1986), football player
- Michał Pazdan (born 1987), football player
- Agnieszka Radwańska (born 1989), tennis player
- Piotr Orzechowski (born 1990), jazz pianist and composer
- Karol Basz (born 1991), racing driver
- Katarzyna Wasick (born 1992), swimmer
- Aleksandra Jarecka (born 1995), fencer
- Tomasz Fornal (born 1997), volleyball player
- Jan-Krzysztof Duda (born 1998), chess grandmaster

== Notable people who lived in Krakow or with connections to Krakow ==
=== Until 1800 ===
- Stanislaus of Szczepanów (1030–1079), Bishop of Krakow
- Hyacinth of Poland (1183–1257), Dominican priest and missionary
- János Thurzó (1437–1508), entrepreneur and mining engineer
- Nicolaus Cracoviensis (?–1550), composer
- Veit Stoss (Polish: Wit Stwosz; (1447–1553), sculptor
- Jacob Pollak (ca. 1460–1541), rabbi, founder of Talmudic yeshiva in Krakow
- Nicolaus Copernicus (Polish: Mikołaj Kopernik; 1473–1543), studied here
- Hans von Kulmbach (1480–1522), German artist
- Roizl Fishels (fl. 16th century), printer and teacher
- Israel ben Josef (ca. 1500 – 1568), founder of the Remah Synagogue
- Joshua Höschel ben Joseph (ca. 1578 – 1648), rabbi
- Yom-Tov Lipmann Heller (ca. 1579 – 1654), rabbi
- Avraham Yehoshua Heschel (1595–1663), rabbi
- Augustus II (1670–1733), crowned King of Poland in Krakow, Head of State of the Polish-Lithuanian Commonwealth.

=== After 1801 ===
- Ludwik Karol Teichmann (1823–1895), anatomist
- Emil Czyrniański (1824–1888), chemist
- Napoleon Cybulski (1854–1919), physiologist, pioneer of endocrinology, rector of the Jagiellonian University
- Maurycy Gottlieb (1856–1879), Jewish Polish painter
- Teodor Talowski (1857–1910), architect
- Stanisław Zaremba (1863–1942), mathematician and engineer
- Ignacy Daszyński (1866–1936), Polish socialist politician, journalist, and the first Prime Minister of the Second Polish Republic
- Dagny Juel (1867–1901), Norwegian writer
- Józef Piłsudski (1867–1935), Marshal and politician
- Stanisław Przybyszewski (1868–1927), writer
- Vladimir Lenin (1870–1924), Russian revolutionary, politician, and political theorist, lived in Kraków in the years 1912–1914
- Ozjasz Thon (1870–1936), rabbi, Zionist
- Rudolf Weigl (1883–1957), biologist, physician and inventor, known for creating the first effective vaccine against epidemic typhus
- Stanisław Kot (1885–1975), historian and politician, professor at the Jagiellonian University
- Georg Trakl (1887–1914), expressionist
- Ivo Andrić (1892–1975), writer, diplomat, politician, and winner of 1961 Nobel Prize in Literature
- Maria Jarema (1908–1958), painter, sculptor, scenographer
- Oskar Schindler (1908–1974), entrepreneur
- Czesław Miłosz (1911–2004), poet and winner of 1980 Nobel prize in Literature
- Pope John Paul II (1920–2005), born as Karol Wojtyła in Wadowice, Bishop of Krakow
- Stanisław Lem (1921–2006), philosopher, essayist and science-fiction author
- Wisława Szymborska (1923–2012), poet, essayist, translator, and winner of 1996 Nobel Prize in Literature
- Piotr Skrzynecki (1930–1997), founder of the Piwnica pod Baranami cabaret
- Friedrich Magirius (born 1930), former superintendent in Leipzig, honorary citizen of Krakow
- Czesław Olech (1931–2015), mathematician, member of the Kraków School of Mathematics
- Krzysztof Penderecki (1933–2020), composer
- Roman Polański (born 1933), film director, screenwriter, and actor
- Maja Komorowska (born 1937), actress
- Zbigniew Wodecki (1950–2017), singer, musician and composer
- Janusz Filipiak (1952–2023), computer scientist and entrepreneur, founder of Comarch
- Nigel Kennedy (born 1956), violinist
- Rafał Brzoska (born 1977), entrepreneur, founder of Inpost
- Jarosław Duda (born 1980), computer scientist and an assistant professor at the Jagiellonian University, inventor of asymmetric numeral systems (ANS)
- Viki Gabor (born 2007), singer-songwriter

== See also ==
- List of mayors of Kraków
- List of voivodes of Kraków
- Rectors of the Jagiellonian University
- List of universities and colleges in Kraków
- History of Kraków
- List of events in Kraków
- Culture of Kraków
- List of Poles
