= Basting =

Basting, Baste, or Basted may refer to:

- Baste, Palghar district, Maharashtra, India
- Basting (cooking), a cooking technique
- Basted, Kent, a hamlet in England
- A type of stitch in sewing

== People ==
- Manuel Basté (1899–1977), Spanish water polo player
- Pierre Baste (1768–1814), French admiral and general
- Anne Basting, American gerontologist and professor
- Johan Hendrik Christiaan Basting (1817–1870), Dutch surgeon and military personnel
- Yvette Basting (born 1977), Dutch tennis player

== See also ==
- Baster (disambiguation)
