= Włodzimierz Karpiński =

Polish politician (born 1961)

Włodzimierz Witold Karpiński
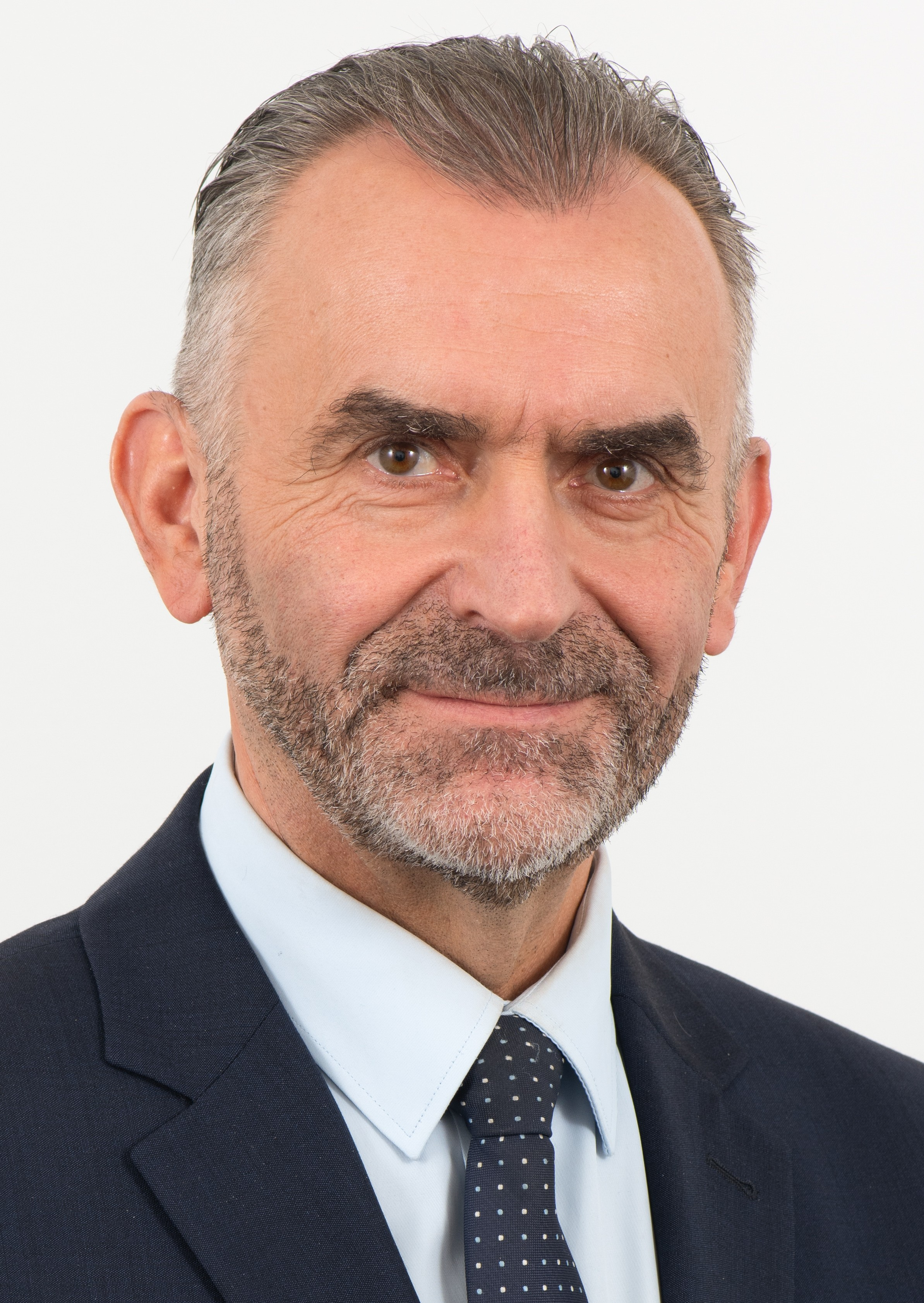

Member of the Sejm
- In office 25 September 2005 – 2019
- Constituency: 6 – Lublin

Personal details
- Born: 1961 (age 64–65)
- Party: Civic Platform

Włodzimierz Witold Karpiński (born 16 November 1961 in Puławy) is a Polish politician. Karpiński served as Minister of State Treasury in the Cabinets of Donald Tusk and Ewa Kopacz.

== Early life ==
Włodzimierz Witold Karpiński was born in Puławy on 16 November 1961. He graduated from the Warsaw University of Technology in 1990 with a degree in chemical engineering, and later received a degree in management from the University of Warsaw. He worked as manager and entrepreneur before going into politics. From 1994, he was vice president of Puławy and also a member of the city council.

== Political career ==
Karpiński was elected to the Sejm on 25 September 2005, getting 8,751 votes in 6 Lublin district as a candidate from the Civic Platform list. He was deputy Minister of Interior and Administration in 2011 and then deputy Minister of Administration and Digitization from 2011 to 2013. On 19 April 2013 he was nominated to be the next Minister of Treasury in Poland, following the dismissal of Mikołaj Budzanowski. He was minister from 24 April 2013 until 15 June 2015.

Karpiński decided not to run in the 2019 Polish parliamentary election, and became president of the Miejskie Przedsiębiorstwo Oczyszczania, a waste management company that handles waste collection for Warsaw. In 2023, he became the Member of the European Parliament.

== Personal life ==
Karpiński is married and has five sons.

== See also ==
- Members of Polish Sejm 2005-2007
