= Baster (disambiguation) =

The Basters are an ethnic group in Namibia.

Baster may also refer to:

- Baster, a kitchen utensil; see basting (cooking)
- Baster (band), French musical group

== People with the surname ==
- Job Baster (1711–1775), Dutch physician and naturalist
- Marek Baster (born 1976), Polish footballer
