= Baste =

Village in Maharashtra

Baste Basta
- village
- Location in Maharashtra, India Baste (India)
- Coordinates: 19.72865478°N 73.1300211°E
- Country: India
- State: Maharashtra
- District: Palghar
- Taluka: Vikramgad
- Elevation: 57 m (187 ft)

Population (2011)
  - Total: 505
- Time zone: UTC+5:30 (IST)
- 2011 census code: 551837

Baste, also known as Basta, is a village in the Palghar district of Maharashtra, India. It is located in the Vikramgad taluka.

== Demographics ==
According to the 2011 census of India, Baste has 113 households. The effective literacy rate (i.e. the literacy rate of population excluding children aged 6 and below) is 80.68%.

Demographics (2011 Census)
	Total	Male	Female
Population	505	229	276
Children aged below 6 years	65	22	43
Scheduled caste	0	0	0
Scheduled tribe	384	169	215
Literates	355	182	173
Workers (all)	293	139	154
Main workers (total)	199	93	106
Main workers: Cultivators	189	89	100
Main workers: Agricultural labourers	6	2	4
Main workers: Household industry workers	0	0	0
Main workers: Other	4	2	2
Marginal workers (total)	94	46	48
Marginal workers: Cultivators	13	6	7
Marginal workers: Agricultural labourers	76	37	39
Marginal workers: Household industry workers	0	0	0
Marginal workers: Others	5	3	2
Non-workers	212	90	122
