= Jan Krasnowolski =

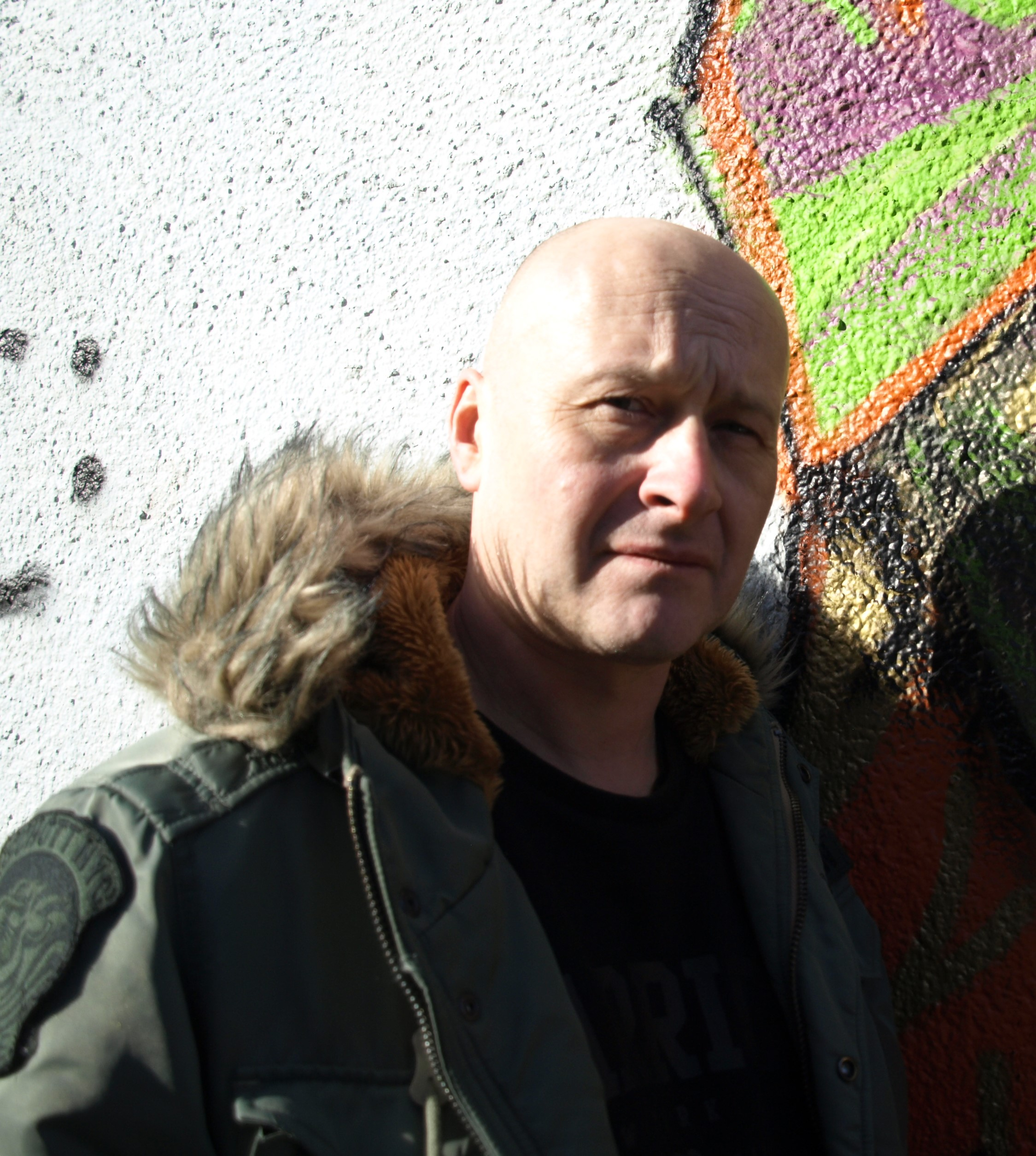
- Born: 10 September 1972 (age 54); Kraków, Poland
- Occupation: Crime writer

Jan Krasnowolski (born 10 September 1972) is a Polish crime writer.

In 2006, he settled in Bournemouth, England.

== Books ==
- 9 łatwych kawałków, 2001. Zielona Sowa, Cracow
- Klatka, 2006. Korporacja Ha!art, Cracow
- Afrykańska elektronika, 2013. Korporacja Ha!art, Cracow
- Syreny z Broadmoor, 2017. Świat Książki, Warszawa
- Czas wilków, czas psów, 2019. Świat Książki, Warszawa
