= Gustav Adolf Platz =

German architect

Gustav Adolf Platz (November 21, 1881, Kraków - September 13, 1947, Mannheim) was a German architect.

He worked with Fritz Schumacher in Hamburg, then as an architect engineer for the City of Mannheim (starting in 1913). He later served as manager of the architectural section (Stadtbaudirektor) of the City of Mannheim (1923–1932).

== Literary works ==
- Die Baukunst der neuesten Zeit, 1927 ()
