= Anne Basting =

American gerontologist

- Occupation: Professor
- Known for: founder of TimeSlips, pioneer in creative aging
- Awards: MacArthur Fellowship, Ashoka Fellow

Academic background
- Education: Colorado College; University of Wisconsin–Madison; University of Minnesota

Academic work
- Discipline: Gerontologist, Artist and Writer
- Institutions: University of Wisconsin-Milwaukee
- Website: www.anne-basting.com

Anne Davis Basting, is an American gerontologist working as a professor of English at the University of Wisconsin-Milwaukee's Peck School of the Arts. Her work centers around aging, memory, and dementia, both from the point of view of the elderly and that of society; and of the uses of theater, storytelling, and other arts in eldercare. She is one of the 2016 MacArthur Fellows (recipients of the $625,000 so-called "genius grants").

== Life ==
She graduated from Colorado College, the University of Wisconsin–Madison with a master's degree in theatre, and the University of Minnesota with a PhD in theatre arts.

== Publications ==
=== Books ===
- The Stages of Age: Performing Age in Contemporary American Culture. University of Michigan Press. 1998. ISBN 0-472-10939-1.
- The arts and dementia care: A resource guide, New York: National Center for Creative Aging, 2003, ISBN 9780982337325
- Forget Memory: Creating Better Lives for People with Dementia. JHU Press. 1 November 2009. ISBN 978-0-8018-9649-1.
- TimeSlips Creativity Journal. UWM Center on Age & Community, 2004, ISBN 9780982337301
- Anne Basting; Maureen Towey; Ellie Rose, eds. (15 May 2016). The Penelope Project: An Arts-Based Odyssey to Change Elder Care. University of Iowa Press. pp. 5–. ISBN 978-1-60938-414-2.

=== Journals ===
- Basting, A. D. (2001) "God is a talking horse: Performance of self in dementia". The Drama Review 45(3): 78–94.
- Basting, A. D. (2003) "Looking back from loss: Performing the ‘self' in Alzheimer’s disease". Journal of Aging Studies 17(1): 87–99.
- Basting, A. D. (2006) "The arts and dementia care". Generations 30(1): 16–20.
- De Medeiros, K., and A. D. Basting (2013) "Shall I compare thee to a dose of Donepezil?: Cultural arts interventions in dementia care research".The Gerontologist 54(3): 344–353.
- McFadden S., and A. D. Basting (2010) "Healthy aging persons and their brains: Promoting resilience through creative engagement". Clinics in Geriatric Medicine 26(1): 149–161.
