= Mikołaj Budzanowski =

Polish manager and civil servant

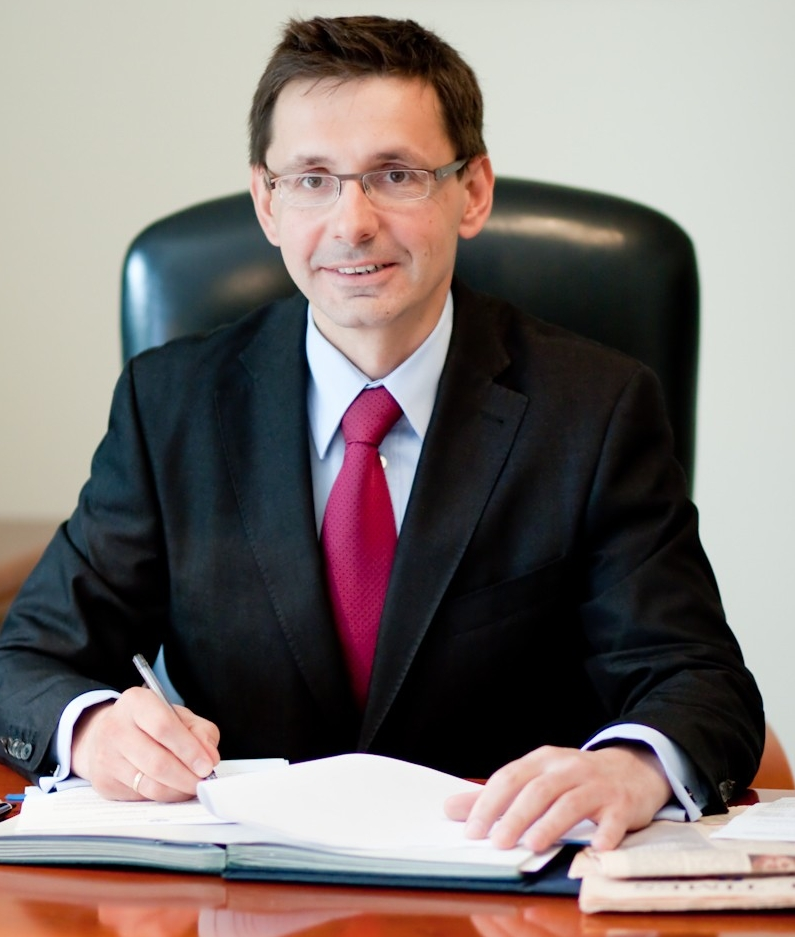
- Mikołaj Budzanowski in office

Ministry of State Treasury
- In office 2011–2013
- Preceded by: Aleksander Grad
- Succeeded by: Włodzimierz Karpiński

Personal details
- Born: November 11, 1971 (age 54) Kraków, Poland
- Party: Apolitical (recommended by Civic Platform)
- Education: Jagiellonian University

Mikołaj Budzanowski is a Polish manager and civil servant, from 2009 until 2011, Undersecretary of State in the Ministry of the Treasury, and from 2011 to 2013 the Minister of the Treasury of the Republic of Poland.

== Early life and education ==
In 1990–1996 he studied at the Faculty of History at the Jagiellonian University, then held, inter alia, postgraduate studies in the field of diplomacy and international relations at his alma mater. He was a fellow at the University of Trier, the Japanese Nippon Foundation and Deutsch Akademischer Austausch Dienst (DAAD). In 2004, received the degree of Doctor of Humanities.

== Career ==
From 2004 to 2007 he worked as a consultant in the Polish delegation to the European Parliament. From January to September 2008 was director of the Department of Climate Change and Sustainable Development of the Ministry of Environment, and from September 2008 to July 2009 he served as Director of the Department of Ownership Supervision and Privatisation Ministry of Treasury. July 20, 2009 he was appointed Secretary of State in the Ministry.

From November 2011 to April 2013 Minister of Treasury of the Republic of Poland.

=== Board membership ===
He is a Member of the Management Board of Boryszew SA, and the author of analysis in the fields of energy and innovation in "Rzeczpospolita" daily newspaper.
