= Johan Hendrik Christiaan Basting =

Dutch army surgeon

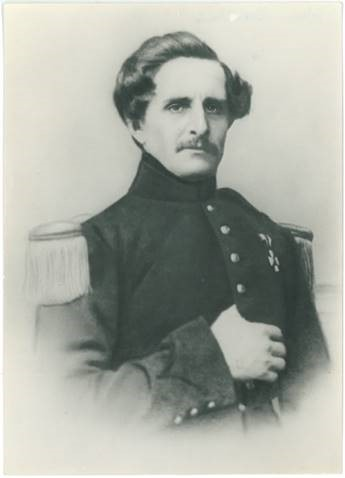
- Basting, ca. 1860
- Born: 20 September 1817; Enkhuizen
- Died: 24 September 1870 (aged 53); The Hague

Johan Hendrik Christiaan Basting (20 September 1817 – 24 September 1870) was a Dutch army surgeon and friend of Red Cross founder Henri Dunant. He played an important role during the establishment in 1863 of the International Committee of the Red Cross (ICRC), and from that year on he was an advocate for the establishment of a national voluntary aid organization in the Netherlands, the Netherlands Red Cross established in 1867.

== Biography ==
=== Youth, early career, and marriage ===
Basting was born in Enkhuizen on 20 September 1817, the son of hospital master Dingeman Cornelis Basting and Frederika Sophia Wilhelmina Schneider. He was 17 years old when he was admitted as a student at the National Institute for Military Medicine in Utrecht. In 1839 he became army physician Class 3. In 1844 Basting was placed in Breda, where he became Officer of Health Class 2. After a short interim period in Maastricht, he was transferred to Gorinchem. In 1853 he was promoted to Officer of Health Class 1 and transferred to Leiden. The following year he married in Gorinchem with Amalie Fréderique Kattenbusch, born in Eschweiler. He received his PhD in Leiden on 12 March 1855. In the same year he was transferred from Leiden to the Regiment Grenadiers and Jagers in The Hague where he would stay until 1870, with a short break due to an interim transfer to Bergen op Zoom

=== First contact with Henri Dunant ===
A certain Pauline Micheli-Revilliod advised Henri Dunant in 1862 to send Johan Basting a copy of his book Un Souvenir de Solferino. Dunant had written it after having witnessed the suffering at the Battle of Solferino. He then asked Basting to translate the book from French to Dutch. Basting did so, and became fascinated by the Dunant's plea in his book to set up voluntary organizations in all countries that could become lifesaving in the case of armed conflict. The Dutch translation of Dunant's book appeared in Dutch in 1863

=== Establishment of the Red Cross Movement ===
On September 8, 1863, Basting participated on behalf of the Netherlands in the 5th International Statistical Congress that took place in Berlin. Dunant was also present at his invitation because it gave both the opportunity to inform the participating countries about Dunant's idea to set up national aid associations in all countries. Dunant and Basting were helped by Bastings wife, Amalie Kattenburg-Basting, who had met Basting in Gorinchem. Amalie helped with translations and the layout of pamphlets that were distributed there and with the haste and adaptation of the invitation for an international conference that they hoped to organize in October that year in Geneva with interested countries. The lobby in Berlin was a success and already in October of that year the first International Conference of the Red Cross took place in Geneva. On 22 August 1864 this led to the Geneva Convention, ratified by 16 countries. This laid the foundation for International Humanitarian Law . The committee in Geneva, then consisting of five Swiss including Dunant and later called the International Committee of the Red Cross (ICRC), became the custodian of International Humanitarian Law.

=== Establishment of a national Red Cross Society in the Nederlands and his death ===
Earlier that year, in April 1864, Basting published a leaflet called Eene roepstem tot mijn vaderland: De hulpmaatschappijen tot verzorging van zieken en gekwetsten in which he pleaded for the establishment of a national Red Cross Society in the Netherlands. In 1866, Basting moved from The Hague to Bergen op Zoom. Despite Bastings' call and the support he received from people like Henry CN Baron van Tuyll of Serooskerken and General Knoop, after a four-year long period of delays, on 19 July 1867, by a Koninklijk besluit, the Nederlandsche Vereeniging finally granted aid. to sick and wounded warriors in time of war . Because of the protection sign to be used in wartime - a red cross on a white surface - the association was soon called the Nederlandse Rode Kruis, but officially the association did not name it until after 1895. In 1868 Basting contributed to the establishment and organization of local Red Cross aid committees in the Netherlands with his book De Nederlandsche Hulpkomités onder het Roode Kruis. Hun werkkring in tijden van oorlog en vrede. Their office in times of war and peace . He also put this into practice himself by setting up a Red Cross auxiliary committee in Bergen op Zoom on 24 March 1868.

Basting became ill in the spring of 1870 and died on 24 September that year as a result of liver disease in The Hague. He was buried on the 27th of September at Oud Eik en Duinen in The Hague.

=== Importance to the Red Cross ===
In the early years, Basting was the main international promoter of Dunant's plea to establish national Red Cross associations. Although Dunant had previously been present as an observer at the conference in Berlin, he had been given a specific mandate from the "Committee of Five" in Geneva. But at the urging of Basting, Dunant in Berlin, without any consultation with his Geneva colleague committee members, added three points to the plea that Basting presented, including the principle of Neutrality. Once in the invitation and in the agenda, co-founders could not simply ignore this. Johan Basting subsequently proved also to be crucial during the subsequent International Conference in 1863, in particular with regard to the introduction of the principle of Neutrality for Red Cross volunteers and medical objects such as ambulances, clinics and hospitals in times of war. Henri Dunant wrote to his Dutch friend and journalist Haje that it was "avec sa tenacité hollandaise" (his Dutch tenacity) that had been the decisive factor in the endorsement of the fundamental principle of Neutrality by the States present. "In the Netherlands, Johan Basting was important because of his advocacy for the establishment of a national volunteer aid association, the Netherlands Red Cross Society.

=== Basting's Réveil background ===
Basting, his Swiss friend Dunant, and the first Red Cross volunteer who - together with another Swiss (Dr. Louis Appia, with Dunant and three other Swiss co-founder of the ICRC) - was sent to a war front, the Dutchman (and painter / writer) Charles William Meredith van de Velde, were all born in a Calvinistic Réveil environment. The Réveil movement originated in Geneva at the beginning of the 19th century in response to The Enlightenment. All three had from childhood learned to take care of others, for example Dunant visited with his parents prisoners, and they helped poor in their community. Basting and his wife Amalie have translated a number of writings from the Geneva Réveil theologian and philosopher Jules-Ernest Naville from French into Dutch. And Dunant organized meetings for fellow believers in Geneva. Van de Velde has visited one or more such meetings in Geneva, Basting has likely never been in Geneva. It was this international network of Dunant that brought him in contact with Johan Basting in 1862. Dunant was a critic of institutionalized church and was an agnost.

=== Credits ===
- On 6 January 1860 Johan Basing was honoured by King William III as knight in the Orde van de Eikenkroon.
- Koning Willem III made Basting on 31 July 1867 honorary member of the Het Nederlandse Rode Kruis.
- In 1871 the Netherlands Red Cross placed a marble tombstone on his grave.

=== Tomb Oud Eijk en Duinen, The Hague ===
Basting was buried in The Hague. In 1871 the Dutch Red Cross placed this gravestone on its final resting place.

=== Bibliography ===
Beneath works were written by Johan Basting:

- Raadgevingen aan de Nederlandse comité's onder het Roode Kruis, Den Haag, 1870
- De Nederlandsche Hulpkomités onder het Roode Kruis. Hun werkkring in tijden van oorlog en vrede, Den Haag, 1868
- Memorie over het stelsel van ziekenverstrooiing in “Verslagen, rapporten en memoriën omtrent militaire onderwerpen “ uitgegeven door het Departement van Oorlog”, 1866
- Eene roepstem tot mijn vaderland. De hulpmaatschappijen tot verzorging van zieken en gekwetsten aanbevolen, Den Haag, 1864
- Morburum in Nosocomio Lugduni Batav. Militari Anno 1854, Curatorum Historiam Generalem, proefschrift, 1855
- Mededeelingen over voorgewende ziekten in tijdschrift “Boerhave“, maart 1842

=== Translations ===
Beneath works were translated by Johan Basting:

- Dunant (1862) Un souvenir de Solferino vertaling gepubliceerd mei 1863, Solferino: De stem der menschheid op het slagveld
- Dunant, met steun van Basting, de drie Berlijnse artikelen, 1863
- Erlenmeyer, De zielsziekten en derzelver aanvankelijke behandeling, vertaling, Den Haag, 1860, opnieuw uitgegeven in 1865
- Naville, J. E., Ernest Renan als schrijver van het "Leven van Jezus", vertaling, Den Haag, 1864
- Naville, J. E., Onze Hemelsche Vader: eene getuigenis tegen het ongeloof onzer dagen, vertaling, Den Haag, 1865
- Naville, J. E., Het stelsel van Hegel, vertaling, Den Haag, 1867
- Naville, J. E., Het vraagstuk van het kwaad, vertaling, Den Haag, 1867

== Notes and references ==
=== References ===
- Lieburg, Fred van, in “Opwekking van de natie: Het protestantse Réveil in Nederland” (2012), “Het Rode Kruis en het Diakonessenwezen”
- International Review of the Red Cross (2012), “ICRC: 150 years of humanitarian Action”
- Van Bergen, Leo (1994), “De zwaargewonden eerst?: Het Nederlandsche Roode Kruis en het vraagstuk van oorlog en vrede 1867-1945”
- Rombach, J.H. in Universeel, Belgische RK in Vlaanderen (nr. 3 1978), “Dr. Johan Hendrik Christiaan Basting (1817-1870), de Nederlander aan de wieg van het Rode Kruis”, artikel van
- Carl H.J. Vandekerckhove (1978), “Jean-Henry Dunant: Droom en daad”
- Nederlandse Rode Kruis (1969), “Johan Hendrik Christiaan Basting, Sebald Justinus Brugmans”
- Verspijck, Jonkheer G.M. (1967), “Het Nederlandsche Roode Kruis”
- Rombach J.H. in International Review of the Red Cross (1962), “Two great figures in Red Cross history”
- Hart, Ellen (1953), “Man born to live: Life and Work of Henry Dunant, founder of the Red Cross”
- Beelaerts van Blokland, Jhr. H. (1942), “Dr. Johan Hendrik Christiaan Basting”
- Nieuw Nederlands Biografisch Woordenbook, deel 4 (1918)
- Rotterdams Nieuwsblad (26-02-1917), “De stichting van het Roode Kruis”
- Haje, Christian Friedrich in Elsevier (1897 Jan.-Jul., pag 438), “De stichter van het Roode Kruis”
- Müller, Rudolf (1896), "Entstehunsgeschichte des Roten Kreuzes und der Genfer Konvention"
- Haje, C.F. (1889), ”Een gedenkzuil der negentiende eeuw: Het Roode Kruis, oorsprong, geschiedenis, gevolgen”
- Brown, Samual (1863), “Report on the Fifth International Statistical Congress, held at Berlin, Sept. 6th to 12th, 1863”
- Dommelen, G.F. (4/11-06-1871), “Herinnering aan J.H.C. Basting”
- Dommelen, Gomarus Fransiscus van (1-01-1871), “Over de noodzakelijkheid der uitbreiding van het getal Ziekenverplegers en Ziekenverpleegsters door de Vereenigingen onder het Roode Kruis”
- Nuyens, Willem Jan Frans in Katholiek-Nederlandsche Brochuren-Vereniging (1870), “Het Roode Kruis: Een woord tot mijn landgenoten”
- Register begraafplaats Oud Eijk en Duinen te Den Haag
