= Jerzy Adam Brandhuber =

Polish painter and holocaust survivor (1897-1981)

- Born: 23 October 1897; Kraków, Second Polish Republic
- Died: 19 June 1981 (aged 83); Oświęcim, Polish People's Republic
- Education: Jan Matejko Academy of Fine Arts

Jerzy Adam Brandhuber (23 October 1897 – 19 June 1981) was a Polish painter and a survivor of the Auschwitz concentration camp.

== Life ==
Brandhuber was born in Kraków, Poland. After having graduated with a degree in pictorial arts at the Jan Matejko Academy of Fine Arts Jerzy Adam Brandhuber worked at a secondary school teaching arts before he was arrested by the Germans in 1942 for "helping the Jews". He was brought to the concentration camp of Auschwitz on 14 January 1943. Labeled with the inmate number 87112 he was assigned to work in the labor battalion distributing clothes. During an evacuation march out of the Sachsenhausen concentration camp he was freed on 3 May 1945 and lived in Lübeck after that.

In 1947 Brandhuber started working as a historian at the National Museum Auschwitz-Birkenau. Due to the limited availability of housing in Poland he received an official residence at the memorial place in which he lived till death.

Jerzy Adam Brandhuber created a cycle of paintings called Forgotten Earth in 1946 which conveys his memoirs of Auschwitz. Towards the end of his life he concentrated mainly on nude life drawings, portraits and landscapes. He died on 19 June 1981 at age 83 in Oświęcim.
