= Cristina Szalay de Wiedemann =

Polish-Columbian artist and conservator (1901–1991)

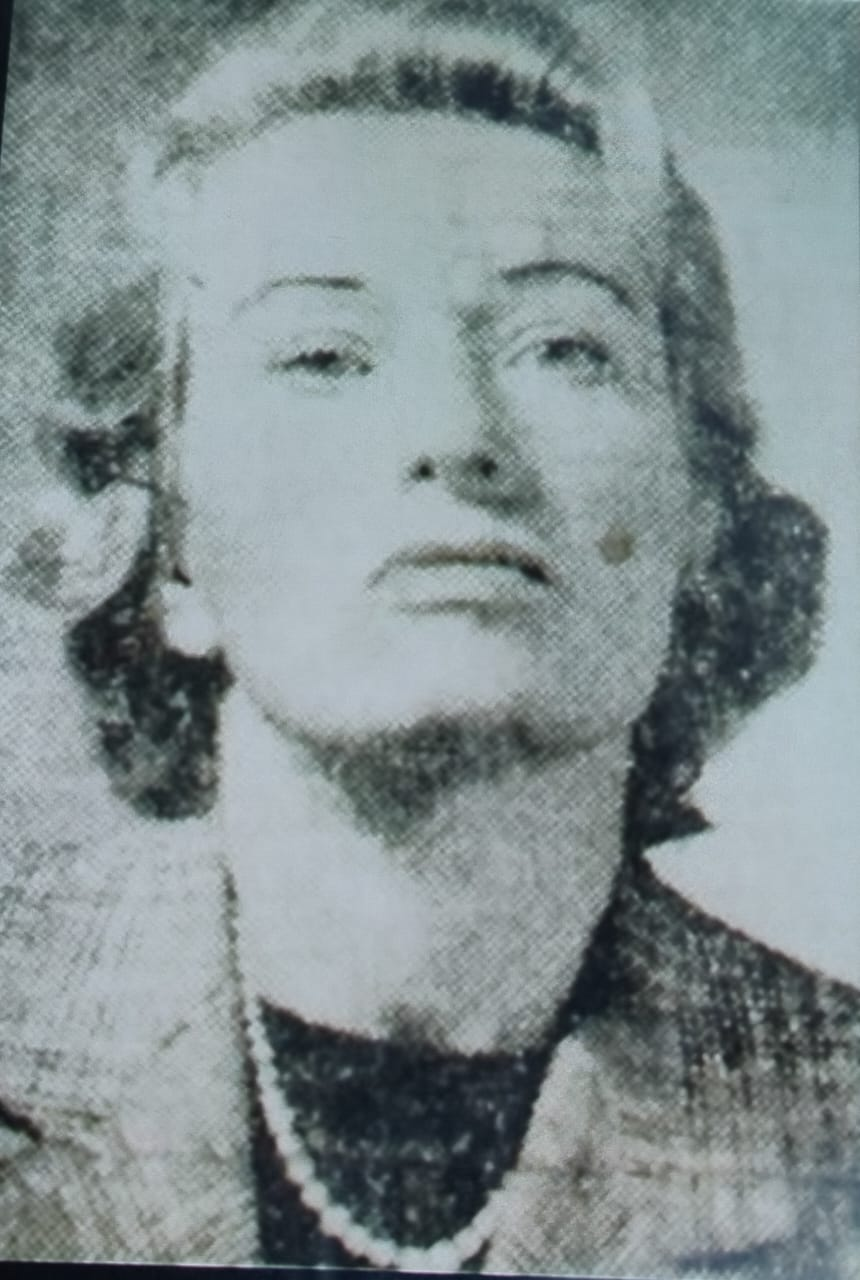
- Born: Christina Szalay; 26 March 1900; Kraków, Grand Duchy of Kraków, Austria-Hungary
- Died: 21 February 1991 (aged 90); Florida, US
- Other names: Cristina Szalay Wiedemann
- Occupations: Painter; conservator
- Spouse: Guillermo Wiedemann (m. 1953; died 1969)

Cristina Szalay de Wiedemann (née Szalay; 26 March 1900–1991) was a Polish–Colombian painter and conservator.

== Biography ==
Christina Szalay (Note: Also cited as "Cristina Szalay Chalupezynsky".) was born on 26 March 1900 (Note: Also cited as 1901.) in Kraków, Grand Duchy of Kraków (Note: Also cited as Warsaw, Congress Poland.) (present-day Poland) to Louis Szalay and Wanda Schoder.

Szalay first studied painting in either Kraków or Warsaw, before continuing her studies in Vienna. Szalay later studied under Willy Jaeckel (Note: Possibly at the Prussian Academy of Arts or at the Berlin University of the Arts.) in Berlin.

In 1942, Szalay immigrated to Bogotá, Colombia. In 1949, Szalay exhibited a series of portraits at a solo show at the National Museum of Colombia. In 1952, Szalay exhibited the painting "Yellow Blouse" at the IX Salón Anual de Artistas Colombianos.

From 1952 to 1964, Szalay worked as a paintings conservator at the National Museum of Colombia.

In 1969, Szalay was living in Key Biscayne, Florida. Szalay became a US citizen in the 1970s.

== Personal life ==
In 1953, Szalay married the German-Colombian painter Guillermo Wiedemann.

On 21 February 1991, (Note: Also cited as 1988.) Szalay died in Florida aged 90.
