= Roizl Fishels =

Roizl bas Yosef Fishels of Krakow (fl. 16th century) was a Polish Jewish printer and teacher.

Her paternal grandfather Rabbi Yehuda ha-Levi ran a yeshiva for fifty years in Ludomir. In 1586, she printed a translation of Tehillim into Yiddish by Moshe Stendel, prefaced by an autobiographical poem of her own.
