= Marek Baster =

Polish footballer

Personal information
- Date of birth: 11 June 1976 (age 50)
- Place of birth: Kraków, Poland
- Height: 1.72 m (5 ft 7 1/2 in)
- Position: Defender

Senior career*
Years	Team	Apps	(Gls)
- Tramwaj Kraków
- Pogoń Miechów
–1998	Sparta Kazimierza Wielka		
1998–2001	Cracovia	106	(10)
1999	→ Pogoń Miechów (loan)		
2001–2003	Stal Stalowa Wola		
2003–2007	Cracovia	72	(1)
2007–2009	Arka Gdynia	19	(0)
2009	Czarni Żagań	14	(0)
2009–2010	MZKS Alwernia	30	(1)
2010–2013	Sparta Kazimierza Wielka		
- * Club domestic league appearances and goals

Marek Baster (born 11 June 1976) is a Polish former professional footballer who played as a defender.

== Club career ==
Baster began his football career Tramwaj Kraków, and moved between lower division clubs before joining Cracovia in 1998.

He started playing for Stal Stalowa Wola in 2001, a third-tier team before returning to Kraków in 2004. He moved to Arka Gdynia in the II liga for the 2007–08 season.
