= Greenblatt's =

Restaurant information
- Established: 1926
- Closed: 2021
- Owner: Jeff Kavin
- Food type: Jewish delicatessen
- Dress code: Casual
- Location: 8017 Sunset Boulevard, Sunset Strip, West Hollywood, California, 90046, United States

Greenblatt's, also known as Greenblatt's Deli & Fine Wines, was a Jewish delicatessen established by Herman Greenblatt in 1926, and located on the Sunset Strip in West Hollywood, California, until its eventual closing in August 2021. Greenblatt's was an "iconic LA restaurant" according to The Hollywood Reporter.

== History ==
Greenblatt's Deli & Fine Wine Shop was initially located in South Central Los Angeles, which at the time was home to a large Jewish population, but it later moved to its location on the Sunset Strip. Greenblatt's was established in 1926 by Herman Greenblatt, who would later sell the deli to the Kavin family in 1946. The Kavin family retained ownership of the deli for 75 years until its eventual closing in 2021.

=== Closing ===
After 95 years of operations Greenblatt's Deli closed its doors on August 12, 2021. Longtime owner Jeff Kavin stated his intention to close the deli with dignity a little less than a month before the Jewish High Holiday season, and ensuing rush of catering orders.

== Celebrity clientele ==
Greenblatt's boasted a long list of notable celebrity patrons including Kirk Douglas, Marilyn Monroe, Joe DiMaggio, Groucho Marx, Errol Flynn, Orson Welles, Janis Joplin, Bing Crosby, Peter Lawford, Boris Karloff, Bobby Darin, Rita Hayworth; Bela Lugosi, Marlon Brando, Peter Lorre, Lenny Bruce, Robert Mitchum, John Belushi, Danny Kaye, and Billie Holiday were all said to be regulars at the deli.

== See also ==
- Mort's Palisades Deli
- Langer's Deli
- List of Ashkenazi Jewish restaurants
- Canter's
- Brent's Deli
