= Ben's Deli =

Ben's Deli may refer to:

- Ben's Kosher Deli, a Jewish deli chain based in Queens, New York and Long Island, New York with a location in Boca Raton, Florida, and a defunct Manhattan location
- Bens De Luxe Delicatessen & Restaurant (1908-2006), a defunct Montreal deli and renowned purveyor of Montreal-style smoked meat
- Ben & Esther's Vegan Jewish Deli, a vegan Jewish deli
