= Wolfie Cohen's Rascal House =

Jewish deli in Sunny Isles Beach, Florida, US

Coordinates: 25.9353°N 80.1218°W

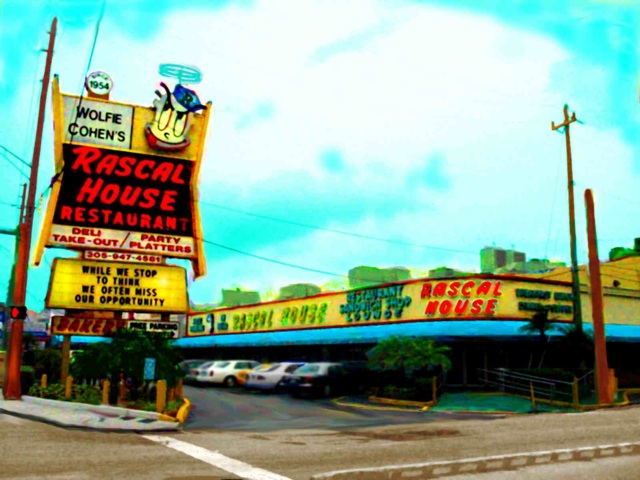
Wolfie Cohen's Rascal House

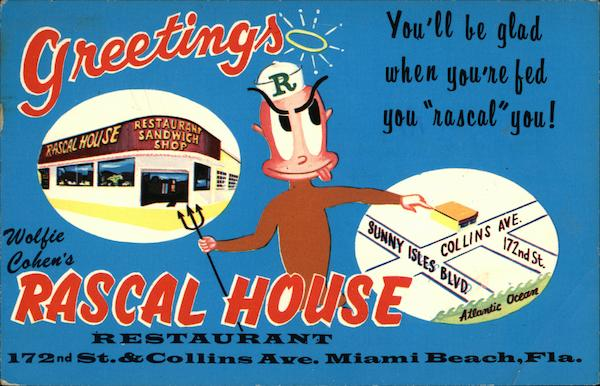
Wolfie Cohen's Rascal House postcard late 1960s.

Wolfie Cohen's Rascal House was a Jewish delicatessen located at the intersection of 172nd Street and Collins Avenue in Sunny Isles Beach, Florida. It opened in May 1954 and closed on March 30, 2008. Sporting a large neon sign in the front, the building was designed in the 1950s Miami Modern style.

The establishment catered to vacationing New Yorkers of Jewish descent; PanAmerican Airlines offered Wolfie's Cheesecake as a menu item on flights between Miami and New York, while Northeast Airlines had the restaurant cater its same flights exclusively. The neon sign makes an appearance at the beginning of the video for "Night Fever" by the Bee Gees.

Wolfie Cohen's Rascal House was established after the original Wolfie's, another Jewish deli and restaurant in Miami Beach, on the corner of Lincoln Road and Collins Avenue in South Beach (with another Wolfie's at 21st Street and Collins Avenue, a few blocks north). For several years, Wolfie's featured a sign that read "The only thing that needs to come dressed is our chickens!" (meaning dining was casual, not clothing optional). The restaurant at 21st Street closed in 2001. Cohen also founded a third Jewish deli, Pumpernik's, at 67th Street and Collins Avenue, which is also closed.

The restaurants became known for its baskets of unlimited assorted varieties of miniature rolls and danishes and stainless steel buckets of half-sour pickles, cold sauerkraut, and other vegetables that were served at no additional cost with meals. The recipes for the breads and danish came from head baker and pastry chef Manny Miklowitz, who learned his trade from his father, Sam Miklowitz, who owned two bakeries in Brooklyn, N.Y. Manny Miklowitz started at Pumpernik's and within a year was chosen by Wolfie Cohen to open the bake shop at the Rascal House in 1954. Manny Miklowitz continued to run the bake shop until he retired in 1974 and continued to reside in Miami Beach with his wife, Esther Gurfein Miklowitz.

Cohen's daughter, film actress Robin Sherwood, owned the Rascal House from her father's death in 1986 until 1996.

In 2005, Hurricane Wilma damaged both the original Rascal House sign and the building. The building was repaired and reopened but the old sign was torn down and replaced with a plain sign lower to the ground.

In 2008, Wolfie Cohen's Rascal House location was converted to an Epicure Gourmet Market, constructed by prominent local Builder Kevin M Rafferty of KMR Construction, owned by the corporation that bought Wolfie Cohen's Rascal House, Jerry's Famous Deli of Studio City, California. Originally, the Epicure Market was to be contained within a new condominium building on the location, but a downturn in the real estate market in the late 2000s (decade) put an end to the condominium project. Epicure Market closed in 2017. As of November 2022 the building sits vacant.

== Food ==
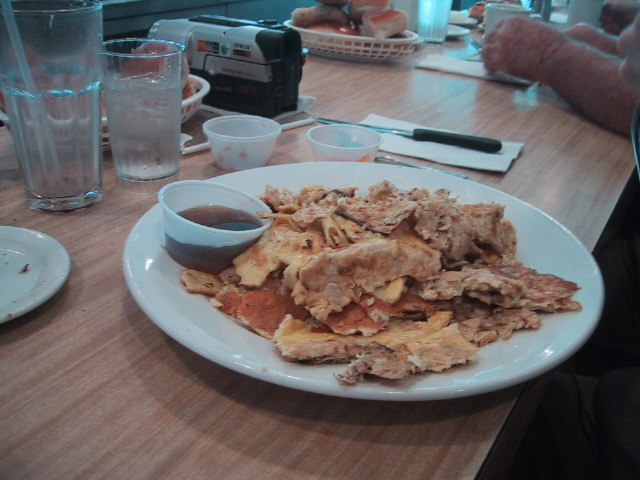
Matzoh brei, a traditional Jewish family breakfast recipe, was served at Rascal House.

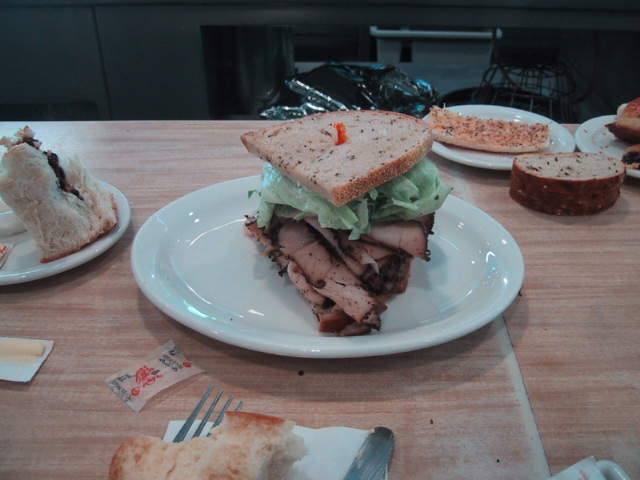
The stacked corned beef sandwich at Rascal House.

Rascal House had the quintessential elements of a Jewish delicatessen, namely a large selection of deli soups and sandwiches (typically listed on an oversized laminated menu), a bowl of cold pickles and a basket of assorted rolls for every table. While Rascal House's featured dish was their classic stacked corned beef sandwich, they also served Jewish home cooking, such as matzah brei, a breakfast meal consisting of strips of matzoh cooked like scrambled eggs.

== In pop culture ==
The establishment is often mentioned in the 1980s and early 1990s sitcom The Golden Girls. The sitcom is set in Miami, and the characters often refer to eating at "Wolfie's".

The restaurant is seen in passing during the Bee Gees video "Night Fever".

Wolfie's is also seen in Miami Vice, season 1 episode 19; in a brief scene Don Johnson's character is driving by the establishment.

Wolfie's is also seen in The Crew, a movie featuring Richard Dreyfuss and Burt Reynolds.

Carlos "El Puerco" Valdez tells Jessica Tate he was captured at Wolfie's in Miami in Season 4 Episode 4 of Soap.

Wolfie's is mentioned multiple times in the Dexter book series and is used (sparingly) as a location for main characters to convene.

== See also ==
- List of Ashkenazi Jewish restaurants
- List of delicatessens

== Sources ==
- One of Miami's top 10 restaurants
