= Mort's Palisades Deli =

- Interactive map of Mort's Palisades Deli

Restaurant information
- Established: 1972
- Closed: 2007
- Head chef: Mort and Bobbie Farberow
- Food type: Jewish delicatessen
- Dress code: Casual
- Location: 1035 Swarthmore Ave, Pacific Palisades, California, 90272, United States
- Coordinates: 34°02′54″N 118°31′31″W

Mort's Palisades Deli, more commonly referred to as Mort's Deli, was a Jewish delicatessen located at 1035 Swarthmore Ave on the corner of Sunset Boulevard in Pacific Palisades, California.

== History ==
In the early 1970s, Mort Farberow opened a butcher shop on Sunset Boulevard in the Village neighborhood of Pacific Palisades. Business was steady, but he was still unsatisfied with the direction of his business. Farberow and his wife Bobbie Farberow then relocated around the corner to Swarthmore Avenue, where they opened "Mort’s Palisades Deli" in 1972. Mort's could not have come along at a better time as the opening coincided with a massive growth of the Jewish community in the Palisades.

In 1978, Mort's moved to a larger location on the opposite side of the street at 1035 Swarthmore, where it remained until it closed its doors in 2007.

During the 1980s restaurant boom in the LA Southlands, the deli came under increasing competition with up to 30 delis opening in the Palisades area. Farberow responded to this by cutting waste and raising prices. By 1989, Farberow's was seeing a switch over to leaner meat, especially turkey, due to an increase in health-consciousness.

In 2005, the deli was hit by an armed robbery, the first in its history.

Original owner and proprietor Mort Farberow once said in an interview with the Jewish Journal, “We make 99 percent of our food from scratch [including all the soups]. Being there seven days a week, getting to know the people, has made Mort’s the institution it is today."

Generations of Palisadians grew up eating at Mort's Deli, only to return with their own children. It became a fixture of the community and an important landmark in the local culture, and much of the deli's staff had worked at Mort's for decades. The 2000 Fodor's guide to LA praised especially the variety of foods available on the menu.

=== Closing ===
Farberow died in 2002, and in 2007 his widow Bobbie decided to sell the deli to former Los Angeles mayor and area resident Richard Riordan, who owned several other eateries in the Pacific Palisades area including the seafood restaurant Gladstones and the Original Pantry restaurant in downtown Los Angeles. Riordan re-opened the deli under the name "Village Pantry" in 2008. Eater magazine described the re-opened deli as "wiped clean of its former self (save for the "planned" memorial wall for former owners Mort and Bobbie Farberow)" and criticized the raised prices.

== Celebrity clientele ==
Mort’s boasted a long list of notable celebrity patrons including Larry David, Larry King, and Marlon Brando. One day, Marlon Brando came into the deli and proprietor Mort Farberow was the only person in the place who recognized him. Another time in 2001, actor and local resident Steve Guttenberg was having lunch with his mother at Mort's when he encountered fellow actors and former honorary mayors Martin Short and Anthony Hopkins. Guttenberg's mother was encouraging him to run for honorary mayor of the Palisades at the time, and recalling the memory at the deli Guttenberg said, "My mom went up to Tony and said, 'Excuse me, Hannibal, should my son be mayor?' Hopkins replied, 'It would be a wonderful thing.'"Guttenberg would later serve as honorary mayor of Pacific Palisades.

== In popular culture ==
Mort's Palisades Deli was featured prominently in several episodes of the HBO original series Curb Your Enthusiasm as "Leo's Deli".

== Legacy ==
On January 3, 2020, local city councilman Mike Bonin named Bobbie Farberow, former owner of Mort's Deli and widow of founder Mort Farberow, who Bonin said is a "community volunteer extraordinaire", the 2019 honoree representing Pacific Palisades as part of his annual tradition of selecting a representative to be honored for the work they do for each of the neighborhoods he represents.

== See also ==
- Langer's Deli
- List of Ashkenazi Jewish restaurants
- Canter's
- Brent's Deli
