= History of the Jews in San Diego =

History of Jews in San Diego County

The history of Jews in San Diego dates to the middle of the 19th century. Home to a Jewish community of around 135,000 people, around 3% of the metropolitan area's total population, San Diego has one of the largest Jewish populations in the United States. It is home to over 56,000 households from a 2022 study,showing a 13 percent growth from 2003.

== 1800s ==
Louis Rose is known as one of the first Jewish citizens in San Diego, arriving in 1850. The first Jewish religious service in San Diego was held in 1851. The first congregation, called Adat Yeshurun, later changing to Beth Israel, was founded in 1861.

In the 1870s, when the town center moved, the congregation did as well. In 1871, the first Hebrew Benevolent Society was founded by Marcus Schiller. In 1889, the first Temple Beth Israel was built at Second Avenue and Beech Street. It was occupied by the congregation until 1926.

== 1900s ==
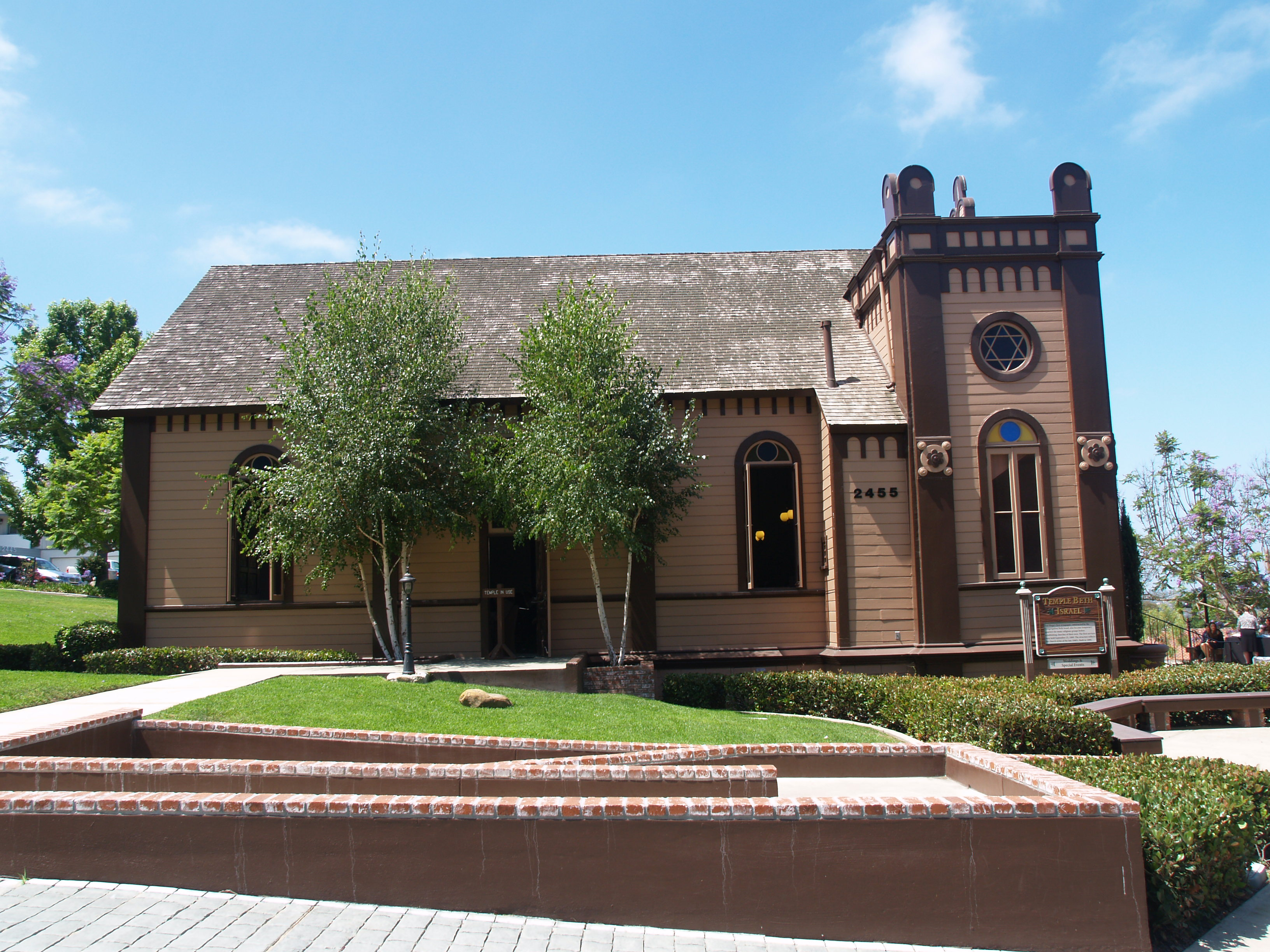
Temple Beth Israel, the first synagogue building in Heritage Park in San Diego's Old Town area

In 1926, the Beth Israel congregation moved from the first Temple Beth Israel to a larger temple at Third and Laurel. In the 1970s, the original temple was going to be demolished, but was spared due to the combined efforts of past Beth Israel President Jim Milch and other congregation members.

From the 1970s-1990s, rapid growth led to the construction of many new synagogues. As of 2025, they number to around 20 congregations.

== 2000s ==
In October of 2001, a newer temple was erected. The number of Jewish citizens had grown since the first congregation in 1851.

== See also ==
- D.Z. Akin's
- History of the Jews in Los Angeles
- Jewish Federation of San Diego County
- San Diego Jewish Academy
- San Diego Jewish Film Festival
- San Diego Jewish Journal
- San Diego Jewish World
- Torah High Schools of San Diego
- History of the Jews in the American West
