= Katz's Deli (Houston) =

Restaurant in Houston, Texas, U.S.

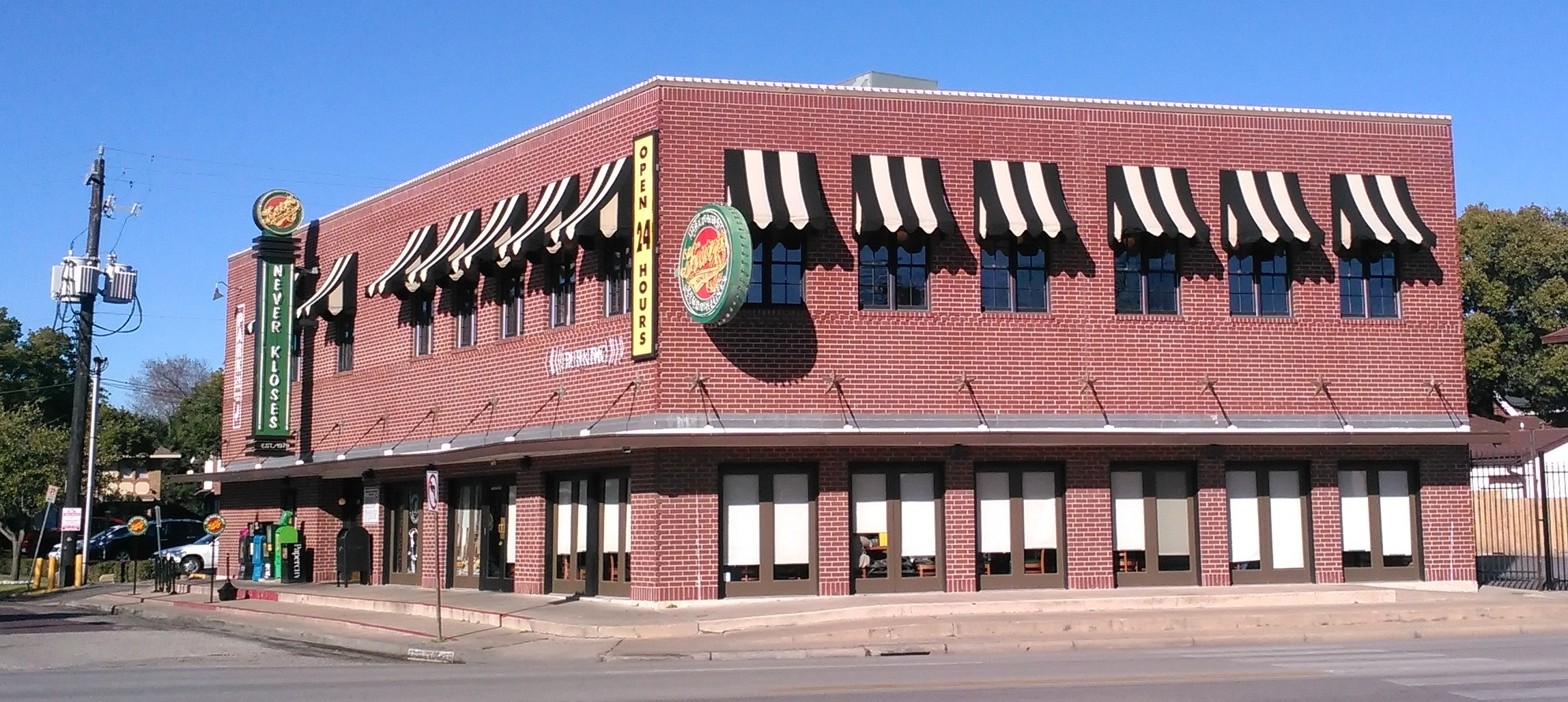
- Restaurant's exterior, 2016

Restaurant information
- Established: 1998
- Location: Houston, Texas, U.S.

Katz's Deli is a Jewish deli and restaurant with multiple locations in Houston, in the U.S. state of Texas.

== History ==
The original restaurant opened along Westheimer in 1998. A second location opened in The Woodlands in 2007. A third location opened in the Heights in 2020.

== See also ==
- List of Ashkenazi Jewish restaurants
- History of the Jews in Houston
