= Ben & Esther's Vegan Jewish Deli =

American chain of Jewish delis

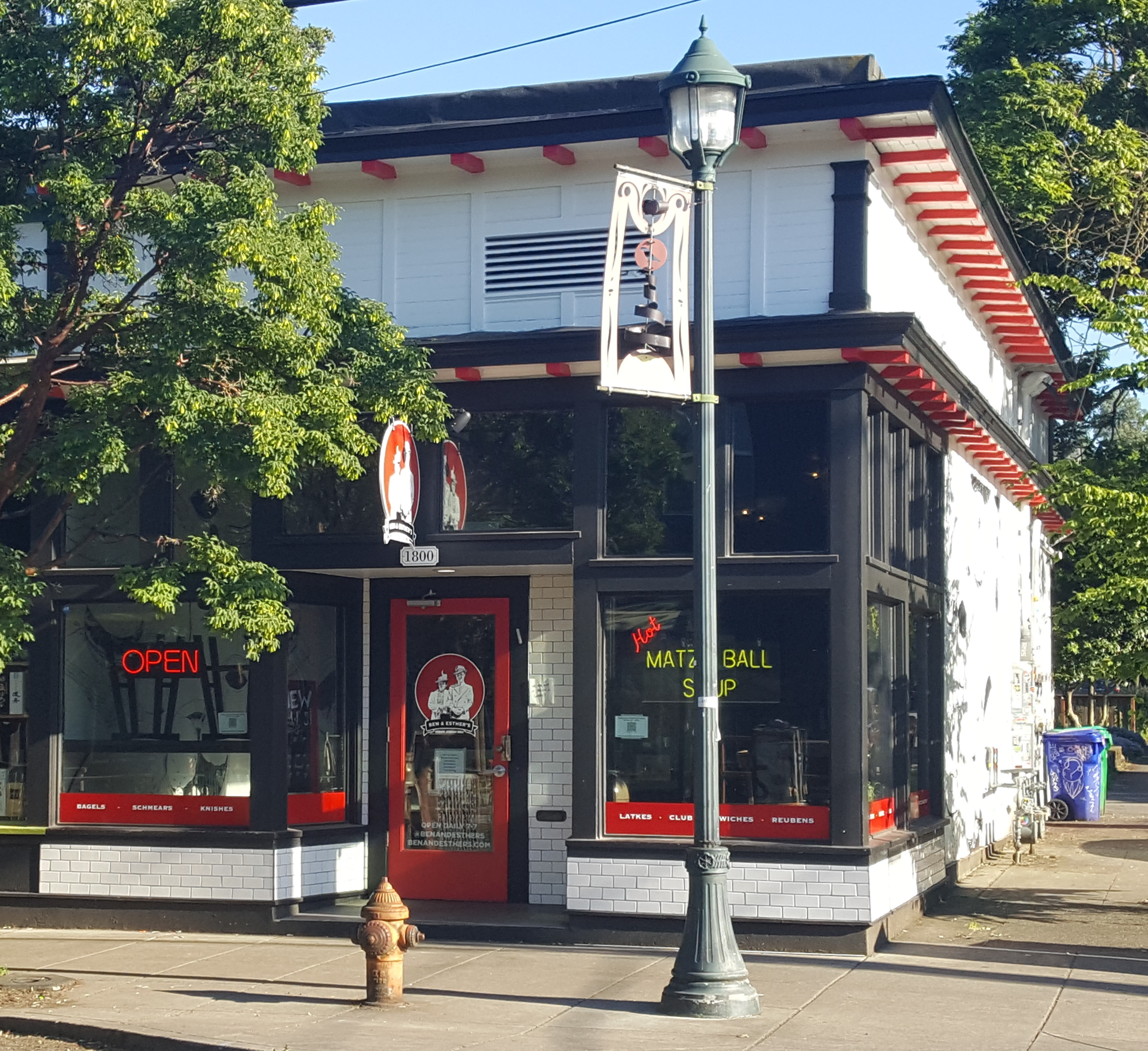
- Exterior of the restaurant on Northeast Alberta in Portland, Oregon, 2022

Restaurant information
- Established: 2019
- Owner: Justin King
- Location: United States
- Website: benandesthers.com

Ben & Esther's Vegan Jewish Deli, or simply Ben & Esther's, is a small chain of vegan Jewish delis in the United States. Founded in Portland, Oregon, in 2019, the business has also operated in California and Washington.

== History ==
=== Oregon ===
Founder and owner Justin King opened the original restaurant on Sandy Boulevard in northeast Portland's Roseway neighborhood in 2019.

A second location opened on Northeast Alberta in the Vernon neighborhood. In 2022, the shop was vandalized by someone who spray-painted a swastika on a sign.

=== California ===
Locations have operated in San Diego and Oceanside.

=== Washington ===
An outpost operated on Seattle's Capitol Hill. The location closed at the end of 2023.

== Reception ==
Ben & Esther's won in the Best Vegan Deli and Best Vegan Portland Restaurant categories of VegNews's 2023 restaurant awards and overview of the nation's 28 best vegan eateries. The business ranked second in the Best Vegan Butcher Shop & Deli and Best Vegan Deli categories in 2024 and 2026, respectively. Ben & Esther's was a runner-up in the Best Deli category of Willamette Week's annual 'Best of Portland' readers' poll in 2024. The business ranked second and was a finalist in the same category in 2025 and 2026, respectively.

== See also ==
- History of the Jews in Oregon
- History of the Jews in San Diego
- List of Ashkenazi Jewish restaurants
- List of Jewish delis
- List of restaurant chains in the United States
- List of vegetarian and vegan restaurants
