= Dingfelder's Delicatessen =

Restaurant in Seattle, Washington, U.S.

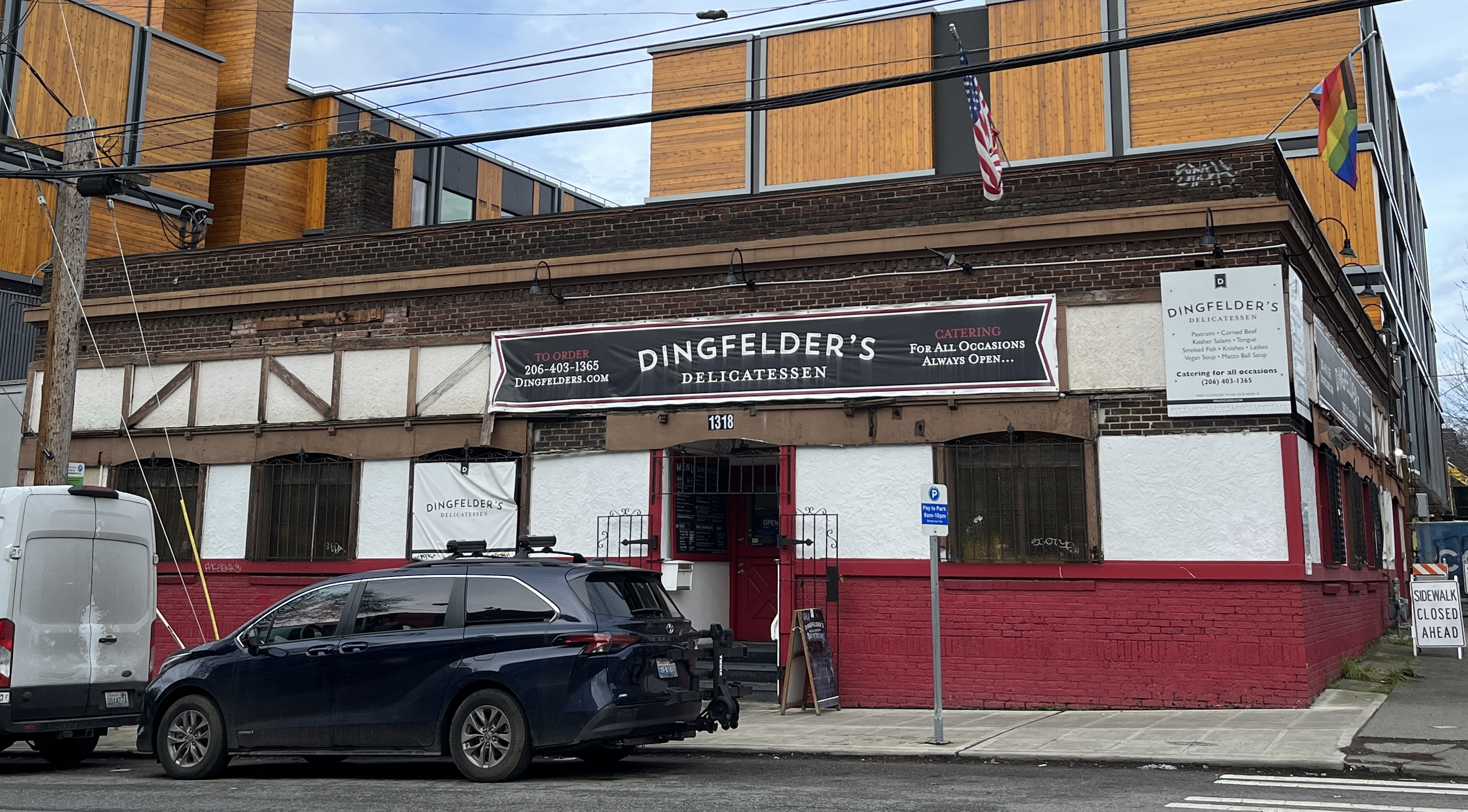
- The restaurant's exterior, 2024
- Interactive map of Dingfelder's Delicatessen

Restaurant information
- Established: 2018
- Owner: Vance Dingfelder
- Location: Seattle, Washington, United States
- Coordinates: 47.6154°N 122.3144°W

Dingfelder's Delicatessen is a restaurant in Seattle's Capitol Hill neighborhood, in the U.S. state of Washington.

== Description ==
The Jewish deli Dingfelder's operates in a brick building in Seattle's Capitol Hill neighborhood. The menu has included bagels and corned beef and pastrami sandwiches.

For Hanukkah, the business has served latkes. For Passover, the delicatessen has served brisket, brisket gravy, whole roasted kosher lemon chicken, chicken soup, potato kugels, and smoked salmon, with mushroom barley, split pea, and cabbage soup as vegan options. The deli has also had a special menu for Rosh Hashanah.

== History ==
Dingfelder's began operating in 2018. Owners have included Vance Dingfelder and Stephanie Hemsworth.

== See also ==
- List of Ashkenazi Jewish restaurants
- List of Jewish delis
