= Loeb's NY Deli =

Kosher-style deli in Washington, D.C., United States

Coordinates: 38°54′4.2″N 77°2′24.8″W

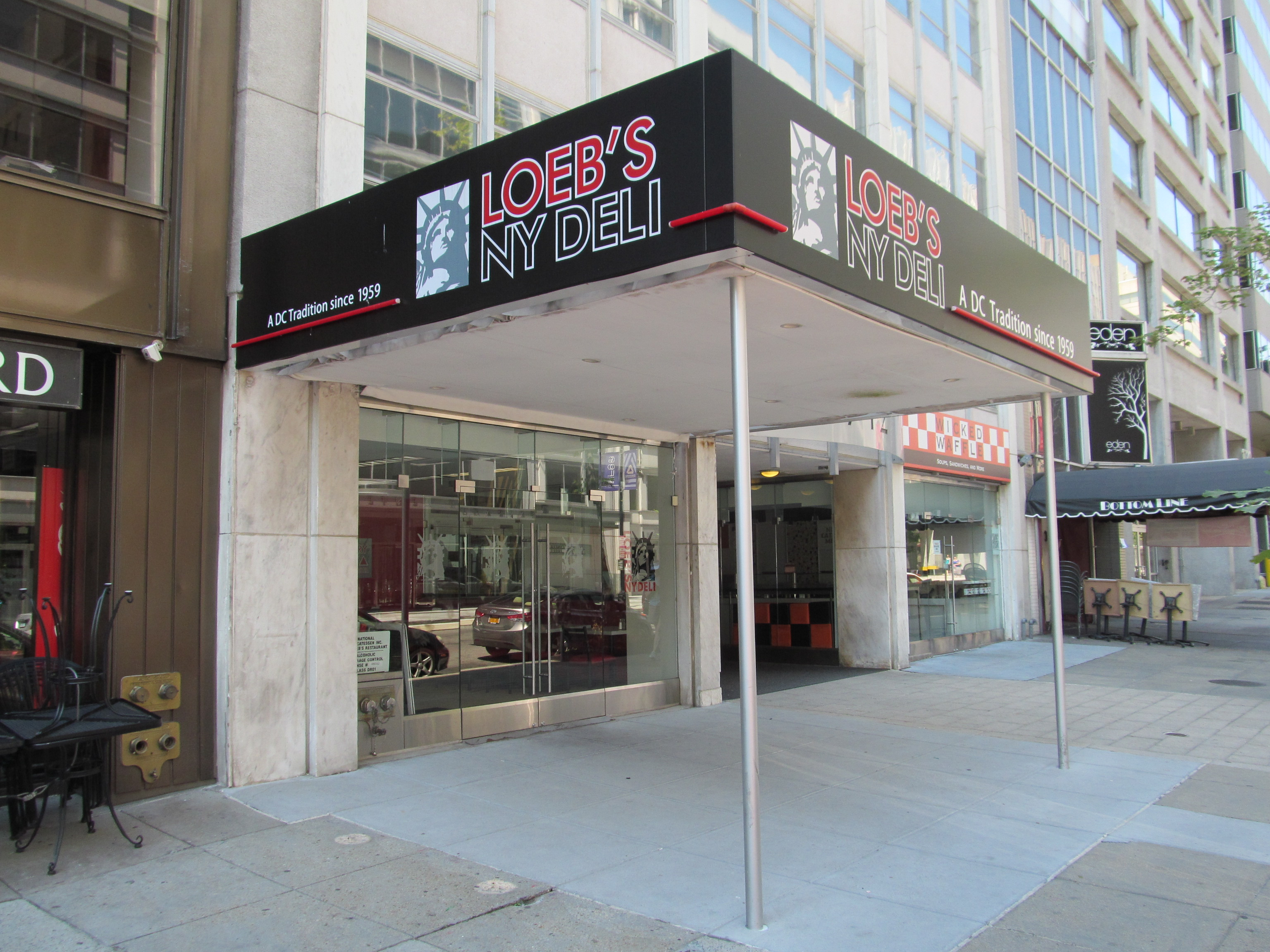
Loeb's NY Deli

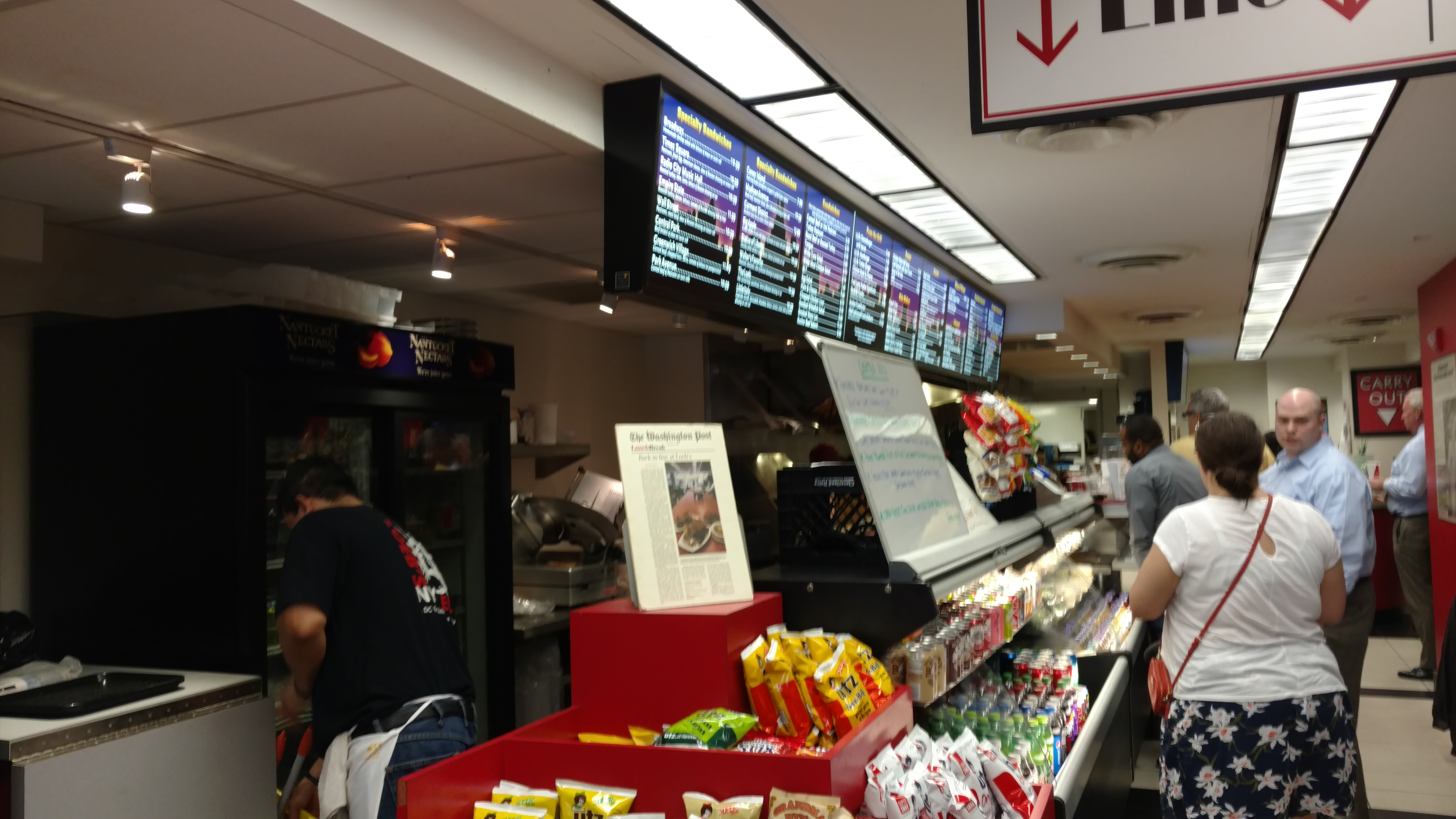
The menu board and counter in the deli

Loeb's NY Deli is a historic kosher-style deli in downtown Washington, D.C., United States. Opened in 1959 by Walter Loeb, the deli was originally located at the corner of 15th and G Streets, NW, in a space currently occupied by the Old Ebbitt Grill. In the 1970s the deli moved to the U.S. Export-Import Bank (Lafayette) building, and was made to move again in 2010 because of a Recovery Act-funded renovation. It is now located at 1712 I Street, and run by Dave, Marlene and Steve Loeb, the children of founder Walter Loeb.

== See also ==
- List of Ashkenazi Jewish restaurants
- List of delicatessens
