= S&S Cheesecake =

American kosher cheesecake producer

Coordinates: 40.884721°N 73.899807°W

S&S Cheesecake is a kosher cheesecake producer in Bronx, New York founded by Holocaust survivor Fred Schuster and now co-run by his Israeli son-in-law Yair Ben-Zaken. S&S was opened 1960. They provided the cheesecake for the steakhouse The Palm, as well as supplying Peter Luger Steakhouse and Zabar's. Their motto is "doing one thing well".

== See also ==
- List of Ashkenazi Jewish restaurants
