= Sammy's Roumanian Steakhouse =

Romanian-Jewish restaurant

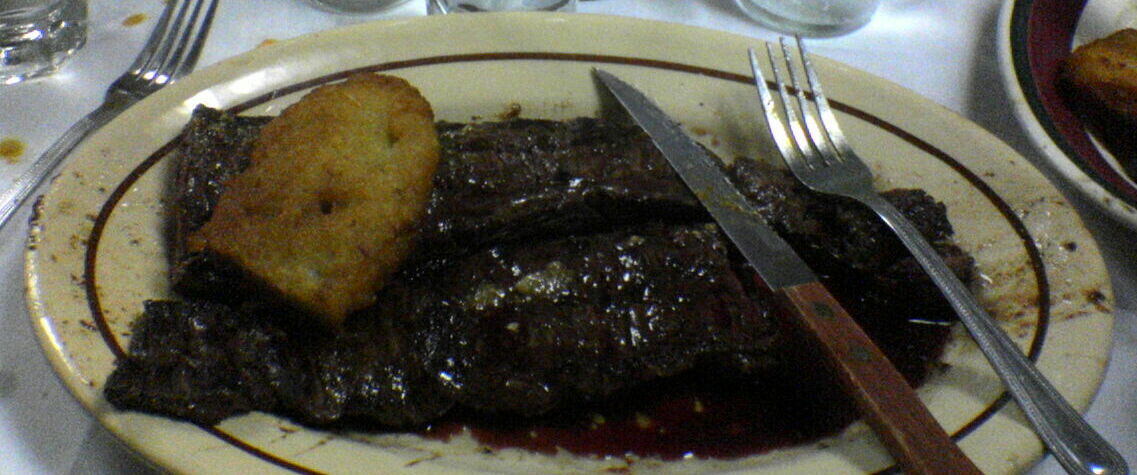
steak (Daniel Napierski, 2007)

Dave Winer, 2010

Sammy's Roumanian Steakhouse is a Romanian-Jewish restaurant on Lower East Side of Manhattan. It closed in 2021 due to the COVID-19 pandemic in New York City and reopened in a new location nearby in Spring 2024. The original Sammy's was considered a New York foodie institution. Sammy's opened in 1975, in a location occupied previously by another Romanian restaurant on Chrystie Street.

Sammy's occupied a basement retail space on the Lower East Side for 47 years where it served Romanian-style steak and offered entertainment by lounge performer Dani Luv, who also does Borscht Belt-style stand-up comedy replete with Yiddish. The entertainer, whose legal name is Dani Lubnitski, has returned to the keyboard at the restaurant, which is also known for its vodka-fueled nightlife scene (with bottles served frozen in blocks of ice) and garlicky beef.

Sammy's is known for fried kreplach, chopped liver, sweetbreads, latkes, ice block-encased vodka bottle service, and syrup jars filled with schmaltz or rendered chicken fat, at the tables as a condiment. The owner is David Zimmerman. Chris Frantz refers to the original Sammy's as a restaurant frequented by music business executives during Talking Heads' time in the CBGB scene.

(Dave Winer, 2010)

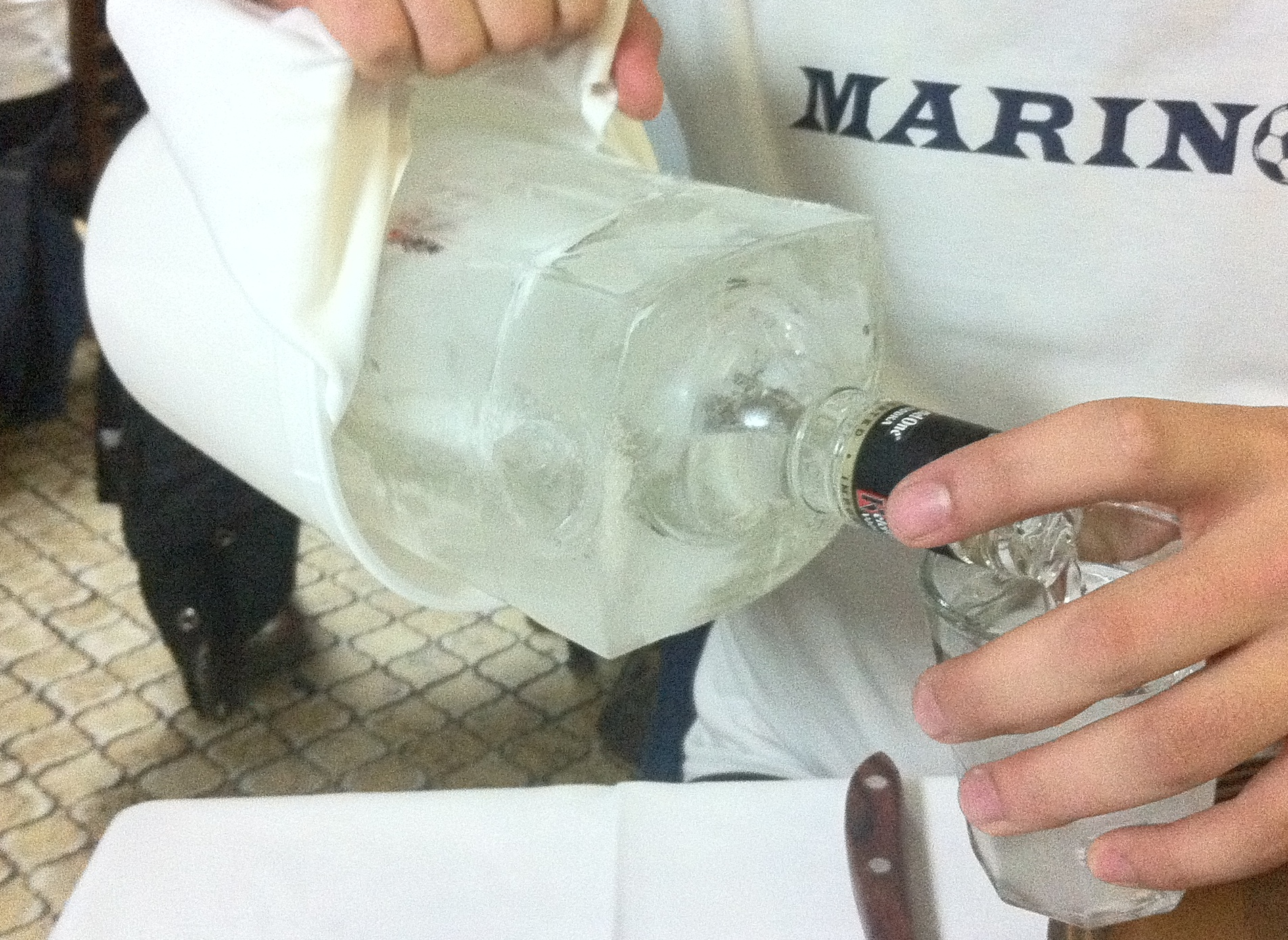
Vodka

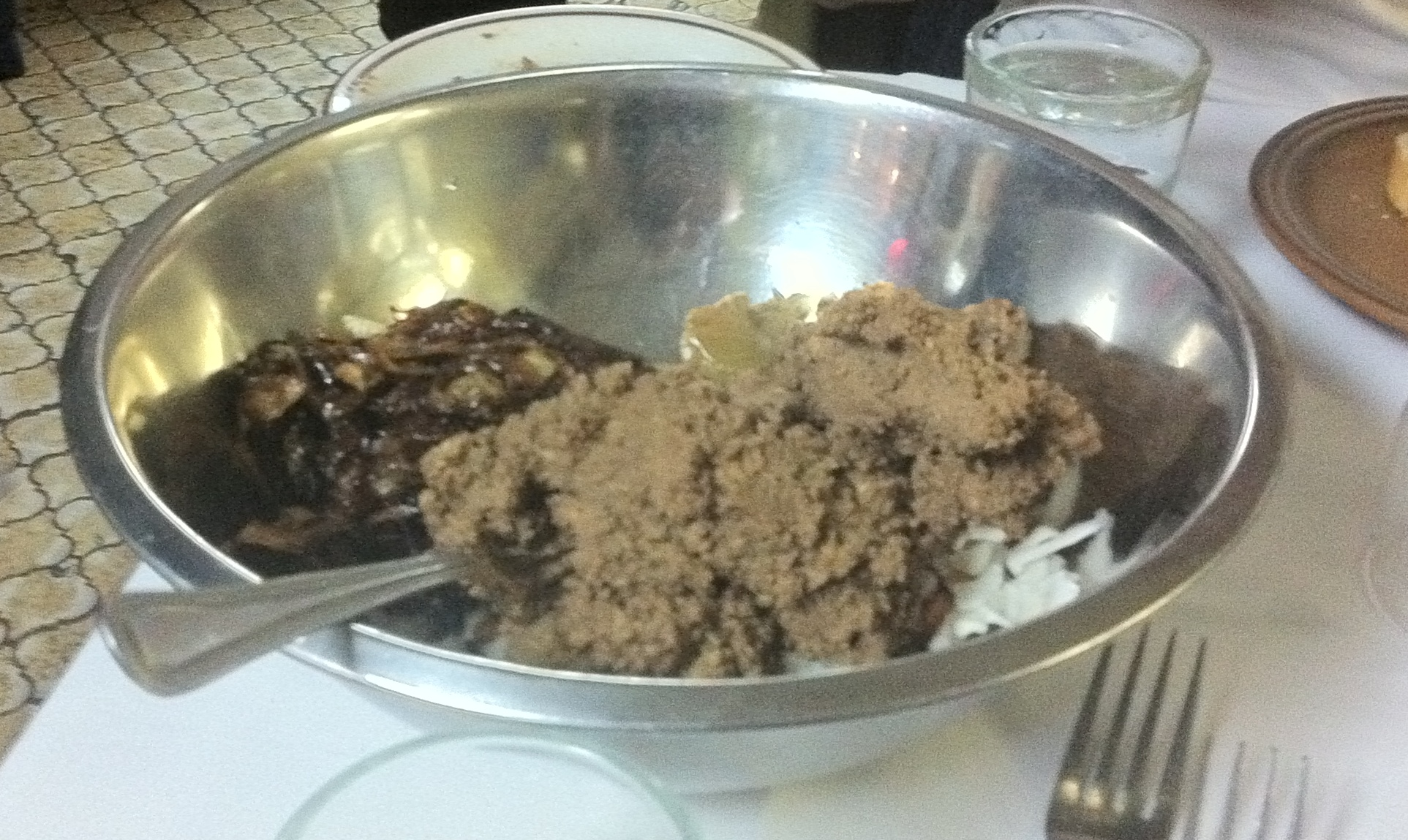
Chopped liver

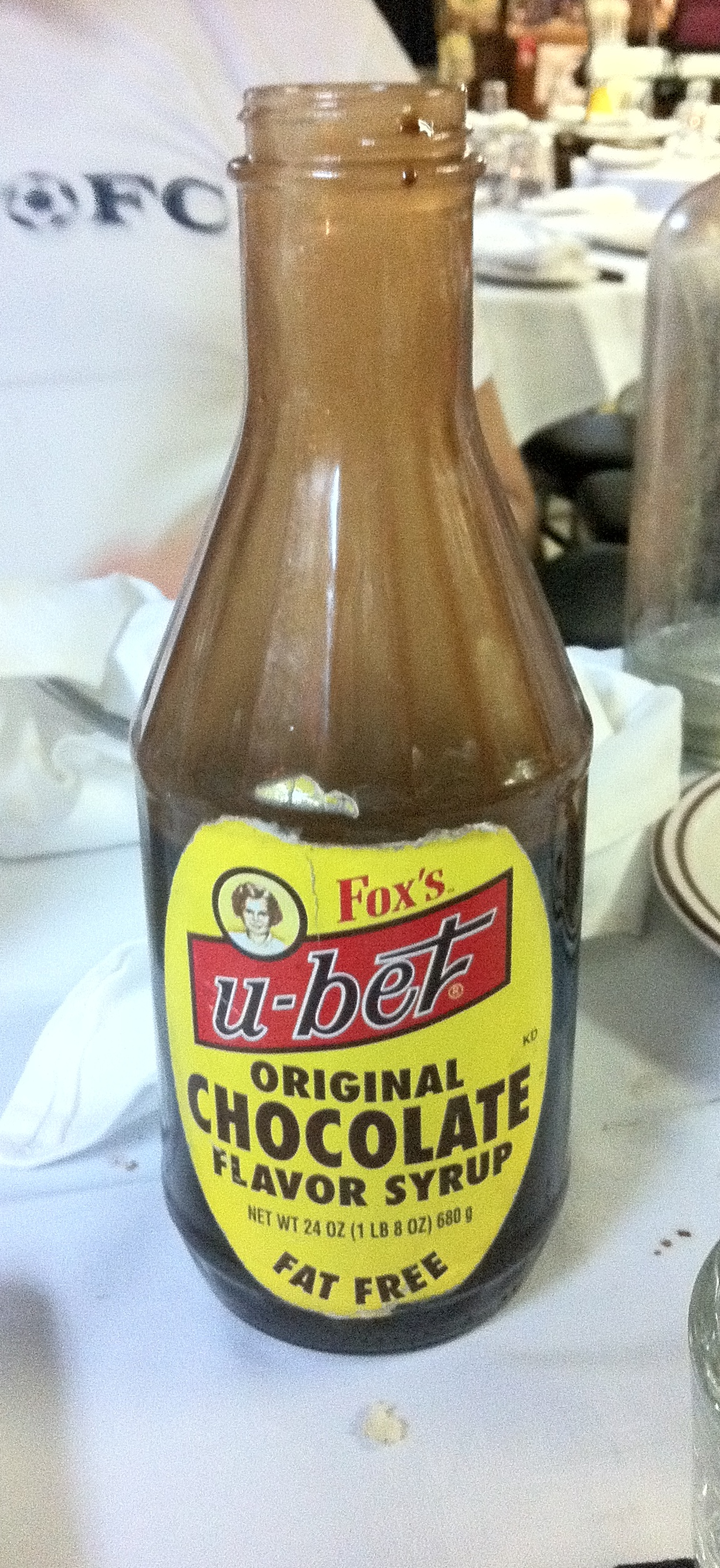
Fox's U-bet chocolate syrup

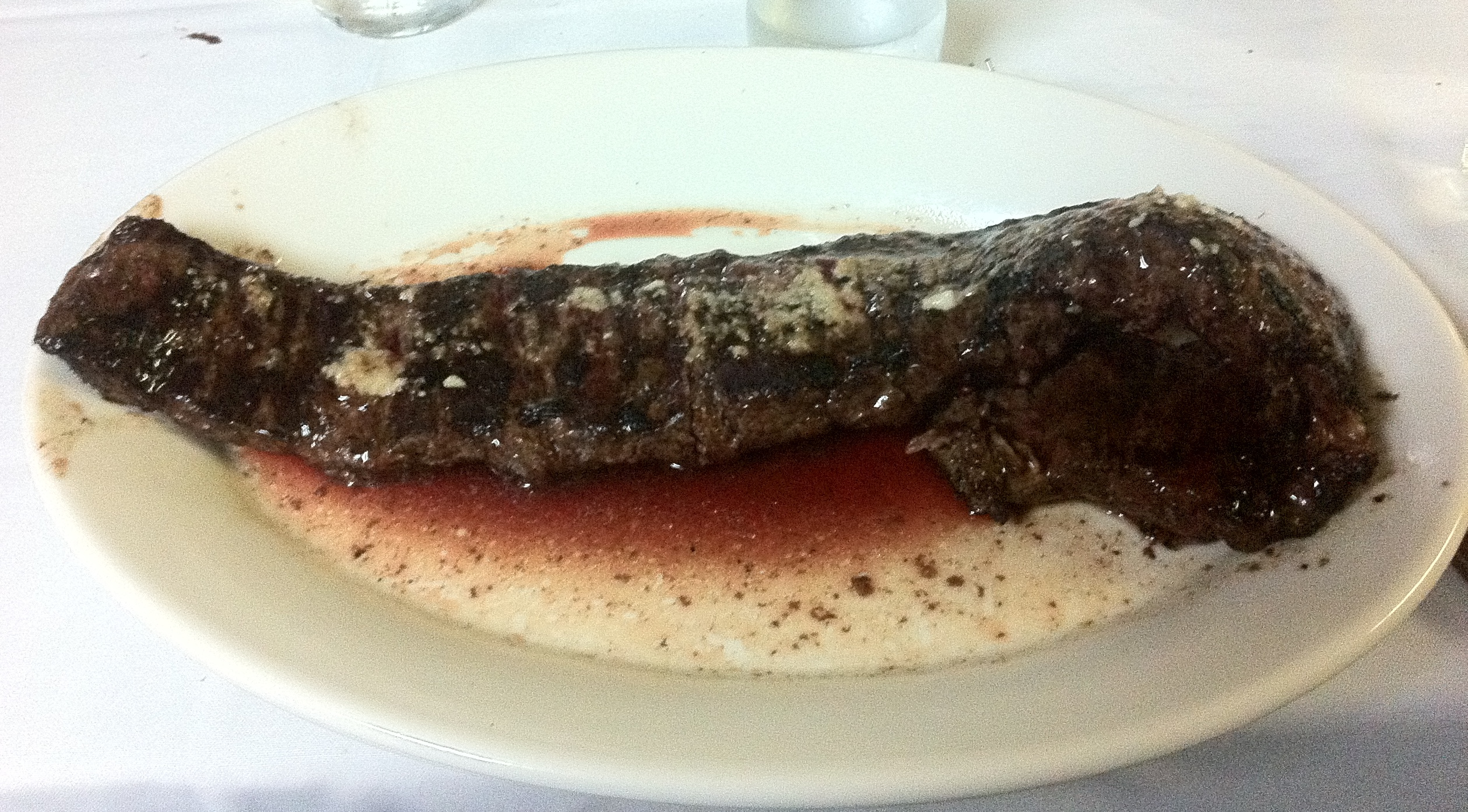
Romanian-style garlic steak

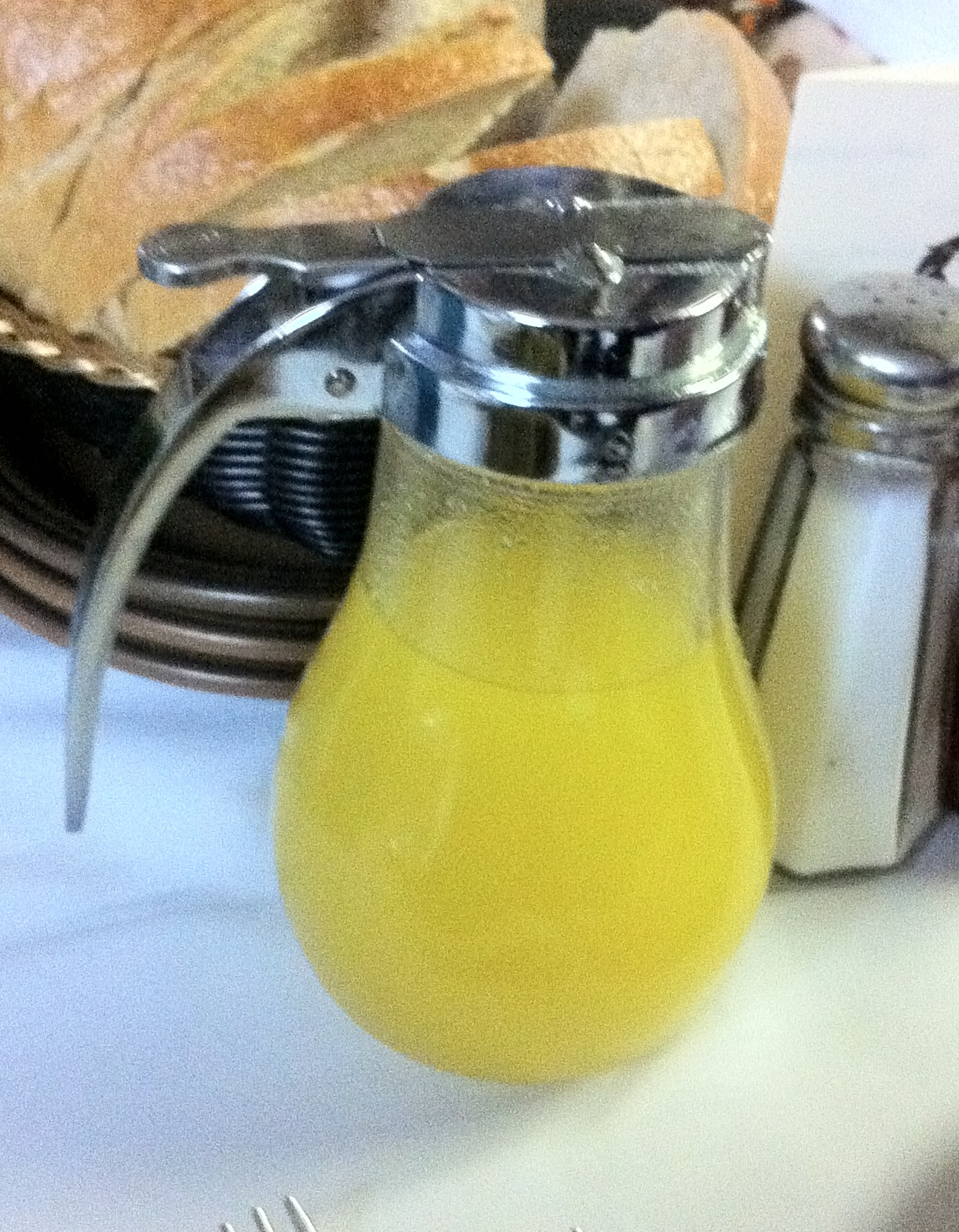
Schmaltz

== See also ==
- List of Ashkenazi Jewish restaurants
