= Attman's Delicatessen =

Jewish deli in Maryland

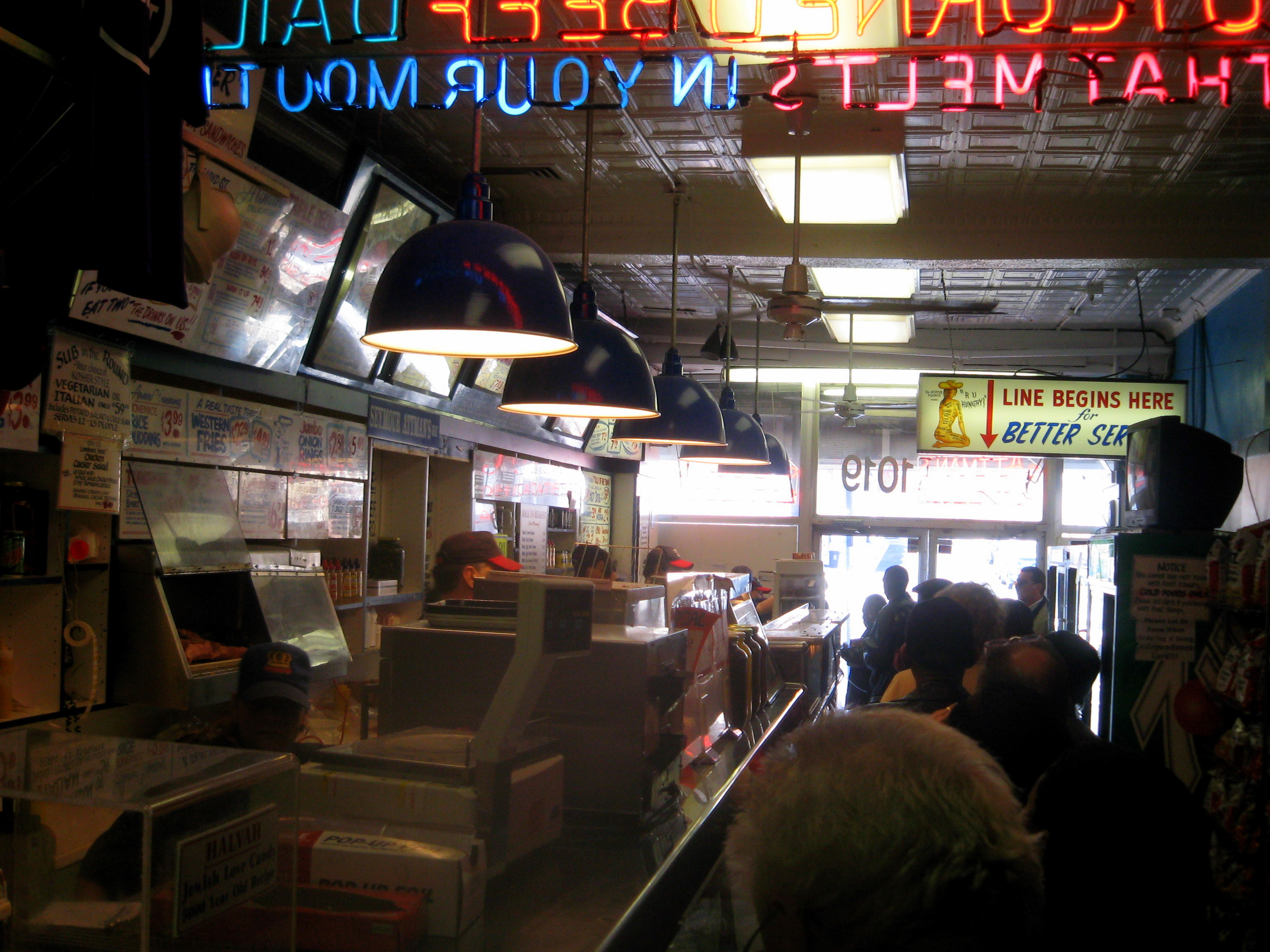

Restaurant information
- Food type: Ashkenazi Jewish American cuisine
- Location: Baltimore and Potomac, Maryland
- Website: attmansdeli.com

Attman's Delicatessen is a Jewish delicatessen in Maryland with branches in Baltimore and Potomac. The deli serves Ashkenazi staples including corned beef, pastrami, brisket, Reuben sandwiches, knishes, latkes, pickles, kugel, and whitefish salad.

== History ==
Attman's Delicatessen was first opened on Lombard Street in East Baltimore in 1915. Lombard Street was known as Corned Beef Row, once the heart of Jewish Baltimore and known for its many Jewish delis. The founder of the deli, Harry Attman, was a Jewish immigrant from a village near Kyiv, who settled in Baltimore in 1920 after learning the grocery trade in Providence, Rhode Island. His wife Ida was from Poland. The Attmans were religious and kept a kosher kitchen at home, but the corned beef and beef tongue came from non-kosher meat and the deli was never kosher. The deli was open during Shabbat, even during World War II when local rabbis tried to enforce Shabbat observance. Harry died in 1968 and his son Seymour took over the family business. By the 1970s, the clientele at Attman's Delicatessen had become predominantly non-Jewish.

The Montgomery County location was originally located in Cabin John in 2013, but relocated to Potomac in 2020.

== See also ==
- List of Ashkenazi Jewish restaurants
