= List of Ashkenazi Jewish restaurants =

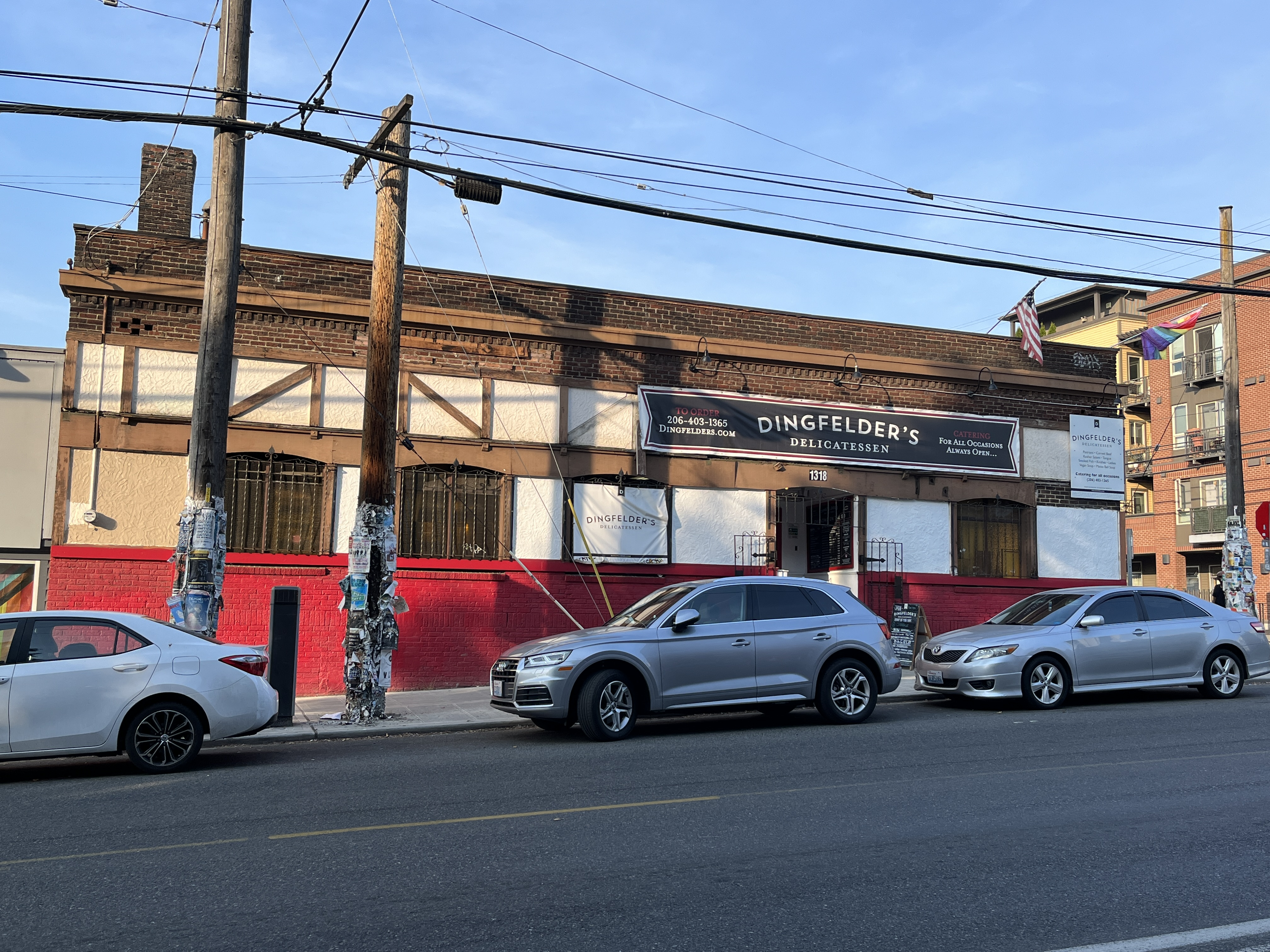
Dingfelder's Delicatessen, Seattle

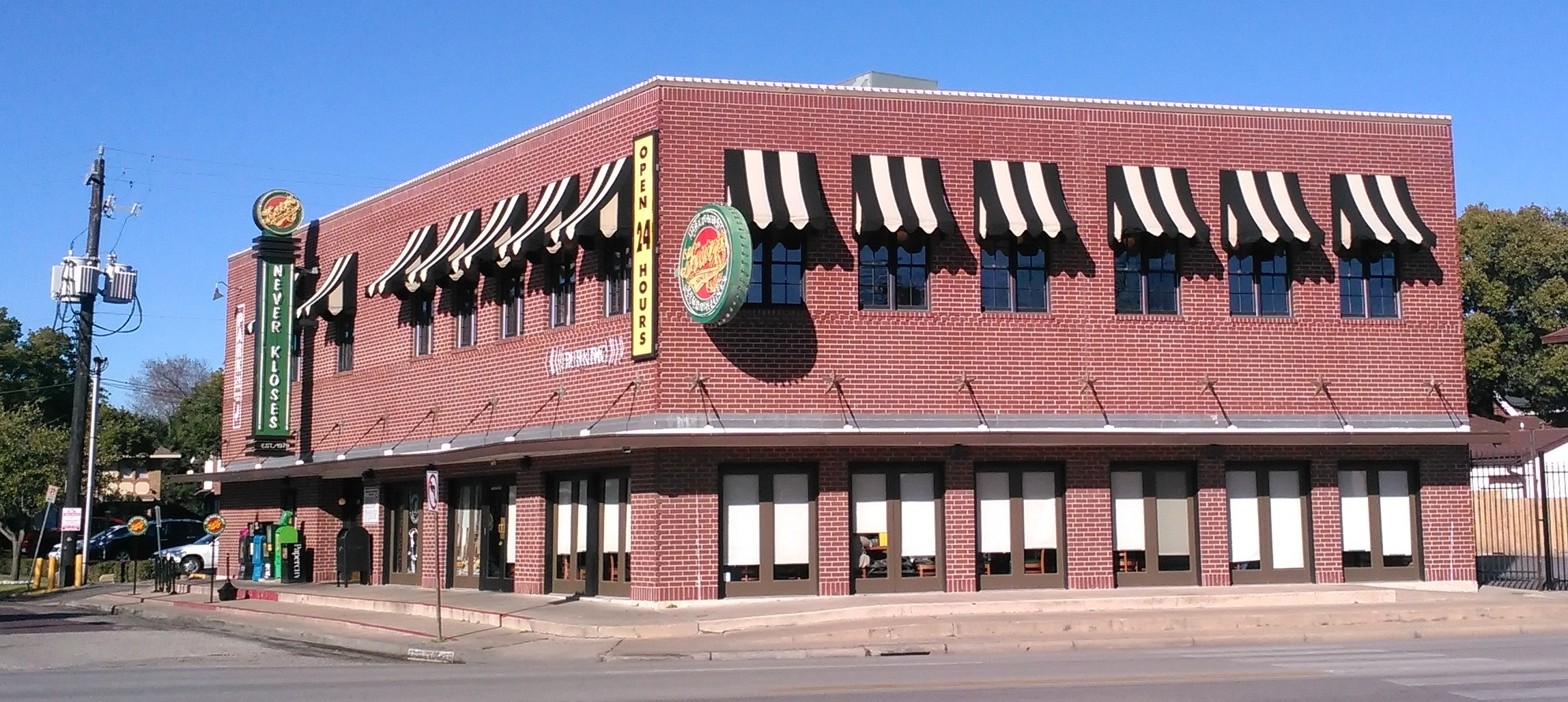
Katz's Deli, Houston, Texas

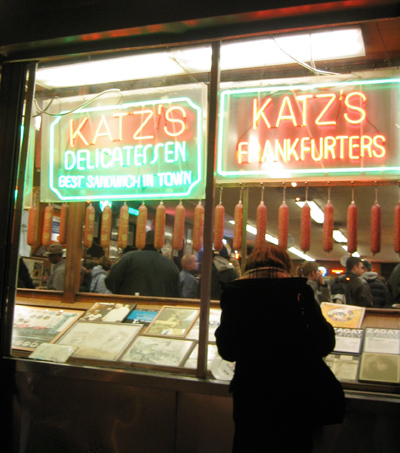
Katz's Delicatessen, New York City

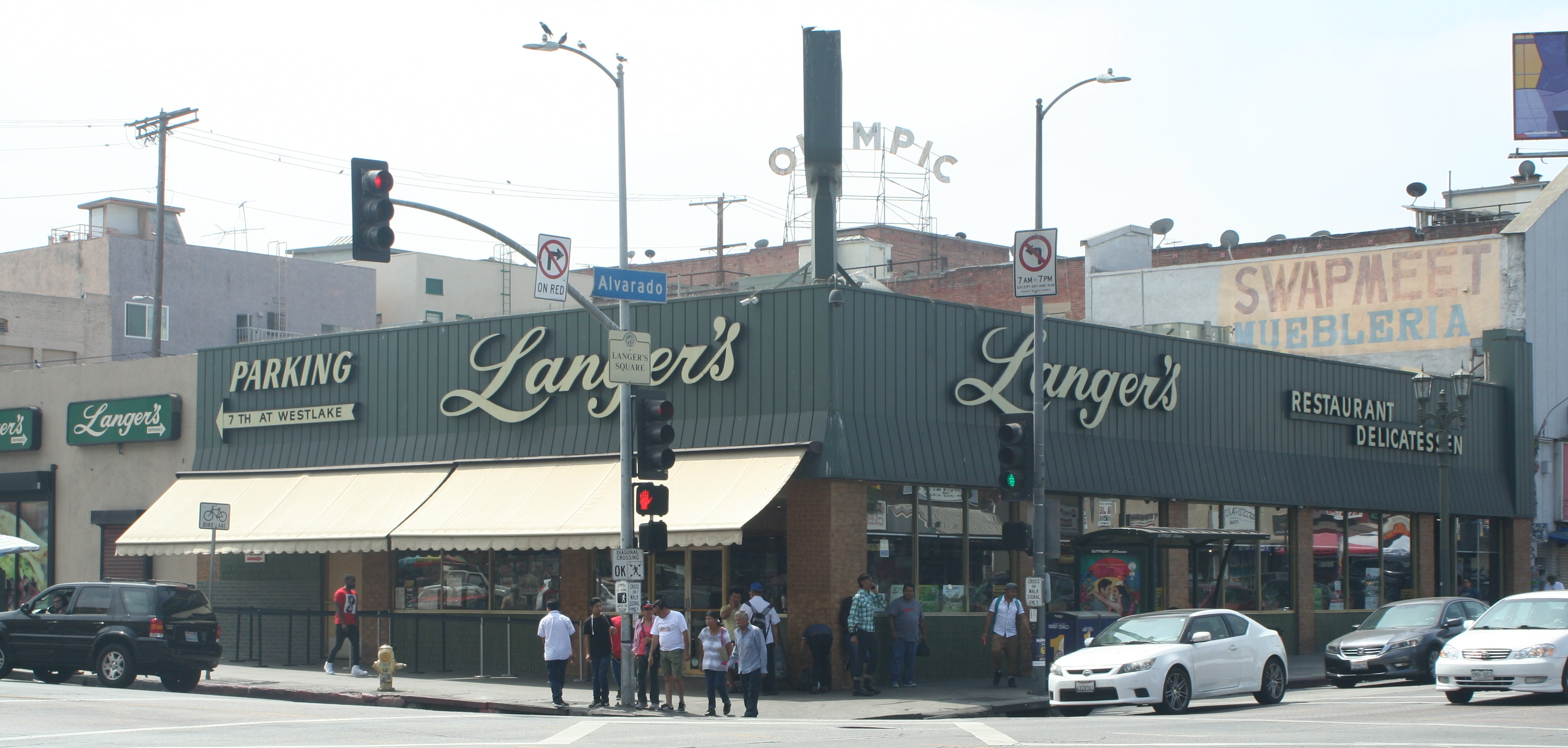
Langer's Deli, Los Angeles, California

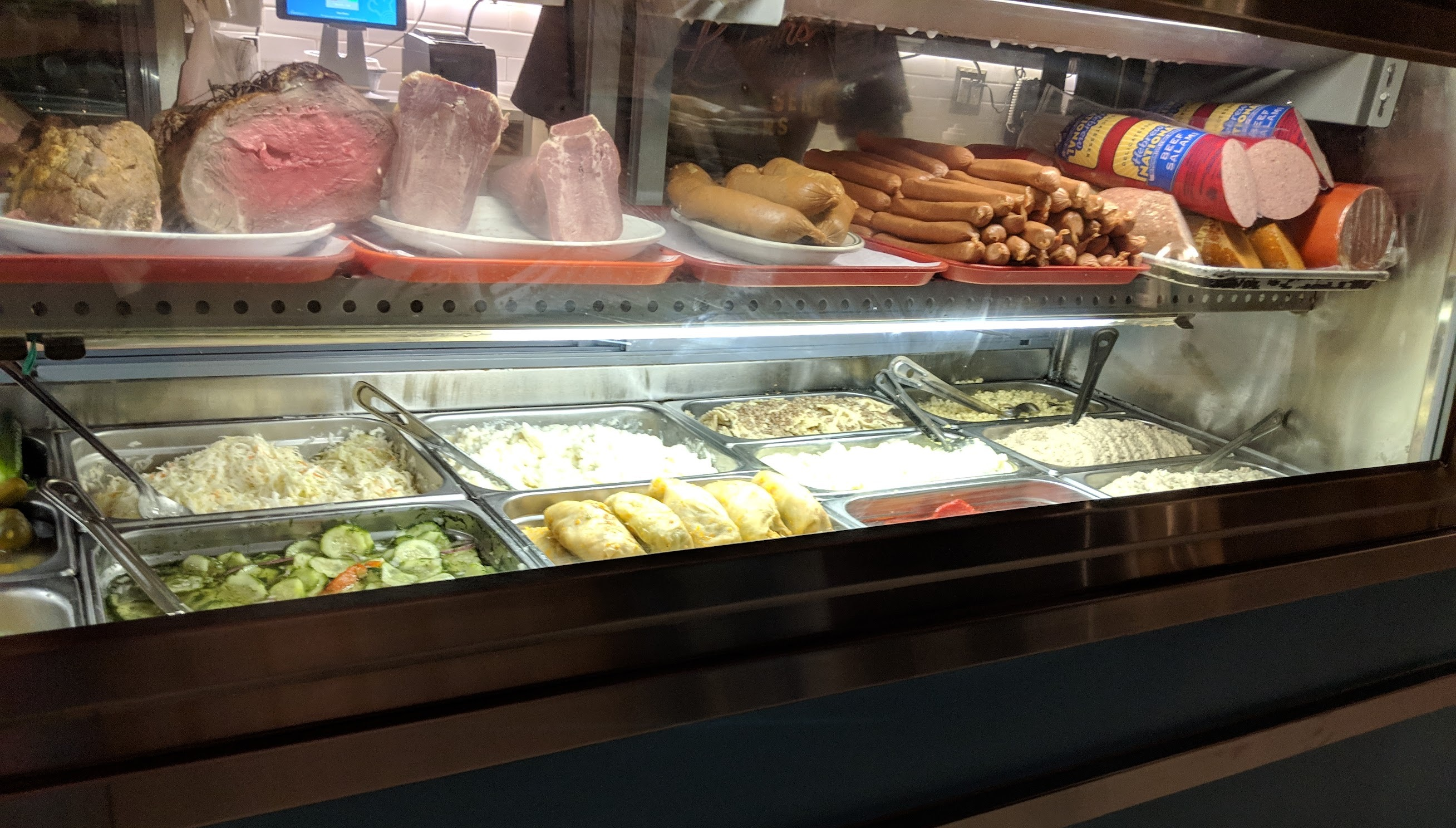
Liebman's Deli, New York City

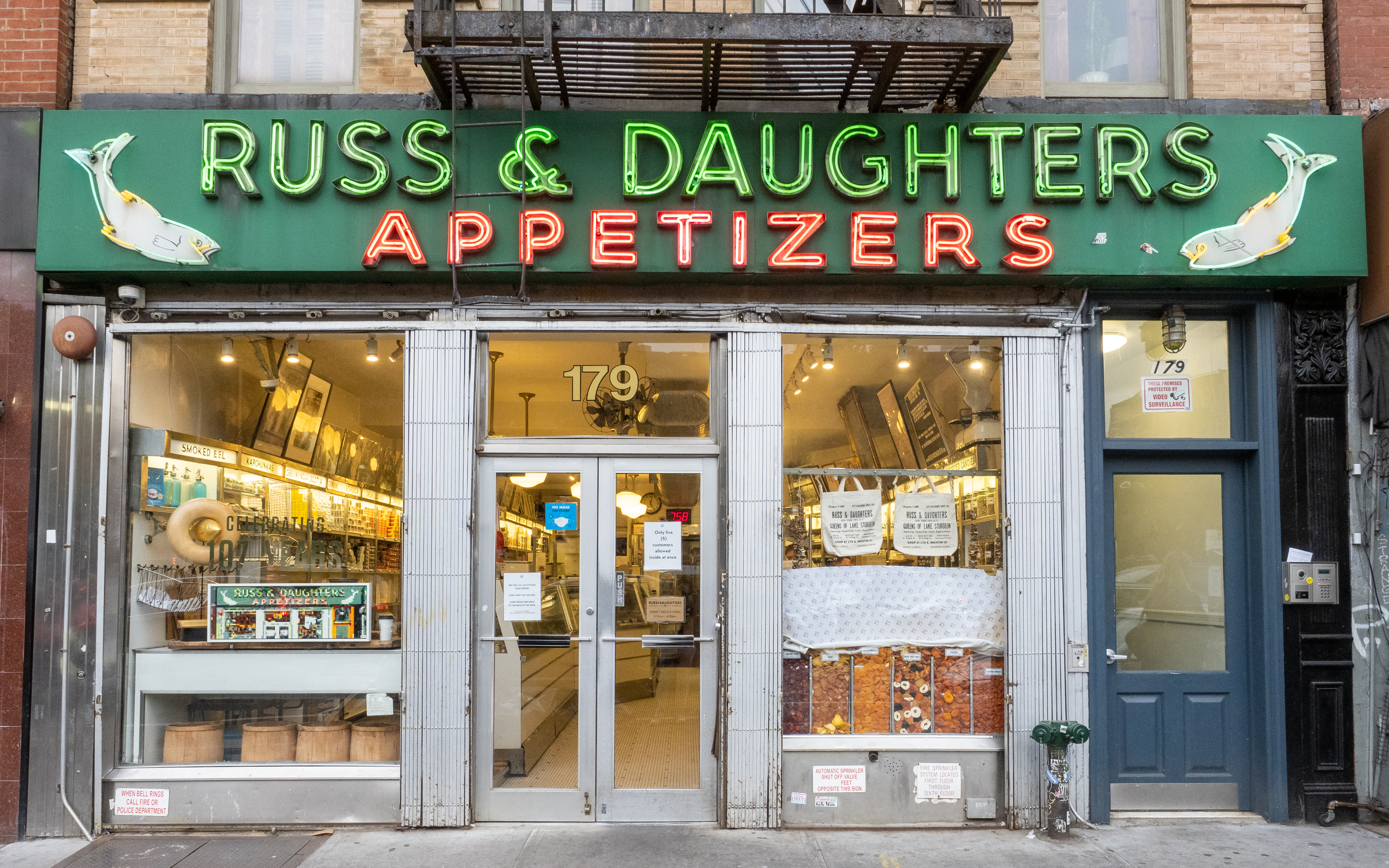
Russ & Daughters, New York City

Following is a list of Ashkenazi Jewish restaurants, including some kosher restaurants:

- Attman's Delicatessen, Maryland
- Barney Greengrass, New York City
- Ben & Esther's Vegan Jewish Deli, Oregon; California; Washington
- Ben's Kosher Deli, New York City; Florida; Long Island
- B&H Dairy, New York City
- Brent's Deli, Los Angeles, California
- Call Your Mother, Washington D.C.; Colorado
- Canter's, Los Angeles
- Caplansky's Delicatessen, Toronto, Canada
- Carnegie Deli, New York City
- Chenoy's, Montreal
- Davidovich Bagels, New York City
- Dingfelder's Delicatessen, Seattle
- D.Z. Akin's, San Diego
- Fairmount Bagel, Montreal
- Guss' Pickles, New York City
- Junior's, New York City
- J&R Kosher Meat and Delicatessen, Montreal
- Katz's Deli, Houston
- Katz's Delicatessen, New York City
- Kaufman's Deli, Chicago
- Kossar's Bialys, New York City
- Langer's Deli, Los Angeles
- Liebman's Deli, New York City
- Loeb's NY Deli, Washington, D.C.
- Manny's Deli, Chicago
- Mile End Delicatessen, New York City
- Moishes Steakhouse, Montreal
- Nate 'n Al of Beverly Hills
- Nathan's Famous
- Pastrami Queen, New York City
- Russ & Daughters, New York City
- Rubinstein Bagels, Seattle
- Schwartz's Deli, Montreal
- Sammy's Roumanian Steakhouse, New York City
- Sarge's Deli, New York City
- Second Avenue Deli, New York City
- Shopsy's, Toronto
- S&S Cheesecake, New York City
- Wilensky's, Montreal
- Yonah Schimmel's Knish Bakery, New York City
- Zabar's, New York City
- Zaro's Bakery, New York City
- Zingerman's, Michigan
- Zylberschtein's, Seattle

== Defunct restaurants ==
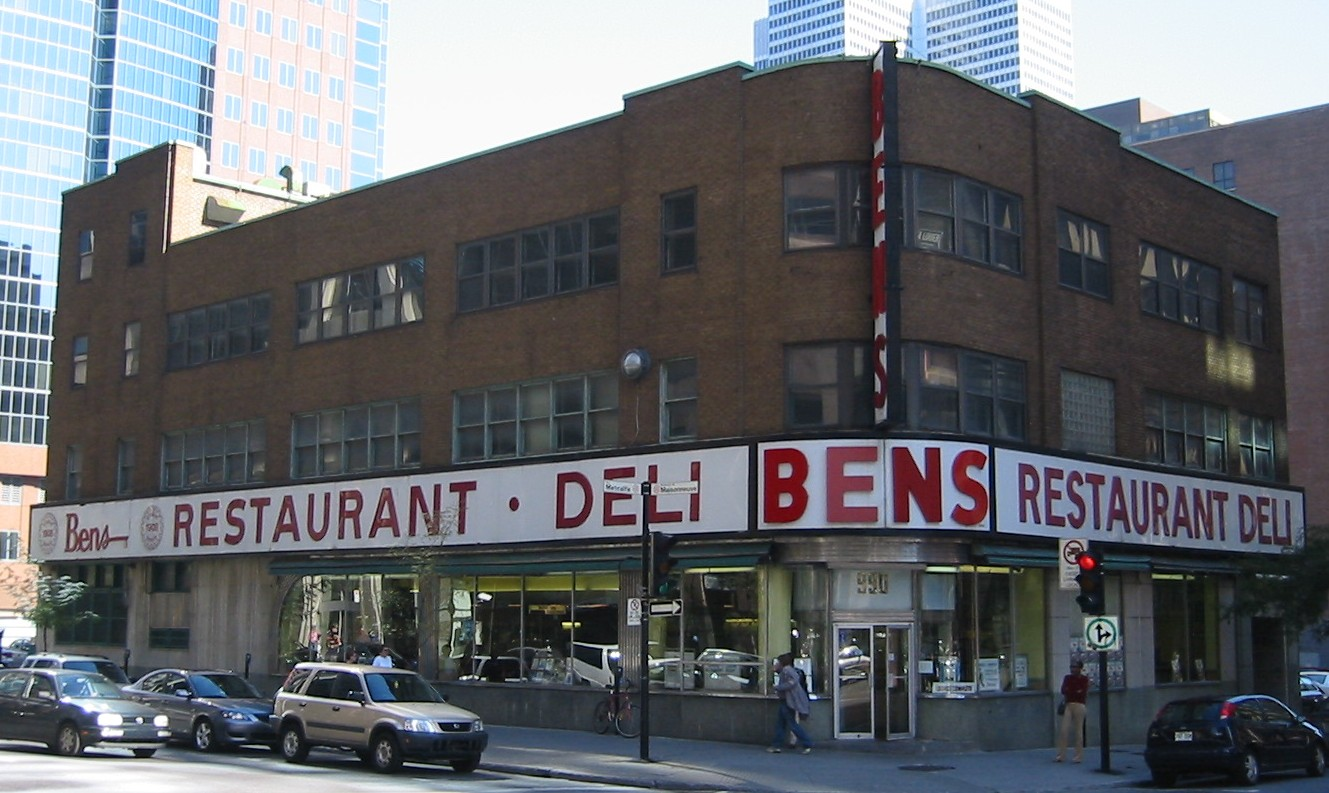
Bens De Luxe Delicatessen & Restaurant, Montreal

- Bens De Luxe Delicatessen & Restaurant, Montreal
- Gaby's Deli
- Greenblatt's Deli & Fine Wines, West Hollywood, California
- Jerry's Famous Deli
- Kenny & Zuke's Delicatessen, Portland, Oregon
- Kornblatt's Delicatessen, Portland, Oregon
- Henry S. Levy and Sons, New York City
- Loeser's Deli, New York City
- Lindy's, New York City
- Mort's Palisades Deli
- Ratner's, New York City
- Reuben's Restaurant, New York City
- Stage Deli, New York City
- Sweet Lorraine's, Portland, Oregon
- Wolfie Cohen's Rascal House, Florida
