= Guss' Pickles =

Coordinates: 40.71796°N 73.99041°W

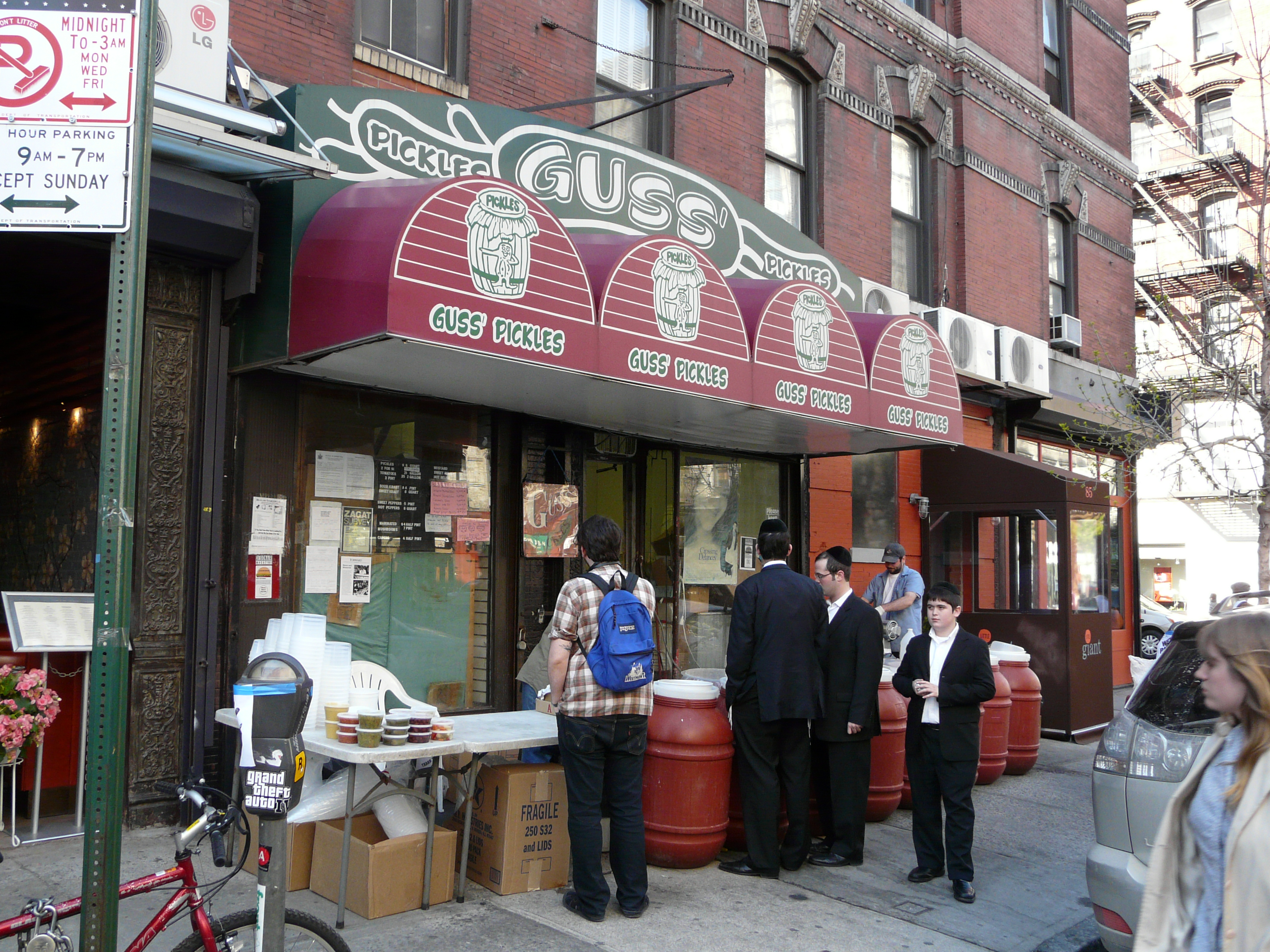
- Guss' Pickles, 87 Orchard St, Manhattan. 2008
- Interactive map of Guss' Pickles

Restaurant information
- Location: New York City, New York, United States

Guss' Pickles was founded by a Polish immigrant, Isidor Guss. Guss arrived in New York in 1910, and like hundreds of thousands of other Jewish immigrants, settled on the Lower East Side of Manhattan. Clustered in the "pickle district" of Essex and Ludlow streets, early 20th century pickle vendors gave birth to what would be known as "New York style" pickles.

Guss at first worked for L. Hollander and Sons, before opening his own store. At the time, the neighborhood was teeming with 80 other pickle shops. However, immigration restrictions, a ban on pushcarts and the steady economic decline of the Lower East Side felled almost all of these shops.

Guss' Pickles withstood the economic difficulty and now remains as the last store from the days of the Essex Street empire. In 1979, Harry Baker and his partner Burt Blitz took over Guss' Pickles. Through the 1980s and into the 2000s, Baker and his son Tim ran the store. .

Guss' Pickles were featured in the film Crossing Delancey. Guss' Pickles ships gallon size nationwide at their official web-site GussPickles.com. In June 2017, Guss' Pickles opened a new store in Brooklyn inside the Dekalb Market Hall.

== Ownership ==
In 2002, Tim Baker sold his ownership of Guss' Pickles to Andrew Leibowitz. The Guss' Pickles trademark now belongs to Crossing Delancey Pickle Enterprises Corporation. Andrew Leibowitz is the president. They maintain a factory in the Bronx and a farm in New Jersey.

== See also ==
- List of Ashkenazi Jewish restaurants
