= Zaro's Bakery =

American family-owned bakery

Zaro's Family Bakery
- Founded: 1927
- Number of locations: 14
- Area served: New York City area
- Products: Baked goods

Zaro's Family Bakery is an American family-owned bakery, operating in the New York City metropolitan area.

== History ==
The bakery was founded in The Bronx in 1927, by Joseph Zarubchik, a Polish-Jewish immigrant, and is now operated by his grandsons, Stuart and Joseph.

In 1977, the company opened its first of three stores in Grand Central Terminal, followed by stores in Pennsylvania Station and the Port Authority Bus Terminal – all in the Manhattan borough of New York City.

It manufactures all of its own products. Supreme Court Justice Sonia Sotomayor worked at Zaro's Bakery as a teenager.

== Store locations ==
- Parkchester, Bronx, NY (since 1959)
- Grand Central Terminal, New York, NY (since 1977)
- New York Penn Station, New York, NY
- Newark Penn Station, Newark, NJ
- Newark Liberty International Airport (Terminals A & B), Newark, NJ
- 501 Seventh Avenue, New York, NY
- LaGuardia Airport (Terminal B), New York, NY
- Port Authority Bus Terminal, New York, NY
- 1825 Park Avenue, Harlem, NY
- Macy's Herald Square, New York, NY

== See also ==
- List of Ashkenazi Jewish restaurants
- List of bakeries
