= Kenny & Zuke's Delicatessen =

Defunct delicatessen in Portland, Oregon, U.S.

Coordinates: 45.522301°N 122.682333°W

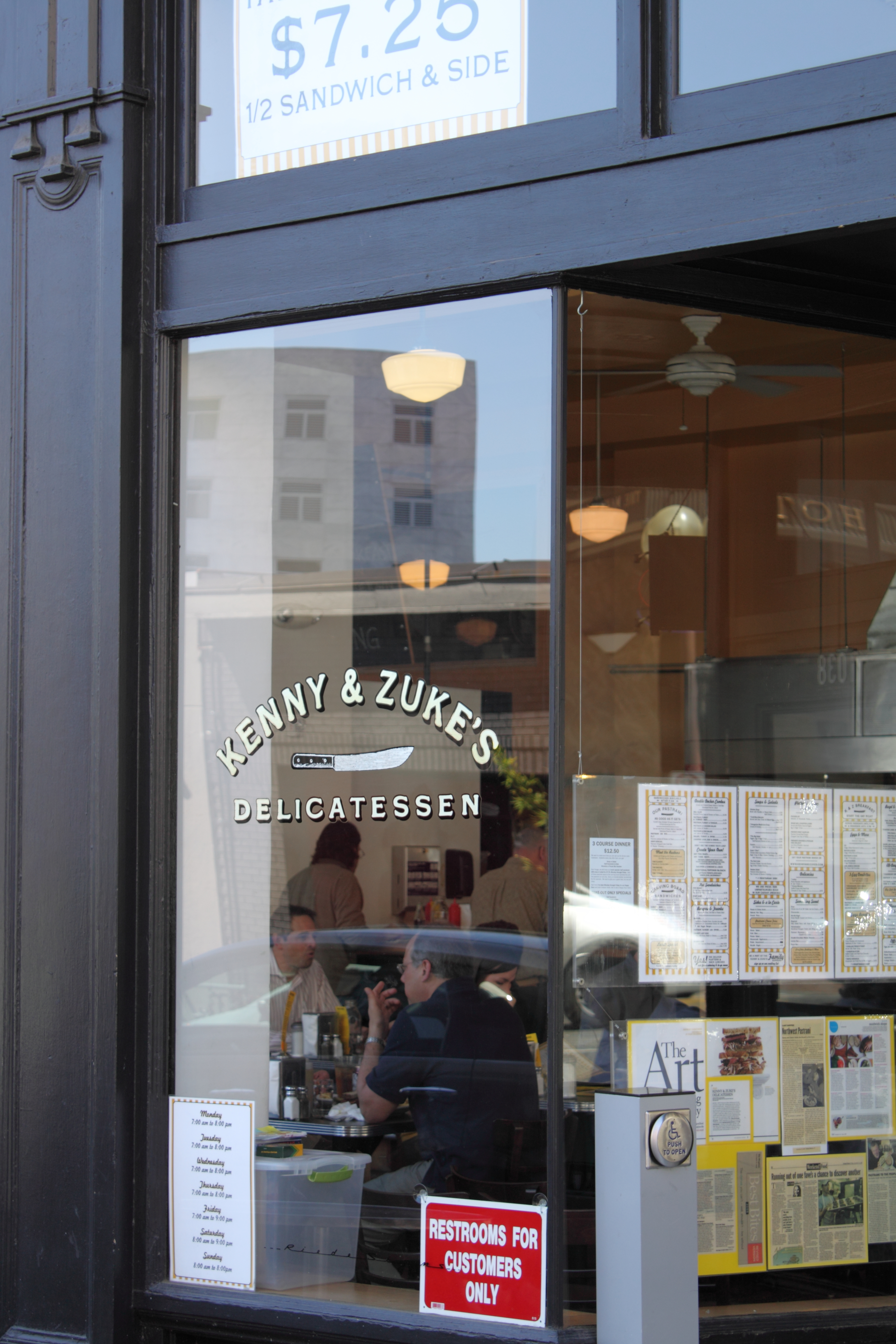
- Sign near main entrance
- Interactive map of Kenny & Zuke's Delicatessen

Restaurant information
- Established: 2007
- Head chef: Ken Gordon
- Dress code: Casual
- Location: 1038 SW Stark St, Portland, Oregon, 97205, United States
- Seating capacity: 67
- Website: www.kennyandzukes.com

Kenny & Zuke's Delicatessen was a Jewish delicatessen in Portland, Oregon serving primarily non-kosher foods. The restaurant closed permanently in November 2023.

== History ==
The restaurant opened in October 2007, however, the principal owners, Ken Gordon and Nick Zukin, began their venture at the Hillsdale Farmers' Market as The Pastrami King in 2006. After regularly selling pastrami, they moved to Ken Gordon's restaurant, Ken's Place, for a Saturday brunch, renaming the venture Kenny & Zuke's. Because of its popularity, the two started looking for a permanent location for the deli. Nick Zukin no longer is associated with Kenny & Zukes.

In September 2019 Ken Gordon confirmed that the company's LLC, Body by Pastrami, was to undergo Chapter 11 reorganization. The decision was prompted by a civil suit from food distributor Performance Food Group, alleging Kenny and Zuke's owes $184,494 in unpaid invoices. According to Gordon, the planned reorganization was to allow the debt owed to multiple creditors to be paid back in full over the course of eight to ten years while drastically decreasing their monthly payments, and allowing the business to remain open. He added that the restaurant was in "absolutely no danger of closing, or curtailing operations in any way".

== Awards and recognition ==
The deli was named one of the top 10 sandwich shops in the country by Bon Appetit. It was also named among the best restaurants in Portland by The Oregonian, which also called the Pastrami Burger one of the city's "Best Bites", and the Willamette Week, which also named it among the best spots for lunch, sandwiches, pre-show dinners, and lines worth the wait. Its Cobb Salad was named best in the city by Portland Monthly.

- Featured in The New York Times as the future of delicatessen.
- Named one of the best delis in the world in Maxim.
- Highlighted in Gourmet as one of two delis in North America leading an artisan revival in Jewish foods.

== See also ==
- List of Ashkenazi Jewish restaurants
- List of delicatessens
