= Alvarado Street =

North–south thoroughfare in Los Angeles, California, United States

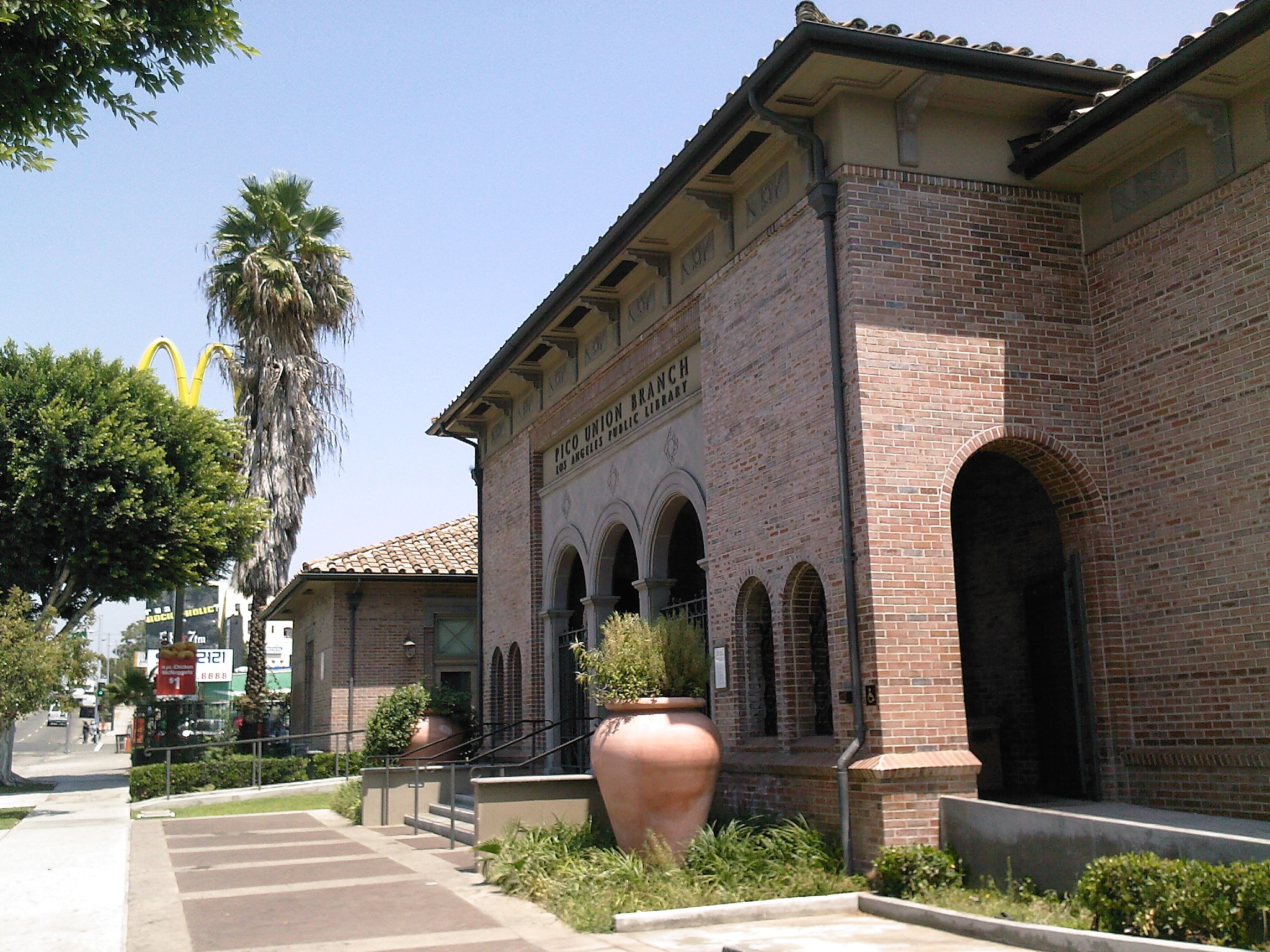
The Pico-Union branch library on Alvarado Street

Alvarado Street is a north–south thoroughfare in Los Angeles, California in the United States. The street was named after California governor Juan Bautista Alvarado.

== Geography ==
North of Glendale Boulevard, it starts off as a residential street. It becomes a major thoroughfare south of Glendale Boulevard. Directly south of Pico Boulevard and north of Venice Boulevard, Alvarado Street merges with Hoover Street. Alvarado Street is signed as State Route 2 from Glendale Boulevard to the Hollywood Freeway. Landmarks on the thoroughfare include the Saint Vincent Medical Center, the Metro station for the B and D Lines at Wilshire Boulevard across from the adjacent MacArthur Park, and the Pico-Union Branch Library.

Langer's Delicatessen-Restaurant and El Pollo Loco's first United States restaurant are located on Alvarado Street, which is where it quickly became a local favorite. Edward's Steak House was originally located on this street. Also, the Peoples Temple's Los Angeles building was located at 1366 South Alvarado Street. The Romanesque Revival–style structure was designed by architect Elmer Grey in 1912 for the First Church of Christ, Scientist.

Metro Local line 2 operates on Alvarado Street. The Metro Shuttle 603 also operates on Alvarado Street going only southbound.

== Notable landmarks ==
- Langer's Deli
- MacArthur Park
- St. Vincent Medical Center
- Westlake Theatre
