= Glendale Boulevard =

Boulevard in Los Angeles, California, USA

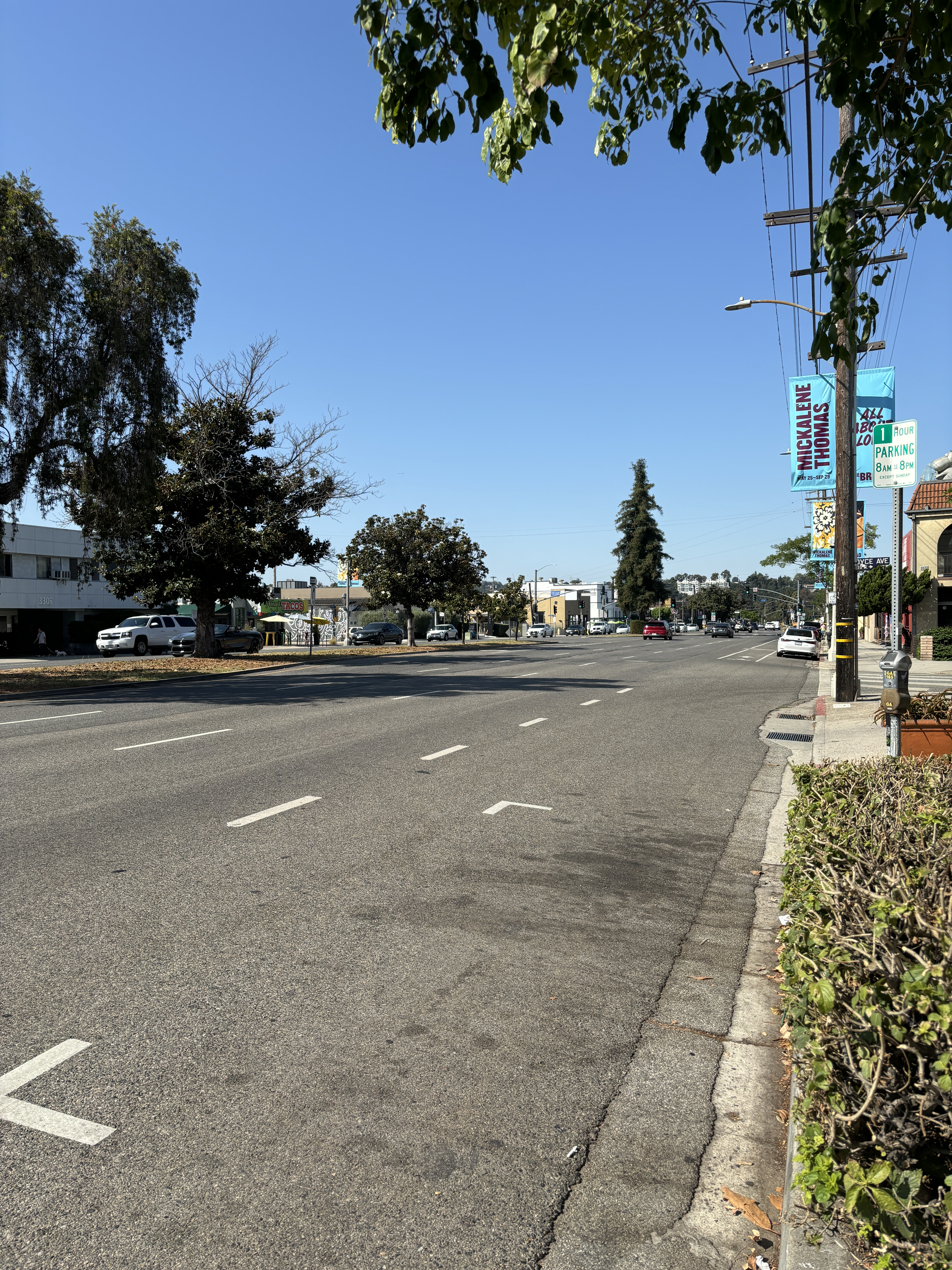
- Interactive map of Glendale Boulevard
- Part of: SR 2 between Alvarado Street and the Glendale Freeway's southern end
- Maintained by: Local jurisdictions
- Length: 4.6 mi (7.4 km)
- South end: Beverly Boulevard / Lucas Avenue / 1st Street / 2nd Street in Los Angeles
- Major junctions: US 101 in Los Angeles; SR 2 in Los Angeles; I-5 in Los Angeles
- North end: Brand Boulevard in Glendale

Glendale Boulevard is a north–south street in Los Angeles. It starts off as Lucas Avenue at 7th Street west of Downtown Los Angeles, California.

== Background ==
The name changes at Beverly Boulevard in Echo Park, north of the Hollywood Freeway (U.S. Route 101) at Bellevue Avenue. State Route 2 runs from Alvarado Street until the freeway entrance north of Allesandro Street.

Northeast of Riverside Drive and Interstate 5, it merges with Hyperion Avenue, forming the Glendale-Hyperion Bridge over the Los Angeles River.

As it passes underneath the train tracks of the Metrolink and Amtrak, it enters Glendale and changes to Brand Boulevard, a principal north–south thoroughfare in Glendale, marking the west–east postal divider of that city that finally ends at Kenneth Road.

Glendale was formerly the road long which the Glendale line of the Red Car street cars ran. It is now home to creatives, boutique shops, and other retailers. An obelisk raised in 1954 by Frank McKee, a former actor, on what they believed was the former site of the Sennett film studio, to commemorate the film industry, used to be located on Glendale Boulevard but was removed in 2008.

G-Son Studios, former recording studios of the Beastie Boys, are located at the corner of Glendale Boulevard and Larga Avenue.

== Transit ==
Metro Local line 92 operates on Glendale Boulevard.

== See also ==
- List of streets in the San Gabriel Valley
