= Kaufman's Deli =

Delicatessen in Skokie, IL USA

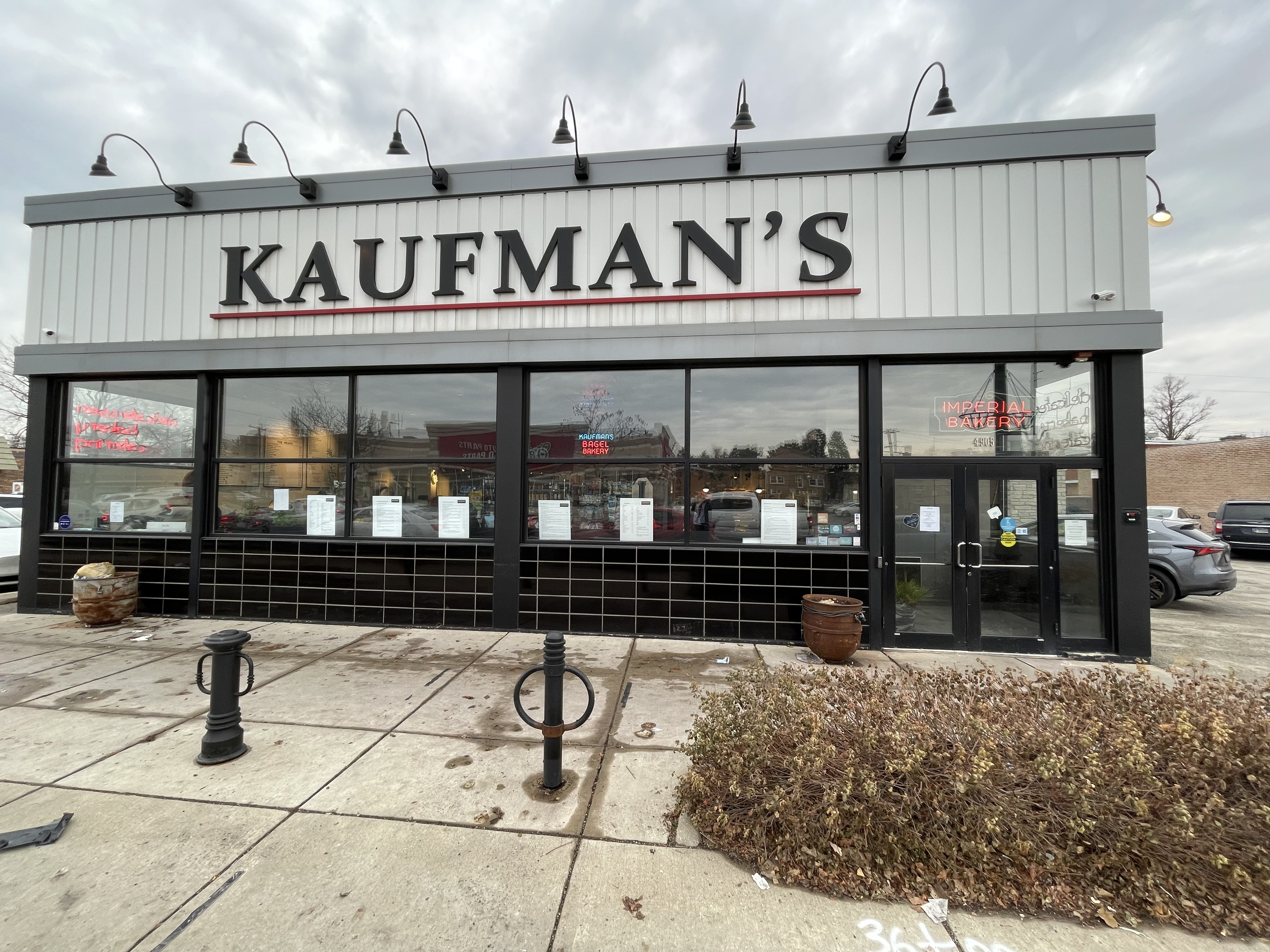
- Exterior of Kaufman's Deli in Skokie, IL
- Interactive map of Kaufman's Deli

Restaurant information
- Established: 1960s; 65 years ago
- Owner: Bette Dworkin
- Food type: Delicatessen
- Location: 4905 Dempster St, Skokie, Illinois, Cook County, Illinois, 60077, United States
- Coordinates: 42.0405°N 87.7497°W
- Website: https://kaufmansdeli.com/

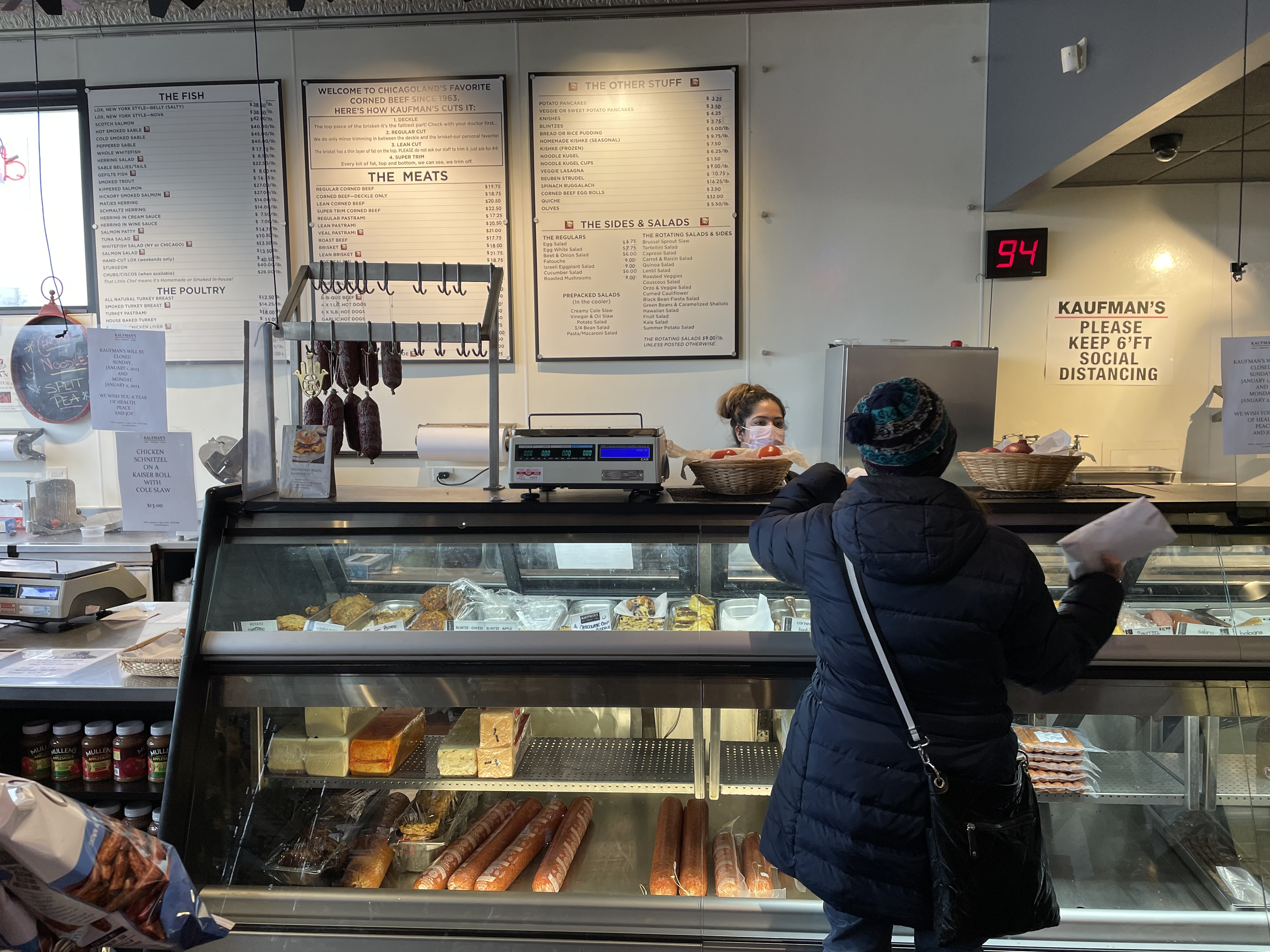
Interior of Kaufman's Deli in Skokie, IL

Kaufman's, or Kaufman's Deli is a delicatessen in Skokie, Illinois in the United States. The deli opened in the 1960s as a hub for holocaust survivors, and is one of the Chicago area's oldest operating Jewish delis. The deli has been owned by the Dworkin family since 1984, and was rebuilt after a 2011 fire. Bagels at Kaufmans use caraway seeds, which is a Midwestern style.

== See also ==
- List of Ashkenazi Jewish restaurants
