= Ben's Kosher Deli =

American Jewish deli chain

Coordinates: 40.7787°N 73.7785°W

Ben's Kosher Deli (colloquially known as Ben's) is a New York City-based Jewish deli chain with locations in Queens, on Long Island and in Boca Raton, Florida.

== History ==
Ben's was founded in 1972. Ben's formerly operated a midtown location which had catered events such as Broadway premieres and fashion shows, such as the 2023 Batsheva Hay show. The owner of Ben's, Ronnie Dragoon, owned at one time seven locations. He started the business when he was 24 years old. The restaurant is kosher certified by mashgichim affiliated with the Rabbinical Assembly. It is open on Shabbat.

The Scarsdale location was open from 2015 until 2021. The Manhattan location merged with a strictly kosher restaurant called Mr. Broadway.

== See also ==
- List of Ashkenazi Jewish restaurants
