= D.Z. Akin's =

Coordinates: 32.775038°N 117.048981°W

D.Z. Akin's Deli
- Interactive map of D.Z. Akin's Deli

Restaurant information
- Established: 1980
- Owners: Zvika Akin; Debbie Akin
- Food type: Jewish deli
- Dress code: Casual
- Location: 6930 Alvarado Rd, San Diego, California, 92120, United States
- Website: dzakinsdeli.com

D.Z. Akin's Delicatessen is a New York-style Jewish deli and restaurant in San Diego, California. It was opened in 1980 by Zvika and Debbie Akin. They are known for their "fresser" sandwich, a Yiddish term for "one who eats." It has 16 slices of pastrami, turkey, corned beef, roast beef, and others with cheese and tomato on rye bread. It serves up to 2-3 people. The bakery includes rugelach, strudel, and chocolate eclairs. The restaurant has over 130 sandwiches on the menu, and also has fountain sodas, ice cream sundaes, and malted milkshakes.

== Ratings ==
DZ Akin's has been highly rated and described as "the restaurant that ate San Diego." San Diego Magazine and San Diego Daily Beat considered Akin's the city's best deli.

== See also ==
- List of Ashkenazi Jewish restaurants
- List of delicatessens
