= Torah High Schools of San Diego =

Location
- 9001 Towne Center Drive; San Diego, California 92122; United States; 33.01673°N 117.16232°W

Information
- Type: Private
- Religious affiliation: Jewish
- Established: 1999; 27 years ago
- Dean: Rabbi Mark Peikes
- Gender: Girls
- Color: Lavender
- Website: www.torahsandiego.com

Torah High Schools of San Diego (THSSD) is a private, Jewish, girls high school in San Diego, California, with students between grades 9 and 12. It was founded in 1999 as an affiliate of Yeshivas Chofetz Chaim in New York City.

THSSD is the first Orthodox Jewish girls high school in the city of San Diego and currently the only school of its kind in San Diego County. It is the first Western Association of Schools and Colleges–accredited Jewish high school in the city.

THSSD is located at the Congregation Beth Israel campus in University City. The school combines a college preparatory curriculum with Torah study.
