= Jerry's Famous Deli =

Chain of Jewish delis in the United States

Coordinates: 34.144730°N 118.409118°W

Jerry's Famous Deli was a chain of Jewish delicatessens. The deli chain was noted for its celebrity clientele, including Shaquille O'Neal, Will Smith, Adam Sandler and the cast of Seinfeld. Andy Kaufman once worked at the Studio City deli as a busboy.

== History ==
The chain's first store started in 1973 under the name Solley's. It was launched as Jerry's Famous Deli in 1978 in Studio City, California by Isaac Starkman and Jerry Seidman. It was a reference to Jerry Seidman's first name, even though he left the company in the 1980s. The CEO was Starkman's son, Guy Starkman. The Starkman family also owned two nightclubs in Los Angeles.

At one time, there were Jerry's Famous Deli locations in Encino, Studio City, CA, Marina del Rey, Westwood Village (near UCLA), and as well as Costa Mesa, CA, Woodland Hills, CA, and Beverly Hills, CA. There was a single similar location, Jerry's Patio Cafe & Bar, in Marina del Rey, CA is now closed.

During the 1990s, the chain made several acquisitions nationwide. On the original Jerry's Famous Deli in Studio City with the founders present as well as Los Angeles City Councilman Zev Yaroslavsky and celebrities such as singer Robbie Williams. The founder of the chain died, leaving a heavy debt behind. In 2010, the Miami location received the presidential visit of Barack Obama who ate there, and then got written up the next week for 26 restaurant violations relating to hygiene.

=== Closures ===
On March 20, 2012, the Costa Mesa branch of Jerry's Famous Deli closed permanently after the landlord did not renew the restaurant's lease. On May 31, 2013, after 20 years of existence, the Beverly locale closed permanently. In 2013, the chain experimented with a market-deli concept, admitting that the "old-style deli no longer works in a chain format". Jerry's Deli was still the owner of two Epicure markets located in Florida acquired in the 1990s.

On October 16, 2016, the Woodland Hills Jerry's Famous Deli closed permanently. The Woodland Hills location was the brands historic restaurant. Only three locations remained.

On August 25, 2020, the Jerry's Famous Deli in Marina del Rey reopened as Jerry's Patio Cafe & Bar, offering outdoor dining and takeout, in order to continue operation amidst the COVID-19 pandemic.

On October 30, 2020, the original Jerry's Famous Deli in Studio City closed permanently due to the COVID-19 pandemic. It had been extant for 42 years.

== See also ==
- List of Ashkenazi Jewish restaurants
- List of delicatessens
