= Langer's Deli =

Delicatessen in Los Angeles, California, U.S.

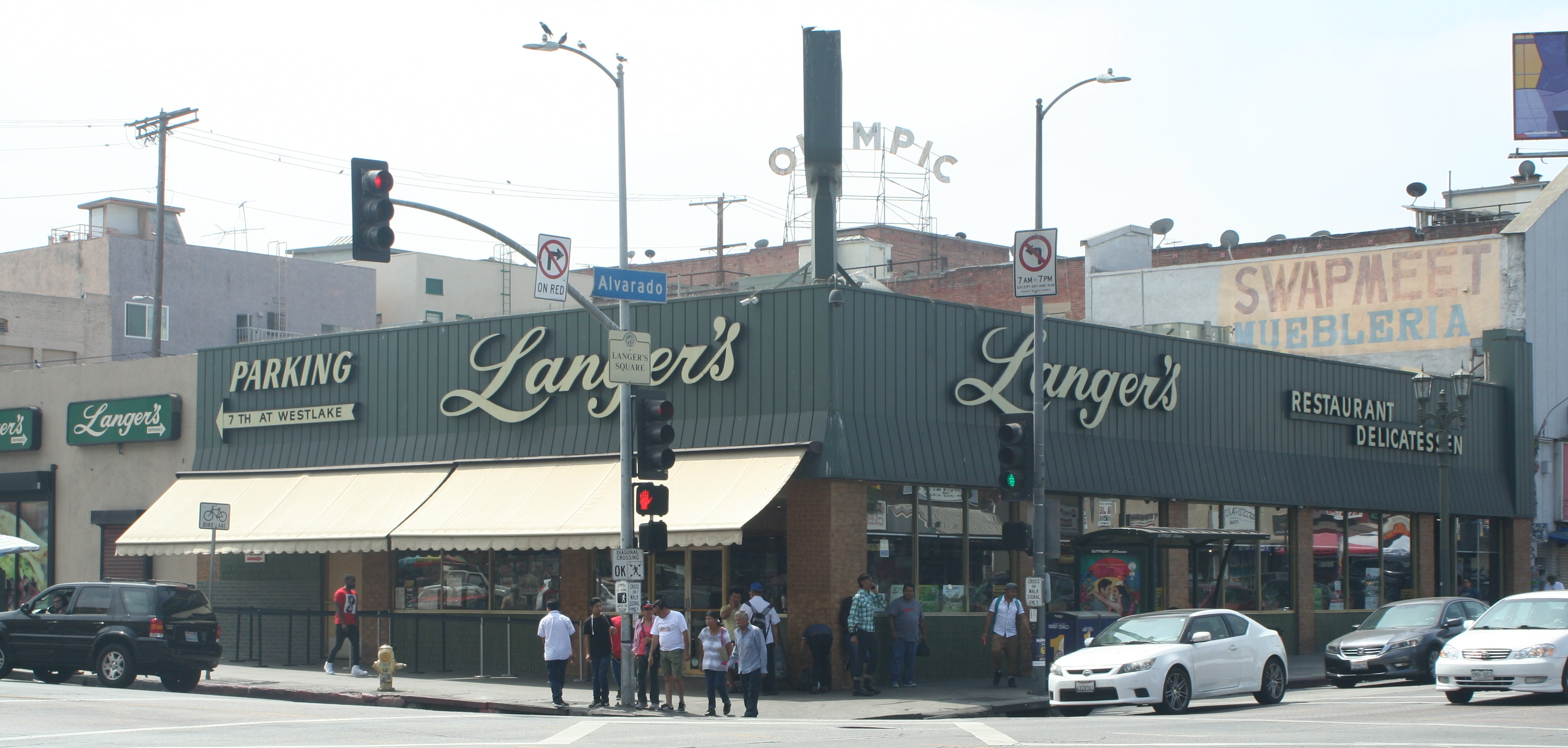
- Exterior of Langer's Deli, taken from the northwest corner of Alvarado Street
- Interactive map of Langer's Deli

Restaurant information
- Established: 1947
- Owner: Langer family
- Food type: Delicatessen
- Dress code: Casual
- Location: 704 South Alvarado Street, Los Angeles, California, 90057, United States
- Coordinates: 34.0562°N 118.2768°W
- Website: www.langersdeli.com

Langer's Deli, also known as Langer's Delicatessen-Restaurant, is a kosher-style delicatessen located at 704 South Alvarado Street in the Westlake neighborhood of Los Angeles, opposite MacArthur Park.

Founded in 1947, Langer's is known for its No. 19 pastrami on rye sandwich, described by the Los Angeles Times as "the Marilyn Monroe of pastrami sandwiches". Since its founding, the restaurant claims to have sold over twenty million pounds (9,100,000 kg) of pastrami, and its pastrami has been deemed by some as being the best in the world.

== History ==
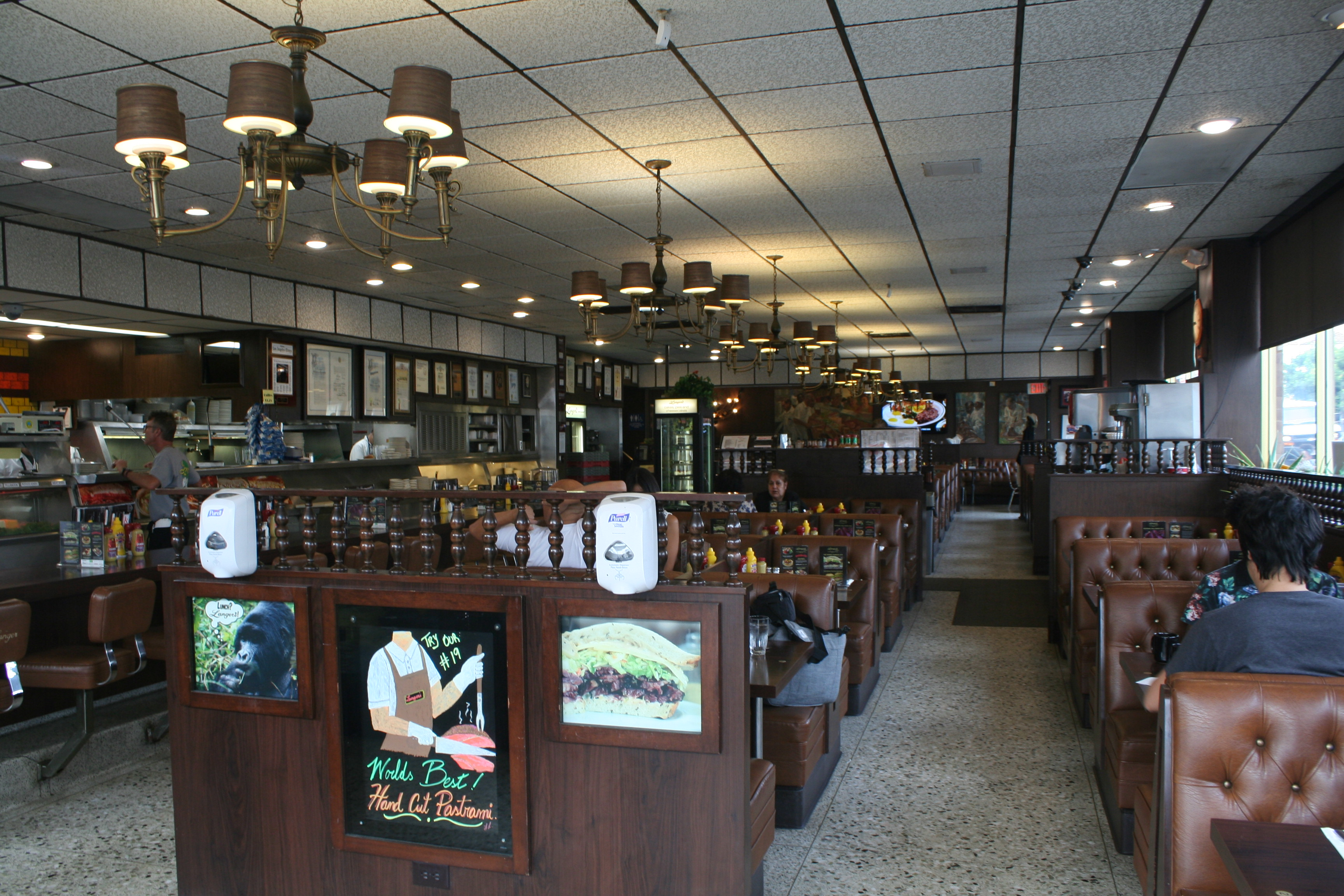
Inside Langer's on a weekday morning

Langer's Deli was opened in June 1947 by Albert J. Langer, initially as a deli catering to the waves of new Jewish immigrants arriving in Los Angeles. Langer had previously sold off a smaller shop at the corner of 8th and Irolo Streets in present-day Koreatown when he had heard of a pair of German immigrants selling their sandwich shop on Alvarado Street. With the help of a German friend who helped him look over the deal, Langer acquired the shop for $14,500 (equivalent to $209,072 in 2025).

Langer's initially opened with only $500 on hand, requiring loans from partner businesses and operating with only Langer, his wife Jean, and a dishwasher, working sixteen-hour days. Corned beef sandwiches initially sold for only 35 cents, and throughout the 1940s and 1950s, most of its clientele came from the Jewish immigrants who inhabited the hotels and boarding houses surrounding MacArthur Park at the time.

Despite most of Westlake's Jewish businesses moving west by the 1960s and the neighborhood suffering significant decline by the 1980s, Langer kept his restaurant open, convinced that it would continue to have customers. Increased gang activity fueled by the crack epidemic seriously affected business by 1990, and by 1993, the restaurant was seriously doubting its future, with it even considering closing entirely.

However, Langer credits its survival to the opening of the Red Line of the Los Angeles Metro Rail, with the Westlake/MacArthur Park station opening a block away. Office workers in downtown Los Angeles would take the Red Line from 7th Street/Metro Center to Langer's, providing a steady stream of business, and Los Angeles County Supervisor Zev Yaroslavsky even joked that the $1.2 billion spent on building the line's initial operating segment was worth it to keep Langer's open. Despite the opening of the Red Line, neighborhood activity continues to affect operations, with an increase in Metro Rail fares causing revenue to drop by 30% in 1997, and unlicensed street vendors causing a 23% decline in business in 2015.

Langer's celebrated its 60th anniversary in 2007, culminating in the renaming of the intersection of 7th and Alvarado Streets as Langer's Square on January 23, 2008, which would have been Albert Langer's 95th birthday. However, Langer died on June 26, 2007, and ownership of the restaurant passed to his son, Norm, who started working at Langer's in 1962 and who had been running it since the early 1990s.

== Location and operations ==
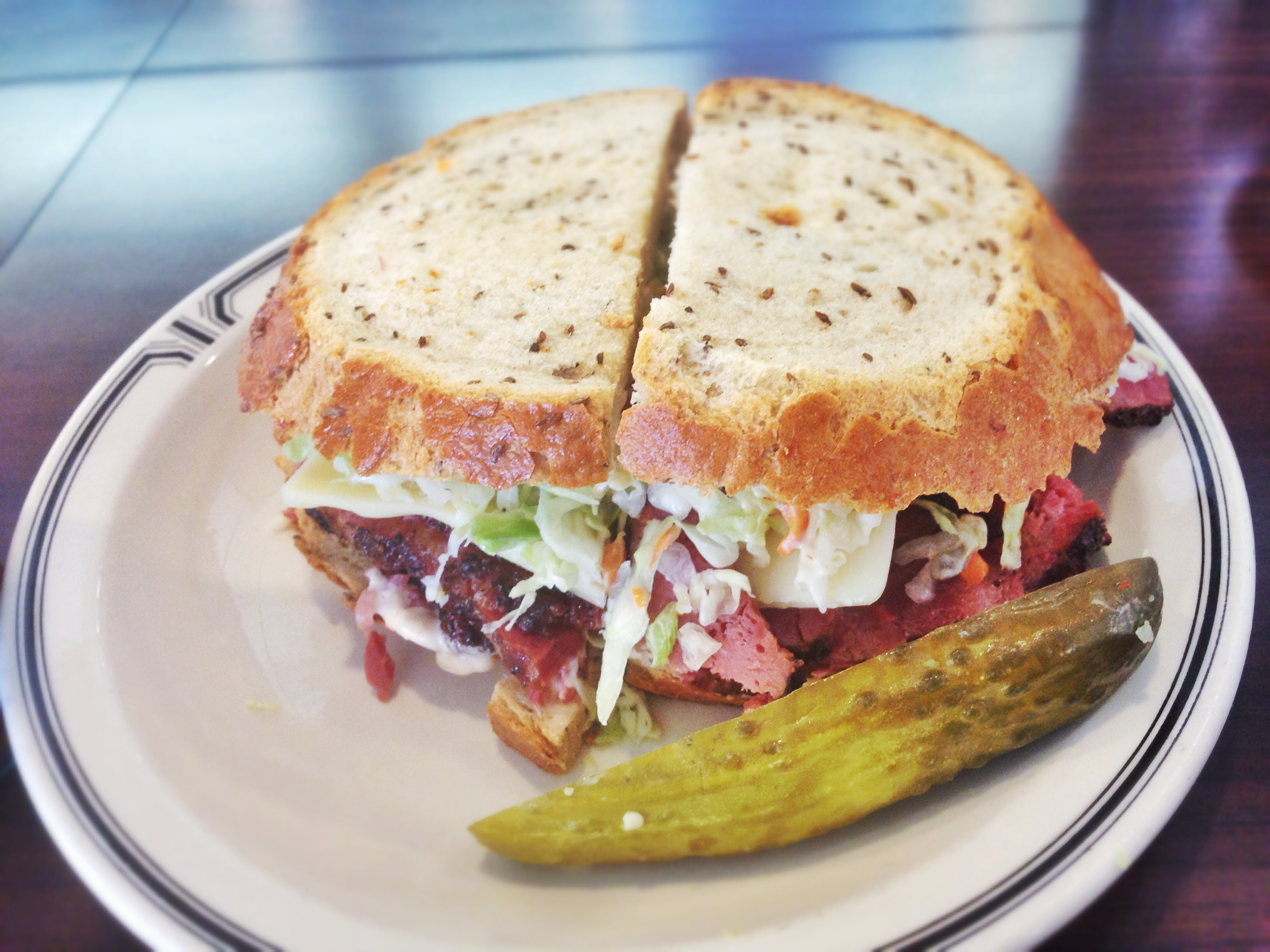
The No. 19 pastrami on rye sandwich is Langer's signature dish

Langer's Deli currently occupies a 4,300-square-foot (400 m^{2}) space at the corner of Alvarado and 7th Streets. Originally operating as a 12-seat restaurant along Alvarado Street, the restaurant has since expanded to 137 seats. In 1953, Albert Langer bought out a neighboring liquor store, and in 1967, he acquired the space of a bank that was vacating the corner of Alvarado and 7th Streets, consolidating the three spaces and building the current restaurant. While the Langer family owns the restaurant itself, the property is owned by the family of property broker John Alle, whose family has been friends with the Langers since the 1950s. In 2018, the property was put up for sale.

Until the 1990s, Langer's stayed open as late as 3:00 am, catering to patrons of nearby bars. However, business considerations and safety concerns due to the Westlake neighborhood's changing makeup forced it to cut costs by laying off employees and cutting opening times. Since 1993, the restaurant is open from 8:00 am to 4:00 pm on weekdays and Saturdays, remaining closed on Sundays. Operating hours however are extended for special occasions, like its 65th anniversary in 2012, the installation of a new art fixture inside MacArthur Park in 2015, and its 75th anniversary in 2022.

Although it is a sit-down restaurant, Langer's is also known for its curbside service, which was introduced at the suggestion of an employee, Alex Barragan, who promised to deliver an order to a waiting customer outside. Curbside service has been successful for the restaurant, with anywhere between 35 and 70 orders being delivered daily.

Langer's employees are unionized, and the restaurant has a reputation for remaining loyal to its employees, offering full benefits, and giving support when needed. Many of its employees are also employed at Canter's in the Fairfax District, with the two restaurants sharing employees due to a talent shortage. The relationship between the two restaurants dates back to the 1930s when Albert Langer found work as a deli man at Canter's before opening his restaurant.

=== Operations during the COVID-19 pandemic ===
Due to the COVID-19 pandemic in California, Langer's closed its dining room for the first time in its history on March 16, 2020, in compliance with city directives, with Norm Langer telling the Los Angeles Times that he was "irked" by the order. Transitioning to a takeout-only operation during the pandemic, the dining room reopened on June 15, 2021, with the complete lifting of restaurant pandemic restrictions throughout California, with Langer, his employees, City Attorney Mike Feuer and Los Angeles Police Department chief Michel Moore leading a ribbon-cutting ceremony to mark the occasion.

A month later on July 31, 2021, Langer's instituted a vaccination requirement in response to the spread of the SARS-CoV-2 Delta variant, with all patrons being required to show proof of vaccination before being allowed to enter. Since its imposition the restaurant has refused entry to around a dozen customers a day on average, and the mandate has been largely received positively. The requirement has also been extended to the restaurant's employees, with almost all employees being vaccinated.

== Awards and accolades ==
In 1997, the Los Angeles Times reported that Councilman Mike Hernandez was sponsoring a resolution in the Los Angeles City Council honoring the restaurant. Four years later, Langer's was awarded the America's Classics award by the James Beard Foundation, the second restaurant in Los Angeles (after Philippe's, awarded in 1999) to be given the honor.

On May 28, 2019, Langer's was named a Michelin Guide Bib Gourmand honoree — one of 86 new restaurants to be given the honor with the introduction of a California-wide Michelin Guide. The No. 19 sandwich, meanwhile, was named the best sandwich in California by Food & Wine on January 11, 2021.

== See also ==
- List of Ashkenazi Jewish restaurants
