= Brent's Deli =

Coordinates: 34.1916°N 118.7628°W

- Interactive map of Brent's Deli

Restaurant information
- Established: 1967
- Owner: Ron Peskin
- Head chef: Ron Peskin
- Food type: Jewish deli
- Dress code: Casual
- Location: 19565 Parthenia St, Northridge, Los Angeles, California, 91324, United States
- Website: www.brentsdeli.com

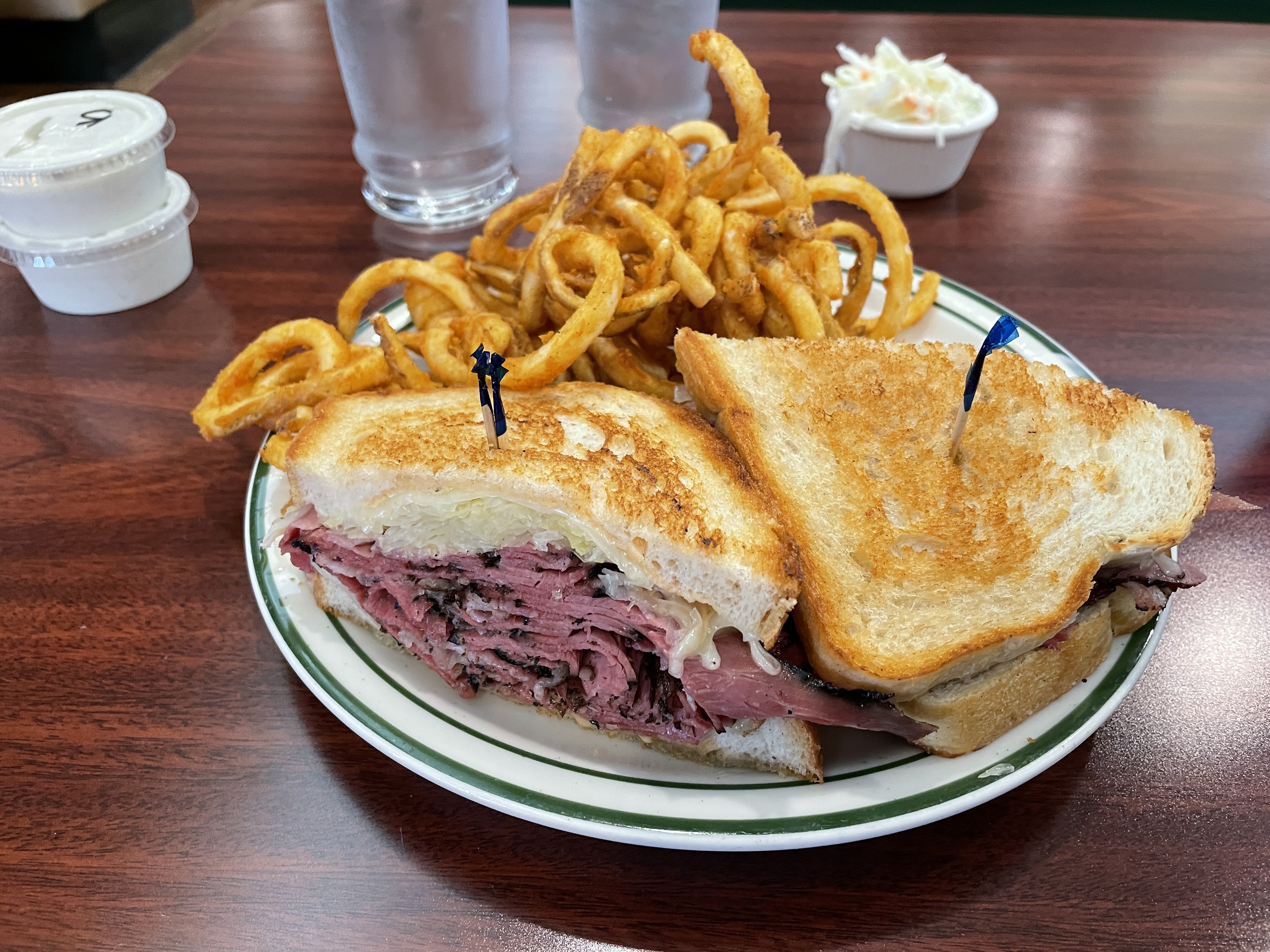
Pastrami Reuben on Sourdough from Brent's Deli

Brent's Delicatessen & Restaurant is a Jewish deli and restaurant located in Northridge, California. The restaurant was opened in 1967 and purchased by Ron Peskin in 1969 for $1700. The deli has expanded to a second location in Westlake Village, California.

== Ratings ==
Brent's Deli has been highly rated by food critics. The deli is known for producing most of their own food in-house and has been described as "unheralded but authentic".

On The Best Thing I Ever Ate, Marc Summers says the best corned beef sandwich was at Brent's.

== See also ==
- List of Ashkenazi Jewish restaurants
- List of delicatessens
