= List of Jewish delis =

This is a list of notable Jewish delis. A Jewish deli is a store that serves traditional Ashkenazi Jewish cuisine. This usually includes pastrami on rye, corned beef sandwiches, and other sandwiches, various salads such as tuna salad and potato salad, side dishes such as latkes, potato Kinishes and kugel, desserts such as black and white cookies and rugelach, as well as other dishes found in Ashkenazi Jewish cuisine. Jewish delis may serve kosher or kosher-style food. In the case of kosher-style delis, they also offer dairy and meat together even though this is against Jewish dietary law. It is these Jewish delis which serve Reuben sandwiches and noodle kugel, among other dishes.

Ashkenazi Jews brought the deli to North America and popularized it within American culture.

== United States ==
=== California ===
- Brent's Deli – deli in Northridge, Los Angeles
- Canter's – Fairfax district of Los Angeles
- Langer's Deli – Westlake, Los Angeles
- Nate 'n Al – Beverly Hills
- D.Z. Akin's Delicatessen – San Diego, California
- Mort's Deli - Tarzana, California

=== Connecticut ===
- Rein's Deli – Vernon, Connecticut

=== Illinois ===
- Kaufman's Deli - Skokie
- Manny's Deli – Near West Side, Chicago

=== Michigan ===
- Zingerman's Deli – Ann Arbor

=== New York City ===
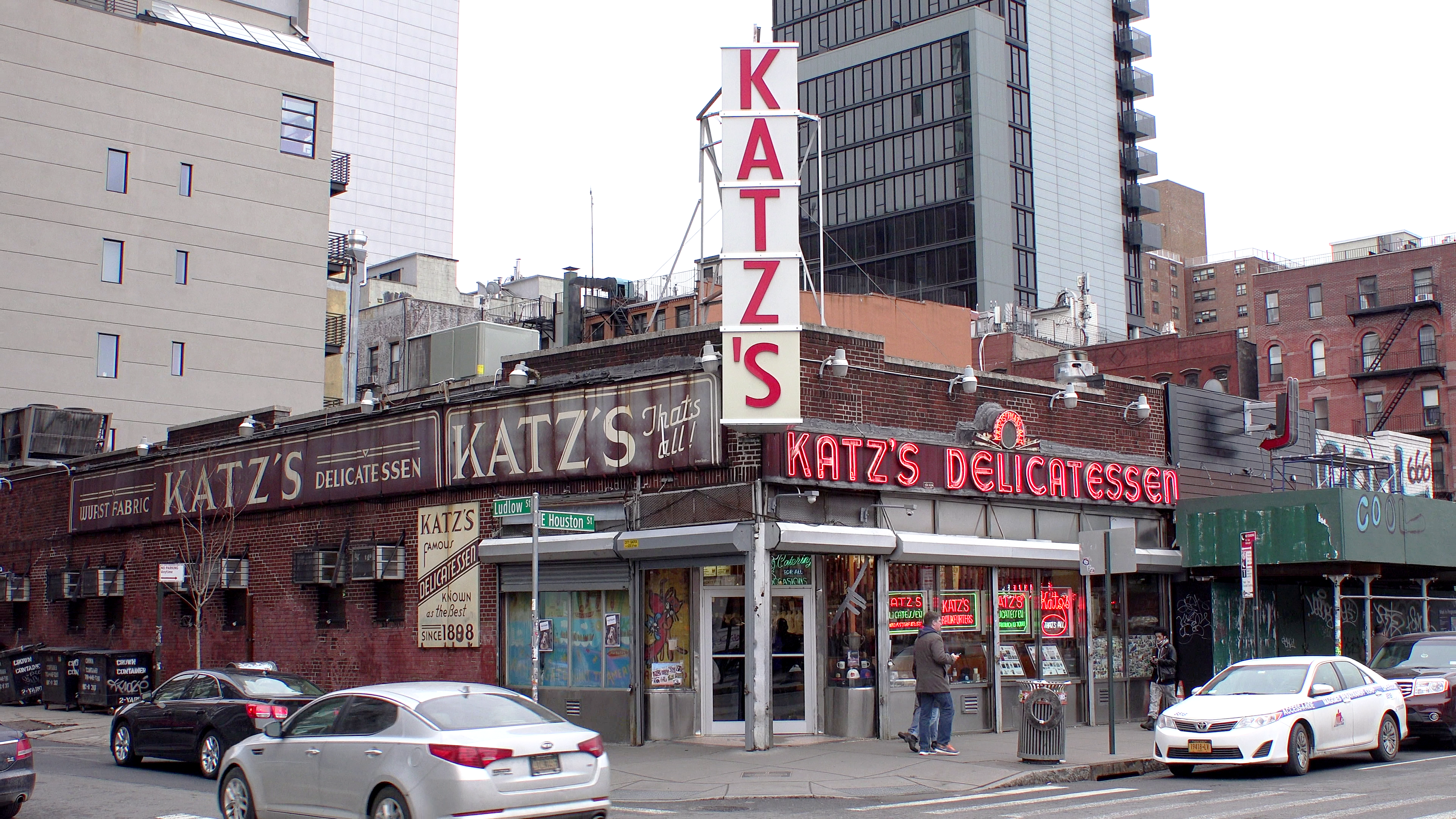
A view of Katz's Delicatessen in New York City

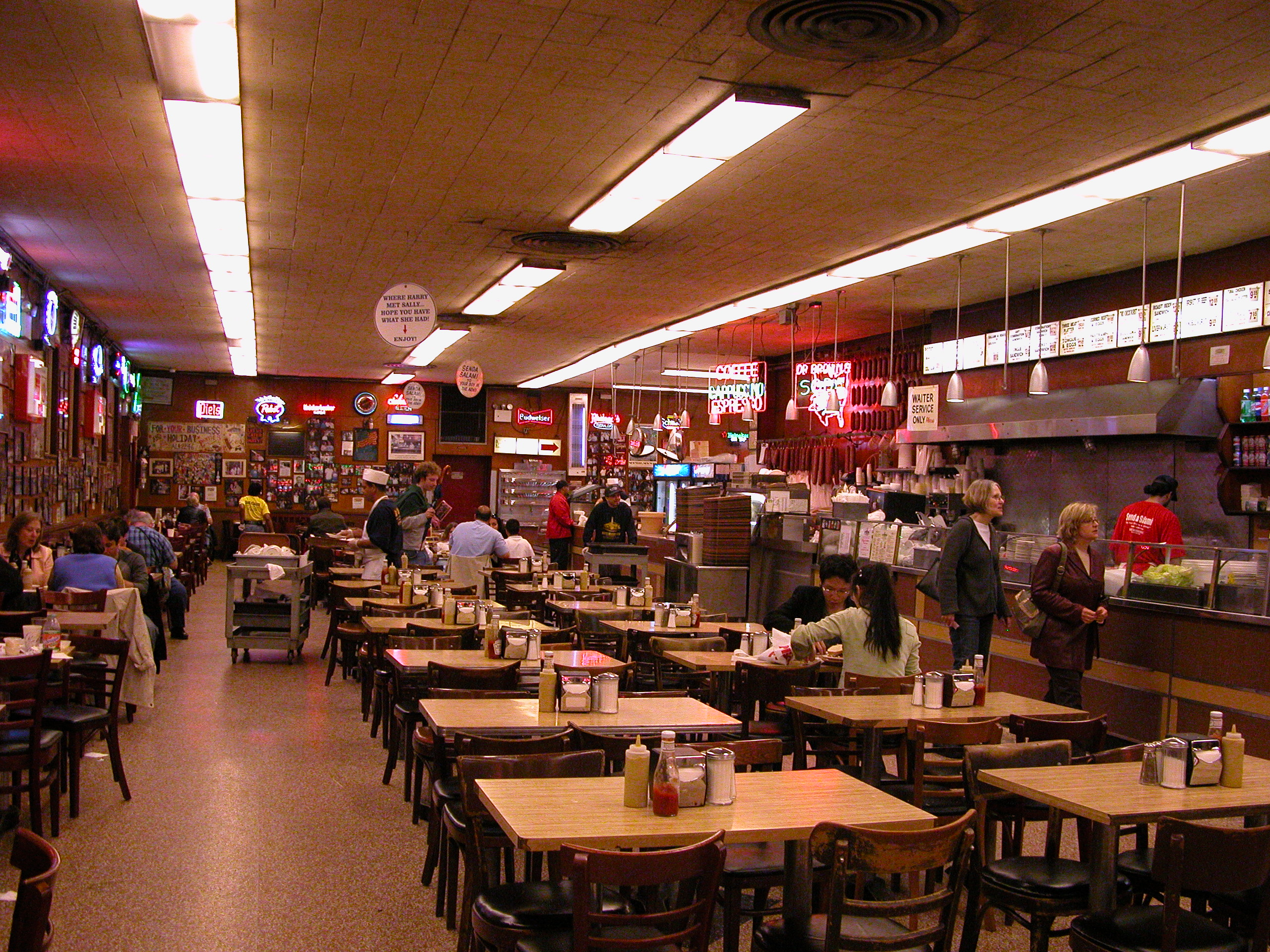
An interior view of Katz's Delicatessen, a kosher style restaurant in New York City

- Barney Greengrass – Upper West Side, Manhattan
- Ben's Kosher Deli - Queens, Long Island
- Carnegie Deli – Midtown Manhattan, near Carnegie Hall
- Katz's Delicatessen – Kosher style deli on the Lower East Side of Manhattan
- Liebman's Deli – Bronx
- Mile End Delicatessen – Montreal-style smoked meat in Boerum Hill, Brooklyn
- Pastrami Queen (took over Fine & Schapiro)
- Russ & Daughters and their café and restaurant under the same name on the Lower East Side. The original location is an appetizing store.
- Sarge's Deli - Manhattan
- Second Avenue Deli – Certified kosher delicatessen in Murray Hill, Manhattan with a second location on the Upper East Side
- Zabar's – An appetizing store on the Upper West Side of Manhattan well known for its smoked fish and other deli items

=== Texas ===
- Kenny & Ziggy's New York Delicatessen – Houston, see more information at: Ziggy Gruber

=== Washington ===
- Dingfelder's Delicatessen, Seattle
- Zylberschtein's, Seattle

=== Washington, D.C. ===
- Call Your Mother
- Loeb's NY Deli

== Canada ==
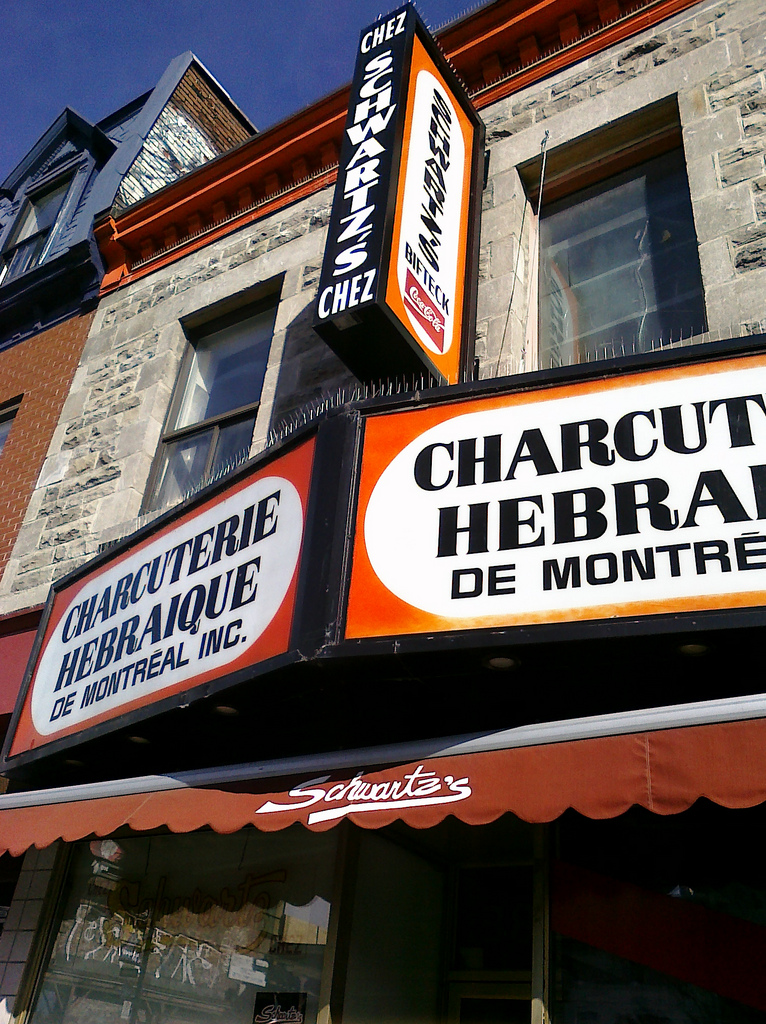
Schwartz's delicatessen in Montreal

- Dunn's – Montreal
- Chenoy's – Montreal
- Caplansky's Delicatessen – Toronto
- J&R Kosher Meat and Delicatessen – Montreal
- Schwartz's – Montreal
- Shopsy's – Toronto
- SumiLicious Smoked Meat & Deli – Toronto
- Wilensky's – Montreal

== Defunct Jewish delis ==
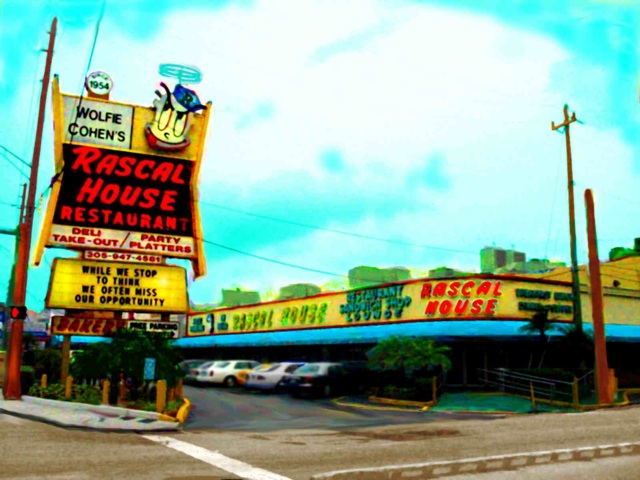
Wolfie Cohen's Rascal House

- Bens De Luxe Delicatessen & Restaurant – Montreal. Closed in 2006.
- Bloom's restaurant – London based deli with multiple locations. Last location in Golders Green closed in 2010.
- Gaby's Deli – in London's Charing Cross Road where it was patronised by political and theatrical celebrities
- Jerry's Famous Deli – Two locations in Los Angeles. Closed in 2020.
- Kornblatt's Delicatessen - Portland. Closed in 2023.
- Lindy's – Two locations in Manhattan. The original one closed in 1969 and their second location closed in February 2018.
- Loeser's Deli
- Main Deli Steak House – Montreal. Closed in 2023.
- Mort's Palisades Deli – A neighborhood fixture and Jewish deli located in Pacific Palisades, California, that closed in 2007
- Reuben's Restaurant – Closed in 2001.
- Stage Deli - famous Times Square area deli that closed in 2012
- Wolfie Cohen's Rascal House – A Jewish delicatessen located in Sunny Isles Beach, Florida. It opened in May 1954 and closed on March 30, 2008.

== See also ==
- List of kosher restaurants
- Lists of restaurants
- Pastrami on rye – a classic sandwich made famous in the Jewish kosher delicatessens of New York City
- Save the Deli – a book about the decline of the Jewish delicatessen
