= SumiLicious Smoked Meat & Deli =

Deli in Scarborough, Ontario, Canada

- Interactive map of SumiLicious Smoked Meat & Deli

Restaurant information
- Established: April 27, 2018
- Owner: Sumith Fernando
- Head chef: Sumith Fernando
- Food type: Jewish delicatessen
- Rating: Bib Gourmand (Michelin Guide)
- Location: 5631 Steeles Avenue East, Toronto, Ontario, Canada
- Coordinates: 43.8324°N 79.2673°W
- Website: sumilicious.ca

SumiLicious Smoked Meat & Deli is a Jewish delicatessen in the Scarborough neighbourhood of Toronto, Ontario, Canada.

== History ==
The restaurant opened in April 2018, located on Steeles Avenue at the border of Scarborough and Markham. It is known for its Montreal-style smoked meat sandwiches.

The restaurant is owned by Sumith Fernando, a Sri Lankan Catholic immigrant who learned how to prepare smoked meat while living in Montreal and working behind the counter at well-known Jewish delicatessen Schwartz's for nearly twenty years.

== Smoked Meat ==
Fernando cites Schwartz's preparation of smoked meat as a basis for his own recipe. Montreal-style smoked meat is a type of kosher-style deli meat made from beef brisket that is cured with spices and salt. The brisket is left to absorb the flavors for about a week, after which it is hot-smoked and finally steamed until fully cooked. The meat at SumiLicious is marinated for 10 days, smoked for eight hours and steamed for three.

In addition to serving their smoked meat in their sandwiches, the restaurant also offers a poutine topped with smoked meat.

Many of the restaurant's accompaniments are inspired by typical Montreal smoked meat pairings, such as black cherry soda and pickled peppers from a Montreal-based company.

== Recognition ==
The business was named a Bib Gourmand restaurant by the Michelin Guide at Toronto's 2022 Michelin Guide ceremony, and has retained this recognition each year following. A Bib Gourmand recognition is awarded to restaurants who offer "exceptionally good food at moderate prices". Until the 2024 edition, SumiLicious was the only Scarborough restaurant to be included in the Michelin Guide.

== See also ==
- List of delicatessens
- List of Jewish delis
- List of Michelin Bib Gourmand restaurants in Canada
