= Pastrami Queen =

Coordinates: 40°46′40.2″N 73°58′49.0″W

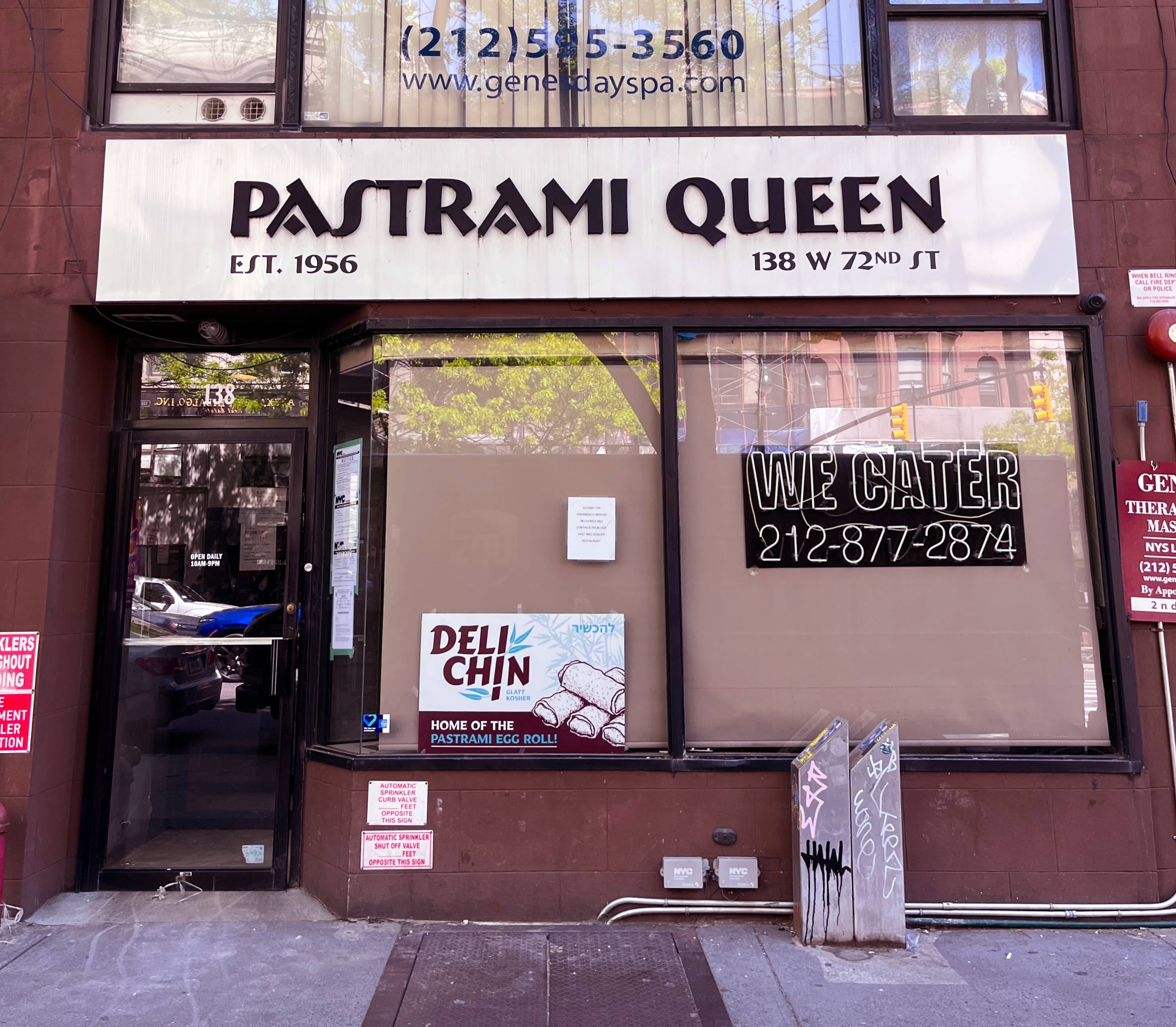
- Pastrami Queen's Upper West Side location.
- Interactive map of Pastrami Queen

Restaurant information
- Owners: Jonah and Alan Phillips
- Location: 138 West 72nd Street, New York City, Manhattan, New York
- Other locations: 1125 Lexington Avenue, New York City, NY 10075

The Pastrami Queen is a Jewish deli on the Upper East Side of Manhattan which opened as Pastrami King in Williamsburg, Brooklyn before moving to Kew Gardens, Queens in 1961. The kosher restaurant opened in 1956. They've since opened (2020) a location on the Upper West Side considered their flagship location. They took over the former Fine & Schapiro, a long-time kosher deli in the space.

== Reviews ==
In 2016, Anthony Bourdain said: "If I'm away from New York long enough, I need a correct pastrami sandwich from either Pastrami Queen or Katz's. And you're not getting that anywhere else, as far as I'm concerned."

== See also ==
- List of Ashkenazi Jewish restaurants
