= Zylberschtein's =

Jewish deli in Seattle, Washington, U.S.

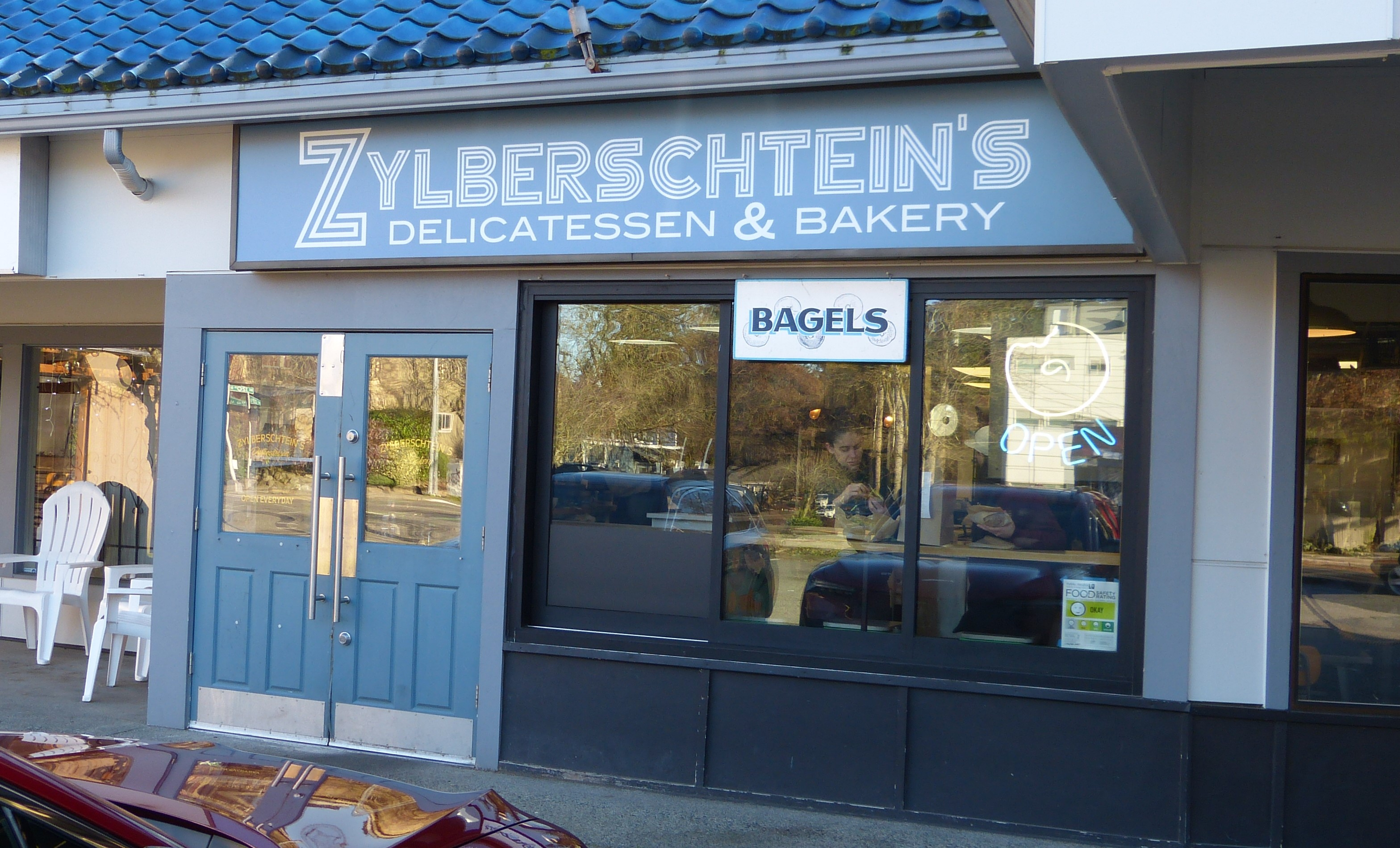
- Zylberschtein's deli in 2026
- Interactive map of Zylberschtein's

Restaurant information
- Owner: Josh Grunig
- Food type: Jewish
- Location: Seattle, King, Washington, United States
- Coordinates: 47.71556°N 122.31225°W
- Website: zylberschtein.com

Zylberschtein's is a Jewish deli and bakery in the Pinehurst neighborhood of northern Seattle, Washington, United States. The deli is named after owner Josh Grunig's great grandfather Morris Zylberschtein.

== Description ==
Owned by Josh Grunig, the delicatessen offers bagels and other breads, sandwiches, cakes, and pastries such as hamentashen. For Hanukkah, the deli has served "brisket-and-latke" dinners and offered special take-out meals. For Passover Seder, Zylberschtein's has sold take-out meals with vegetarian jackfruit brisket, roasted vegetables, matzo ball or roast vegetable soup, charoset, and matzah. In 2022, the meals included brisket, harissa roasted chicken, caraway carrots, fingerling potatoes, matzo ball soup, chopped liver, and coconut chocolate macaroons.

== History ==
Grunig, a graduate of the San Francisco Baking Institute, worked at Grand Central Bakery before starting his own business—named Standard Bakery—in 2016. Standard Bakery operated from a single location in Pinehurst and was renamed to Zylberschtein's in 2018. It was also converted from a bakery to a Jewish-style deli at this time. The conversion was funded with a $50,000 Kickstarter campaign launched in August 2018.

== Reception ==
Alana Al-Hatlani included the deli in Eater Seattle's 2022 list of "10 Sensational Bagel Shops Around the Seattle Area".

== See also ==
- List of Ashkenazi Jewish restaurants
- List of Jewish delis
