= Rein's Deli =

Deli in Vernon, Connecticut, United States

- Interactive map of Rein's Deli

Restaurant information
- Established: 1972 (54 years ago)
- Owner: Russell DeBella
- Food type: New York-style delicatessen
- Dress code: Casual
- Location: 435 Hartford Turnpike, Vernon, Connecticut, 06066, United States
- Coordinates: 41°49′49″N 72°28′57″W
- Website: Official website

Rein's Deli (officially Rein's New York Style Deli) is a delicatessen at 435 Hartford Turnpike in Vernon, Connecticut, United States. Established in 1972 by Bob and Betty Rein and Bob's brother, Bernie, natives of Elizabeth, New Jersey, it is noted for bringing traditional Jewish deli food to New England. It is a popular stopping point for people traveling between Boston and New York on Interstate 84. The restaurant is owned by Russell DeBella, who began working at the restaurant around 2000 as a 17-year-old bus boy. Bob Rein died in 1988, Betty in 2015.

The restaurant, which won the "best deli" award in the Best of Hartford 2021, was originally located in the El Camino Plaza, on the other side of the Hartford Turnpike, but moved to its current location in 1990 after the plaza burned that May. The business reopened, in a space formerly occupied by an early location of Kathy John's restaurant, just over a week later.

The restaurant is noted for providing its dine-in patrons with a complimentary bowl of pickles at their table.

In 2022, actor William Shatner was seen at the restaurant.

== See also ==
- List of delicatessens
- List of Jewish delis
