= Pastrami on rye =

Classic American deli sandwich

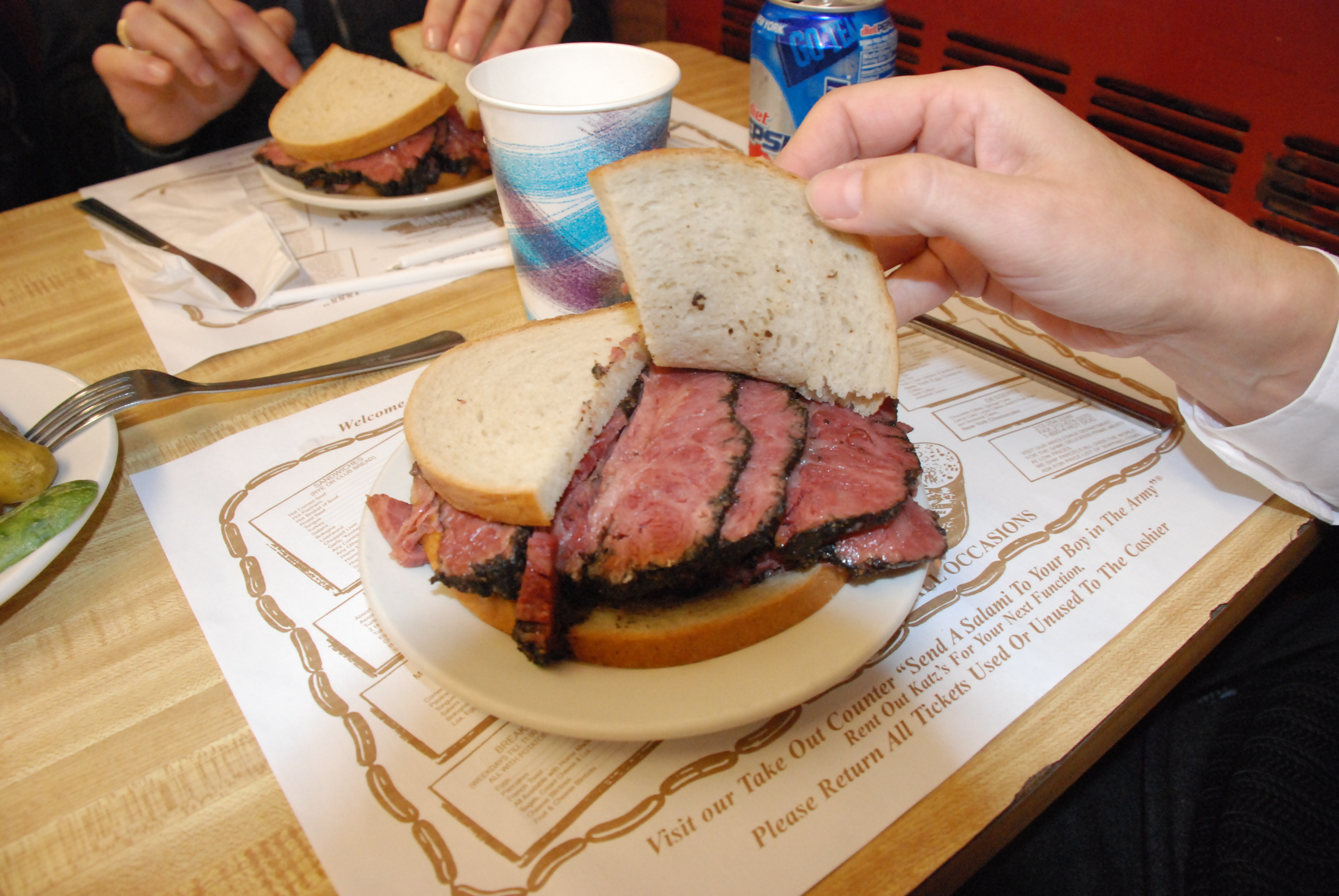
- A pastrami sandwich from Katz's Delicatessen
- Type: Sandwich
- Place of origin: United States
- Region or state: New York City, New York
- Main ingredients: pastrami, rye bread, spicy brown mustard

Pastrami on rye is a sandwich comprising sliced pastrami on rye bread, often served with mustard and Kosher dill pickles. It was popularized in the Jewish delicatessens of New York City and has been described as New York's "signature sandwich". It was created in 1888 by the Lithuanian immigrant Sussman Volk, who served it at his deli on Delancey Street in Manhattan.

== History ==
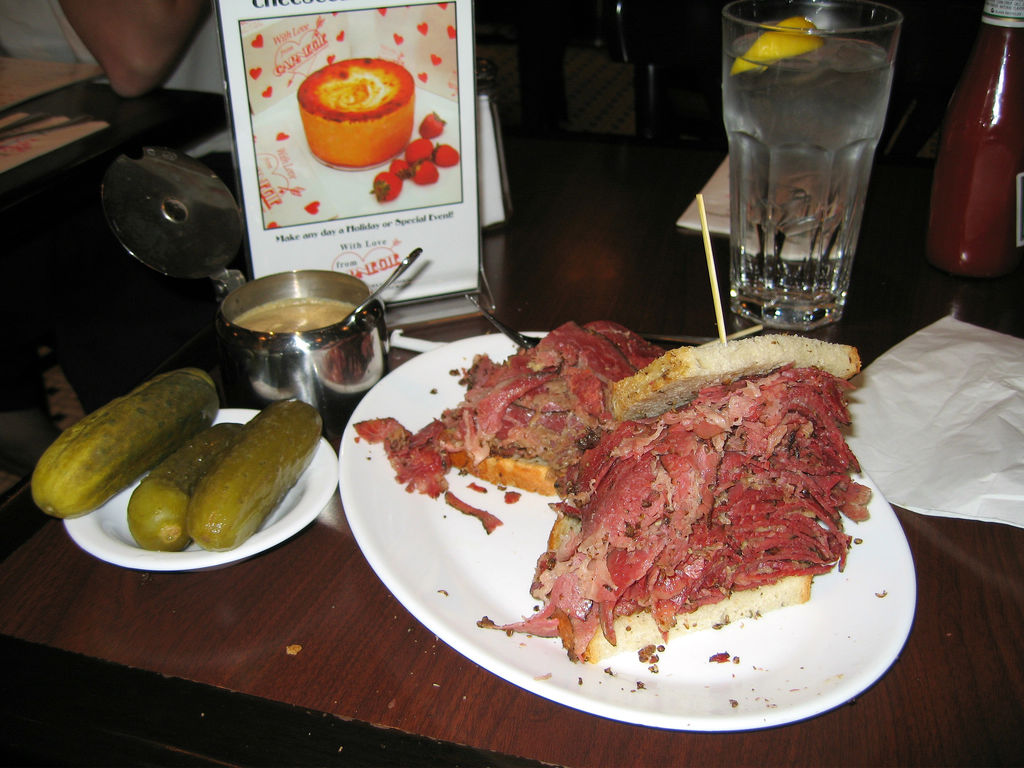
Pastrami on rye, served with the classic accoutrements of spicy brown mustard and Kosher dill pickles.

Sussman Volk emigrated from Lithuania in the late 1800s and opened a small butchershop on New York's Lower East Side. He befriended another immigrant, from Romania, whom he allowed to store meat in his large icebox. In exchange, the friend gave the recipe for pastrami to Volk, who began to serve it to his customers. It proved so popular that, in 1888, Volk opened a delicatessen at 88 Delancey Street, one of the first delis in New York City, where he served the pastrami on rye bread.

The pastrami on rye became a favorite at other delis, topped with spicy brown mustard. Delis in New York City, such as Katz's Delicatessen, have become known for their pastrami on rye sandwiches. In her review of a book on Katz's, Florence Fabricant, the food critic for the New York Times, described the volume "as overstuffed as Katz's pastrami on rye".

The pastrami on rye sandwich is a symbol of the classic New York Jewish deli, featured in delis around the world attempting to recreate the ambience of the original New York delis, in cities such as Los Angeles, Buenos Aires, Boca Raton, Florida, and San Diego, California. The classic, which the Wall Street Journal called New York's "signature sandwich", consists simply of sliced pastrami, placed on rye bread, and topped with spicy brown mustard. It is usually accompanied by a Kosher dill pickle.

== Notable delis and restaurants ==
- Brent's Deli – Northridge, Los Angeles
- Canter's – Fairfax District, Los Angeles
- Stage Deli – Midtown Manhattan
- Sarge's Deli – Murray Hill, Manhattan
- Carnegie Deli – Midtown Manhattan
- Dunn's – Montreal, Quebec
- Katz's Delicatessen – Lower East Side, Manhattan
- Langer's Deli – Westlake, Los Angeles
- Liebman's Deli
- Second Avenue Deli – Murray Hill, Manhattan
- Schwartz's – Montreal, Quebec

== Variations ==
Corned beef and pastrami on rye may be prepared using rye bread, pastrami, corned beef, cole slaw, and Russian dressing. Preparation involves placing both meats on a slice of rye bread and topping it with coleslaw. Russian dressing may be added to the top slice of bread.

Pastrami, lettuce, and tomato (PLT) may be prepared using two slices of toasted sourdough bread, mayonnaise, pastrami, lettuce, tomato slices. Preparation involves placing the pastrami on a toasted slice of sourdough bread and topping it with the lettuce and tomato slices. Mayonnaise may be spread on the second slice of sourdough, and placed on top of the sandwich.

Delicatessen establishments in Montreal offer a similar sandwich with rye bread and mustard, although with Montreal-style smoked meat instead of pastrami.

== See also ==
- American Jewish cuisine
- List of American sandwiches
- List of sandwiches
- Montreal-style smoked meat
- Reuben sandwich
- Roast beef sandwich
- Sailor sandwich, which also combines pastrami and rye bread
