= Underground Overground Comedy =

New York City-based comedy production company

Underground Overground Comedy, also known as ComedyUO, is a New York City-based live entertainment company that produces pop-up comedy shows in unconventional venues. Founded in 2021 by David Levine and Ethan Mansoor, the company temporarily converts operating businesses, cultural institutions, and New York landmarks into live performance spaces featuring unannounced comedian lineups.

The company has since produced comedy shows at iconic New York institutions and landmarks including Katz's Delicatessen, Paragon Sports, and the Empire State Building. Levine and Mansoor signed with WME in 2025, and in 2026 expanded the concept through Underground Overground Magic, a series of pop-up magic and variety shows staged in similarly unconventional locations.

== History ==
Underground Overground Comedy was founded in New York City in 2021 by David Levine and Ethan Mansoor, childhood friends who grew up in the city. The two developed the concept during the COVID-19 pandemic. Levine had previously performed stand-up comedy while attending Syracuse University, and both were regular attendees of New York comedy shows.

The company was established around producing stand-up comedy outside traditional comedy clubs, using operating businesses and other nontraditional spaces as temporary venues. Early performances were held in locations including a gym, laundromat, rooftop, music studio, barbershop and retail stores. The company initially promoted its shows primarily through social media, using undisclosed lineups and a waitlist-based ticketing model.

Underground Overground expanded from smaller pop-up performances to larger productions during its first several years. By 2022, it had produced dozens of shows across New York City. A 2022 show at Katz's Delicatessen sold out, and the company subsequently returned to the venue for additional productions. In 2025, Levine and Mansoor signed with talent agency William Morris Endeavor (WME). That year, the company also expanded into recorded comedy, producing 10-minute stand-up sets for digital distribution.

In 2026, Levine and Mansoor expanded the Underground Overground concept beyond stand-up comedy with the launch of Underground Overground Magic, a series centered on live magic performances in unconventional locations.

== Format ==
Underground Overground produces one-night pop-up comedy shows in spaces that do not ordinarily operate as comedy venues. Past locations have included laundromats, restaurants, retail stores, rooftops and music studios, as well as larger New York venues and landmarks including Katz's Delicatessen and the Empire State Building. Rather than operating a permanent comedy club, the company temporarily rearranges or converts each location into a live performance space.

Underground Overground uses a secret-lineup format, in which the comedians are not announced before the event. The company initially promoted performances through social media and maintained a waitlist for upcoming events. The undisclosed-lineup format continued as the company expanded to larger productions.
