= Loeser's Deli =

Jewish deli in New York City (1960–2019)

Coordinates: 40°52′45″N 73°54′20″W

Loeser's Deli was a Jewish deli in The Bronx, New York, that closed in 2019, after 60 years, citing a non-compliant gas line. Founded in 1960 by Freddy Loeser and Ernest his father, a Holocaust survivor, their origin story is that they used Freddy's Bar Mitzvah money to open the business. The corner of West 231st St and Godwin Terrace, was renamed Loeser's Deli Place by the city in honor of the deli. The city found issues with their health regulations and their plumbing, leading to the shutdown of the operation. They were known for knishes and pastrami.

== See also ==
- List of Ashkenazi Jewish restaurants
- List of delicatessens
- List of Jewish delis
