= Gaby's Deli =

Jewish restaurant

- Gaby Elyahou (left) in front of the restaurant

- Location within Central London

Restaurant information
- Established: 1965
- Closed: 31 October 2018
- Owner: Gaby Elyahou
- Food type: Jewish
- Location: 30 Charing Cross Road, London
- Coordinates: 51.5107032°N 0.1277289°W

Gaby's Deli was a Jewish restaurant in London's Charing Cross Road founded by an Iraqi refugee, Gaby Elyahou, who ran it with his family.

It served fresh salads and hot comfort food such as goulash. It was especially noted for its salt beef and falafel. After the landlord decided not to extend the lease in 2011, a campaign including celebrities and politicians led to the decisions reversal. The restaurant closed in 2018 following Elyahou's retirement.

== History ==
It was founded in 1965 by an Iraqi refugee, Gaby Elyahou, who took over an existing salt beef bar. Gaby chose to continue serving salt beef, later saying he thought it made the best sandwich. He introduced espresso coffee and many varieties of salad. Mediterranean dishes such as hummus and tahini were served and Gaby claimed to have introduced falafels to London. Other dishes included goulash, meatballs and soup.

The Jewish deli was popular with theatrical celebrities due to its location in London's Theatreland district, and the speed of service and perceived tastiness of food. Charlie Chaplin was a regular, and the restaurant was also popular with left-wing politicians such as Ken Livingstone and Jeremy Corbyn.

The landlord was Lord Salisbury through the property company, Gascoyne Holdings. In 2011, Gascoyne Holdings communicated they would not extend the lease. Following a campaign from celebrities from theatre and politics including Boris Johnson, Jeremy Corbyn, Miriam Margolyes and Vanessa Redgrave, the decision was reversed.

Gaby retired in 2018 and the restaurant was closed by his nephew, after determining that it could not compete against fast food chains. Its last night was 31 October, and final patrons included local Labour MP Barbara Roche, who had visited since her childhood.

== References in Fiction ==
Jeremy Cooper has his eponymous character Brian from his 2023 book Brian eat at Gaby's:

...they walked down the road towards Trafalgar Square to take tea and apple cake at Gaby's...once seated at a table in the small deli they showed each other what they had bought, Brian laying out on the scrubbed Formica the five postcards of old picture houses...

— Jeremy Cooper, Brian, p. 153

== Reception ==
Matthew Norman reviewed the restaurant for The Daily Telegraph, giving it a rating of 9 out of 10. The dishes which he praised included bean and barley soup, chicken livers fried with onions, and a spinach salad. His party then ordered more food and he especially praised the salt beef:

Kleftiko with lukewarm chips and Hungarian goulash with excellent saffron rice were fine winter warmers, but the clear highlight was my salt beef in rye bread with sweet and sour pickles. The beef was plentiful, juicy and just as fatty as it should be. Lean salt beef is, as my mother puts it, like having a bath with your socks on. With its bustle, warmth and earthy charm, Gaby's is our best answer to the great New York delis such as the Carnegie...

— Matthew Norman, The Daily Telegraph, 27 January 2012

== Gallery ==
Prepared dishes on display in the window

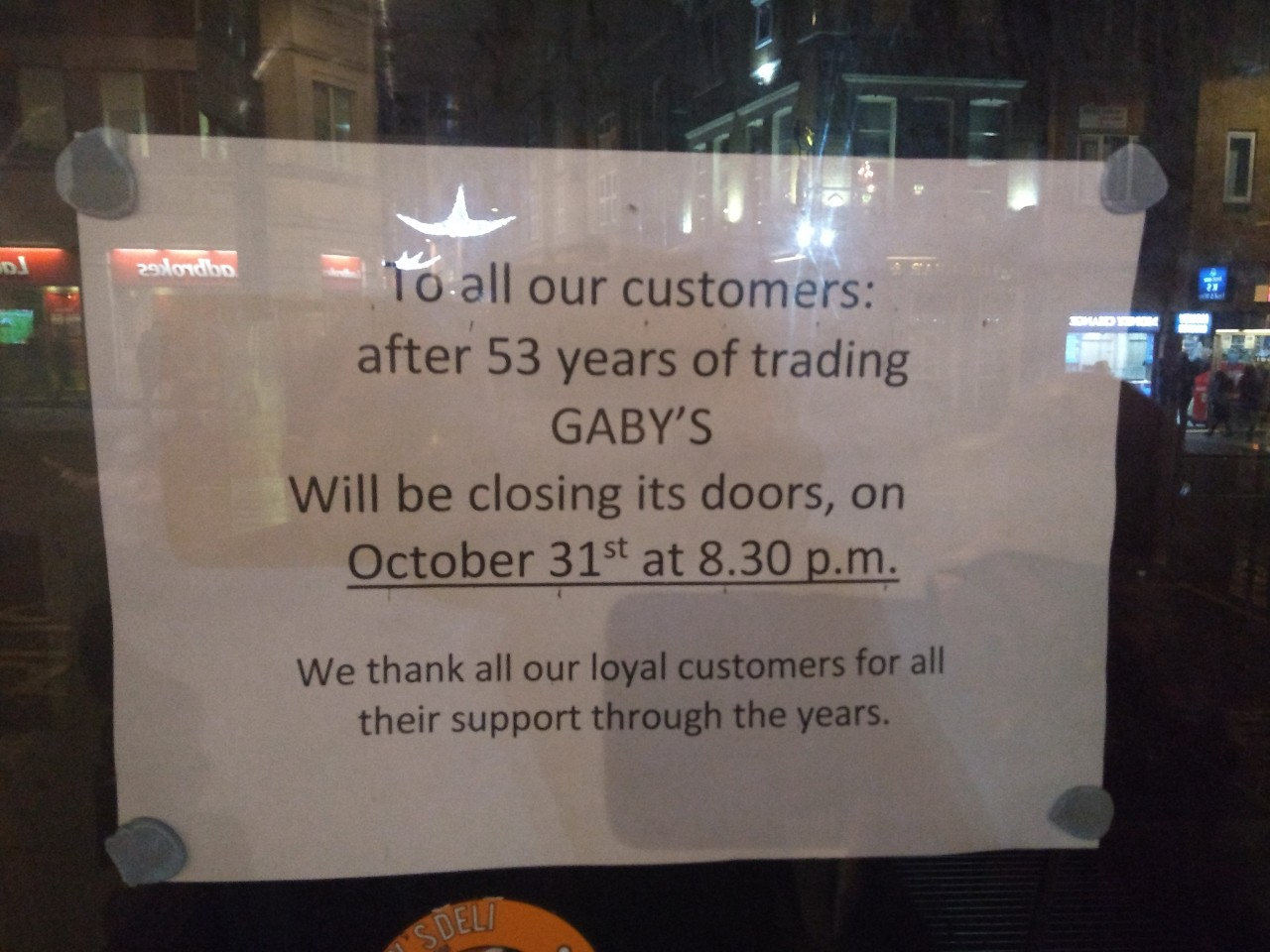
Closure notice

== See also ==
- List of Ashkenazi Jewish restaurants
- List of Jewish delicatessens
- List of restaurants in London
- At Gaby's Deli by Jenny Linford on the Gentle Author's Spitalfields Life website
