= Kornblatt's Delicatessen =

Jewish deli in Portland, Oregon, U.S.

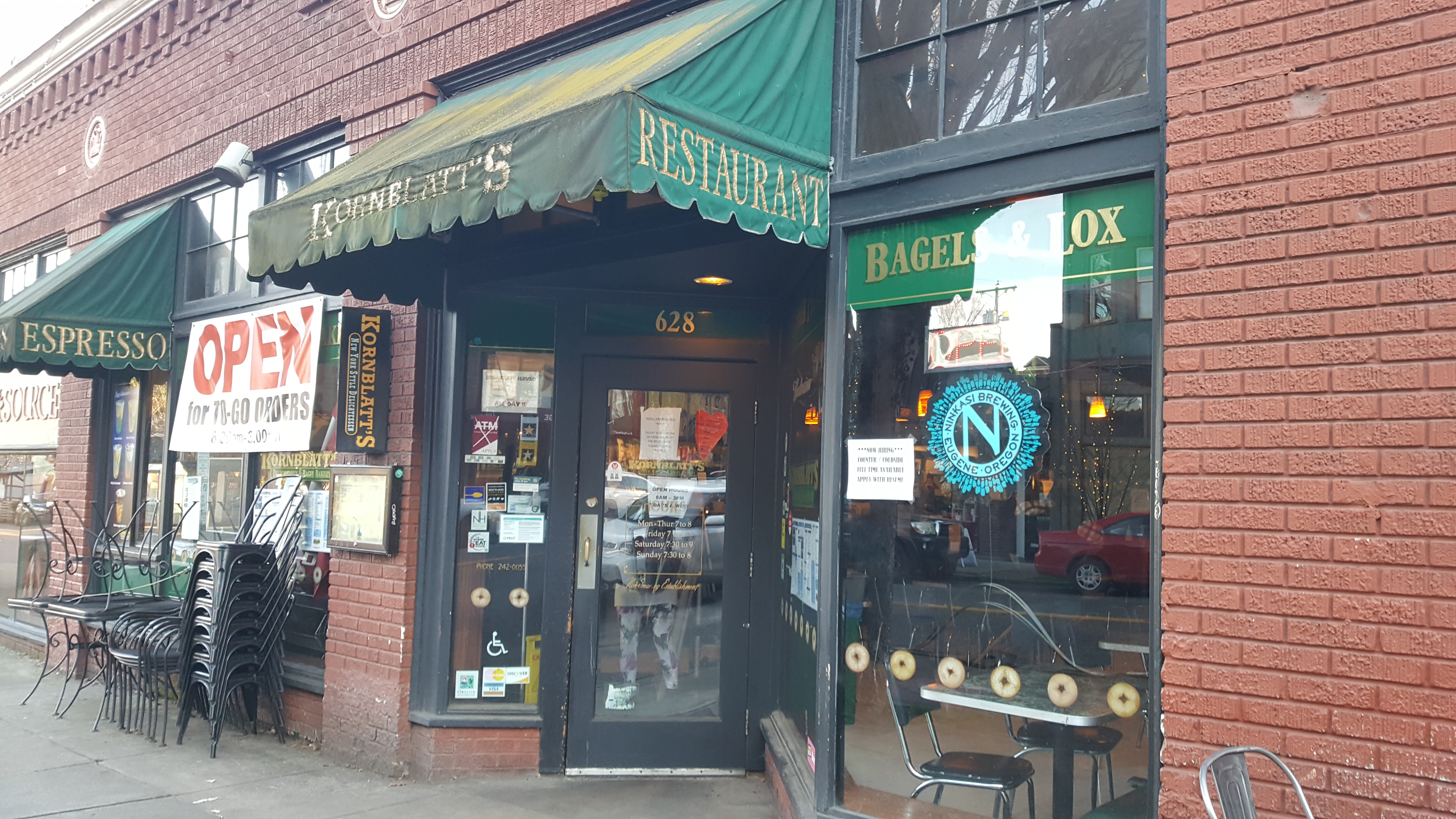
- The restaurant's exterior in 2022
- Interactive map of Kornblatt's Delicatessen

Restaurant information
- Established: 1991
- Closed: March 2023
- Location: 628 Northwest 23rd Avenue, Portland, Multnomah, Oregon, 97210, United States
- Coordinates: 45.5274°N 122.6984°W
- Website: kornblattsdelipdx.com

Kornblatt's Delicatessen was a Jewish deli in Portland, Oregon. The business operated from 1991 to March 2023.

== Description ==
Kornblatt's Delicatessen was a Jewish deli with a "spacious, relaxed" dining room in northwest Portland's Northwest District. The exterior had a brick facade and a green awning. The breakfast menu included bagels with lox, blintzes, hashes, and omelettes, and lunch options included corned beef and Reuben sandwiches, latkes, and Matzo ball soup. The delicatessen was not considered kosher and many menu options include dairy and meat. The business served organic chicken basil sausage, knishes, kugel, macaroni salad, and smoked fish. Kornblatt's offered a dozen sandwiches, as of 2016, including eight Reubens, beef tongue, chopped liver and egg salad, French dip with au jus, and hoagies. Bagels were boiled daily and fish were imported from the East Coast weekly. Hebrew National supplied beef hot dogs and salami. Thumann's Deli also supplied meats.

== History ==
Kornblatt's was established in 1991. Mike Heffernan was an owner. John Callahan frequented the deli, as of 2006.

In 2021, for Hanukkah, the deli offered take-home platters. The Long Island Sound platter had smoked fish with assorted bagels and schmears.

In March 2023, the business announced plans to close at the end of the month. Henry Higgins Boiled Bagels purchased the location and opened on May 15.

== Reception ==
In 2008, Douglas Perry of The Oregonian said of the restaurant's latkes: "The most authentic version is at Kornblatt's, where it comes out gnarly on the edges and soul satisfyingly soft inside." In 2011, T magazine's Jordan Michelman said Kornblatt's was "one of the truly great New York delis outside the five boroughs" and wrote, "this displaced ode to New York deli counter culture strives for authenticity (Nova lox, pickles and meats imported from New York City), and yet it can't help but reflect the differences between Manhattan and Portland". The Oregonian's Lizzy Acker ranked Kornblatt's number 14 on a 2019 list of Portland's top 25 corned beef hashes. She wrote, "Kornblatt’s makes you feel comfortable. It's a place with regulars, and a fine spot." Daniel Barnett and Brooke Jackson-Glidden included Kornblatt's in Eater Portland's 2021 list of "8 Real-Deal Bagel Shops in Portland". The duo described Kornblatt's as "a quintessential East Coast-style" deli and recommended the nova lox and cream cheese bagel, as well as the house whitefish and the sun-dried tomato and basil schmear as bagel toppings.

== See also ==
- List of Ashkenazi Jewish restaurants
- List of Jewish delis
