= Henry Higgins Boiled Bagels =

Restaurant chain in Portland, Oregon, U.S.

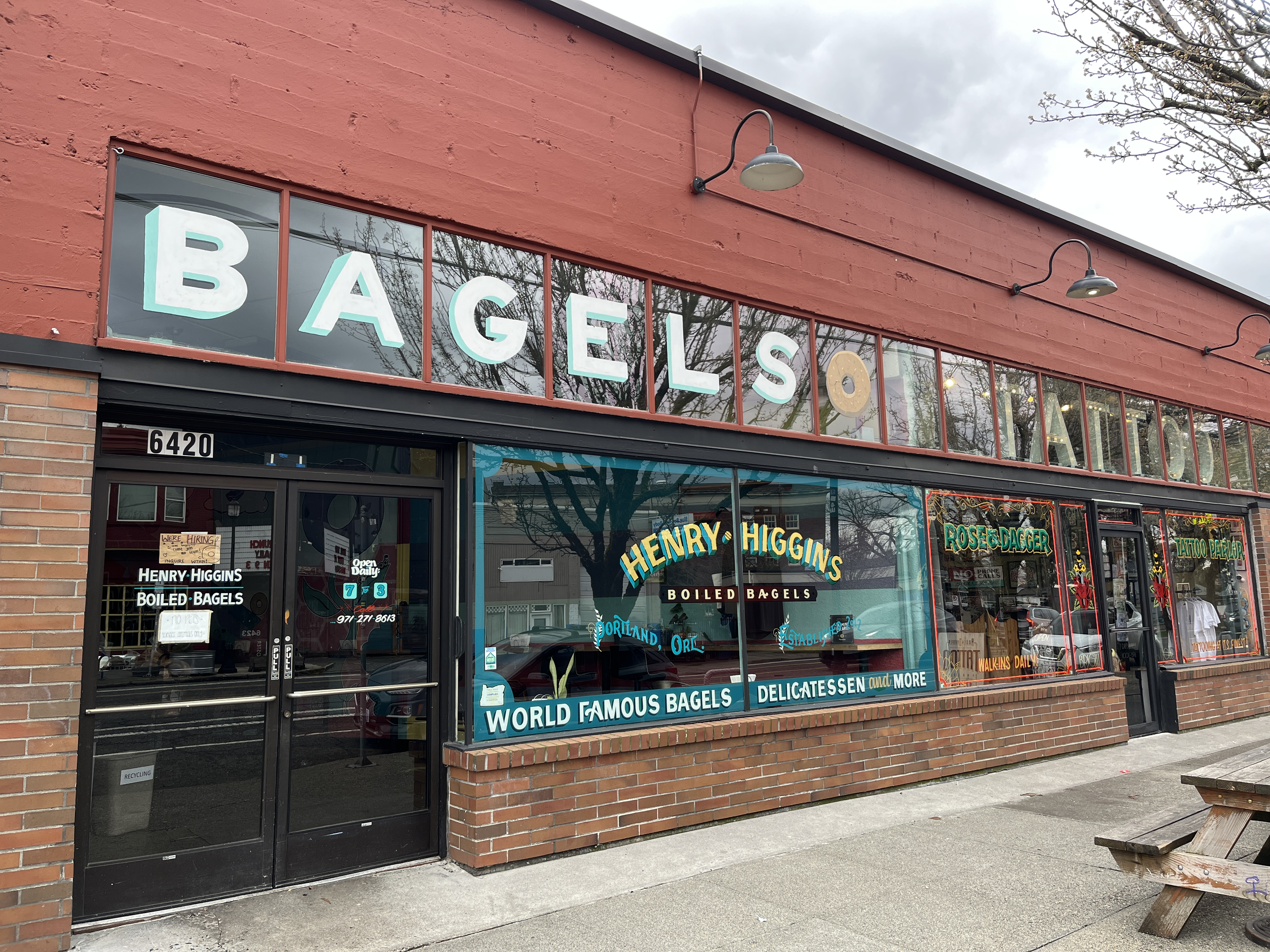
- Exterior of the shop in Southeast Portland's Mt. Scott-Arleta neighborhood in 2025

Restaurant information
- Established: 2013
- Owner: Leah Orndoff
- Location: Portland, Multnomah, Oregon, United States
- Website: hhboiledbagels.com

Henry Higgins Boiled Bagels is a small chain of bagel shops in Portland, Oregon, United States. The business was established by Leah Orndoff in 2013 and initially operated as a pop-up, at farmers' markets, and via wholesale. Since opening the first brick and mortar shop in Southeast Portland's Mt. Scott-Arleta neighborhood in 2013, Henry Higgins has expanded to four locations. The business also has shops in the Northeast Portland part of the Kerns neighborhood, in Southeast Portland's Sellwood-Moreland neighborhood, and in Northwest Portland's Northwest District.

Henry Higgins serves various varieties of New York-style bagels, as well as schmears, sandwiches, sides such as chopped liver and pickled herring, and baked goods such as bialys, knishes, and rugelach. The business has garnered a positive reception and was selected to represent Oregon in Eat This, Not That's 2022 list of the best bagels in each U.S. state.

== Description ==
Henry Higgins Boiled Bagels is a small chain of bagel shops in Portland, Oregon; there are four locations, in Southeast Portland's Mt. Scott-Arleta and Sellwood-Moreland neighborhoods, in the Northeast Portland part of the Kerns neighborhood, and in Northwest Portland's Northwest District. According to KOIN, the company's mission is to "provide Portland with a traditional NY style boiled bagel". Among boiled bagel varieties are everything, onion, and pumpernickel. Bagel toppings include such as schmears, cream cheese, and fish. The menu also has sandwiches (including hot and cold bagel sandwiches), deli sides such as chopped liver and pickled herring, and baked goods such as bialys, knishes, and rugelach. Other sandwich ingredients include capers, dill, lox, red onion, and tomato. Drink options include coffee, tea, and hot chocolate.

== History ==
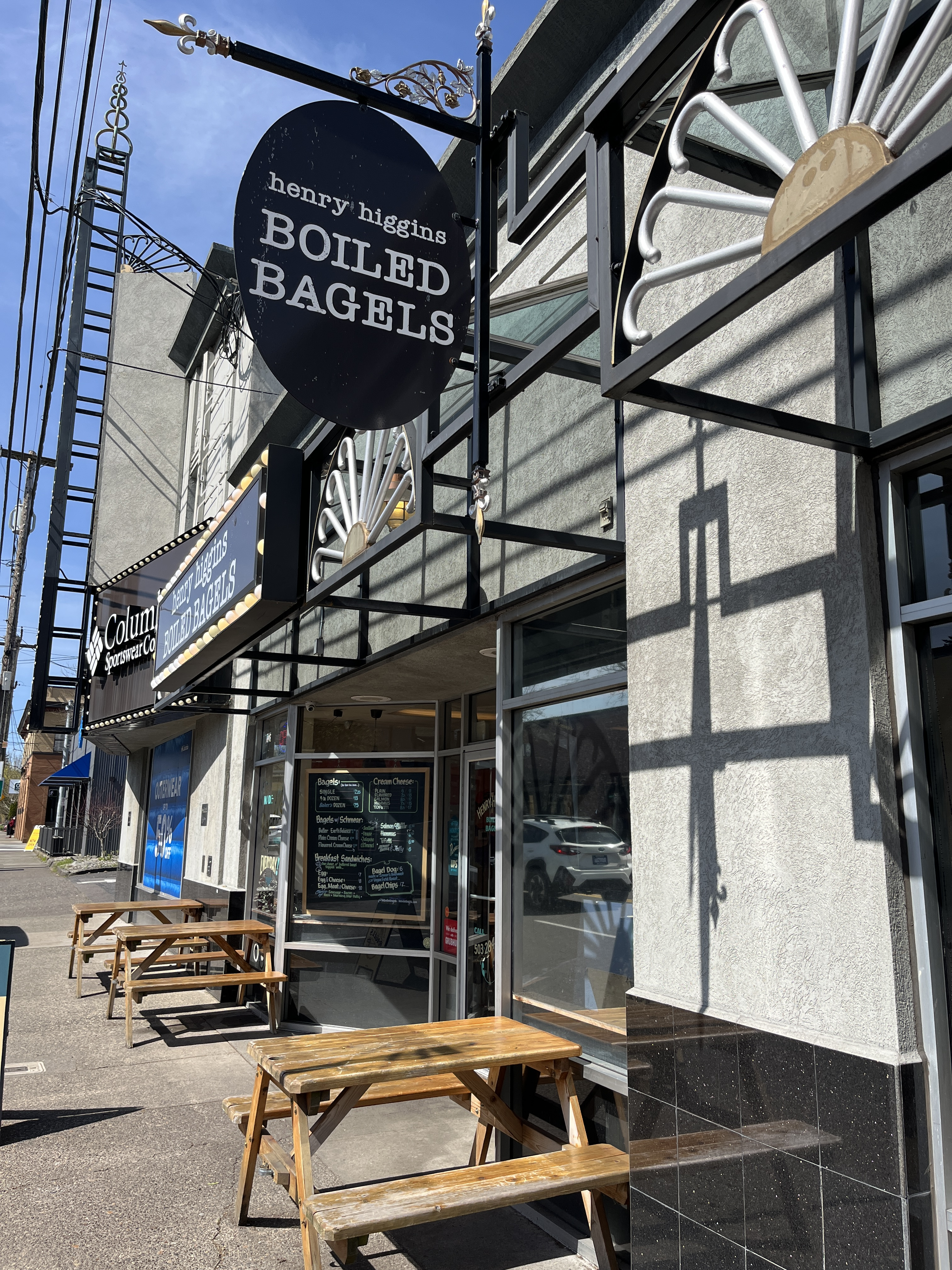
Exterior of the shop in Sellwood-Moreland in 2025

Leah Orndoff started the business in 2013, initially operating as a pop-up, at farmers' markets, and via wholesale. The first brick and mortar shop opened at the intersection of Foster Road and 64th Avenue in Mt. Scott-Arleta (near Foster-Powell) in May 2015. The shop had a seating capacity of 14 people, rotating artwork as well as mugs by ceramicist Cooper Jeppesen, and served coffee from Mudd Works.

Henry Higgins has also operated a bakery on Northeast 19th Avenue, in Kerns. In 2018, the business announced plans to open a third location on Tacoma Street in Sellwood-Moreland, in the space previously occupied by Feastworks Delicatessen. The shop opened on March 17, with a seating capacity of approximately 25 people. In 2020, during the COVID-19 pandemic, Henry Higgins operated via delivery services like bicycle-based CCC as well as Caviar and Grubhub. Henry Higgins also sold groceries using these services. The business expanded weekend hours in mid 2021, hosting "After Hours with Henry Higgins". In 2023, Henry Higgins purchased the space previously occupied by Kornblatt's Delicatessen in the Northwest District. The shop opened on May 15.

Dave Barile has been the head chef. Henry Higgins has used flour from Shepard's Grain and flour and seeds from Bob's Red Mill. The business has been a vendor at community events, such as a Hanukkah food pop-up in 2022 and the Hanukkah Night Market at Eastside Jewish Commons in 2023.

== Reception ==
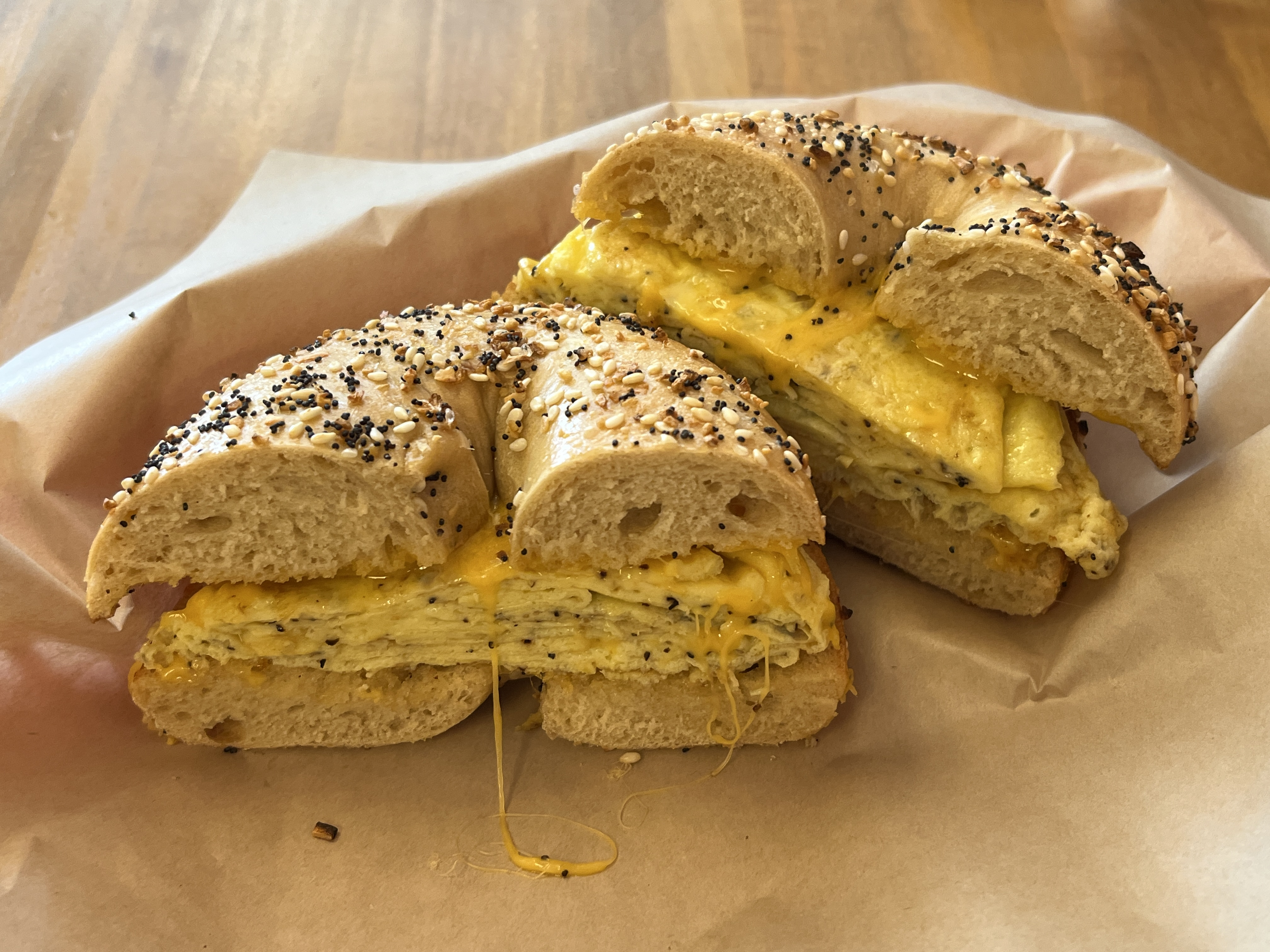
Egg and cheese breakfast sandwich with an everything bagel

Henry Higgins ranked second in the Best Bagel category of Willamette Week's annual readers' poll in 2020. It won in the same category in 2024, 2025, and 2026. Tanya Edwards selected the business to represent Oregon in Eat This, Not That's 2022 overview of the best bagels in each U.S. state. In a 2023 review of the smoked salmon bagel sandwich, Meira Gebel of Axios Portland wrote:

The smoked salmon was lovely and salty, complemented by the creaminess of a thick smear of cream cheese and the citrus of squeezed lemon. The herbs and veggies provided a hit of cool freshness... My only note is that the sandwich didn't want to stay together. It kept slipping, but I happily continued to compile the pieces into perfect bites.

Gebel also said, "Boiled bagels are a classic New York tradition, and at Henry Higgins, you can grab one without getting on a plane." In the first Portland Bagel-Off organized by Jacob & Sons Deli in 2023, Henry Higgins won the People's Choice award. Daniel Barnett, Brooke Jackson-Glidden, and Nathan Williams included the business in Eater Portland's 2024 list of ten "real-deal" bagel shops in the city.
