= Liebman's Deli =

Kosher Jewish deli in Riverdale, in Riverdale, Bronx, New York

Liebman's Delicatessen
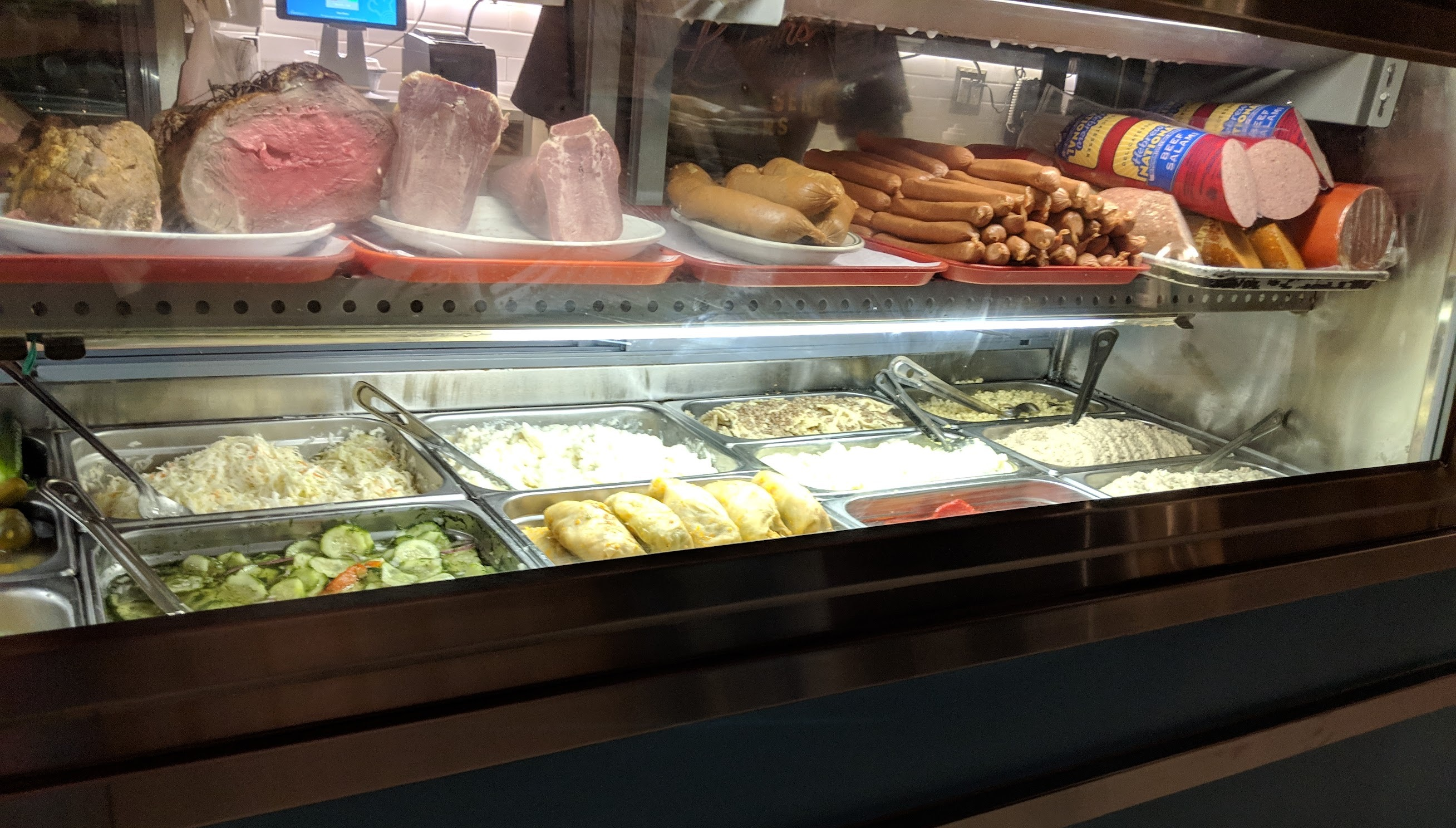
- Interactive map of Liebman's Delicatessen

Restaurant information
- Food type: Jewish deli
- Dress code: Casual
- Location: 552 W 235th St, Bronx, New York, 10463, United States
- Coordinates: 40°53′08″N 73°54′35″W
- Website: Official website

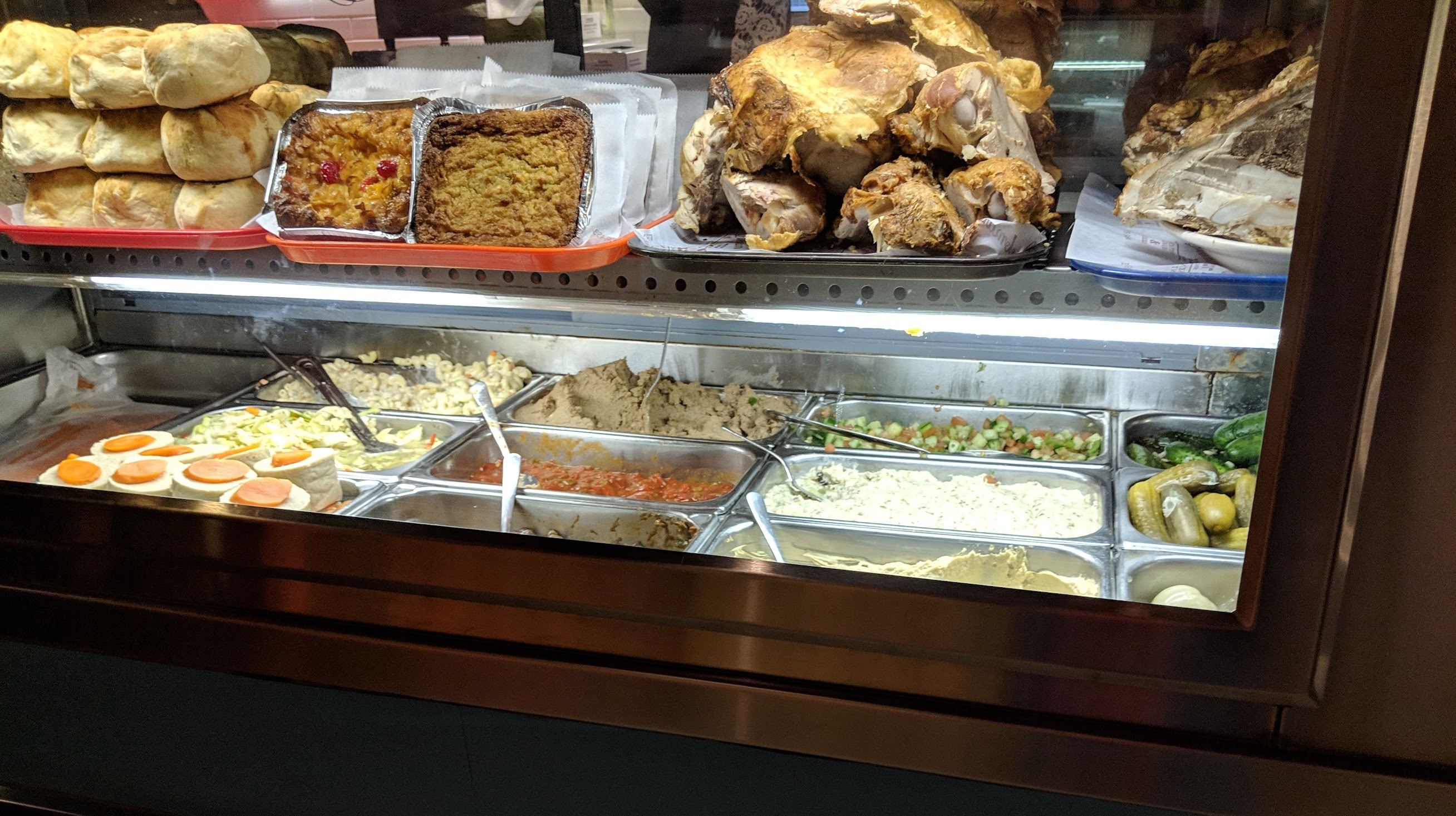
Knishes, pickles, chopped liver, noodle kugel and turkey meat

Liebman's Deli is a Jewish deli in Riverdale, New York and is the last-standing kosher deli in the Bronx. It was one of hundreds of kosher delis in the Bronx when it opened, but now is the sole representative of that cuisine in the borough. Liebman's was founded in 1953 by Joe Liebman and sold to Joseph Dekel in 1980. Yuval Dekel, his son, took over in 2002 when his father died. Dekel was previously a heavy metal drummer in a band, but now makes the pastrami and supervises the operation, along with his wife whom he met at the restaurant and now works there. The restaurant has opened a second location in Ardsley, New York. Liebman's is rated by Zagat and Michelin Guide. It was covered by Anthony Bourdain for Parts Unknown. Liebman's is noted for their matzo ball soup and house-made pastrami, and Jewish delicacies such as stuffed derma, knishes, pickles, as well as kosher wine. It is frequented by Jewish New York Mets player Harrison Bader, who grew up in nearby Bronxville, New York.

== See also ==
- List of Ashkenazi Jewish restaurants
- List of delicatessens
- List of Jewish delis
