= Sarge's Deli =

Restaurant in Manhattan, New York

Sarge's Delicatessen & Diner
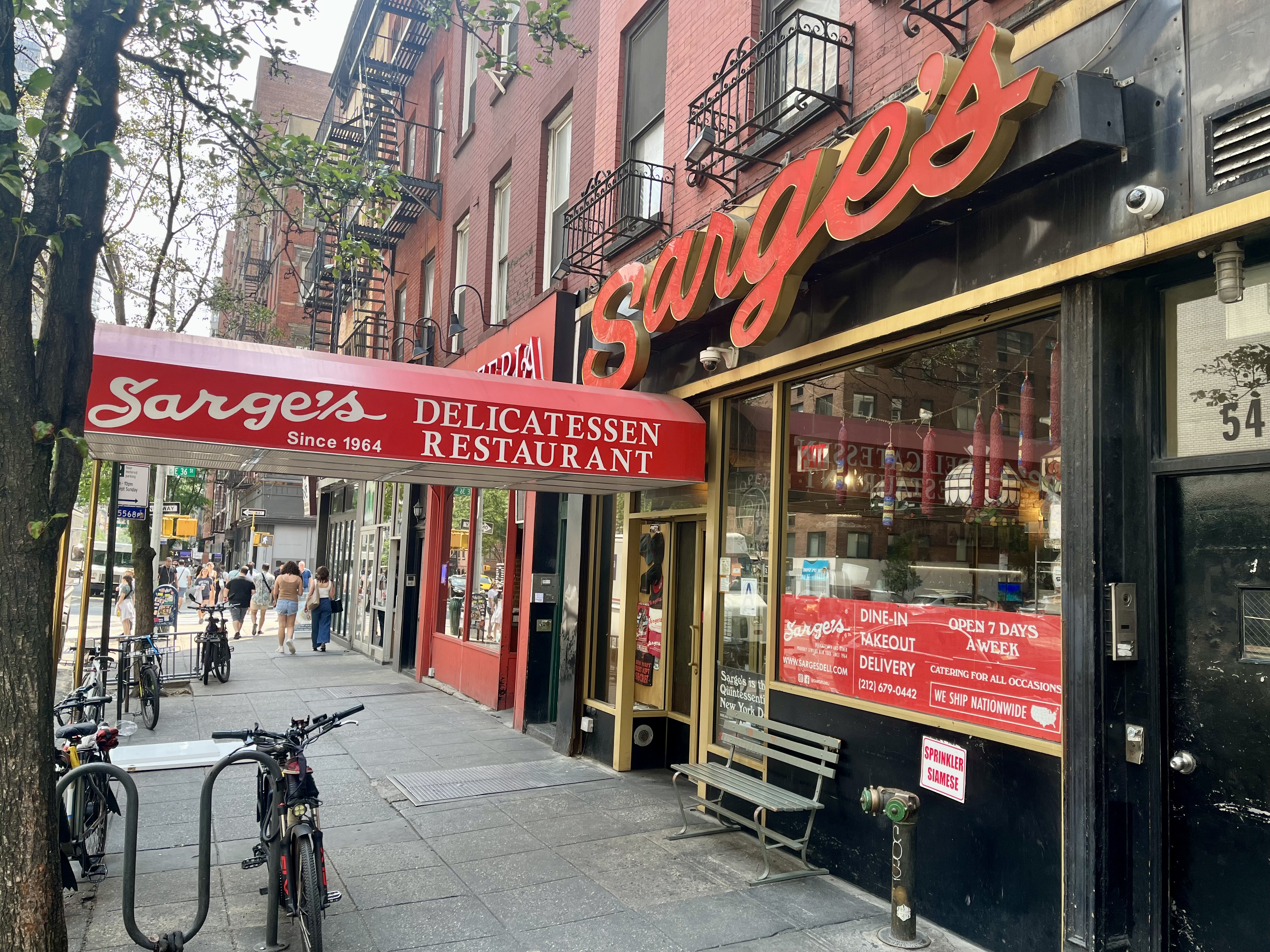
- Sarge's Deli in 2023
- Interactive map of Sarge's Delicatessen & Diner

Restaurant information
- Established: 1964
- Location: 548 Third Avenue, New York, New York, 10016, United States
- Coordinates: 40°44′50.5″N 73°58′38″W

Sarge's Delicatessen & Diner is a Jewish deli and kosher style restaurant in Manhattan. It was opened in 1964, on Third Avenue in Murray Hill, by Abe Katz, a retired New York City Police Department sergeant. Eater NY named it one of the 19 Vital Jewish Delis in NYC.

Sarge’s has New York City’s largest sandwich, called The Monster. It is made with pastrami, corned beef, roast beef, roast turkey, salami, lettuce, tomatoes, and Russian dressing. It is one of only a few delis in the United States that makes rolled beef.

Sarge's is one of the few delis in New York City to make its own pastrami.

After a 2012 three-alarm grease fire, the restaurant was closed until 2014 for 15 months. Andrew Wengrover, a fourth-generation owner, oversaw the reopening.

Sarge's appeared in Season 8 and Season 11 of the Food Paradise television series, which aired in 2016 and 2017, respectively. The restaurant also served as the filming location for the 1990 documentary film My Dinner With Abbie starring Abbie Hoffman.

== See also ==
- List of Ashkenazi Jewish restaurants
