= Baron Von Fancy =

American fashion designer

Gordon Stevenson, known as Baron Von Fancy for certain artistic and commercial purposes, is a multimedia artist who lives and works in New York City.

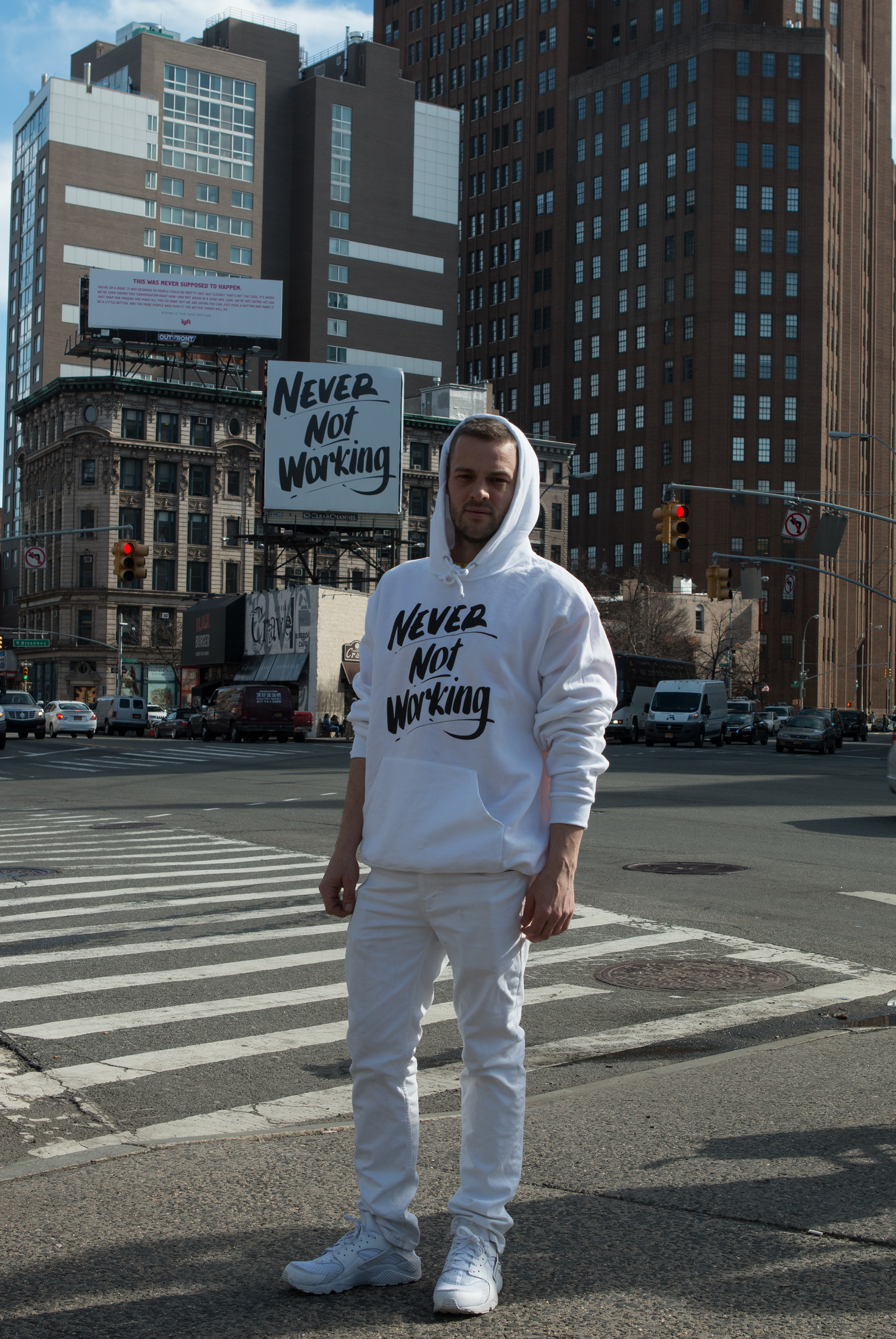
Baron Von Fancy in New York City in 2016

== Background ==
Baron Von Fancy was born in New York City and attended Columbia Grammar and Preparatory School. He earned his Bachelor of Fine Arts from Bard College in 2006. Gordon Stevenson identifies himself by his birth name for his artwork displayed in galleries, and he uses the pseudonym "Baron Von Fancy" to sign his work used for commercial products. For example, his lighters are signed Baron Von Fancy, whereas his paintings are signed with his birth name.

== Work ==
Baron Von Fancy works in various media in addition to canvas. He has created items such as sponges, doormats, socks, backpacks, lighters, bow ties, matchboxes, handbags, cell phone cases and shirts.

=== Collaborations ===
Von Fancy has collaborated with fashion, cosmetics and sportswear brands.

The mobile phone accessory company Incipio launched a line of iPhone cases featuring Baron's art in December 2017.

On January 1, 2016, Vans launched a collections of sneakers featuring Baron Von Fancy's designs.

=== Billboards and public work ===
For the past five years, Baron Von Fancy has created billboards in the SoHo neighborhood and elsewhere in New York City.

Murals with some of Baron Von Fancy's phrases were shown in Paris at Colette, in "A Thing Called Love," a show that opened in February 2013.

=== Exhibitions and multimedia art ===
His work has been displayed in France and in the United States.

Colette invited Baron Von Fancy to create "A Thing Called Love," a show held at their flagship location in Paris and featured a range of his artwork.

=== Origin of the name ===
In an interview with Vanity Fair, Baron Von Fancy has said that his artistic name evolved from his college nickname "Fancy-pants," which itself had originated from his collection of vintage Versace jeans.

=== Phrases ===
A hallmark of Baron Von Fancy's style is the use of common, English language phrases. Critics have described these phrases as "poignant," "playful," "clever," "bold," "poetic," and "reminiscent of the classic, hand-painted billboards that populated New York in the 1950s and 1960s."
