= Manny's Deli =

Delicatessen in Chicago, IL USA

Manny's Cafeteria and Delicatessen
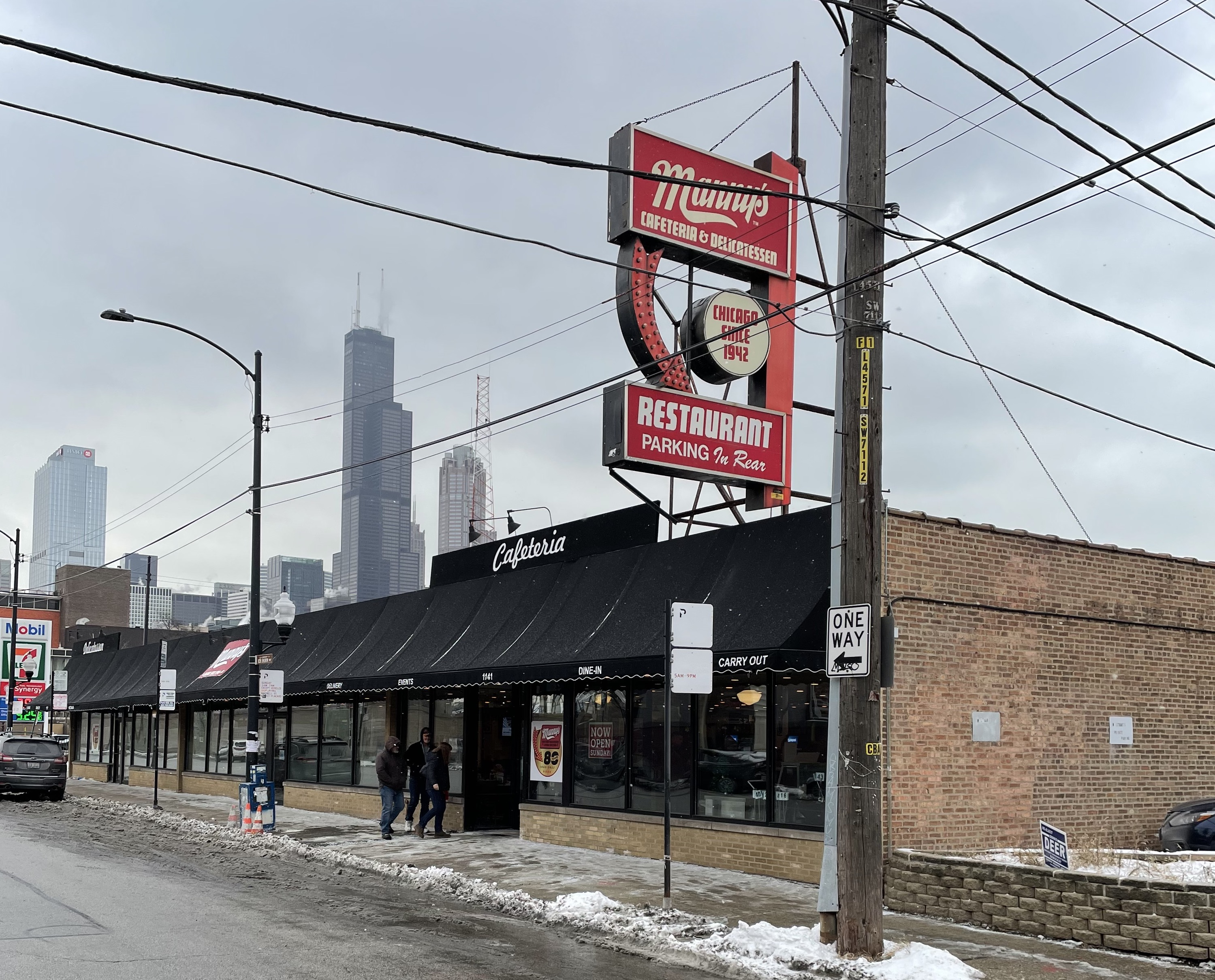
- Exterior of Manny's Deli, taken from Jefferson Street
- Interactive map of Manny's Cafeteria and Delicatessen

Restaurant information
- Established: 1942
- Owner: Ken Raskin
- Food type: Delicatessen
- Location: 1141 South Jefferson Street, Chicago, Cook County, Illinois, 60607, United States
- Coordinates: 41.8679°N 87.6419°W
- Website: http://www.mannysdeli.com/

Manny's Cafeteria and Delicatessen, commonly known as Manny's Deli and sometimes known as Manny's Coffee Shop & Deli, is a delicatessen in Chicago, Illinois, United States, located in the Near West Side community area. It has been described as "the biggest, best-known, and oldest deli in the city". The deli has long been a meeting place for Chicago politicians and became the subject of national interest because of its popularity with President Barack Obama. One writer called Manny's "the second-most-likely place to see local politicians, after City Hall", and former governor George Ryan referred to it in his memoir as "one of my favorite places to eat lunch in Chicago" and reminisced about once receiving a phone call from Nelson Mandela while eating a corned beef sandwich there.

== History ==
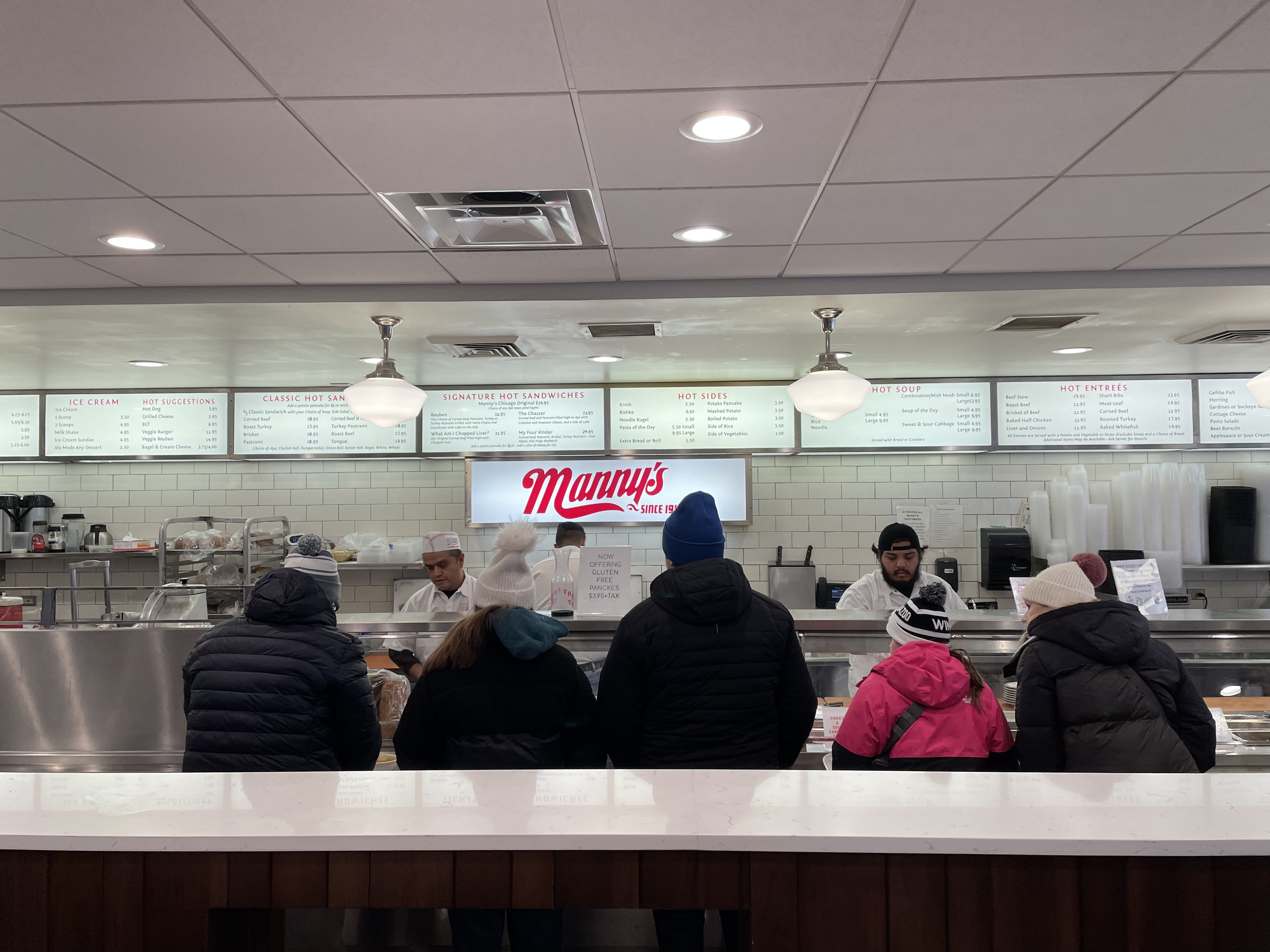
Ordering at the counter

Manny's traces its history back to 1942, when the Raskin brothers, Jack and Charlie, went into business together in Chicago, opening the Purity deli located at Van Buren and Halsted streets. After World War II, Jack Raskin opened his own restaurant on Roosevelt Road near Maxwell Street, where he purchased a business known as Sunny's. To save money, Raskin chose to name his new restaurant "Manny's" after his son Emanuel, known as Manny, thereby requiring only two letters on the "Sunny's" sign to be replaced.

The restaurant had various locations over the ensuing years, with Manny Raskin eventually taking over for his father, Jack. Manny Raskin moved the cafeteria to its current location at 1141 South Jefferson Street in 1964. Manny Raskin's son Kenneth began managing the restaurant during his father's lifetime and continued to do so after his father died in 1983. It is now run by Ken Raskin and Ken's son Dan. It has moved multiple times through the years, and was renovated in 2016. The restaurant celebrated its 80th anniversary in 2022 with Governor J. B. Pritzker in attendance.

In 2002, a Manny's location was opened at Midway International Airport, but it closed in 2017 when many of the airport's restaurants were replaced.

During the COVID-19 pandemic, Manny's gave away 1,000 free sandwiches to customers wearing masks.

In 2022, Manny's began making some of its food available for nationwide shipping.

In August 2018, Manny's was featured in an episode of Diners, Drive-Ins and Dives; the show revisited Manny's in a Triple D Nation episode that aired in April 2026.

== Cuisine ==
Manny's is self-described as a "Jewish-style cafeteria", although it is not kosher. Among the foods it is known for are corned beef sandwiches, pastrami sandwiches, potato pancakes, and matzo ball soup.

== See also ==
- List of Ashkenazi Jewish restaurants
