= Katz's Delicatessen =

Jewish deli in Manhattan, New York City

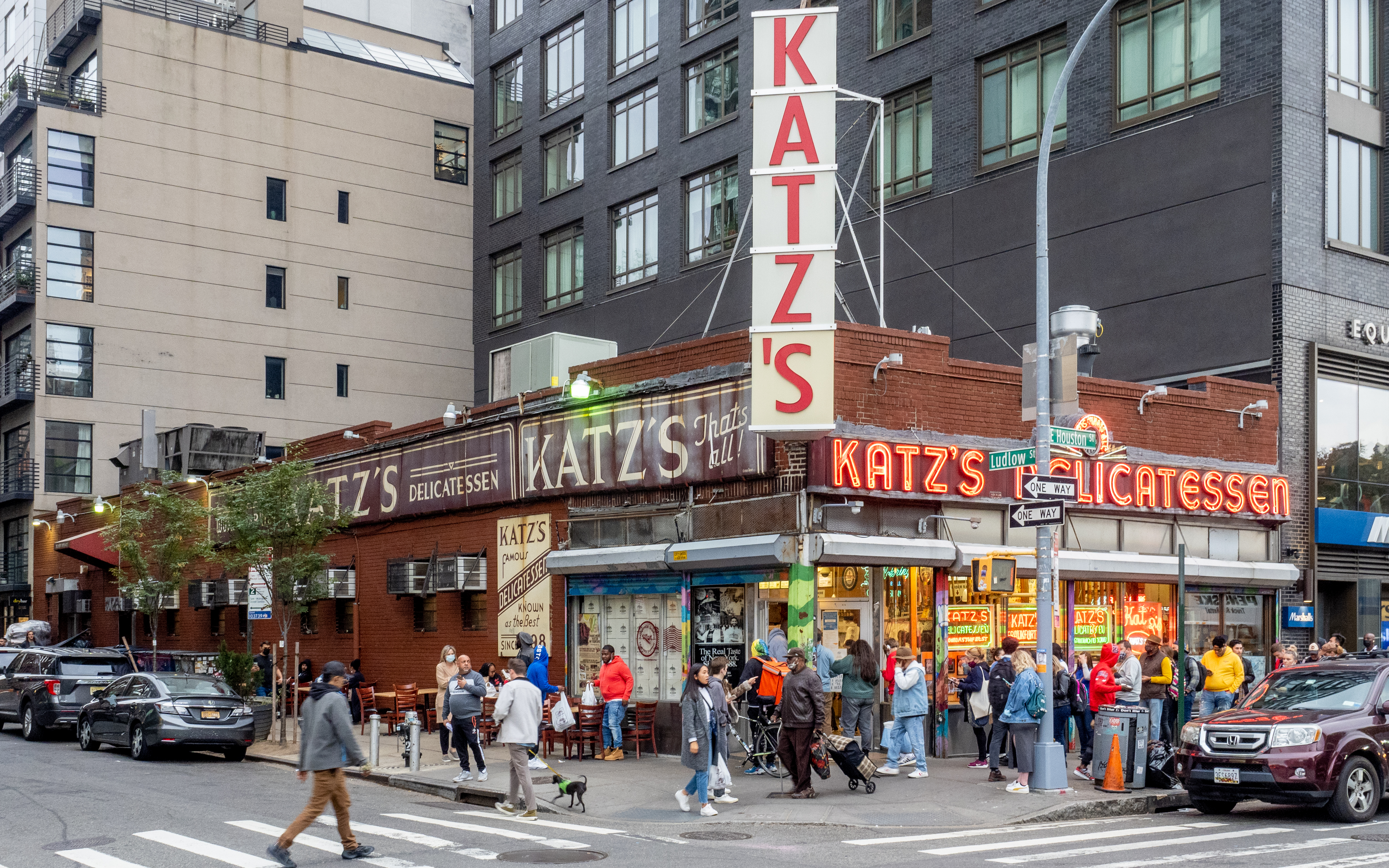
- Interactive map of Katz's Delicatessen

Restaurant information
- Established: 1888; 138 years ago
- Owner: Jake Dell
- Food type: Kosher style delicatessen
- Dress code: Casual
- Location: 205 East Houston Street, Manhattan, New York, 10002, United States
- Coordinates: 40°43′20″N 73°59′15″W
- Website: Official website

Katz's Delicatessen, also known as Katz's of New York City, is a Jewish deli at 205 East Houston Street, on the southwest corner of Houston and Ludlow Streets on the Lower East Side of Manhattan in New York City. Although its menu is inspired by culturally Jewish foods, Katz's Delicatessen is not kosher.

Since its founding in 1888, it has been popular among locals and tourists alike for its pastrami on rye, which is considered among New York's best.

Each week, Katz's serves 15,000 lb (6,800 kg) of pastrami, 8,000 lb (3,600 kg) of corned beef, 2,000 lb (910 kg) of salami, and 4,000 hot dogs. In 2016, Zagat gave Katz's a food rating of 4.5 out of 5, and ranked it as the number one deli in New York City.

== History ==
According to Katz's chronology, two brothers named Morris and Hyman Iceland established what is now known as Katz's Delicatessen on Ludlow Street in New York's Lower East Side. Upon the arrival of Willy Katz in 1903, the establishment's name was changed from Iceland Brothers to Iceland & Katz. Willy's cousin Benny joined him in 1910, buying out the Iceland brothers to form Katz's delicatessen. Their landlord Harry Tarowsky bought into the partnership in April 1917. However, according to food writer Robert F. Moss, records at Ellis Island indicate that Morris and Hyman Iceland immigrated to the United States in 1902. Moss states that the "Iceland Hyman delicatessen" had only opened by 1911.

The construction of the New York City Subway's Houston Street Line in the 1930s required the deli to move to the present side of the street, although the entrance remained on Ludlow Street. The vacant lot on Houston Street was home to barrels of meat and pickles until the storefront facade was added in the period 1946–1949.

In the early part of the twentieth century, the Lower East Side was home to thousands of newly immigrated families. This, along with the lack of public and private transportation, forged a solid community such that Katz's became a focal point for congregating. On Fridays, the neighborhood turned out for franks and beans, a long time Katz tradition.

During the peak of the Yiddish theater, the restaurant was frequented by actors, singers and comedians from the many theaters on Second Avenue as well as the National Theater on Houston Street. During World War II, the sons of the owners – Lenny Katz and Izzy Tarowsky – were both serving their country in the armed forces, and the family tradition of sending food to their sons became established as the company slogan "Send A Salami To Your Boy In The Army". The slogan was coined by Izzy's mother Rose Tarowsky, whose son served in the South Pacific as a bomber pilot.

The next change in ownership took place with the death of Willy Katz, when his son Lenny took over. In 1980, both Benny Katz and Harry Tarowsky died, leaving the store to Benny's son-in-law Artie Makstein and Harry's son Izzy. In 1988, on the 100th anniversary of its establishment, with no offspring of their own to leave the business to, Lenny, Izzy and Arthur sold Katz's to long-time restaurateur Martin Dell, his son Alan – who was a chef and a manager at a neighboring deli – and Martin's son-in-law Fred Austin. Alan's son Jake joined the business in late 2009 and as of 2020 is in charge of major operations.

In 2011, the U.S. government sued Katz's for violations of the Americans with Disabilities Act of 1990 (ADA). The lawsuit came after federal officials had read a 2011 Zagat guide that ranked the 50 most popular restaurants in New York City and investigated whether they were ADA-accessible; the guide had ranked Katz's 42nd. The restaurant celebrated its 125th anniversary in 2013 by opening a pop-up art gallery next door. The gallery featured original art by local New York City artists with Baron Von Fancy and Ricky Powell among the first displayed and others rotated on a monthly basis.

In 2017, Katz's opened its first auxiliary location, in the City Point development's DeKalb Market Hall in Downtown Brooklyn, and also instituted mail-order sales.

In September 2021, it was announced that Katz's Delicatessen would partner with Hendrick's Gin to make gin-inspired pickles. Master Distiller Lesley Gracie collaborated with Katz's owner Jake Dell to create a brine that featured gin standard juniper and cubeb berries, with an additional emphasis on coriander, a botanical shared by both Katz's pickles and Hendrick's Gin. In December 2024, as part of a settlement with the U.S. government, Katz's agreed to renovate its Ludlow Street building to make it wheelchair-accessible.

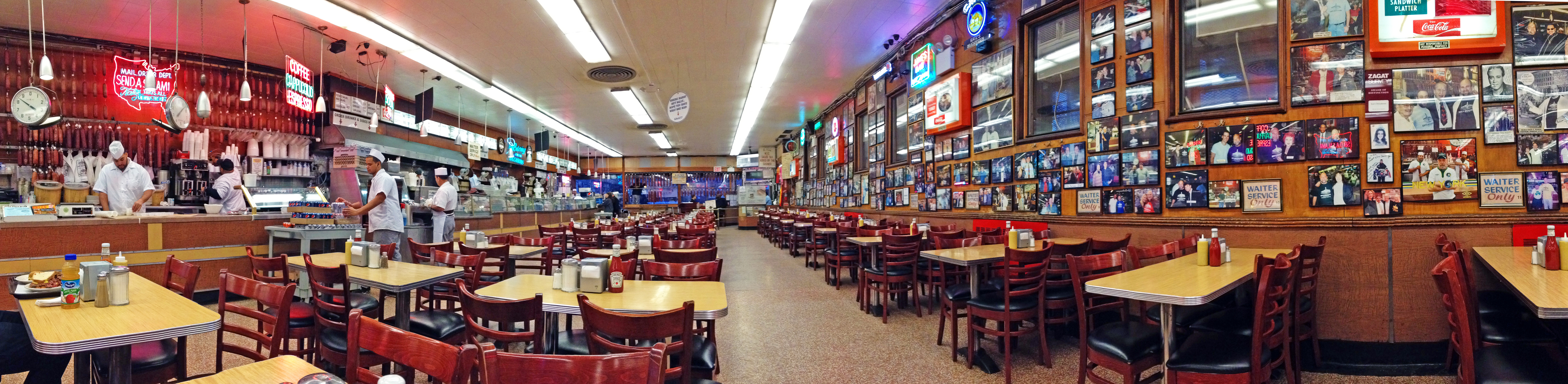
Early morning at Katz's, before the crowds

=== Catchphrases ===
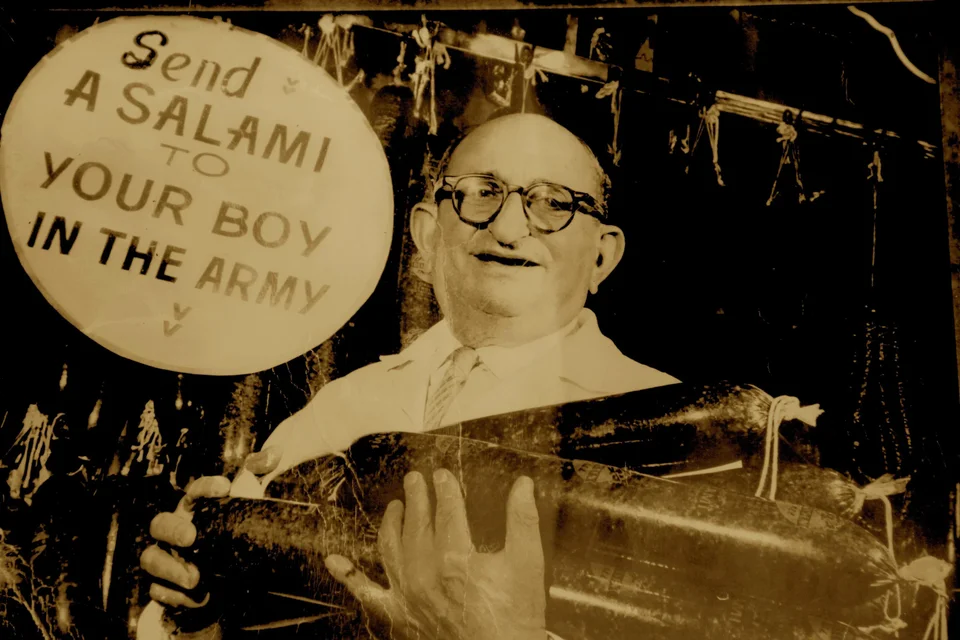
Sign at Katz's encouraging parents to send salami to their sons in the military during World War II

During World War II, the sons of the owners – Lenny Katz and Izzy Tarowsky – were both serving their country in the armed forces, and the family tradition of sending food to their sons became established as the company slogan "Send A Salami To Your Boy In The Army". The slogan was coined by Izzy's mother Rose Tarowsky, whose son served in the South Pacific as a bomber pilot. It is part of the lyrics of a song in the 1950 Martin and Lewis film At War with the Army, and referenced in the Tom Lehrer song "So Long, Mom (A Song for World War III)" in the following lyric: "Remember, Mommy, I'm off to get a Commie, so send me a salami, and try to smile somehow". Katz's continues to support American troops today: the deli has arranged special international shipping for U.S. military addresses only and has been a source of gift packages to troops stationed in Afghanistan and Iraq.

Another of the deli's catchphrases is "Katz's, that's all!", which came about when a signmaker asked Harry Tarowsky what to say on the deli's sign, and Harry replied "Katz's, that's all". This was misinterpreted by the signmaker, who painted the sign as it stands today on the side of the building.

== Tickets ==
As each customer enters Katz's, a door attendant hands them a printed, numbered ticket. As they receive their food from various stations/areas throughout the deli (separate for sandwiches, hot dogs, bottled drinks, fountain drinks, etc.), employees compute a running total of the pre-tax bill. If several people's orders are combined on a single ticket, a cashier collects the blank tickets.

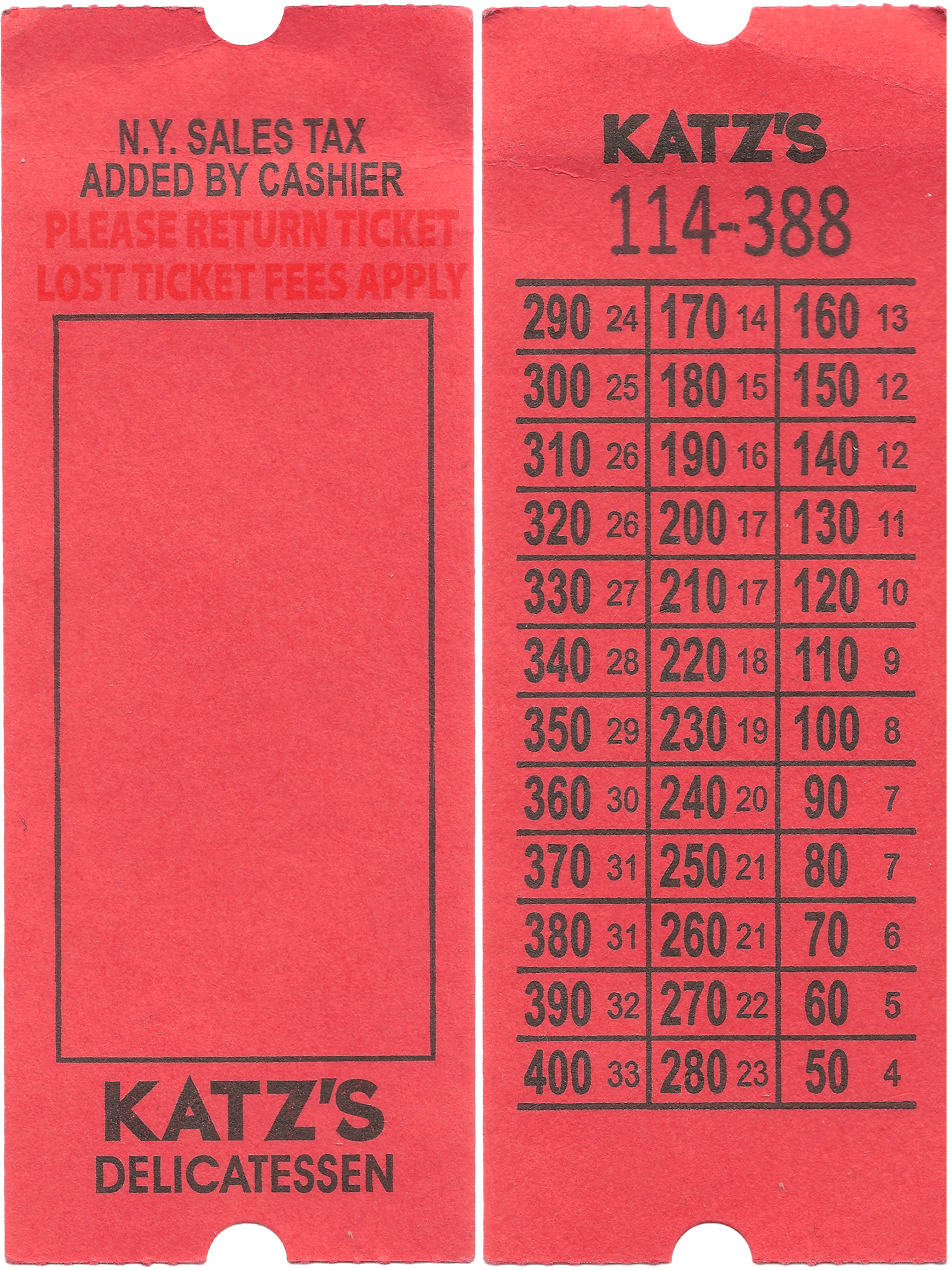
Katz's Delicatessen Ticket 114-388

Katz's has instituted a "lost ticket fee". If a customer loses a ticket, an additional $50 surcharge is added to the bill. The fee's purpose, as stated by the management, is to encourage patrons to go back and find the lost ticket in the hopes of preventing theft (substituting a smaller ticket for a larger one).

== In popular culture ==
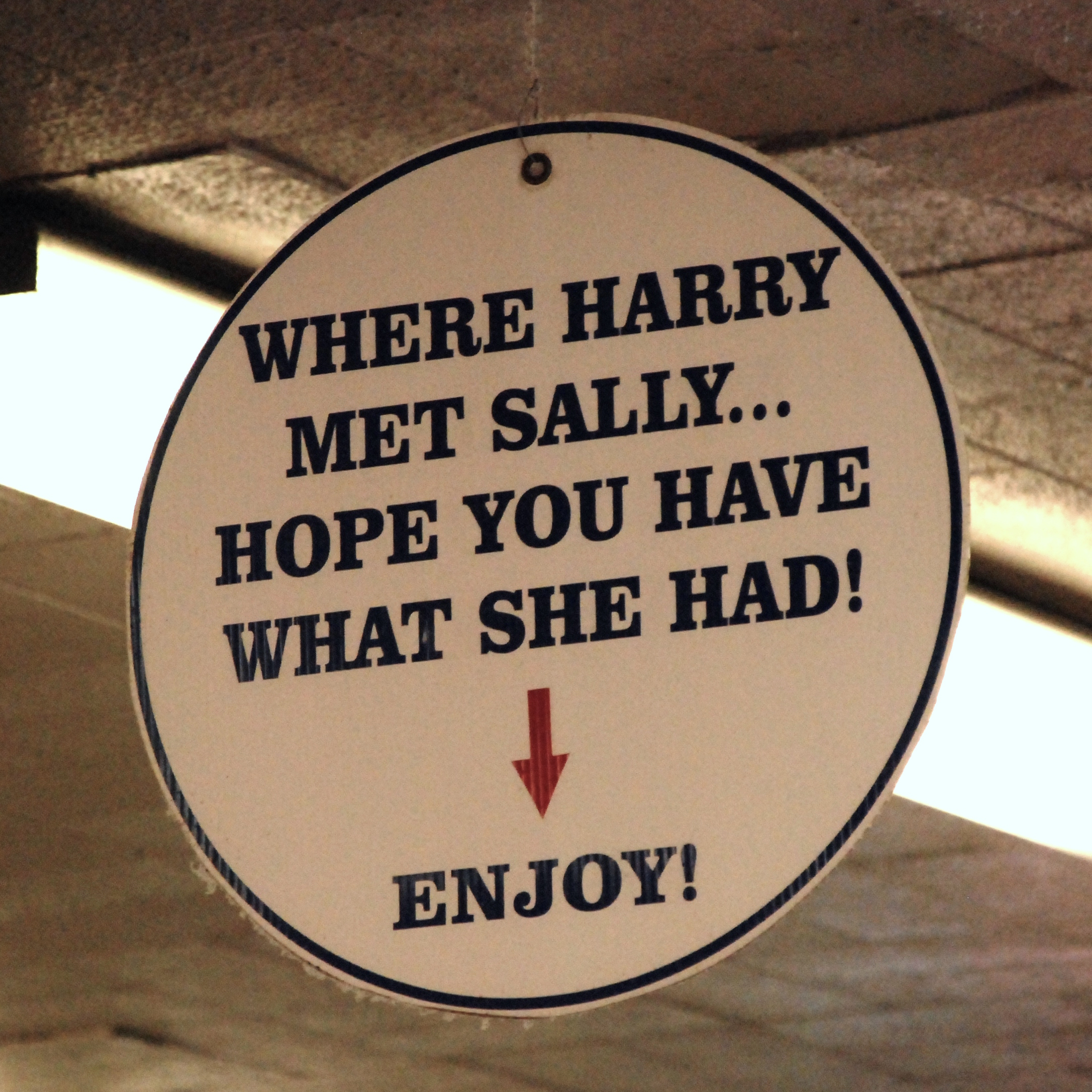
The sign at Katz's Delicatessen commemorating the film When Harry Met Sally...

=== Film ===
- Katz's was the site of Meg Ryan's fake orgasm scene in the 1989 romantic comedy When Harry Met Sally..., followed by Estelle Reiner's line "I'll have what she's having"; the table at which Ryan and Billy Crystal sat is marked with a sign that says, "Where Harry met Sally... hope you have what she had! Enjoy!"
- Johnny Depp's character met an FBI contact at Katz's in Donnie Brasco (1997).
- Katz's Deli is the site for a scene in Across the Universe (2007), in which Max reveals he has been drafted into the Vietnam War.
- The deli appears in the 2007 film We Own the Night, starring Joaquin Phoenix, Mark Wahlberg and Eva Mendes.
- Katz's appeared in the background of the claymation movie Mary and Max (2009), in most of Max's bus stop scenes.
- The 2010 Ugandan action comedy film Who Killed Captain Alex? begins with a scene in which Ugandan soldiers jump from a helicopter and fire their guns at Katz's, destroying it in an explosion.
- In the French film Nous York (2012), Manu Payet and Dree Hemingway visit Katz's, where Fred Austin greets them at their table.
- In the 2001 comedy-drama indie film Sidewalks of New York, David Krumholtz's character Benjamin and a friend wolf down a pastrami sandwich and hot dog at Katz's.
- Katz's is featured in the 2014 documentary Deli Man.
- Katz's appears in the 2004 film Looking for Kitty.
- In the film Off Beat (1986), a group of police officers enjoy a hot meal at the deli.
- The contract to kill Frank Sinatra's character in Contract on Cherry Street (1977) was drafted in a Katz's meat locker.
- In a scene in Enchanted (2007), Nathaniel (Timothy Spall) contacts Queen Narissa (Susan Sarandon) from Katz's kitchen and then joins Prince Edward (James Marsden) for lunch while trying to silence Pip the chipmunk from spilling his betrayal.

=== Television ===
- Katz's serves as a local hangout for Jim Gaffigan in several episodes of TV Land's The Jim Gaffigan Show (2015).
- Law & Order has filmed outside the restaurant.
- Impractical Jokers filmed for a season 4 and 8 episode inside the restaurant, as did Man v. Food and Adam Richman's Best Sandwich in America.

=== Advertisements ===
- In February 2025, Meg Ryan and Billy Crystal appeared in an advert for Hellmann's mayonnaise, which was filmed inside the restaurant and first aired during Super Bowl LIX. The advert parodied the deli scene from When Harry Met Sally, with Crystal commenting "I can't believe they let us back in here!". The "I'll have what she's having" line was delivered by Sydney Sweeney.

== Gallery ==
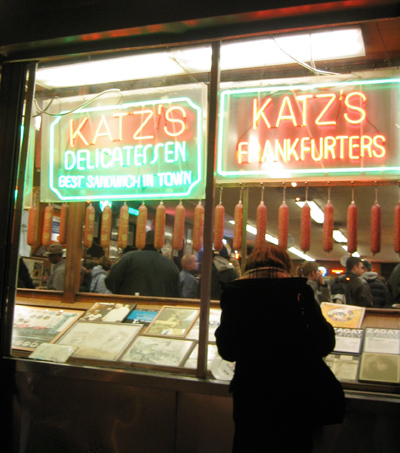
Front window at Katz's

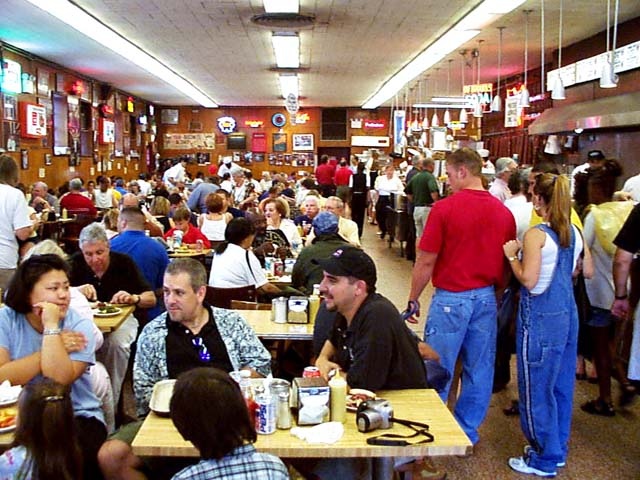
Tables at Katz's on a typical Sunday

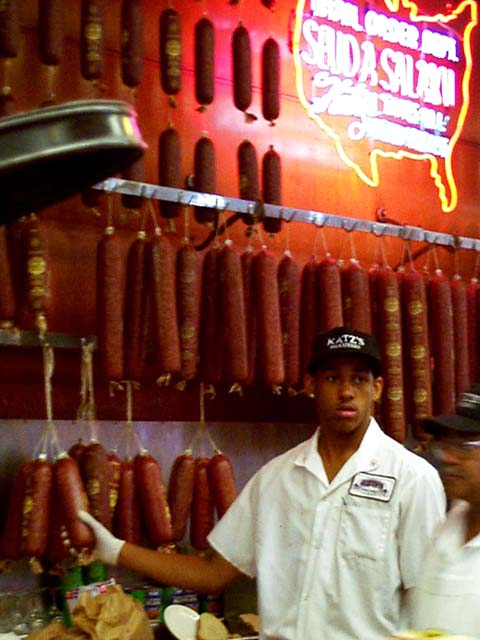
Salami

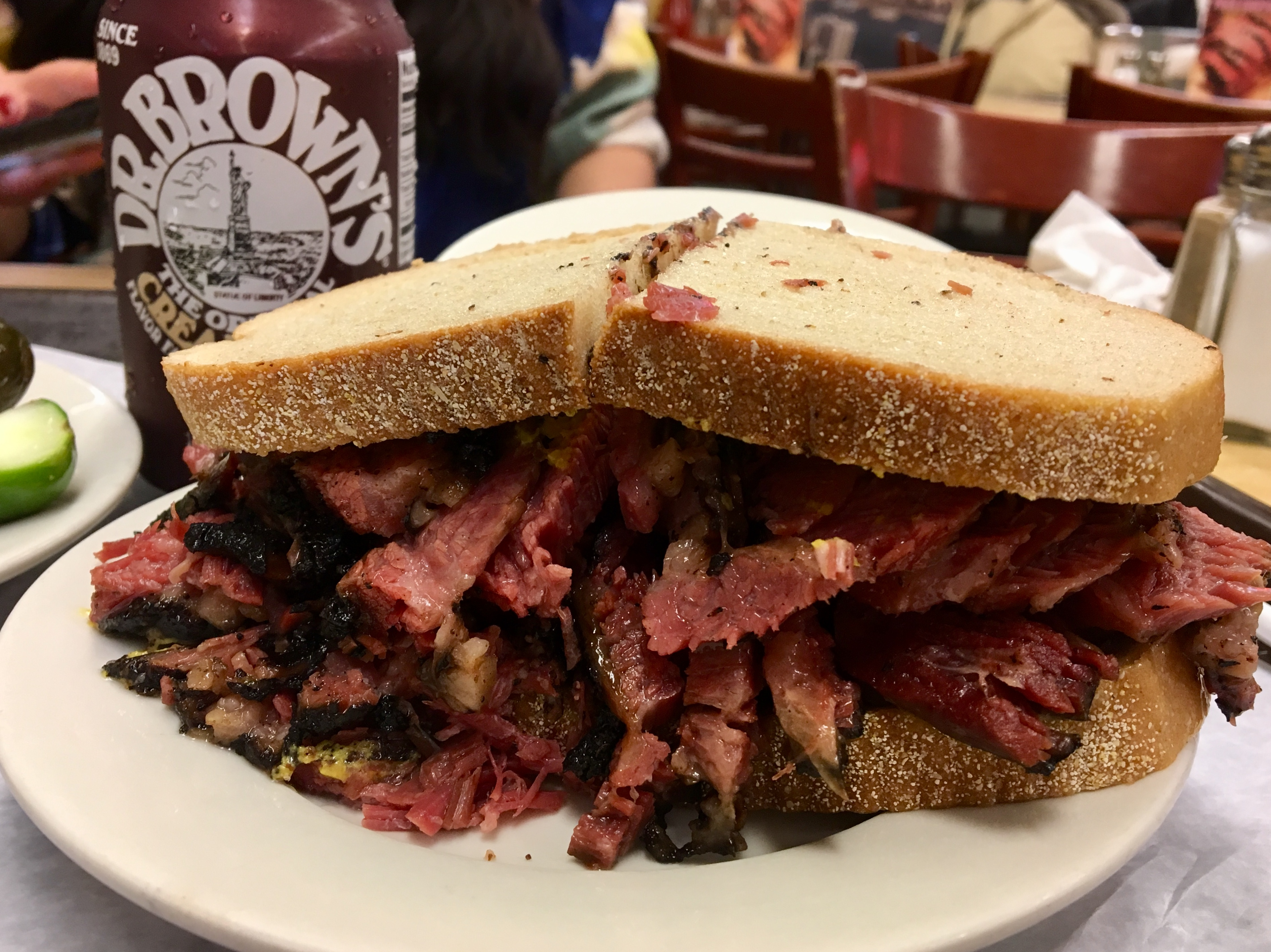
Pastrami on rye

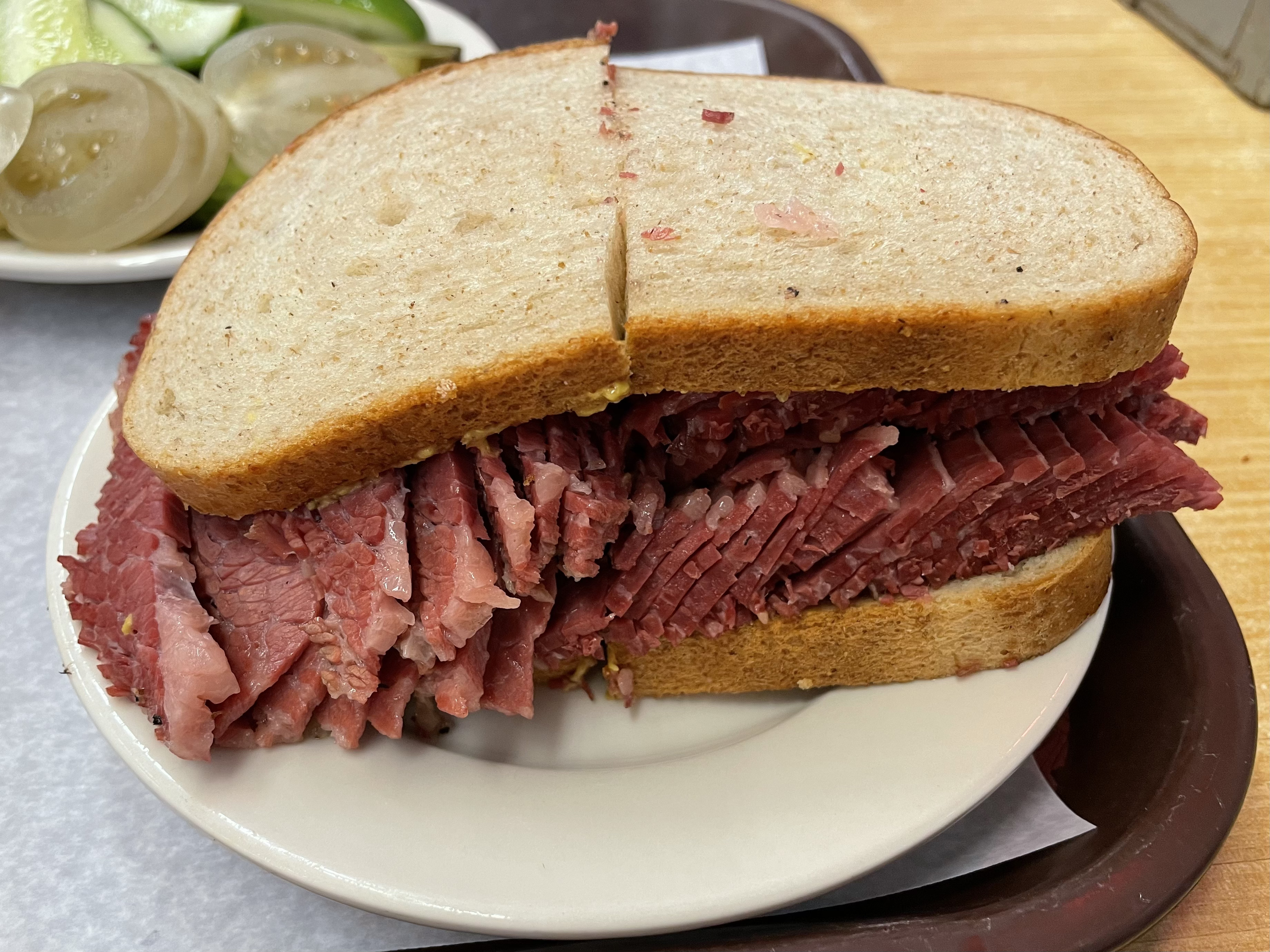
Corned beef on rye

== See also ==
- List of Ashkenazi Jewish restaurants
- List of delicatessens
