= Kosher style =

Jewish cuisine

Kosher style refers to Jewish cuisine—most often that of Ashkenazi Jews—which may or may not actually be kosher. It is a stylistic designation rather than one based on the laws of kashrut. In some U.S. states, the use of this term in advertising is illegal as a misleading term under consumer protection laws.

Jews who do not keep kosher, but wish to restrict themselves to eating ethnically "traditional style" foods may consider themselves to be keeping kosher style.

== History ==
The concept can be traced back to Fressfrömmigkeit, a term that was used in Germany to denote a type of eating style or food identity that revolved around religious practice. The actual term "kosher style" was invented by Nathan Handwerker, co-founder of Nathan's Famous. Because Nathan's lacked rabbinic supervision and the meat was not kosher, Handwerker advertised his all-beef hot dogs as kosher style because they were not made from pork or horse meat, both of which are considered treif. During the 1920s, the practice became popular amongst Jews who were assimilating into American society, allowing them to preserve the connection to their heritage without fully observing the dietary laws.

Over time, the meaning of kosher style has evolved and expanded, reflecting changes within Jewish communities and broader society. In contemporary practice, kosher style is often encountered at social events and gatherings, where meals might exclude certain non-kosher items but not adhere strictly to kashrut.

== Relationship to kashrut law ==
Historically speaking, kosher style referred to foods that would normally be kosher, such as chicken noodle soup or pareve meals (neither meat nor dairy, the mixing of which is forbidden according to traditional halakhic [Jewish law] standards of kashrut), except that these foods do not currently meet proper halakhic standards. Meat might not be kosher slaughtered. Kosher style would not have included meat from forbidden animals, such as pork and shellfish, nor would it have contained both meat and dairy in the same dish. More recently however, the definition of kosher style has expanded to sometimes include these items.

Almost always when a restaurant calls itself "kosher style", the food itself is not actually kosher. For example, the Reuben sandwich, which contains meat and cheese, is not kosher. Dairy-based desserts, such as cheesecake, may be offered as complements to a meat dish. In the case of fish however, which is considered pareve, lox on a bagel spread with cream cheese may still be considered kosher if the lox, cheese, bagel and all other ingredients meet the requirements of kashrut.

Jews who adhere strictly to the laws of kashrut will not eat at kosher style establishments. Furthermore, the fact that such establishments appear to be kosher can be deceptive to Jews who are visiting an unfamiliar city and looking for kosher food. Some of these establishments are also open for business on the Jewish Sabbath, when this is forbidden by halakha. Yet others may choose to eat at such restaurants without consuming meat or cheese.

=== Differentiations in practice ===
At the same time, kosher style allows for variation in adherence to kashrut, reflecting different practices within the Jewish community. For some, kosher style implies abstinence from non-kosher animals, like pork and shellfish, and the avoidance of mixing meat and dairy in meals. These individuals may consume meat from animals that are kosher but not necessarily slaughtered according to kashrut standards.

The notion of kosher style serves individuals and communities navigating between strict religious observance and cultural identification with Jewish culinary traditions. According to Hasia Diner, kosher style represents a balancing act between tradition and assimilation, providing a sense of Jewish identity through food without strict adherence to kashrut.

== Examples of menu items ==
Some dining establishments, notably delicatessens, serve kosher style food. This usually means that they serve traditional Ashkenazic Jewish foods, such as chopped liver, bagels with cream cheese and lox, smoked sable, whitefish salad, gefilte fish, knishes, latkes, blintzes, cabbage rolls, egg cream, matzo ball soup, borscht, kasha varnishkes, stuffed derma, p'tcha, cholent, kugel, pickles, sauerkraut, and cold cut sandwiches, especially pastrami, corned beef, brisket and beef tongue.

== Criticism ==
Critics of kosher style point out that the term itself is an oxymoron, since it creates an illusion of kashrut where the true emphasis is on a style of cuisine, rather than compliance with religious dietary laws. They argue that it dilutes the significance of kashrut, and misleads consumers regarding the food's compliance with Jewish dietary laws. The concern is that the term blurs the line between what is genuinely kosher and what merely reflects a style of Jewish cuisine, potentially causing confusion amongst both practicing Jews and the broader public. In some U.S. states, the use of this term in advertising is illegal as a misleading term under consumer protection laws.

The exact definition of kosher style may vary between communities and individuals, reflecting diverse interpretations and practices related to Jewish dietary laws. The term also relates to products marketed as "kosher style", prompting some regions to establish legislation to clarify labeling practices and prevent consumer misunderstanding. For instance, kosher style pickles might be produced without kosher certification or supervision, even while being associated with Jewish culinary tradition. As the kosher food industry expands into new territory with diversified choices, some believe that the concept of kosher style has become outdated and less meaningful, as it does not accurately reflect that diversity, along with contemporary Jewish dietary practices and preferences.

== Eateries ==
Several notable restaurants in Lower Manhattan fit into the kosher style genre, including Katz's Delicatessen and Russ & Daughters.

== See also ==
- Kosher by ingredient
- Kosher restaurant
- List of kosher restaurants
