= Jewish deli =

Delicatessen serving Jewish cuisine

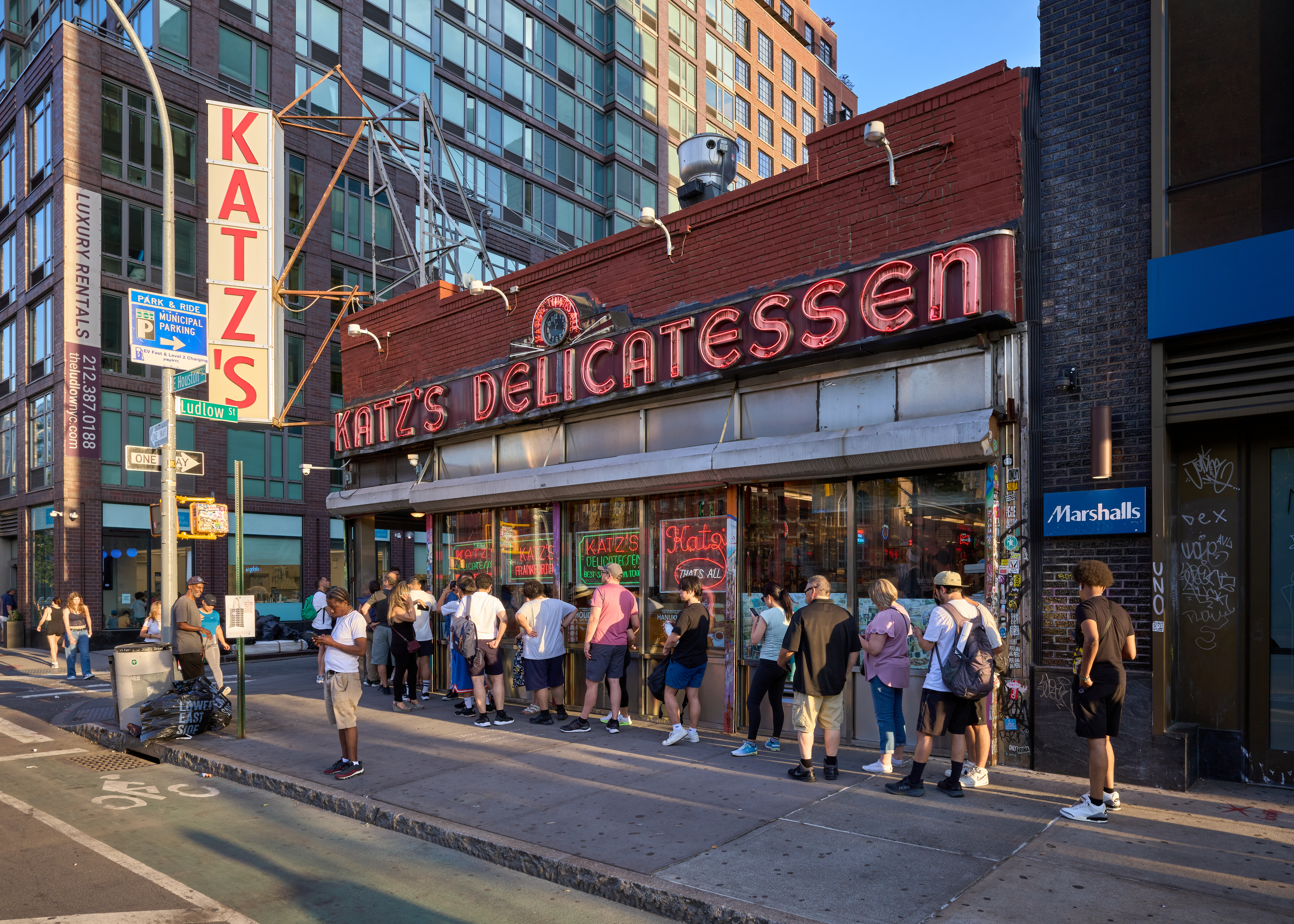
Katz's Delicatessen, a popular Jewish deli on the Lower East Side in New York City, featured in When Harry Met Sally.

A Jewish deli, also known as a Jewish delicatessen, is a store that serves various traditional dishes of Jewish cuisine, mostly Ashkenazi Jewish cuisine. Known for their robust sandwiches, such as pastrami on rye and Reuben sandwiches, they also specialize in traditional Jewish diaspora soups and other ethnically rooted dishes. As retail delicatessens, most also sell a selection of their products such as sliced meats by the pound, prepared salads, pickles, and offer dine-in or take-out.

The emergence of the Jewish deli developed in accordance with local culture. Jewish delis differed from their German deli counterparts mostly by being kosher. While some delis have full kosher certification, others operate in a kosher-style, refraining from mixing meat and dairy in the same dish. Other Jewish delis serve non-kosher animal products such as bacon or shellfish and non-kosher dishes such as the Reuben sandwich.

Jewish delis feature prominently in Jewish culture, as well as in general American popular culture, particularly in the cities of New York, Chicago and Los Angeles as well as in Canada, especially in Montreal and Toronto. The United Kingdom has also historically been a home to many Jewish delis, especially in the London area.

== In the United States ==
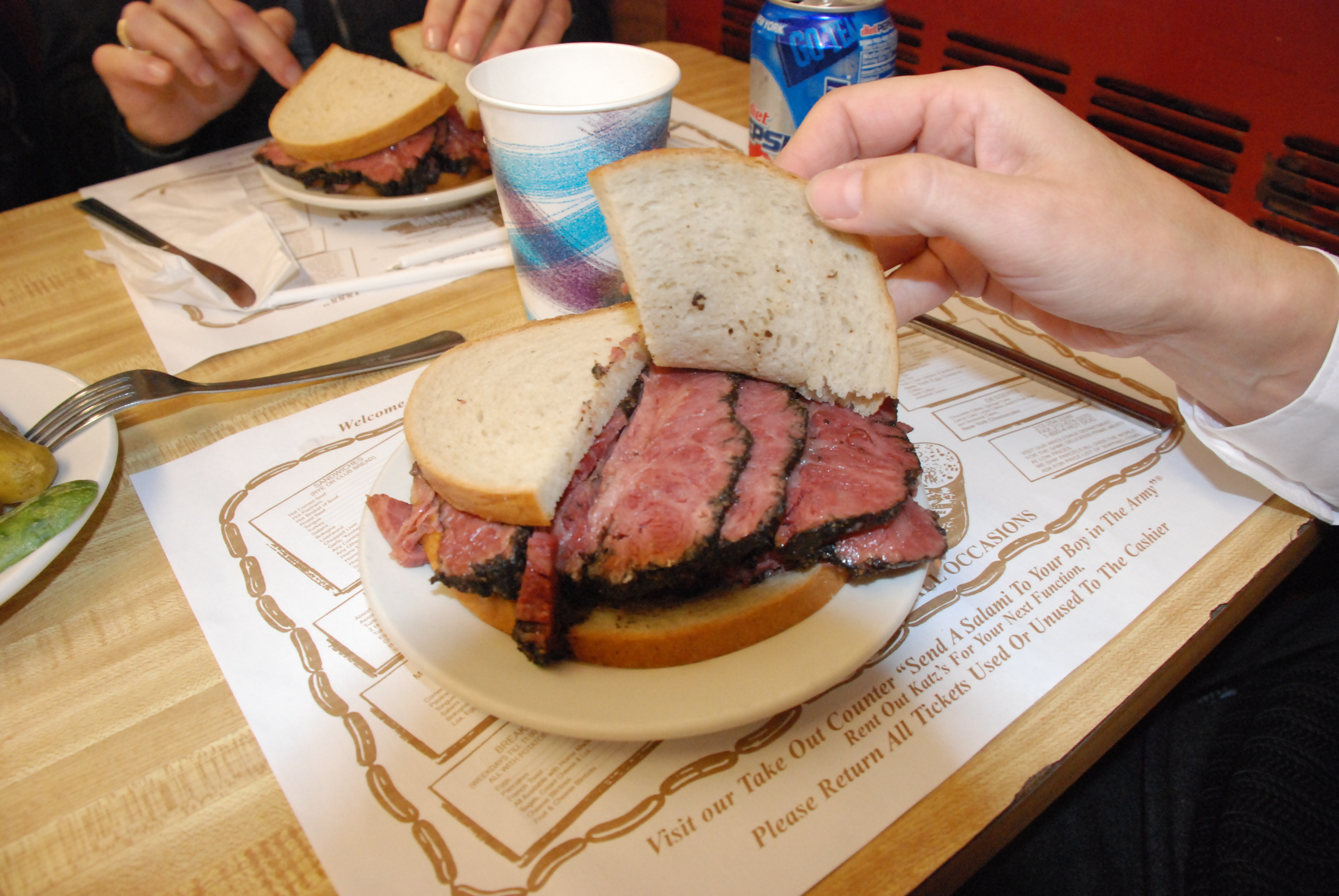
Pastrami sandwich from Katz's Delicatessen, New York City

The origins of the American Jewish delicatessen can be traced to the wave of German immigration to the United States in the mid-1800s. In the decade spanning from 1850 to 1860 nearly one million Germans immigrated to America, both Jews and non-Jews, with 215,000 Germans arriving in the United States in 1854 alone. Some of these immigrants opened storefronts to make a living, and to offer culturally familiar food to other immigrants. Many of the original establishments were inspired by German delikatessens, selling beef frankfurters, sauerkraut, cold cuts, dill pickles and liverwurst.

According to American author and professor Ted Merwin, the deli experienced its most significant growth not during the initial wave of immigration, as commonly assumed, but rather during the interwar period of the 1920s and 1930s. During this time that the offspring of Jewish immigrants and Ashkenazi immigrants from Eastern Europe began to frequent delis in the theater district, where they indulged in sandwiches and cheesecake. The kosher deli trailed the Jewish community as it dispersed into the city's outer boroughs, serving as a tangible emblem of its members enduring commitment to their cultural heritage.

After the Holocaust, a new Jewish population within the United States would facilitate the reintroduction of these community staples. While upon their arrival many of the post-war Jewish immigrants would work in the meat industry, some business owners would transform their butcher shops into operational delicatessens, something that many modern Americans are likely to be familiar with.

As Jewish delis rose in popularity in New York, they became a bridge between second-generation Jewish immigrants and their origins. They served as a cultural gathering place for the community. Merwin suggests that the Jewish deli became a secular equivalent of the synagogue for a generation of Jews who were no longer as interested in attending religious services. The second generation's increased access to deli meats was a sign of growing success, something their parents would not have been able to afford when first arriving to the United States.

In New York, Jewish food retail historically separated meat delicatessens from appetizing stores, which sold fish, dairy products and pickled foods. The division reflected Jewish dietary law, which prohibits mixing meat and dairy; many later delis combined both traditions as observance declined and the foods entered the mainstream.

From their roots as an extension of kosher butcher shops, delis often have a long counter and glass cases showing the meats and takeaway food offerings. Delis expanded to have tables and chairs, that being at the center of a case before the New York Supreme Court in 1910 questioning if this made a deli a restaurant. The ruling was that it did not, and that delicatessens come in all shapes and offerings without narrowing them to the definition of a restaurant.

As more Jewish delis opened, there started to be an increase in "kosher-style" delicatessens, expanding the offerings to strike a balance of the familiar of the cultural foods and the new American tastes and society, some delis going as far as offering the non-kosher foods on separate silverware and on separate dishes. Some "kosher-style" delis would serve Jewish food, but the meat would not be kosher. These delis helped appeal to both Jewish and non-Jewish patrons for a variety of reasons, including those not wanting to be seen in Kosher establishments, and keeping costs down on product.

Since their height in the 1930s, Jewish delis are on the decline. In New York (where there was the highest concentration of delis) there were an estimated 3,000 Jewish delis, and as of 2021 in the same area there are fewer than 30. According to author Rebecca Rossman, this decline is attributed the cost of running a deli yields increasingly lower returns, the labor-intensive nature of the job, and the decline in popularity of immigrant Jewish food.

== In the United Kingdom ==
Whilst some Jewish bakers, delicatessens, and butchers still exist in the United Kingdom, mostly in London with some in Manchester, where the second largest Jewish community in the country is to be found, and a few in other cities, the early 20th century boom in kosher establishments was followed by a decline in later years, with the Jewish Chronicle regularly reporting the closures of food shops in the 1970s and 1980s. There were 198 kosher butchers in 1956, and just 26 in 2005.

This was due to several factors, one being that, as the Chronicle reported at the time, fewer Jews in the U.K. were observing kosher, from 90% before World War II to 50% by 1975, and so would buy their food in the same stores as the majority of the population. Another was simply expense: kosher food cost more, a fact that the Chronicle covered with reports of concerned shoppers and rabinical inquiries. A third was that kosher products were available in branches of U.K. supermarkets where there was a local Jewish customer base to cater to, including Selfridges, Safeway, Tesco, and Sainsbury's.

== Menu ==
Food portions at Jewish delis are known for being large, and the menus are extensive, ranging from baked goods, breakfasts, large sandwiches of pickled, smoked, and cured meats, dinner plates, desserts, and more.

== In popular media ==
Jewish delis have been featured in popular media.

- Broad City (Zabar's)
- Change of Habit (Glassman's Deli and Market)
- Curb Your Enthusiasm (Mort's Palisades Deli referenced as "Leo's Deli")
- Homicide: New York (Carnegie Deli)
- Mad Men (Canter's)
- The Marvelous Mrs. Maisel (Stage Deli, based on a real, but now closed deli, the production filmed in Arti's Deli, which is also now closed.)
- Sex and the City (Zabar's)
- When Harry Met Sally (Katz's Delicatessen)

== See also ==
- List of Jewish delis
- Appetizing store, similar establishment for Ashkenazi-style fish and dairy
- Jewish dairy restaurant
- Save the Deli – a book about the decline of the Jewish delicatessen
