= Salumeria Biellese =

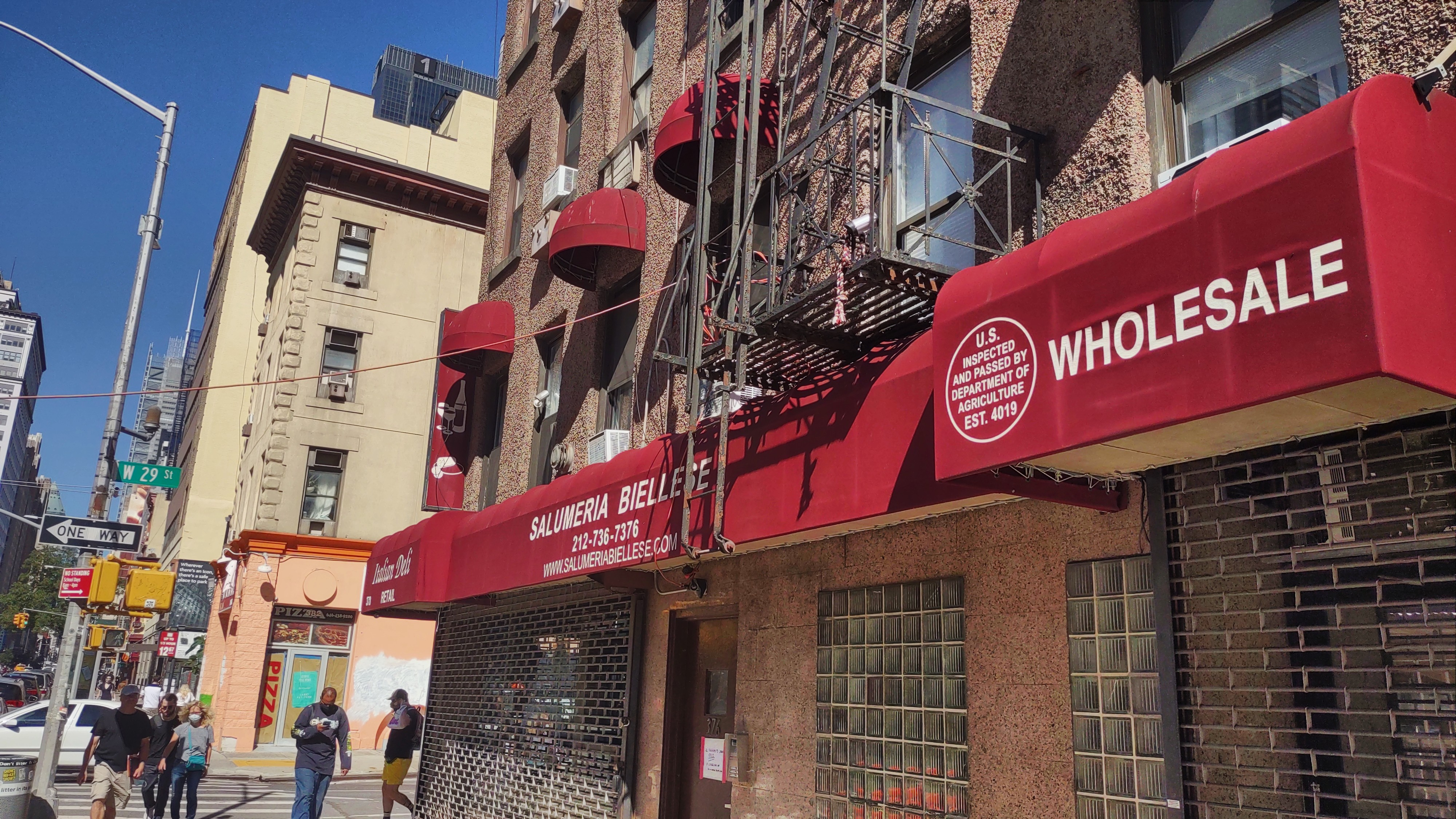
- Salumeria Biellese in 2021
- Interactive map of Salumeria Biellese

Restaurant information
- Location: 378 Eighth Avenue, New York, New York, 10001, United States
- Coordinates: 40°44′56″N 73°59′44″W
- Website: salumeriabiellese.com

Salumeria Biellese is a historic Italian deli at 8th Avenue and 29th Street in the Chelsea neighborhood of Manhattan in New York City. It was established in 1925.

== History ==
In 1925, two friends from the Northern Italian Province of Biella opened the salumeria, an Italian store where fresh meats are processed and sold as salumi. Originally the store was known as Italian Salumeria Biellese-Groceries and Charcuterie, the deli's original location was in 8th Avenue and 28th Street, in the Chelsea area of Manhattan. It produced Italian dry cured salted meats such as salame (cured or cooked stuffed in an intestine casing), capocollo (cured neck meat cooked in both spicy and non spicy manner), mortadella (Cooked, baloney like meat with large fat chunks), zampino (cooked, salami like meat, stuffed in the pork skin of the leg casing rather than an intestine casing), testa (head cheese, made of all scraps mixed with gelatine then stuffed in a casing), sausages (salame like meat, stuffed in small and large intestine casings), and other deli items. Salumeria Biellese has also been supplying various restaurants with sausages, and also prepared cooked meats such as roast beef, roast pork, and sausages in tomato sauce. Today, Salumeria Biellese has been relocated to the corner of 8th Avenue and 29th Street, one block north from the original location. The deli has introduced seating for those who chose to dine in.

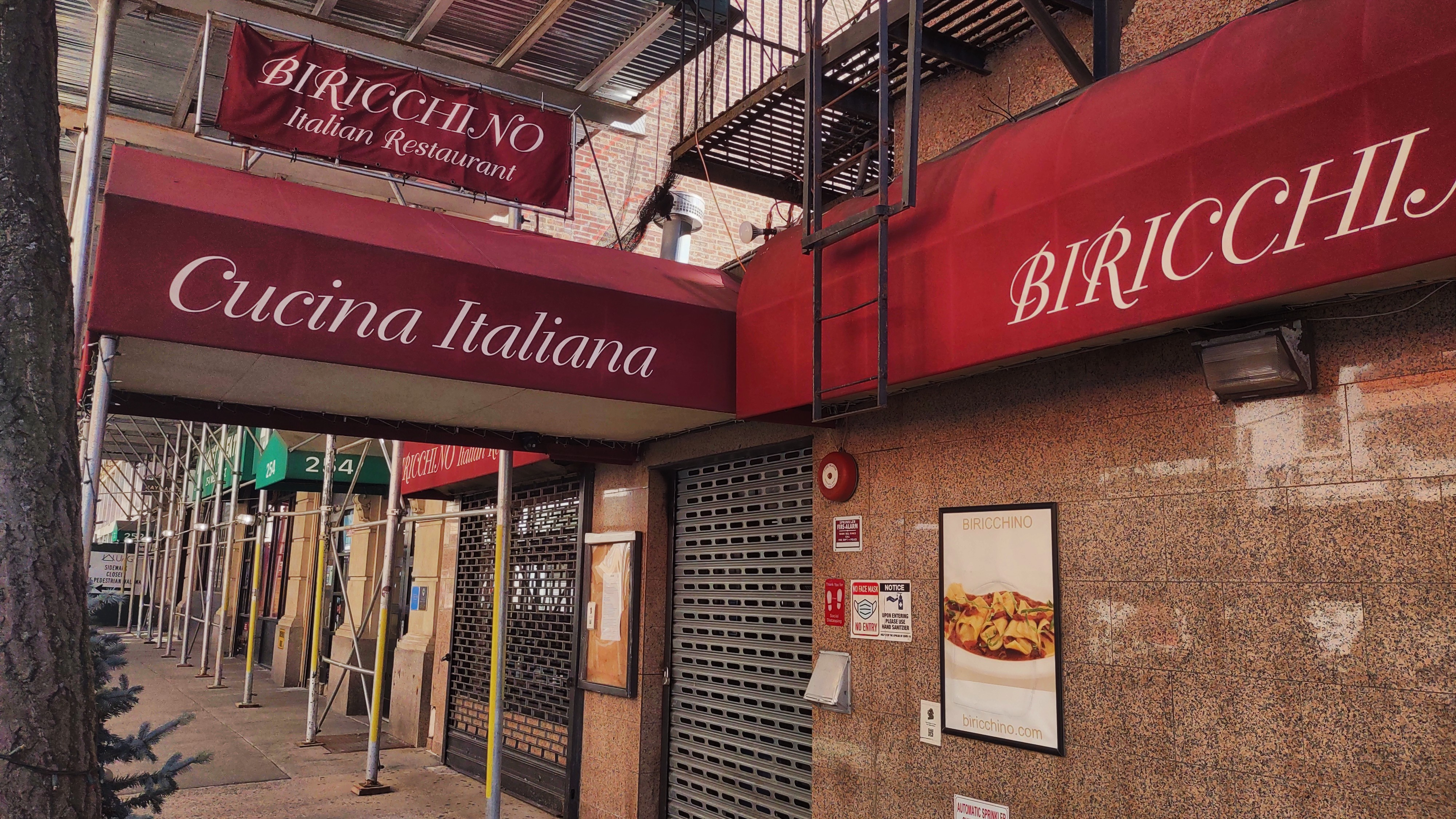
Biricchino

The owners expanded their production line by opening a factory in New Jersey. The partners also opened an Italian Restaurant called Biricchino in 260 West 29th Street, Manhattan. This business grew with the growing population of New York City and surrounding areas. In 2010, Salumeria Biellese was selected as a recipient in the Slow food NYC with a seal of approval. In 2025, this business will be reaching its 100th year anniversary in the same area as on 8th Avenue and 29th street in Manhattan.

== See also ==
- Charcuterie
- List of restaurants in New York City
- List of submarine sandwich restaurants
- Salumi
