= Traiteur (culinary profession) =

French food seller (historical)

A traiteur (/ˈtrɛtɜːr/; French: [tʁɛ.tœʁ]) is a French food-seller, whose places of business were arguably the precursors of the modern restaurant. Prior to the late 18th century, diners who wished to "dine out" could dine at a traiteur's, or order meals to go. The cooks and caterers guild – informally known as the traiteurs – progressively claimed the right to make any sophisticated meals, leaving inns and taverns to mainly make roast or grilled meat. As of the late seventeenth century, many offered a table d'hôte, a meal offered at a set price with no choice of dishes. However both cabarets and traiteurs could also offer individual choice of dishes, despite claims to the contrary.

In modern France, the word often refers to a caterer.

Traiteur is an agent noun formed from the verb traiter ('treat'), which literally refers to the action of "treating" someone to something (for instance, a meal). The root of the verb is Latin tractare ('manage, handle'), a frequentative of trahere ('pull, draw'): in ancient times, for example, Latins used the expression littera tractoria (roughly rendered as 'treatment letter') to indicate a document the envoys of a prince would be given to receive food, accommodation and means of transport in the lands they would pass by, so to get a full treatment along their way. This Latin root originated both French traiteur and Italian trattoria.

== Present-day traiteurs ==
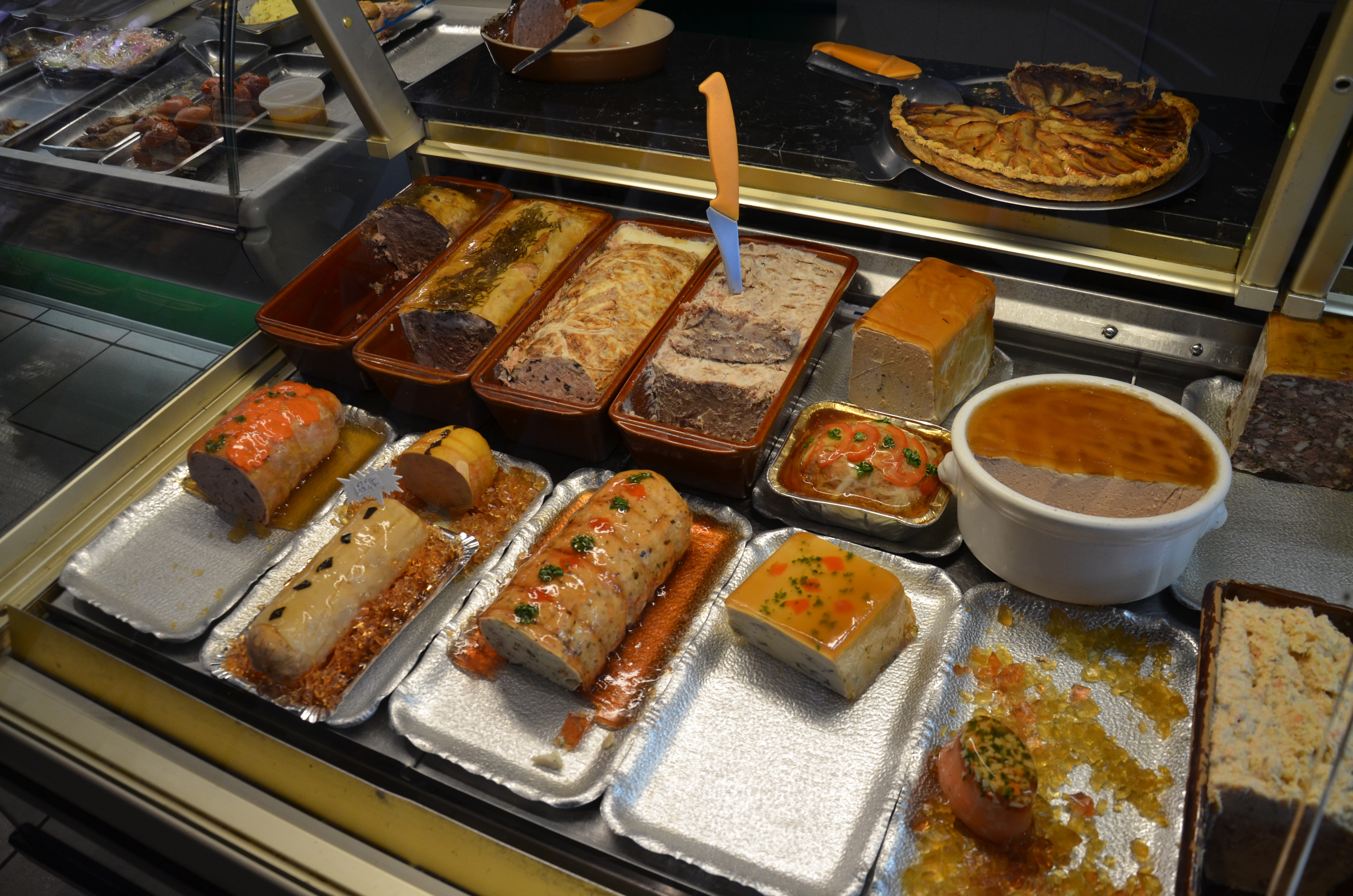
Modern traiteur stall

Today in France, a traiteur is a catering business devoted to take-out food and service of banquets. Many traiteurs also undertake home delivery. Generally there is no seating on the business premises; a few traiteurs may have very limited seating. Especially in market towns, where there is competition, traiteurs take great pride in the beauty of their window displays. Traiteur 'departments' are now common in supermarchés, the equivalent of the US/UK delicatessen. The staple of this type of business is an array of salads, cold meat and seafood dishes. In 2018, 10,090 traiteurs operated in France.

== See also ==
- Ghost kitchen
- Salumeria

== General references ==
- Fedèle, P.; Bravo, E. (September 2006). "Traiteurs Organisateurs Réceptions: La mutation s'acceélère" [Traiteurs and Caterers: The Pace of Change Quickens]. Neo Restauration. No. 434.
- Pianigiani, Ottorino (1907). Vocabolario Etimologico della Lingua Italiana (in Italian). Rome: Albrighi & Segati.
- Spang, Rebecca L. (2001). The Invention of the Restaurant: Paris and Modern Gastronomic Culture. Harvard Historical Studies, 135. Cambridge, MA: Harvard University Press. ISBN 978-0-674-00685-0. OCLC 1156645155.
