= Delicatessen =

Processed meat and confections shop

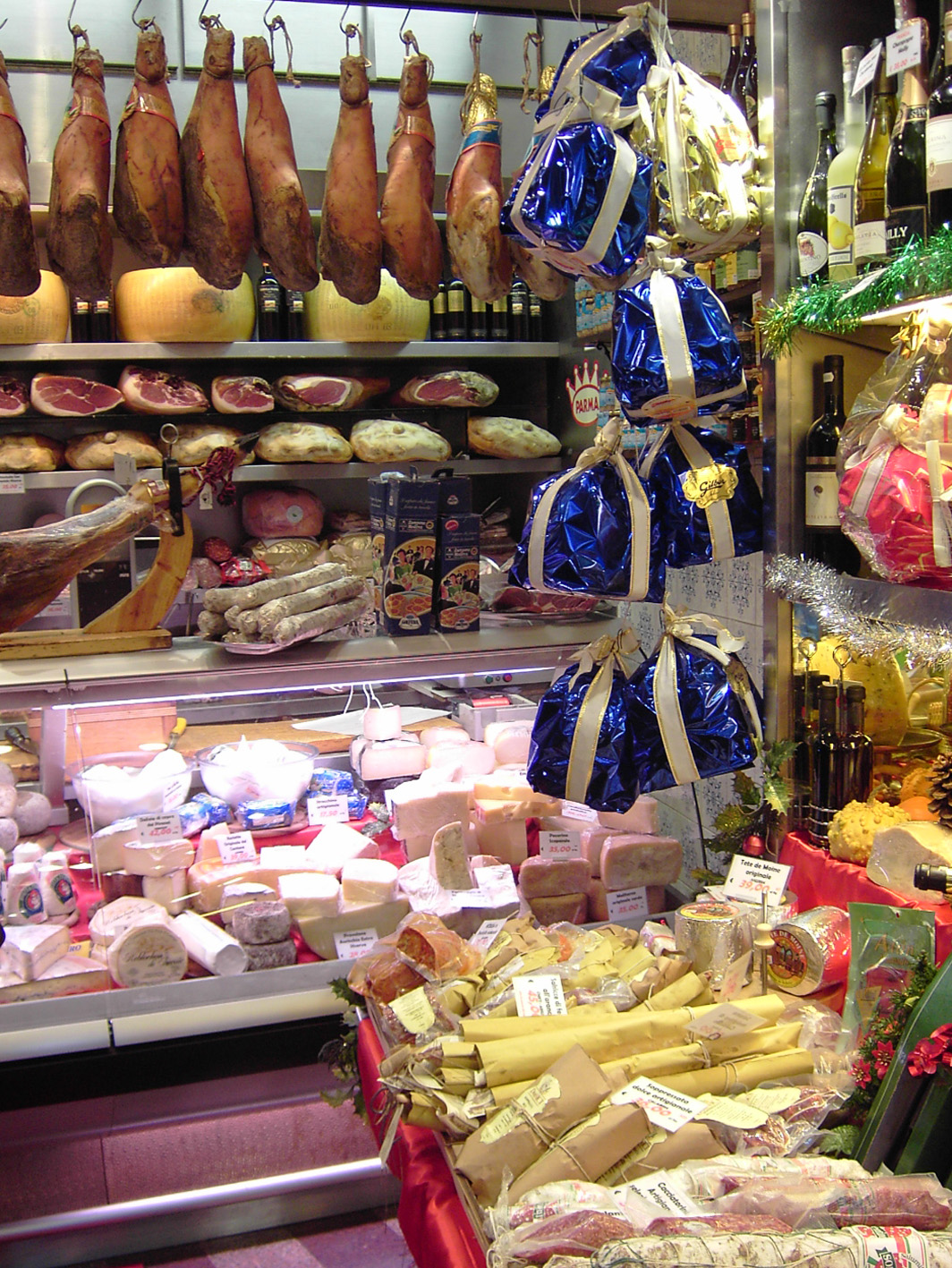
An array of meats and cheeses at an Italian delicatessen in Rome

A delicatessen or deli is a grocery store that sells a selection of fine, exotic, or foreign prepared foods. Delicatessens originated in Germany (contemporary spelling: Delikatessen) during the 18th century and spread to Canada and the United States in the mid-19th century. European immigrants to Canada and the United States, especially Ashkenazi Jews, popularized the delicatessen in North American culture beginning in the late 19th century. Today, many large retail stores like supermarkets have deli sections.

== Etymology ==
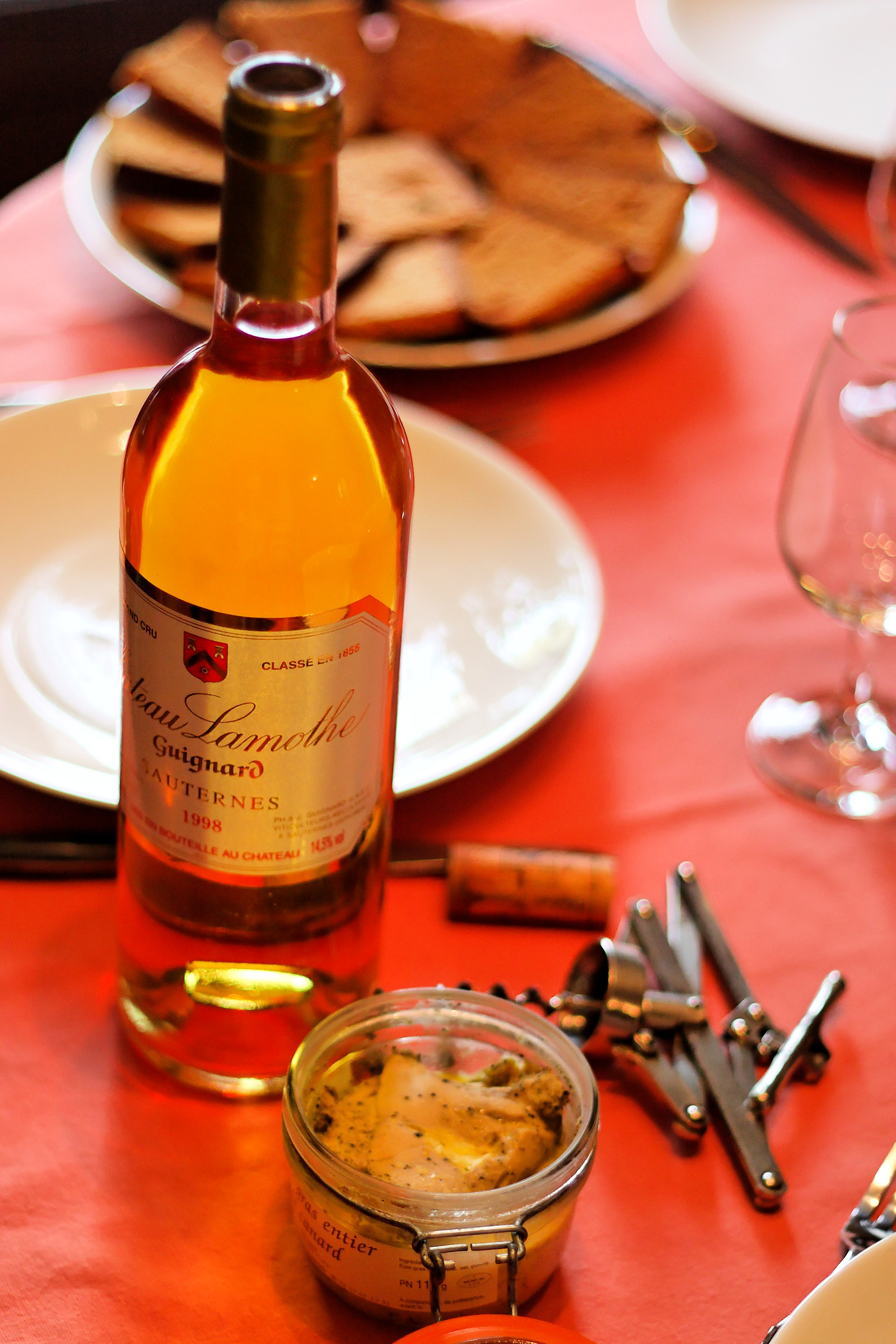
French delicacies sold in delicatessens: foie gras and Sauternes

Delicatessen (meaning Delicacies) is a German loanword which first appeared in English in the late 19th century and is the plural of Delicatesse. The German spelling with a "c" was common at the time the word entered English, but is now considered archaic; present-day German has replaced the "c" with a "k". The German form was borrowed from the French délicatesse, which in turn was borrowed from Italian delicatezza, from delicato. The root of this word is the Latin adjective delicatus, meaning "giving pleasure, delightful, pleasing". The first U.S. short version of this word, deli, probably came into existence after World War II, with the first evidence being from 1948.

== History ==
The German food company Dallmayr traces its history to 1700, when it became the first store to import to the German population bananas, mangoes, and plums from places such as the Canary Islands and China. Over 300 years later, it remains the largest business of its kind in Europe.

The first delicatessen to appear in England was L Teroni and sons. This was opened in 1878. It is still open today but is no longer run by the same family.

The first delicatessens to appear in the United States were in New York City in the early 1880s, with the first advertised use of this word occurring in early 1884 in St. Louis, Missouri, upon the opening of "Sprague's Delicatessen", at first one lunchroom and eventually five popular downtown lunch establishments operating between 1884 and 1906. Early delicatessens in New York catered to the German immigrant population living there. As the German-Jewish population increased in New York City during the mid- to late 1800s, kosher delicatessens began to open; the first was founded in 1889. In the United States, by the late 20th to early 21st centuries, supermarkets, local economy stores, and fast food outlets began using the word (often abbreviated as "deli") to describe sections of their stores. The decline of the deli as an independent retail establishment was most noted in New York City; from a high in the 1930s of about 1,500 Jewish delicatessens, only 15 still existed in 2015.

== By country and region ==
=== Australia ===
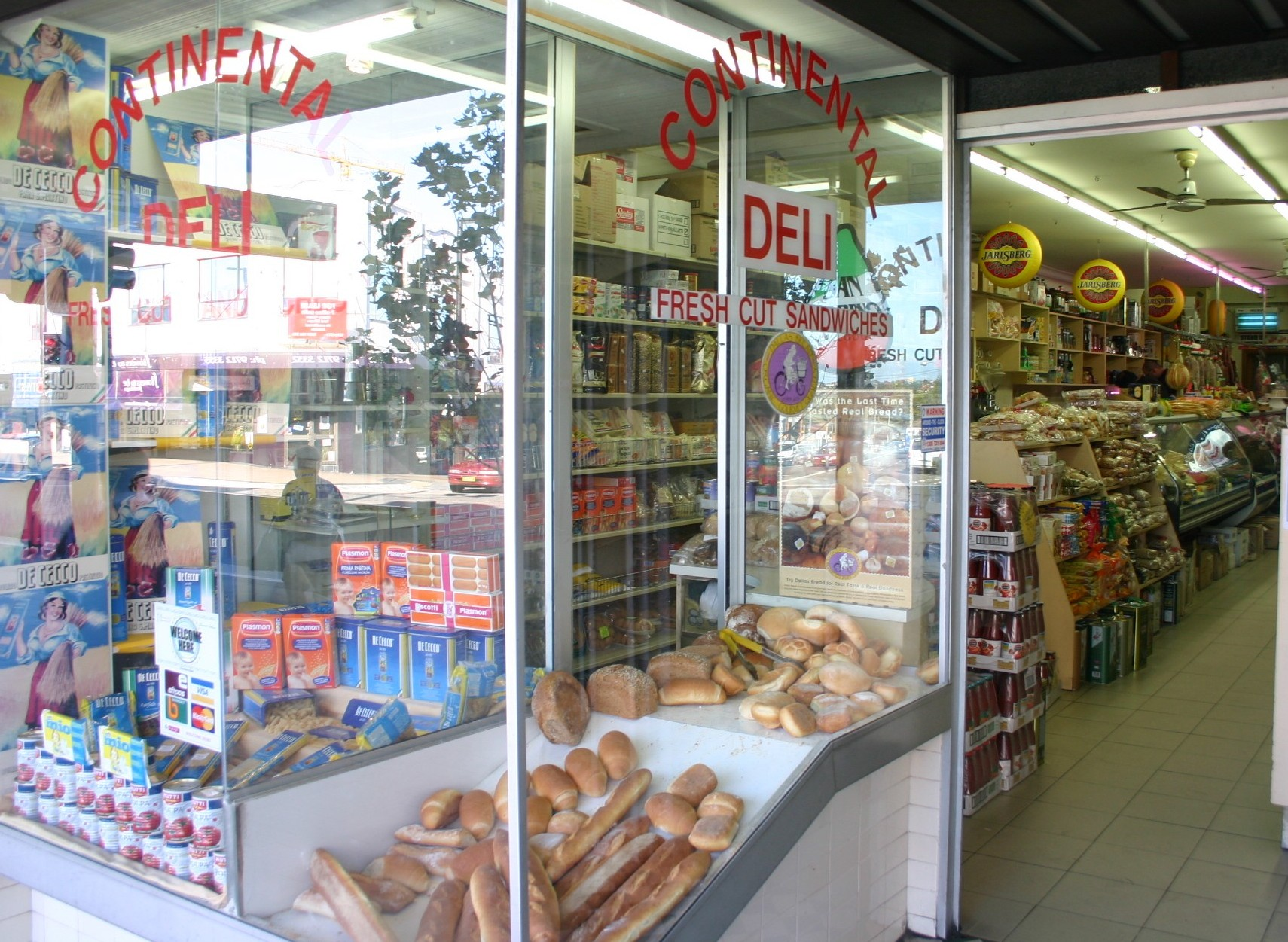
An Italian-style delicatessen in Five Dock, Sydney

In most of Australia, the term "delicatessen" retains its European meaning of high-quality, expensive foods and stores. Large supermarket chains often have a deli department, and independent delicatessens exist throughout the country. Both types of deli offer a variety of cured meats, sausages, pickled vegetables, dips, breads, and olives. In recent years, the popularity of delicatessens in Australia has increased as people have become more interested in local produce and artisanal products. Many delicatessens now work with small producers in various parts of Australia to provide regional specialities, such as smoked salmon from Tasmania, artisan cheeses from Victoria and cured meats from South Australia.

In South Australia and Western Australia, "deli" also denotes a small convenience store or milk bar, and some businesses use "deli" as part of their business name. Traditional delicatessens also exist in these states, with "continental delicatessen" sometimes used to indicate the European version.

=== Canada ===
In Canada, both meanings of "delicatessen" are used. Customers of European origin often use the term in a manner consistent with its original German meaning, but as in the United States, a deli can be a combined grocery store and restaurant.

=== Europe ===
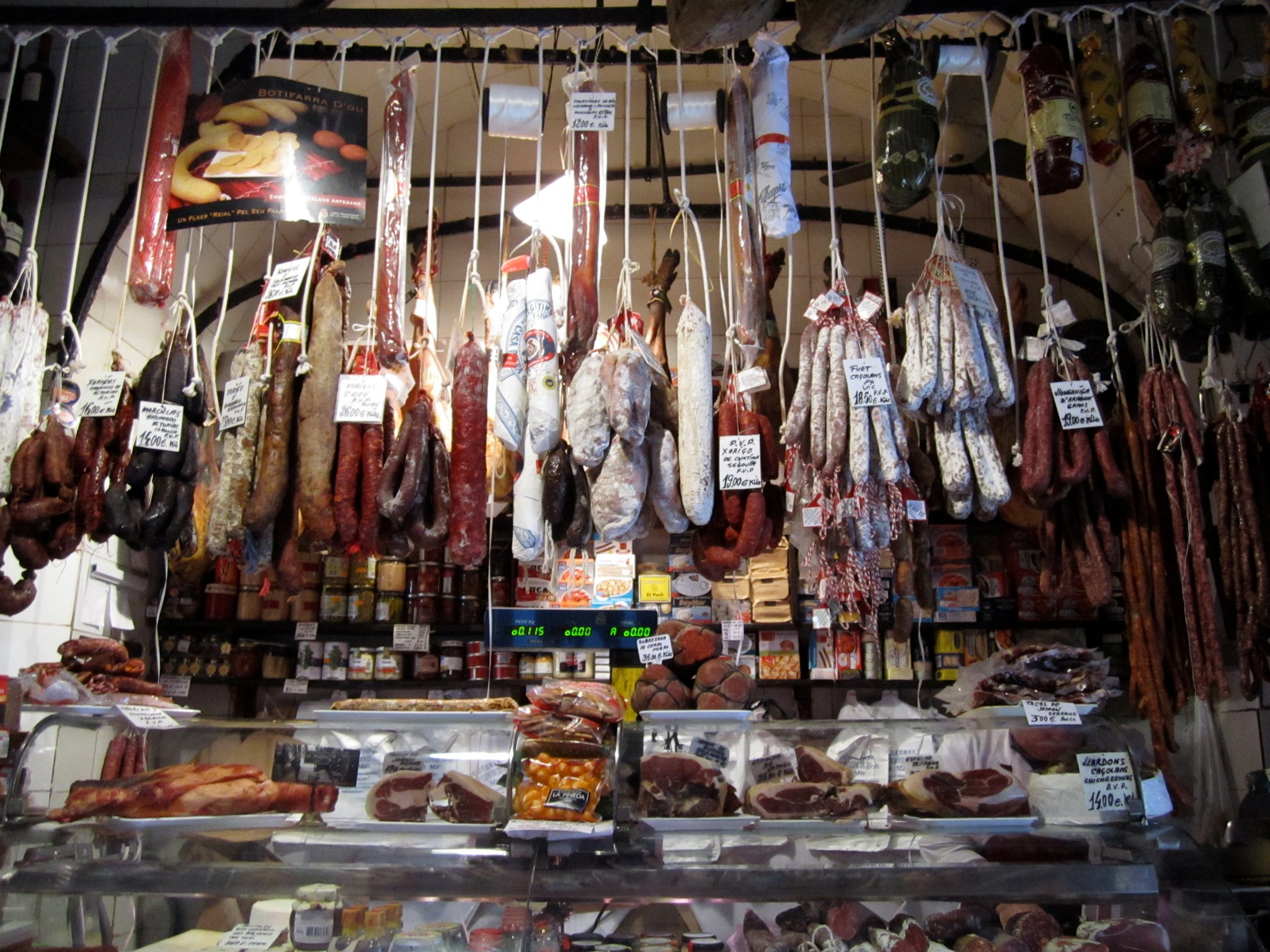
Various delicatessen foods in Vila-seca, Catalonia, Spain

In Europe "delicatessen" means high-quality, expensive foods, and stores. In German-speaking countries a common synonym is Feinkost (fine food), and shops that sell it are called Feinkostläden (delicacy stores). Department stores often have a Delikatessenabteilung (delicacy department). European delicatessens include Fauchon in Paris, Dallmayr in Munich, Julius Meinl am Graben in Vienna, Harrods and Fortnum & Mason in London, Peck in Milan, and Jelmoli in Zürich.

Although U.S.-style delicatessens are also found in Europe, they appeal to the luxury market. In Russia, shops and supermarket sections approximating U.S.-style delis are called kulinariya and offer salads and main courses. Delicate meats and cheeses, cold-cut and sliced hot, are sold in a separate section. The Eliseevsky food store in central Moscow, with its fin de siècle decor, is similar to a European delicatessen. From the Tsarist era, it was preserved by the Soviets as an outlet for difficult-to-obtain Russian delicacies. Delicatessens may also provide foods from other countries and cultures that are not readily available in local food stores. In Italy, the deli can be called gastronomia, negozio di specialità gastronomiche, bottega alimentare and more recently salumeria. In France it is known as a traiteur or épicerie fine.

==== United Kingdom ====
In the United Kingdom, a delicatessen offers a variety of meats and cheeses. It also has options of various salads. There are delicatessen counters in supermarkets as well as in markets and sandwich shops. Delicatessens will make sandwiches to take away though some have an area where you can sit and eat. Items like potato salad, coleslaw, pease pudding and olives are sold by weight. There is often an area that sells jars of chutneys, jams and sauces.

==== Ireland ====
In Ireland, a "deli" or "deli counter" is a food counter serving pre-prepared "food to go" like sandwiches and hot snacks. This trend began in the 1990s and led to the emergence of many ready-to-eat deli products. Delis can be found at a wide variety of convenience shops, newsagents, supermarkets, petrol stations, and casual eateries throughout Ireland.

Popular items served at hot deli counters include chicken fillet rolls (breaded chicken fillet on a bread roll), breakfast rolls (Irish breakfast items on a bread roll), jambons, sausage rolls, and potato wedges.

=== United States ===
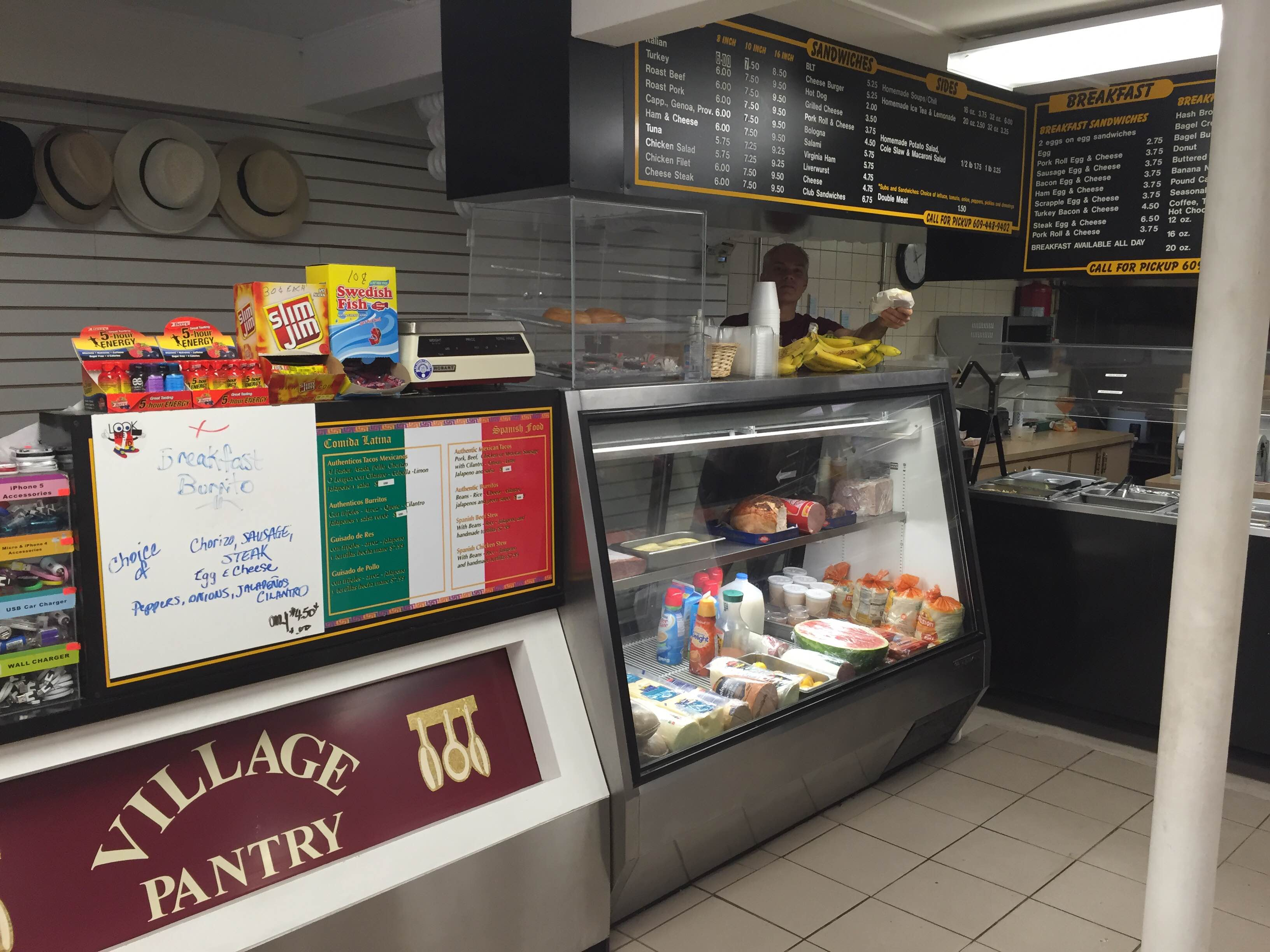
A typical deli in West Windsor Township, New Jersey, in the United States

In the United States, a delicatessen (or deli) can be a simple retail grocery store, a sit-down restaurant, or any combination in between. Sit-down and to-go delis offer a broader, fresher menu than fast-food chains, rarely employing fryers (except for chicken) and routinely preparing sandwiches to order. Delicatessens from a number of cultures can be found in the United States, including Italian, Greek, and Jewish, both kosher and "kosher style". The American equivalent of a European delicatessen may be known as a gourmet food store.

Retail delis in the U.S. sell fresh-sliced cold cuts and cheeses. In addition to made-to-order sandwiches, many American delicatessens offer made-to-order green salads. Prepared pasta, potato, chicken, and tuna salads, or other salads are sometimes displayed under the counter and sold by weight. This is the same as a deli counter in a supermarket in the UK. Precooked chicken, shrimp, or eggplant dishes may also be sold. Some establishments have table seating for patrons to consume sandwiches and other food, while others only sell food to go. Delicatessens offer a variety of beverages, such as pre-packaged or fountain soft drinks, bottled water, coffee, tea, and milk. Potato chips and similar products, newspapers, and small items such as candy and mints are also usually available.

== See also ==
- Appetizing store
- Bodega
- Charcuterie
- Delicacy
- List of delicatessens
- Jewish deli
- Osteria
- Pastrami on rye
- Salumeria
- Salumi
- Save the Deli – a book about the decline of the Jewish delicatessen
- Specialty foods
- Traiteur
- Trattoria
