= Houston Film Critics Society Awards 2022 =

Annual US film awards ceremony

16th Houston Film Critics Society Awards
- Date: February 18, 2023
- Location: Midtown Arts & Theater Center Houston, Texas
- Presented by: Houston Film Critics Society
- Website: houstonfilmcritics.com

The 16th Houston Film Critics Society Awards were announced on February 18, 2023, at the Midtown Arts & Theater Center Houston (MATCH) in Texas. The nominations were announced on January 10, 2023, with The Banshees of Inisherin and Everything Everywhere All at Once leading the nominations with nine each. Both films won the most awards with three each, with Everything Everywhere All at Once winning Best Picture. The nominees for the Texas Independent Film Award were announced on December 7, 2022.

Hosted by local film critics and film industry notables, the event featured live, abridged performances of the five Best Original Song nominees, which went to "Naatu Naatu" from RRR, and the awarding of the Texas Independent Film Award. "As the industry continues to debate how we should experience the magic of film, moviemakers continue to imagine creative stories about compelling people," said Douglas Harris, HFCS President. "This year, the films we honor showcase a community daring to rethink, refresh and reinvent," she concluded.

The performances of the five nominated songs were performed by local performers Sheleah Monea, Cameron Starnes, and Sankar Narayanan, under the direction of music director Scott Benton, and the presence of the Consuls General of Argentina, Belgium, Germany and Korea for the presentation of Best Foreign Language Feature. Following the two-hour production, guests adjourned to the Gallery at MATCH for a reception featuring an Everything Everywhere All at Once-themed bagel buffet courtesy of Ziggy Gruber of "Kenny and Ziggy's New York Delicatessen" and Barry Shapiro of "Bagel Express".

"As we celebrate a year when we rediscovered the joy of the movies, our critics applaud a film that dares to push the art in every possible way," Harris said. "Just as we have in so many previous award years, the Houston Critics look for opportunities to honor filmmakers who dare to bring something new to the screen. Each year, the Society presents our awards after thoroughly reviewing the year's films," she continued. "We select our nominees in December before casting final votes early in the new year. As professional journalists, who believe in the power of film, we are thrilled with the range and substance of this year's winners," Harris concluded.

== Winners and nominees ==
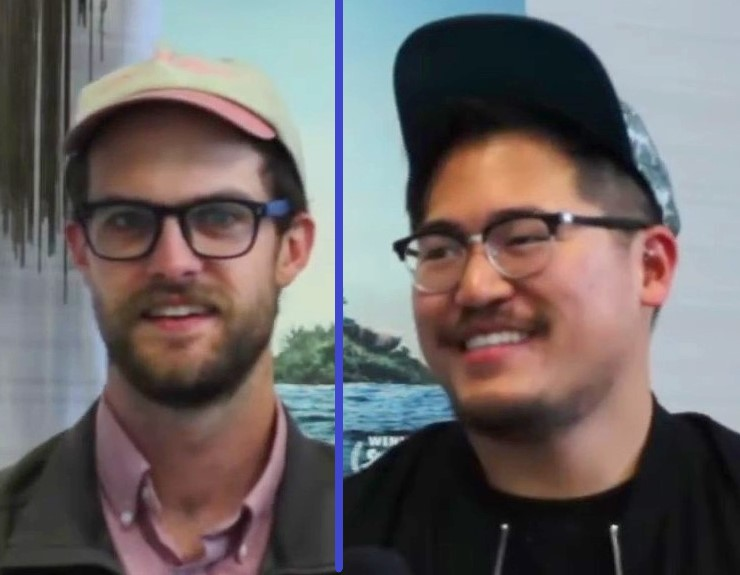
Daniel Scheinert and Daniel Kwan, Best Director winners

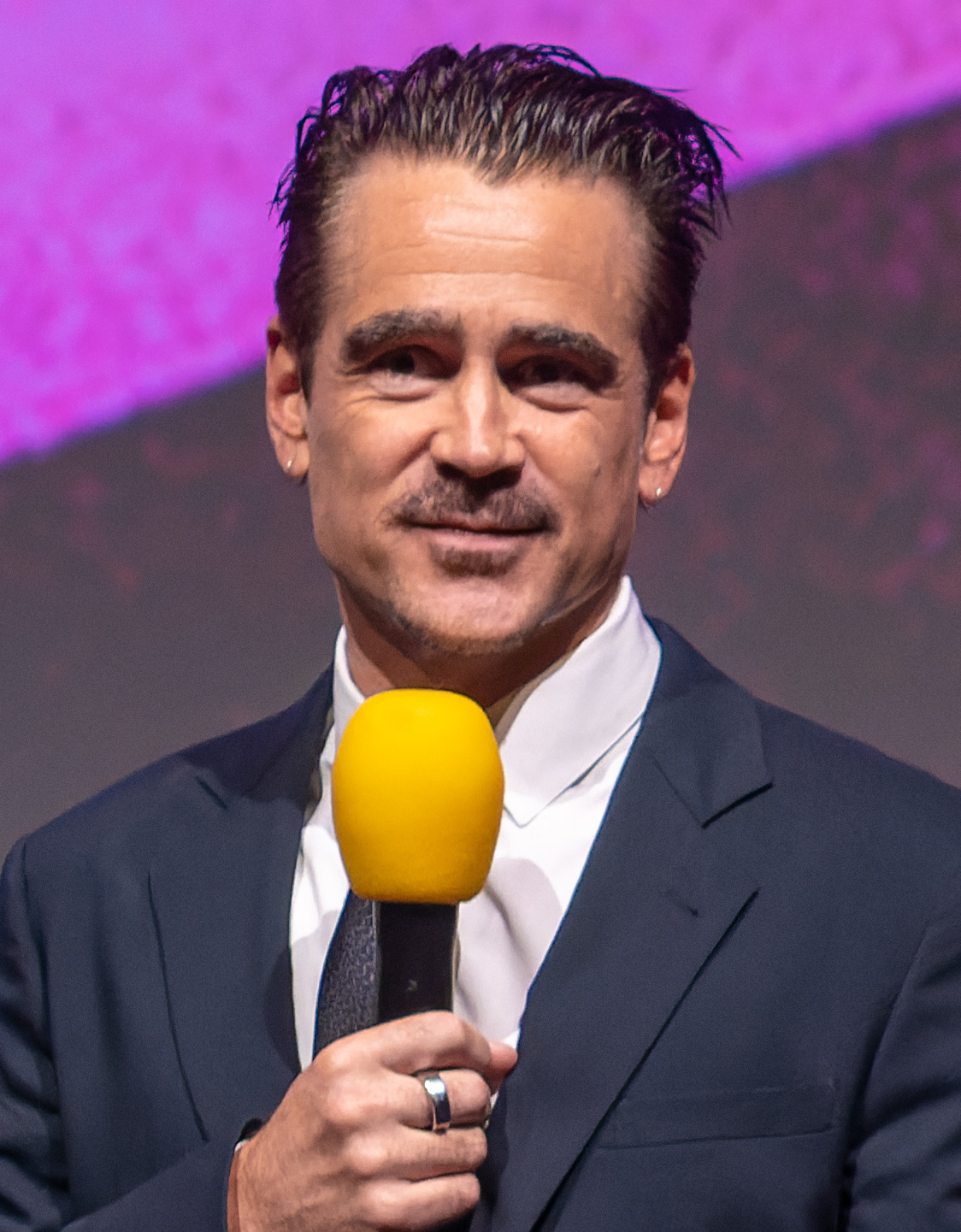
Colin Farrell, Best Actor winner

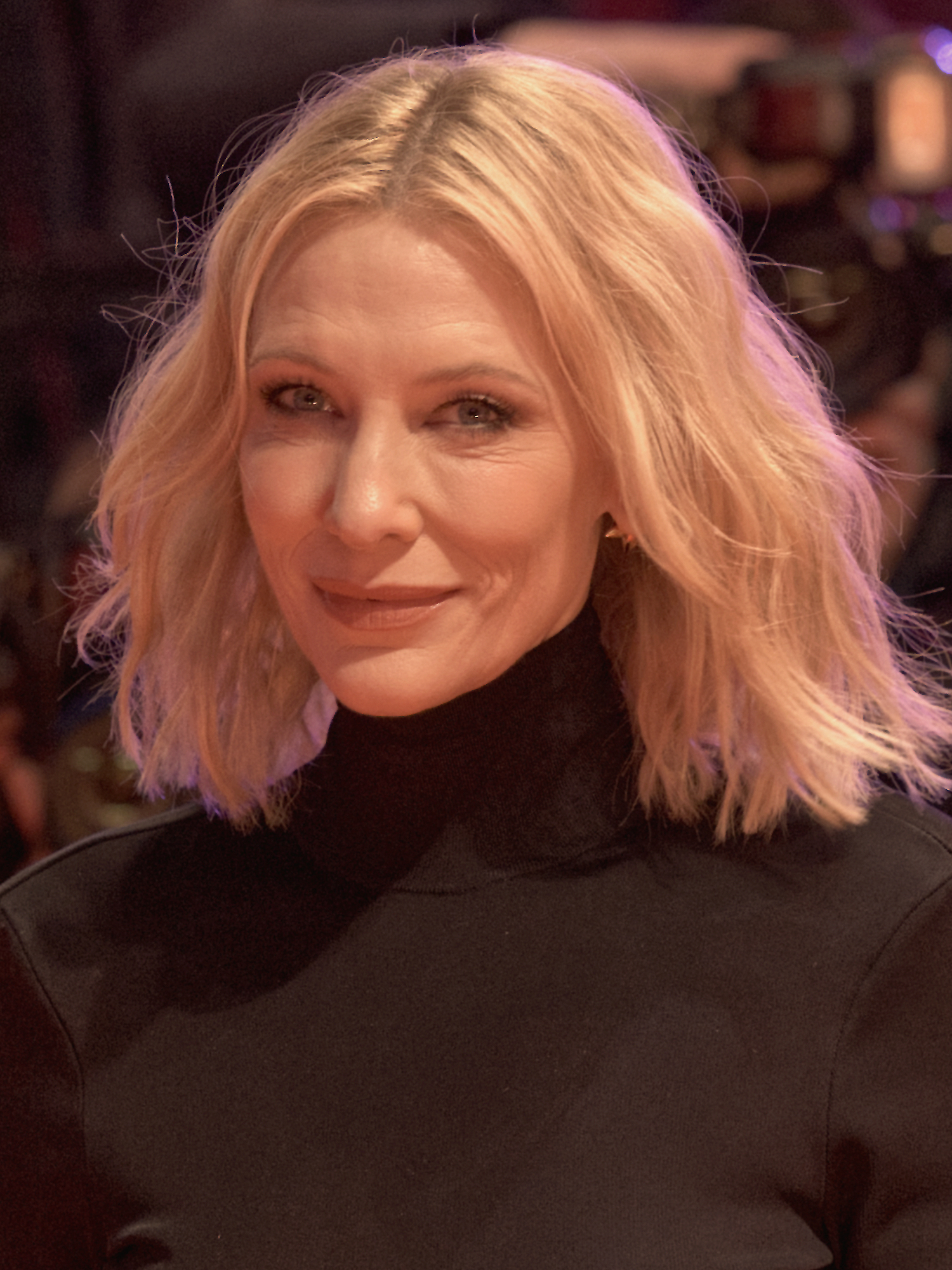
Cate Blanchett, Best Actress winner

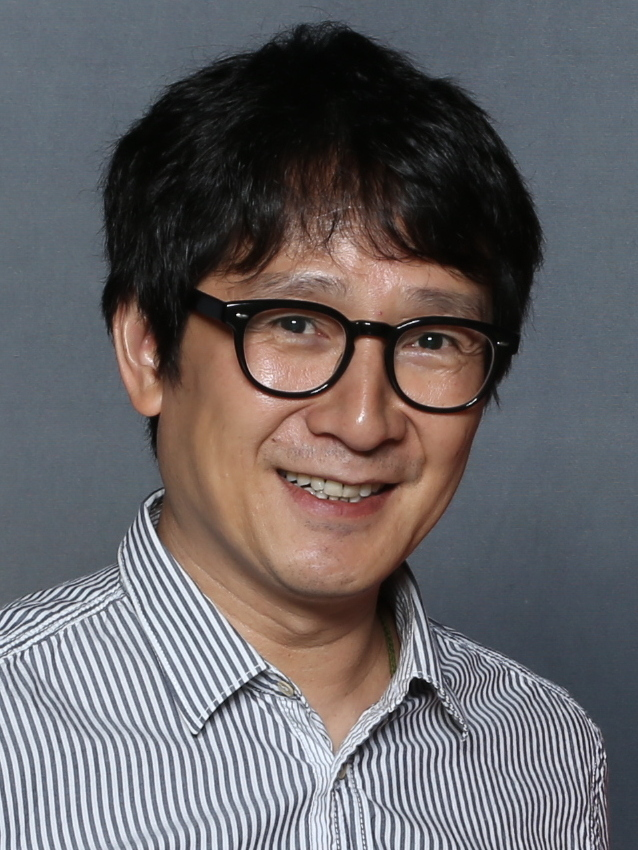
Ke Huy Quan, Best Supporting Actor winner

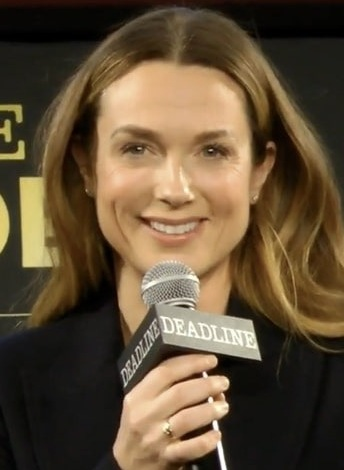
Kerry Condon, Best Supporting Actress winner

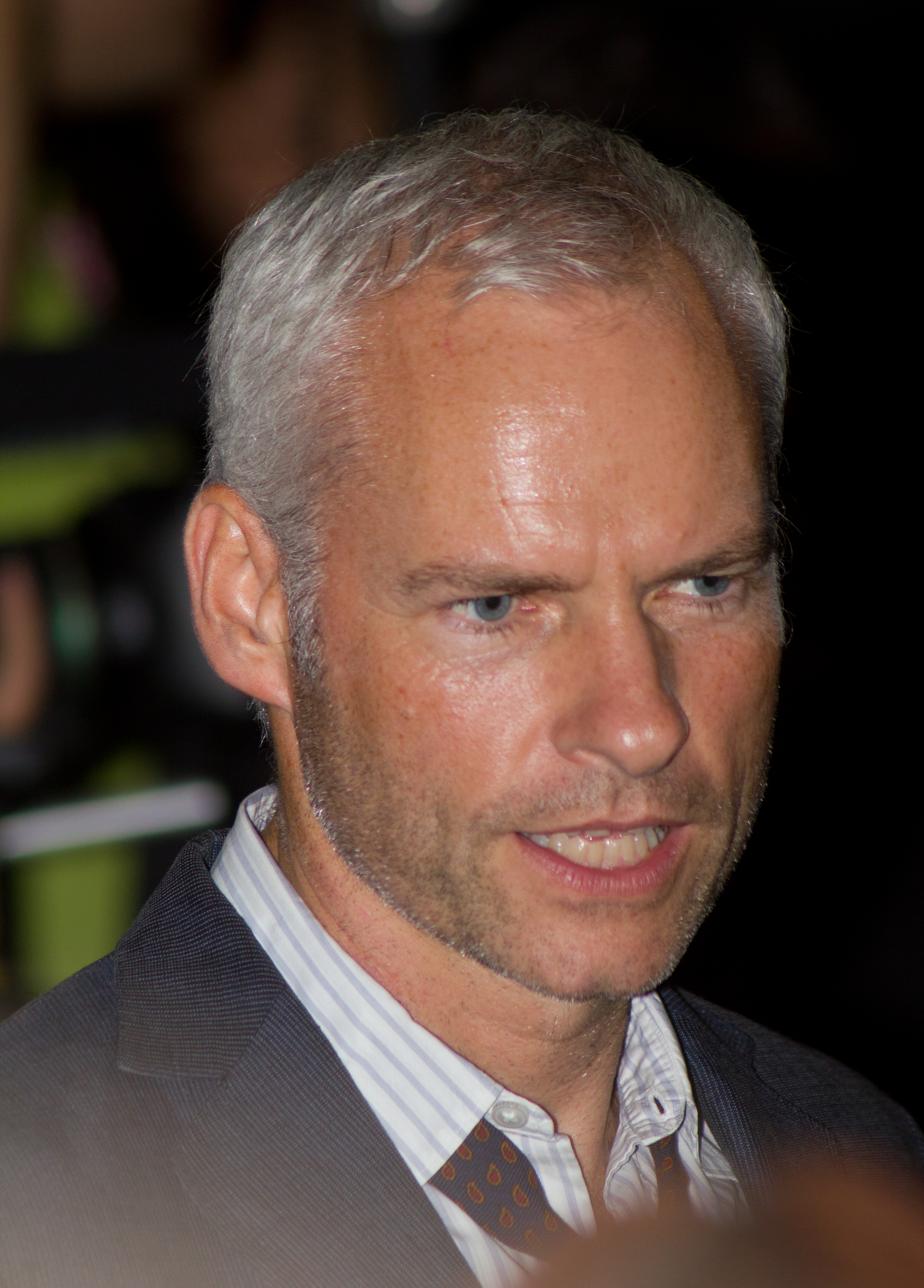
Martin McDonagh, Best Screenplay winner

Winners are listed first and highlighted with boldface.

Best Picture	Best Director
**Everything Everywhere All at Once**; The Banshees of Inisherin; Elvis; The Fabelmans; Guillermo del Toro's Pinocchio; RRR; Tár; Till; Top Gun: Maverick; Women Talking	**Daniel Kwan and Daniel Scheinert – Everything Everywhere All at Once**; Todd Field – Tár; Baz Luhrmann – Elvis; Martin McDonagh – The Banshees of Inisherin; Sarah Polley – Women Talking; Steven Spielberg – The Fabelmans
Best Actor	Best Actress
**Colin Farrell – The Banshees of Inisherin as Pádraic Súilleabháin**; Austin Butler – Elvis as Elvis Presley; Tom Cruise – Top Gun: Maverick as Captain Pete "Maverick" Mitchell; Brendan Fraser – The Whale as Charlie; Jeremy Pope – The Inspection as Ellis French	**Cate Blanchett – Tár as Lydia Tár**; Viola Davis – The Woman King as Nanisca; Danielle Deadwyler – Till as Mamie Till-Mobley; Emma Thompson – Good Luck to You, Leo Grande as Nancy Stokes; Michelle Yeoh – Everything Everywhere All at Once as Evelyn Quan Wang
Best Supporting Actor	Best Supporting Actress
**Ke Huy Quan – Everything Everywhere All at Once as Waymond Wang**; Brendan Gleeson – The Banshees of Inisherin as Colm Doherty; Barry Keoghan – The Banshees of Inisherin as Dominic Kearney; Mark Rylance – Bones and All as Sully; Ben Whishaw – Women Talking as August	**Kerry Condon – The Banshees of Inisherin as Siobhán Súilleabháin**; Jessie Buckley – Women Talking as Mariche; Jamie Lee Curtis – Everything Everywhere All at Once as Deirdre Beaubeirdre; Stephanie Hsu – Everything Everywhere All at Once as Joy Wang / Jobu Tupaki; Janelle Monáe – Glass Onion: A Knives Out Mystery as Helen Brand / Cassandra "Andi" Brand
Best Screenplay	Best Animated Feature
**The Banshees of Inisherin – Martin McDonagh**; Everything Everywhere All at Once – Daniel Kwan and Daniel Scheinert; The Fabelmans – Steven Spielberg and Tony Kushner; Tár – Todd Field; Women Talking – Sarah Polley and Miriam Toews	**Guillermo del Toro's Pinocchio**; Apollo 10 1/2: A Space Age Childhood; Marcel the Shell with Shoes On; Puss in Boots: The Last Wish; Turning Red
Best Documentary Feature	Best Foreign Language Feature
**Good Night Oppy**; All the Beauty and the Bloodshed; Bad Axe; Fire of Love; Navalny	**RRR (India)**; All Quiet on the Western Front (Germany); Argentina, 1985 (Argentina); Close (Belgium); Decision to Leave (South Korea)
Best Original Score	Best Original Song
**Guillermo del Toro's Pinocchio – Alexandre Desplat**; Babylon – Justin Hurwitz; The Banshees of Inisherin – Carter Burwell; Empire of Light – Trent Reznor and Atticus Ross; The Fabelmans – John Williams; Women Talking – Hildur Guðnadóttir	**"Naatu Naatu" – RRR**; "Ciao Papa" – Guillermo del Toro's Pinocchio; "Hold My Hand" – Top Gun: Maverick; "Lift Me Up" – Black Panther: Wakanda Forever; "Stand Up" – Till
Best Cinematography	Best Visual Effects
**Top Gun: Maverick – Claudio Miranda**; Avatar: The Way of Water – Russell Carpenter; Babylon – Linus Sandgren; The Fabelmans – Janusz Kamiński; Nope – Hoyte van Hoytema	**Avatar: The Way of Water**; The Batman; Black Panther: Wakanda Forever; RRR; Top Gun: Maverick
Best Ensemble Cast	Best Stunt Coordination Team
**Women Talking**; The Banshees of Inisherin; Everything Everywhere All at Once; The Fabelmans; Glass Onion: A Knives Out Mystery	**RRR**; The Batman; Everything Everywhere All at Once; Top Gun: Maverick; The Woman King
Texas Independent Film Award
**Apollo 10 1/2: A Space Age Childhood: Richard Linklater imagines how a fourth grader would feel landing on the Moon**; Acid Test: Jennifer Waldo explores a young woman's journey to discover her next steps; Conception: Tarun Verma asks if a marriage can survive the emotional and physical toll of IVF; Deep in the Heart: A Texas Wildlife Story: Ben Masters savors the Lone Star State's beauty; Facing Nolan: Bradley Jackson celebrates the life and career of baseball legend Nolan Ryan
