= Ziggy Gruber =

American chef (born 1969)

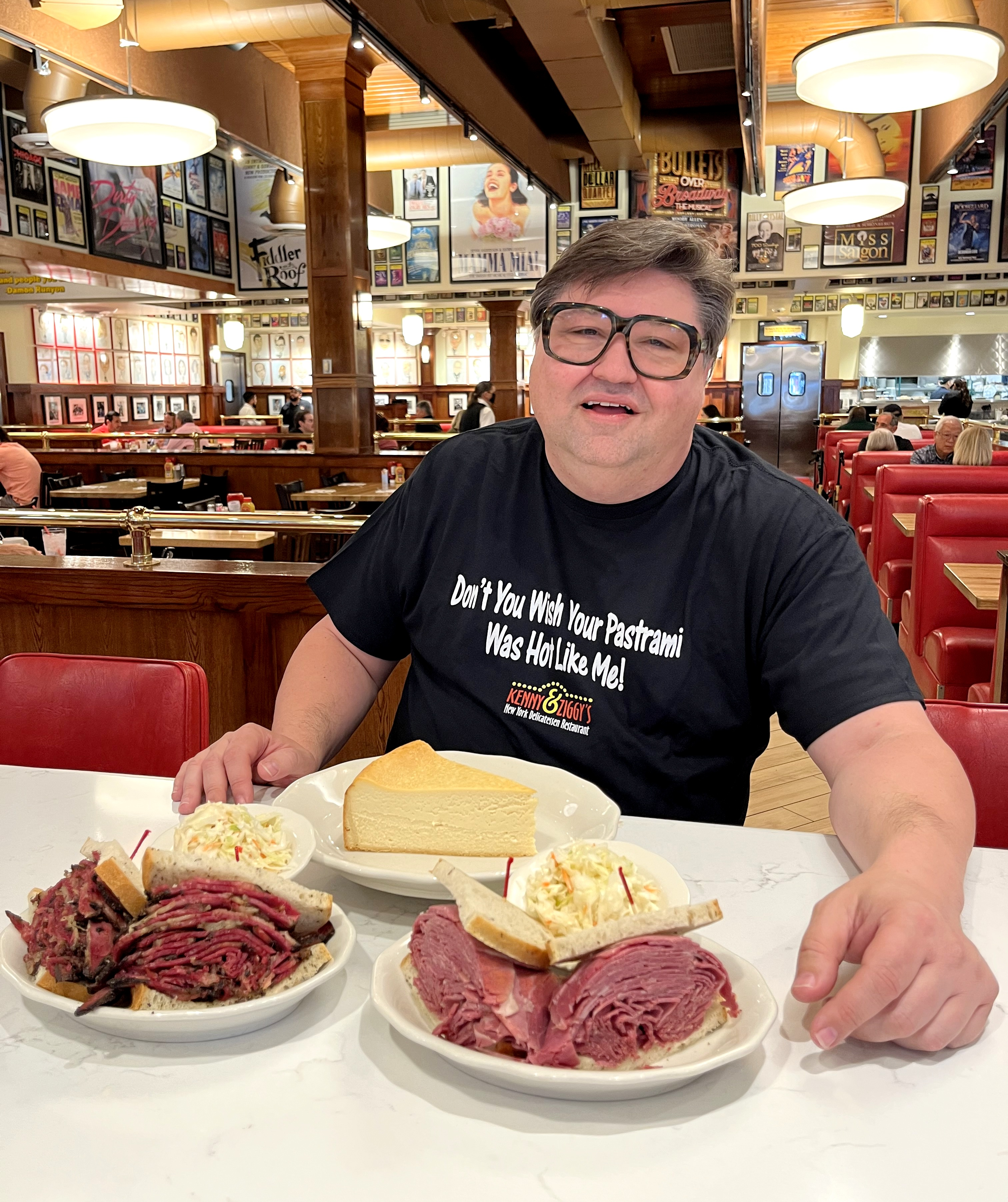
Ziggy Gruber at Kenny & Ziggy's New York Delicatessen Restaurant & Bakery

David Gruber, known as Ziggy Gruber(born 1969), is an American chef and restaurateur known for his role in preservation of Jewish deli traditions. He is a restaurant owner, deli maven of Kenny & Ziggy's New York Delicatessen Restaurant in Houston, Texas and featured in the documentary "Deli Man." Also, Ziggy has frequently appeared on food television programs like Diners, Drive-Ins & Dives. He is a third generation Jewish deli owner and has run three delis.

== Early life and education ==
Ziggy Gruber was born to Pam and Eugene Gruber. He is the older of two sons born to the couple, the younger son being Jonathan Mackye Gruber, a screenwriter known professionally as J. Mackye Gruber. Eugene Gruber was a deli owner in New York City as was his father, Max Gruber.

The first Gruber deli man, Ziggy's grandfather Max, arrived in New York City sometime in the early 1900s from Budapest, Hungary. Max worked in several delis around New York City. In 1927, together with brothers-in-law Morris and Izzy Rappaport, they opened The Rialto Deli, which was the first deli to open its doors on Broadway.

At age 12, Ziggy’s father Eugene entered the deli business with his father Max. With help from his brother, Seymour, Eugene opened Genard’s on Madison Avenue. Genard's was opened for three decades.

By the time Ziggy was 8, the family had moved to Spring Valley, New York, where Seymour and Eugene owned a deli named Cresthill Kosher Deli. It was Ziggy's grandfather who decided it was time for him to learn more about the business. Ziggy's cousin Norman, also a deli owner, taught him about catering and marketing.

Ziggy enrolled at Le Cordon Bleu London at age 15. He graduated at the top of his class and spent the next two years working in London's three-star Michelin restaurants, Le Gavroche and The Waterside Inn. He cooked for the Queen Elizabeth II of England.

== Professional career ==
=== Chef, restaurateur, and advocate for preserving culinary traditions for Jewish Delis ===
When Ziggy returned to the United States, Ziggy and his dad ran the Spring Valley business, Cresthill Kosher Deli. Ziggy stayed until the early 1990s and then went to California and opened Ziggy G's on Sunset Boulevard. The Gruber deli served clientele like Johnny Depp, Warren Beatty, Annette Bening, Leonardo DiCaprio, and Dennis Hopper.

Freddy Klein, former owner of Carnegie Deli and a restaurant broker, introduced Ziggy to Lenny Friedman, a real estate developer, and his son Kenny. Lenny wanted to bring a New York deli food to Houston. Kenny & Ziggy's New York Delicatessen Restaurant & Bakery opened in 1999. In 2004, Kenny left the business. Lenny Friedman remains Ziggy's business partner.

Ziggy has appeared on several culinary television programs, including TV shows like "Diners, Drive-Ins & Dives", where his restaurant Kenny & Ziggy's, was highlighted. He was included in David Sax’s 2009 book "Save the Deli," and "Deli Man" (2015), a national film documentary by Director Erik Greenberg Anjou ("A Cantor’s Tale" and "Road to Ruin") that raised the alarm on how delicatessens, an integral part of every Jewish community in the first half of the 20th Century, may soon be history. It is a look at the men behind the food behind the tradition of delicatessens in Jewish culture. It includes delis from all regions of the country, featuring Ziggy and Kenny & Ziggy's as a place the film's producer calls "the finest delicatessen restaurant in the U.S."

“Deli Man" premiered in Houston on February 24, 2015, and was declared Ziggy Gruber Day in Houston by Mayor Annise Parker to commemorate the day. Ziggy attended documentary premiere events in cities across the country.

The story of the loss of the traditional deli was further chronicled in the national exhibit “I’ll Have What She’s Having” started by the Skirball Cultural Center in Los Angeles and traveling throughout the county, displaying the history of the American deli. Ziggy loaned part of his vintage deli menu collection to the exhibit. He also participated in a Q&A session/lecture following a screening of "Deli Man" at the Skirball Museum during the exhibit in July 2022.

Community Impact with National Deli Month

The disappearance of so many delis prompted Ziggy to organize an effort to bring more attention to the remaining delis and their culinary and cultural importance. In 2016, Ziggy Gruber, in collaboration with Jay Parker, former owner of Ben's Best Deli in Rego Park, New York, founded National Deli Month to be an annual celebration of delis, held during the month of August. It is an effort by delicatessens to bring attention to an American institution rapidly disappearing from our culture. From August 1–31, participating delis offer prix fixe menus or specials on their signature dishes that provide a chance to try traditional deli dishes and raise money for a charity of their choice in their local community.

In Houston, Kenny & Ziggy's offers a three-course menu for National Deli Month, with a portion of the proceeds benefitting Holocaust Museum Houston. During the month, Ziggy also hosts a private Holocaust survivors Luncheon for all Holocaust survivors in the area and their descendants.

=== Recognition and awards ===
- "Save the Deli". Kenny & Ziggy's and Ziggy Gruber are included in the book Save the Deli: In Search of Perfect Pastrami, Crusty Rye, and the Heart of Jewish Delicatessen, published by Canadian journalist David Sax in 2009 about the decline of the Jewish delicatessen.
- "1,000 Foods To Eat Before You Die". Book by noted food writer Mimi Sherton, published in 2015.
- Houston Chef of the Month for March: Ziggy Gruber

=== Media appearances ===
- "Diners, Drive-Ins & Dives" on Food Network – season 7, episode 6 ("You Picked ‘Em")
- "Diners, Drive-Ins & Dives" on Food Network – season 33, episode 12 ("Takeout: Comin' from All Over the Map”)
- "Samantha Brown’s Places to Love" – Season 5, episode 1 (January 29, 2022)
- "Triple D Nation" on Food Network – November 12, 2021, "Creative Comfort"
- "Eat Like a Local" on KPRC Channel 2, 2024
- "Texas Eats" – KSAT television show feature, 2023
- "Good Taste with Tanji" – Texas’ Very Own NYC Style Deli: Kenny & Ziggy’s, February 19, 2018, Stacked to the Sky, November 7, 2020
- "Food Paradise" on Travel Channel
- "All You Can Eat" on History Channel – season 1
- Houston Chronicle video feature – 2024
- Food Network – Top Places to Eat
- Wine Enthusiast – 14 Essential Bars in Houston, According to Industry Pros, December 20, 2024
- New York Times – Couple lost at Sea Dine at Kenny & Ziggy's, July 30, 2024
- AFAR magazine – restaurant listings, September 4, 2014
- Texas Highways – Kenny & Ziggy's Serves Classics, April 2022
- Conde Nast Traveler – Best Jewish Delis in America, April 22, 2016
- Tasting Table & Yahoo.com – 15 Iconic Pastrami Sandwiches, March 13, 2024
- AOL – Best Joints for Pastrami Sandwich in America – June 10, 2024
- Bon Viveur – Pastrami: qué es, cuál es su origen y cómo se elabora, January 30, 2024
- Voyage Houston – Meet Ziggy Gruber, July 18, 2018
- iHeart – This Texas Eatery Is Among The Best Delis Across America, October 24, 2022
- Boston.com – Guy Fieri shares his Houston food faves for Super Bowl weekend, February 4, 2017
- Chron.com – Shaquille O’Neal and Guy Fieri Visit Kenny & Ziggy's, February 3, 2017
- The Nosher – Everything Is Bigger in Texas – Including This Jewish Deli, January 13, 2022
- The New York Times – review of "Deli Man," March 5, 2015
- Los Angeles Times – review of "Deli Man," March 5, 2015
- The Times of Israel – Pastrami on wry with the Texan macher keeping deli culture alive, February 25, 2015
- Bon Appetit – "Follow That Brisket", April 2016
- Food & Wine – Best Delis in America, June 16, 2016
- Eater – Essential 38 Restaurants in Houston, 2014
- SYSCO Foodie – Kenny & Ziggy's New York Delicatessen: A Fresh, Fun Take on Dining that’s Rooted in Tradition
- FoodChallenges.com – Kenny & Ziggy's Zelegabetsky sandwich
- Los Angeles Times – Mind-Boggling Variety From Ziggy G's Deli, June 20, 1995

== Current restaurants ==
Kenny & Ziggy's New York Delicatessen Restaurant & Bakery (Houston)
