= David Sax =

Canadian journalist

David Sax (born 1979) is a Canadian journalist. Born in Toronto, Ontario, Sax has written for publications such as New York Magazine, Vanity Fair, Bloomberg Business Week, The New York Times, Saveur, NPR, GQ and Toronto Life.

== Books ==
Sax is the author of several books, including The Revenge of Analog, which was named one of Michiko Kakutani's Best Books of 2016 in the New York Times, The Tastemakers, and Save the Deli, a book that examines the recent decline of the Jewish Delicatessen and puts forward a case for saving it. His book, The Soul of an Entrepreneur, was published by PublicAffairs in April 2020.

== Awards and honors ==
Sax's book "Save the Deli" won the James Beard award.
