= Dallmayr =

German food corporation

Alois Dallmayr KG
- Type: limited commercial partnership
- Industry: Delicatessen, Gastronomy, Vending, Catering
- Founded: 1700
- Headquarters: Munich
- Key people: personally liable partners: Wolfgang Wille; Florian Randlkofer
- Revenue: around 900 Mil. EUR (2014)
- Number of employees: 3,500 (2014), 2.000 in Germany
- Website: www.dallmayr.com

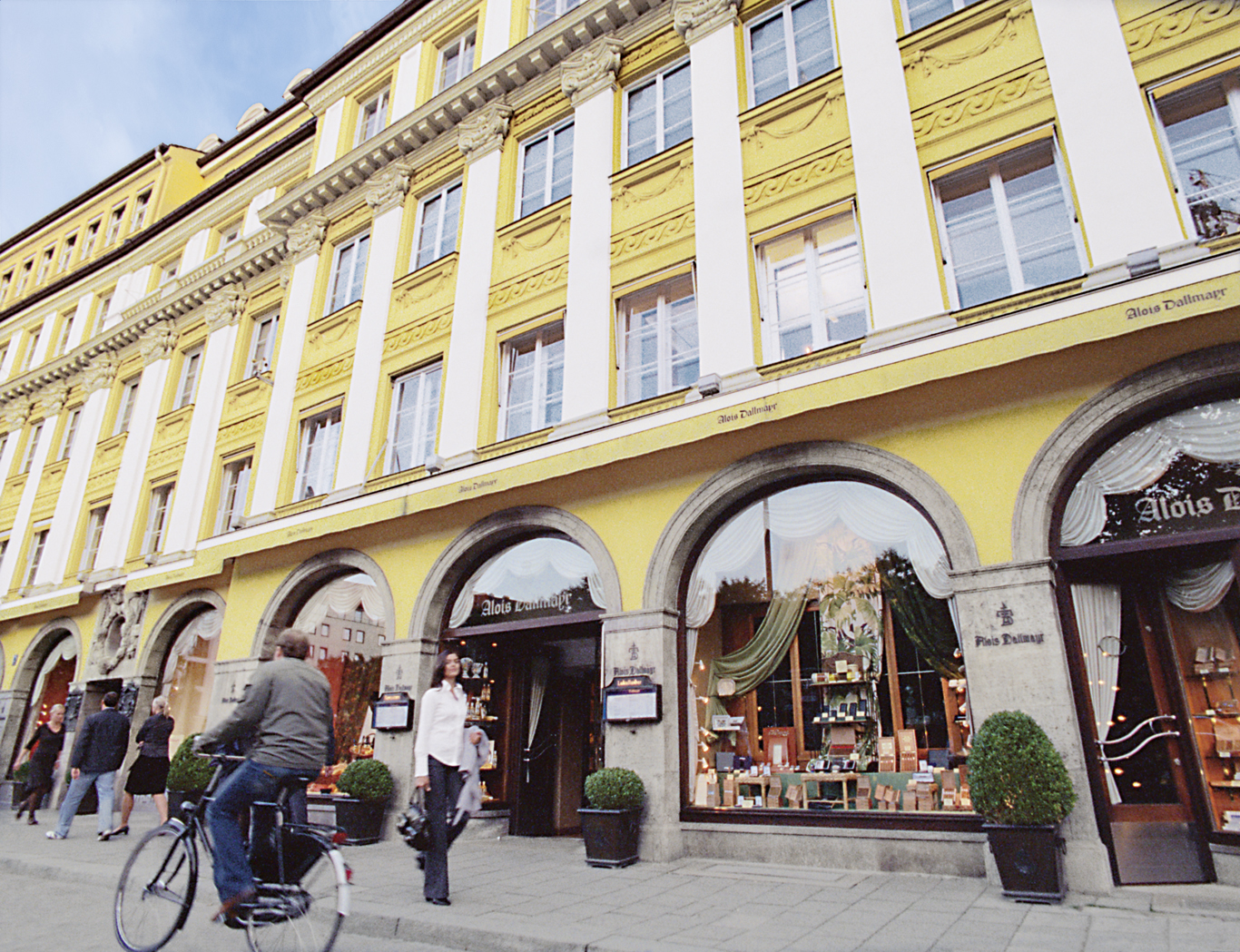
Dallmayr "Stammhaus" at Dienerstraße 14–15, Munich

Alois Dallmayr, usually abbreviated to Dallmayr, is the largest delicatessen business in Europe and one of the best-known German coffee brands: The company has a history of over 300 years and is still in family ownership today. The corporate group has meanwhile been divided into four business units: "Delicatessen and Gastronomy" (which includes the Stammhaus (original store) in Munich, attracting around 2.8 million visitors per year), "Party & Catering," "Coffee & Tea" and finally "Vending & Office" (i.e. the sale of drinks and snack vending machines).

== History ==
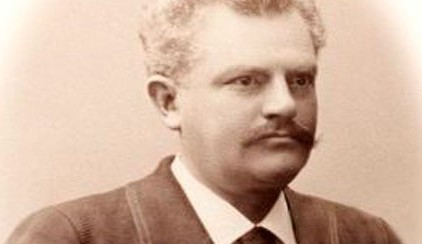
Alois Dallmayr

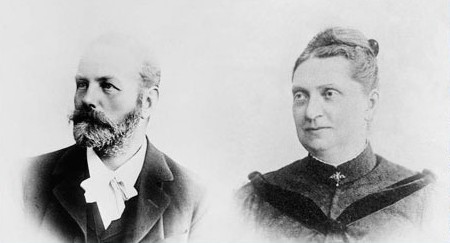
Anton and Therese Randlkofer

The origins of the company can be traced back to the year 1700. At this time, the Munich merchant Christian Reitter ran a business that is considered the direct precursor of the present company. Around 1870 the business came into the ownership of Alois Dallmayr, whose name the company still bears today. He sold the business to Therese and Anton Randlkofer in 1895. Under the management of Therese, a remarkable businesswoman for that time, the Stammhaus (original store) developed into one of the leading delicatessen houses in Europe, with no less than 15 royal purveyor titles. In 1933, Dallmayr's coffee era began: In this year, a coffee merchant from Bremen, Konrad Werner Wille, came to Munich and established a specialist coffee department in the "Delikatessenhaus Dallmayr" that still exists today, which has achieved international renown, amongst other things, due to the television advertisement for Dallmayr Prodomo. The coffee business developed so successfully that in 1985 it was established as a spin-off, the independent subsidiary Alois Dallmayr Kaffee OHG, which represents "Coffee & Tea," now the largest business unit in the company. The Nestlé corporate group acquired an interest in Alois Dallmayr Kaffee OHG to 50%; this was reduced to 25% in 2003. In July 2015, it was agreed that the remaining coffee sector shares should be re-purchased from Nestlé by Alois Dallmayr KG, but that cooperation was to be continued in sales.

== The Dallmayr company today ==
=== Facts and figures ===
Today, the Alois Dallmayr company headquarters is located in Dienerstraße 14–15 in Munich’s old town. Florian Randlkofer and Wolfgang Wille both hold responsibility as personally liable shareholders of the parent company, Alois Dallmayr KG. The Dallmayr Group achieved a turnover of around €900 million for the fiscal year 2014, of which at least €500 million was generated in the "Coffee & Tea" business unit, €360 million in the "Vending & Office" business unit and €40 million in the "Delicatessen and Gastronomy" and "Party & Catering" business units.

The company employs approximately 3,500 employees worldwide, around 2,000 of whom are located in Germany. Dallmayr produces approximately 57,000 tonnes of roast coffee annually at five locations in Germany (Munich, Berlin, Braunschweig, Bremen and Dortmund). The "Vending & Office" branch of the company operates in 14 countries throughout Europe and in the United Arab Emirates.

In December 2009, the Bundeskartellamt (Federal Cartel Office) imposed a fine on Dallmayr and other companies such as Melitta, Tchibo and Kraft due to illegal price fixing, the so-called Kaffeekartell (coffee cartel).^{[7]}

=== Public commitment and sustainability ===
Dallmayr is a member of the Common Code for the Coffee Community and supports the Karlheinz Böhm Stiftung Menschen für Menschen (Karlheinz Böhm foundation Humans for Humans) and the Jane Goodall Institute. Some coffee types bear the UTZ certified seal, the Biosiegel (organic label), the Fairtrade certification mark and the logo of the Rainforest Alliance. Furthermore, Dallmayr donates five tree seedlings for every pound sold of their "Ethiopia" coffee type, to help prevent the desertification of the ground in Ethiopia. In 2011, Dallmayr developed the first sustainable vending machine.

== Business units within the company today ==
=== Delicatessen and gastronomy ===
==== The Stammhaus (original store) in Munich ====
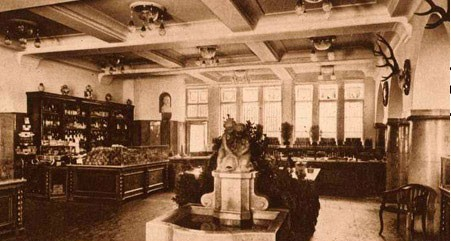
Dallmayr store, 1912

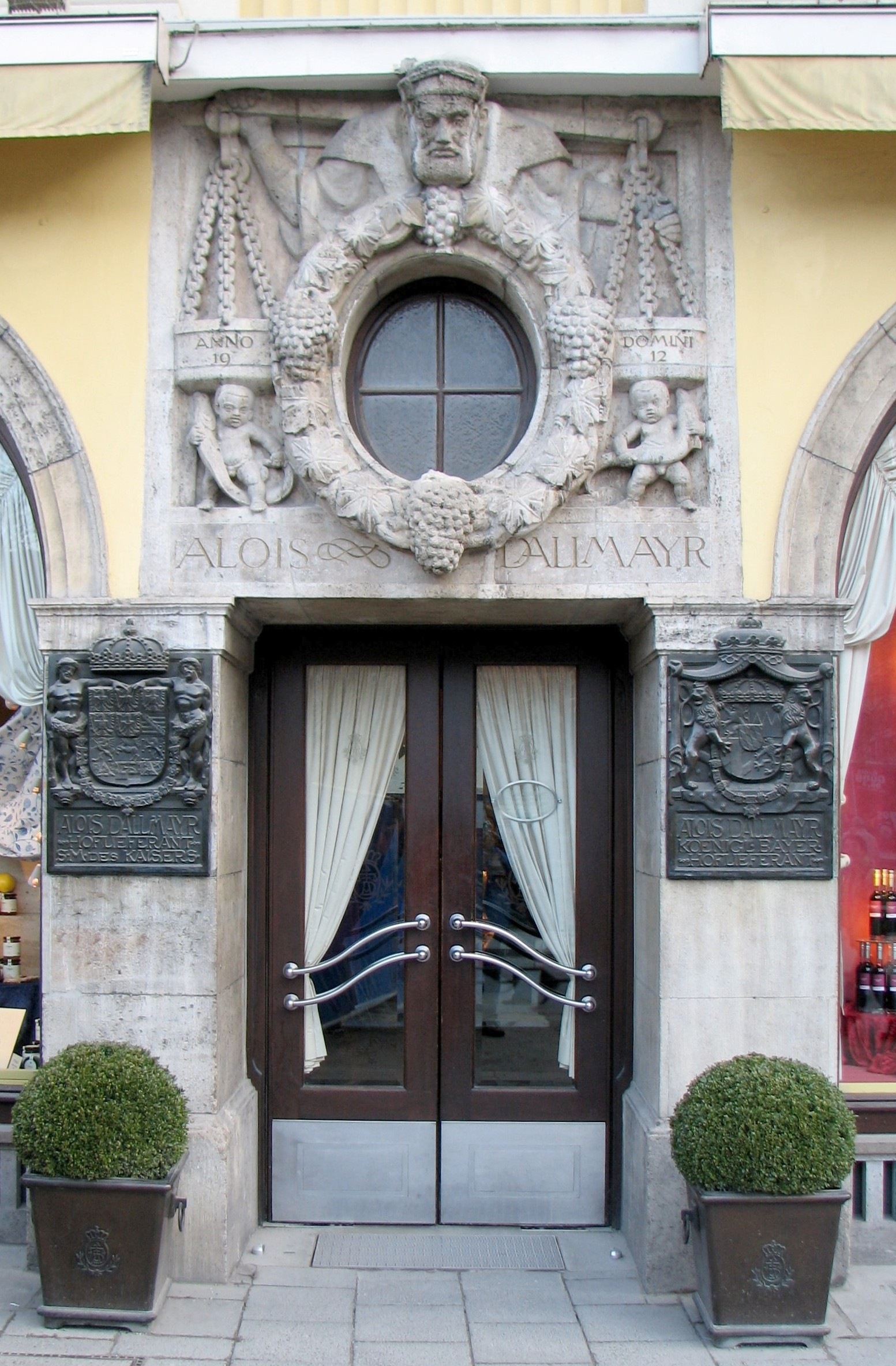
One of the three entrances

"Der Dallmayr", as the Stammhaus in Munich is known, is the largest delicatessen house in Europe. The store is divided into 19 specialist departments (e.g. coffee, pralines, wine, sausage & ham, fruit & vegetable, fish, cheese, bread, pasta, meat, cold & warm buffet, tea, etc.). Due to the television advertisement for the brand Prodomo, the coffee department is the best-known of the departments: Just as in the advertisement, the coffee is still weighed with beam scales today. In the centre of the shop is the Putten (cherubs) fountain, in which crayfish wait to be sold. To a large extent, the goods offered in the Stammhaus are self-produced: On the second floor, there is a production kitchen, in which 70 chefs create gourmet salads, dishes for the warm buffet and cream cakes. The wine department, in which wines in particular from France, Italy, Germany and Austria are sold, was re-designed in 2008. What Dallmayr cannot produce on-site for reasons of space – such as smoked salmon or chocolate – is produced in their own factories in and around Munich. In Dallmayr's praline factory near Munich, more than 40 tonnes of handmade pralines and fruit jellies are produced annually in around 70 different varieties. Furthermore, on 29 June 2003, Dallmayr opened a shop in Terminal 2 of Munich airport, to which a café is also attached. This shop is located behind the security checks, and is only open to air passengers with valid boarding cards.

===== Restaurant Dallmayr =====
The "Dallmayr" restaurant, which focusses on classic-modern cuisine, provides seating for a maximum of 40 people and is located in the first floor of the Stammhaus. It was re-opened in 2006 and is one of the three Munich restaurants that have been accredited with two Michelin stars. Chef de cuisine is Diethard Urbansky. The wine list includes more than 700 items.

===== Café-Bistro Dallmayr =====
On the first floor of the Stammhaus, there is also a café-bistro which provides visitors with a classic coffee house atmosphere and a clear view of the Liebfrauendom (Munich Cathedral), the landmark of Munich. Apart from French cream cakes and in-house coffee and tea specialities, classics such as bouillabaisse or "lobster thermidor" and light lunch dishes are offered. An extensive breakfast menu rounds off the range.

===== Lukullusbar =====
The so-called "Lukullusbar" is also located in the store, and is based on a French market: For example, rock oysters on ice and champagne are available here.

===== Mail order and gift service =====
The Stammhaus includes its own packaging station, in which Dallmayr delicatessen items are packaged in gift wrapping. Furthermore, Dallmayr operates an online shop, which delivers products worldwide.

=== Dallmayr Party & Catering ===
Dallmayr already had a long tradition as purveyor to the court for numerous royal families. The catering range also includes events with several thousand visitors, and therefore Dallmayr organised, for example, the wedding of Georg Friedrich Prince of Prussia and Sophie Princess of Isenburg in August 2011.

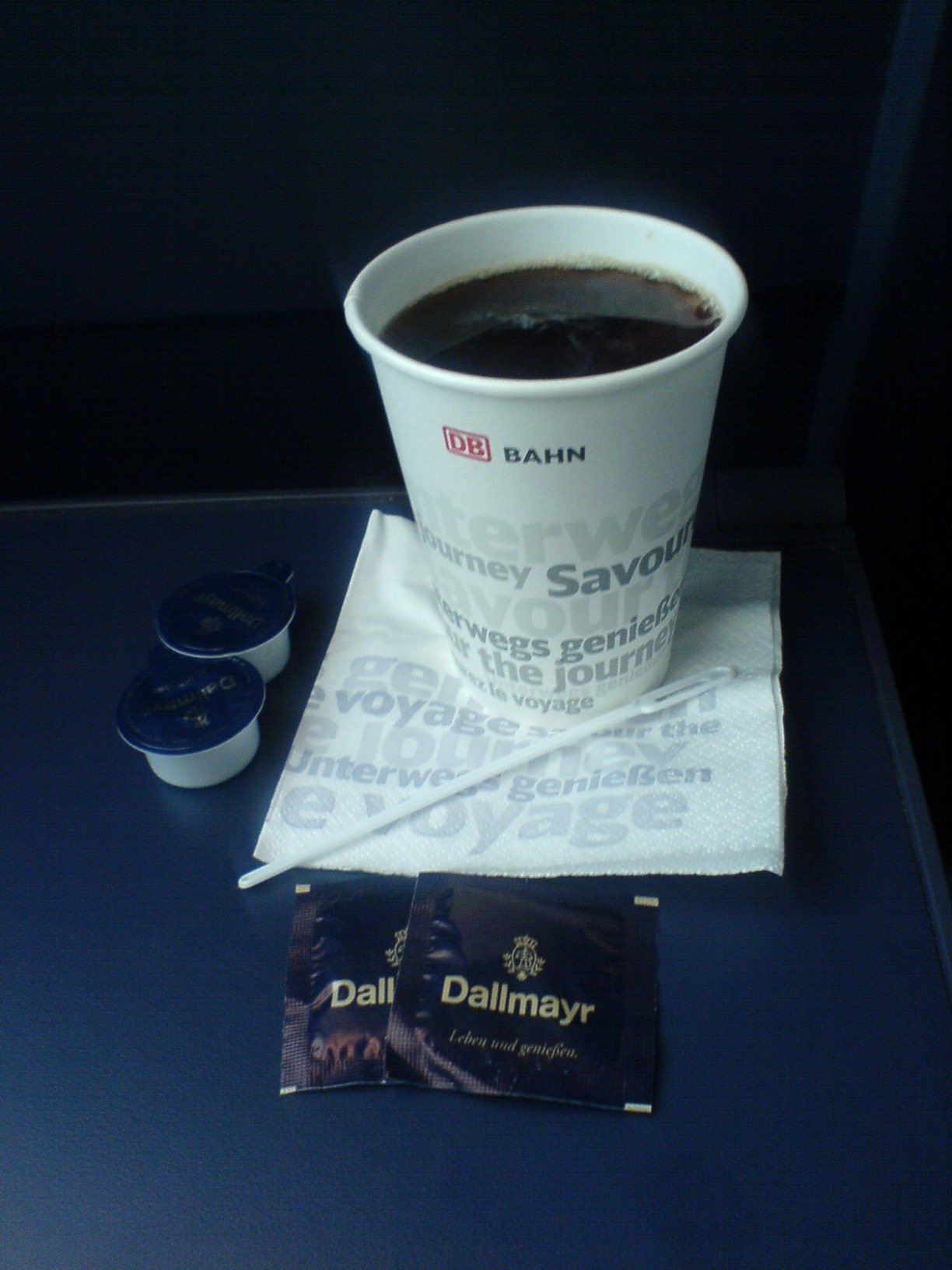
Dallmayr coffee on a Deutsche Bahn ICE

=== Coffee and Tea ===
Dallmayr Kaffee is one of the best-known coffee brands in Germany. The product brands include, for example, Prodomo, Classic, the Italian coffee line Crema d’Oro and Ethiopia. Since 2009, the premium line Grand Cru Café has also existed, each of which contains a pure coffee variety such as Jamaican Blue Mountain or Hawaii Kona. Gastronomers are supplied with the Dallmayr Café & Bar product line. Dallmayr is renowned as a processor of mainly washed arabica raw coffee, which the company sources worldwide. Ethiopia has been the most significant supplier for many years as the place of origin for the Coffea arabica plant. Dallmayr roasts approximately 57,000 tonnes of coffee per year at five locations in Germany. With the acquisition of Heimbs Kaffee (1986), the largest and oldest coffee roaster in Lower Saxony, and Azul Kaffee (1997), it was possible for Dallmayr to expand in this field of sophisticated gastronomy. Both companies are independently operating subsidiary companies of Alois Dallmayr Kaffee oHG.

Dallmayr also offers over 120 different types of tea. Besides the classic black and green teas, numerous flavoured varieties and a selection of rooibos and fruit teas and herbal tea specialities from South Tyrol are available. Dallmayr is also amongst the first merchants in Germany to offer so-called "air freight" tea: The first flush of high-quality Darjeeling tea is internationally air-freighted directly after picking.

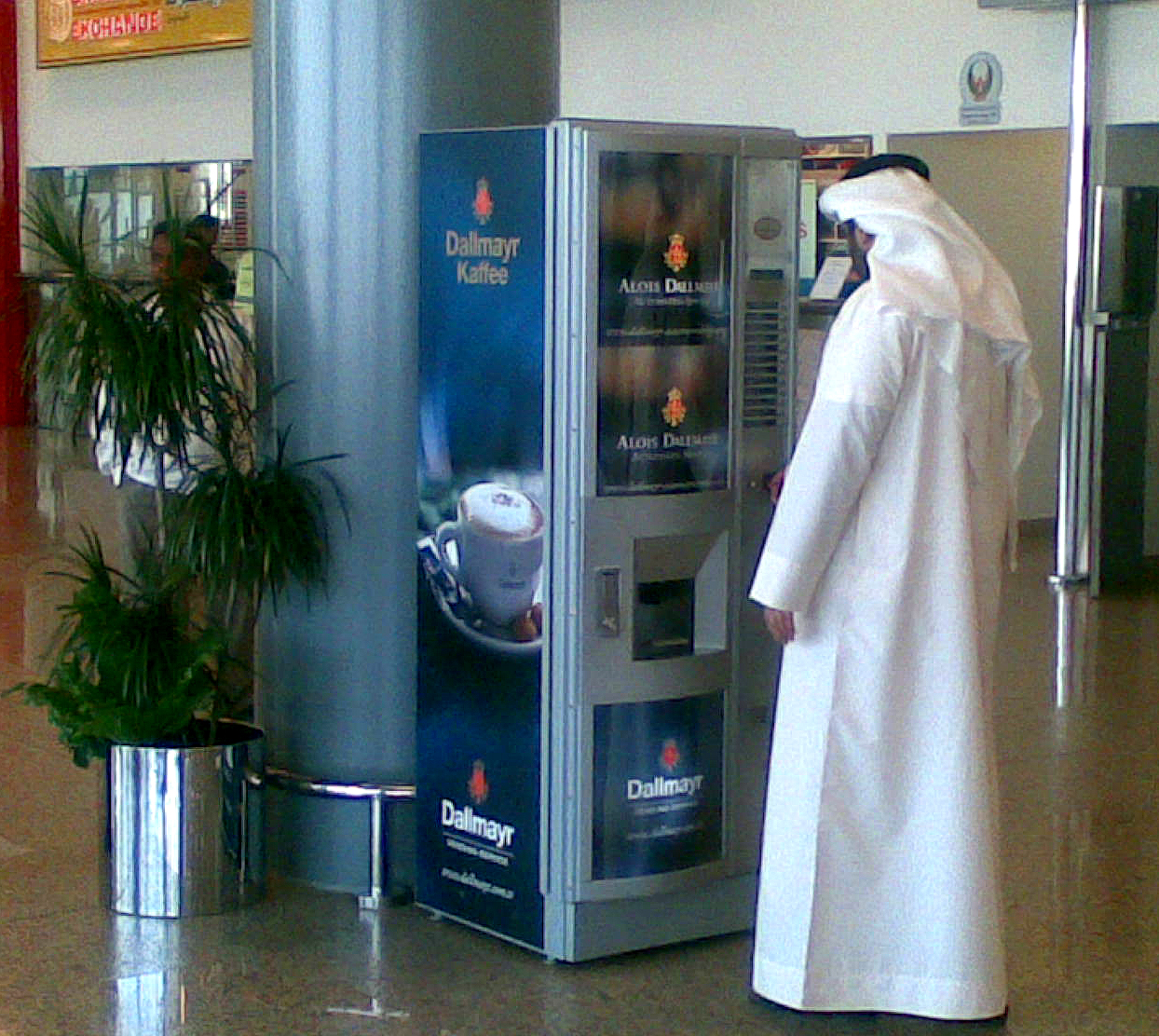
Dallmayr coffee in Dubai

=== Vending & Office ===
Under the business designation "Vending & Office", Dallmayr operates drinks and snack vending machines throughout Germany, across Europe and in the Far East. The first customer was the Munich automobile manufacturer, BMW, who in the 1960s positioned hot drinks vending machines in their production halls: Dallmayr supplied the coffee for these and took over the maintenance of the vending machines. Today, Dallmayr operates over 93,000 vending machines internationally and is therefore, according to their own data, the German market leader, and one of the five largest providers in Europe.

== See also ==
- List of delicatessens
