= Salumeria =

Producer and/or vendor of cured pork (salumi)

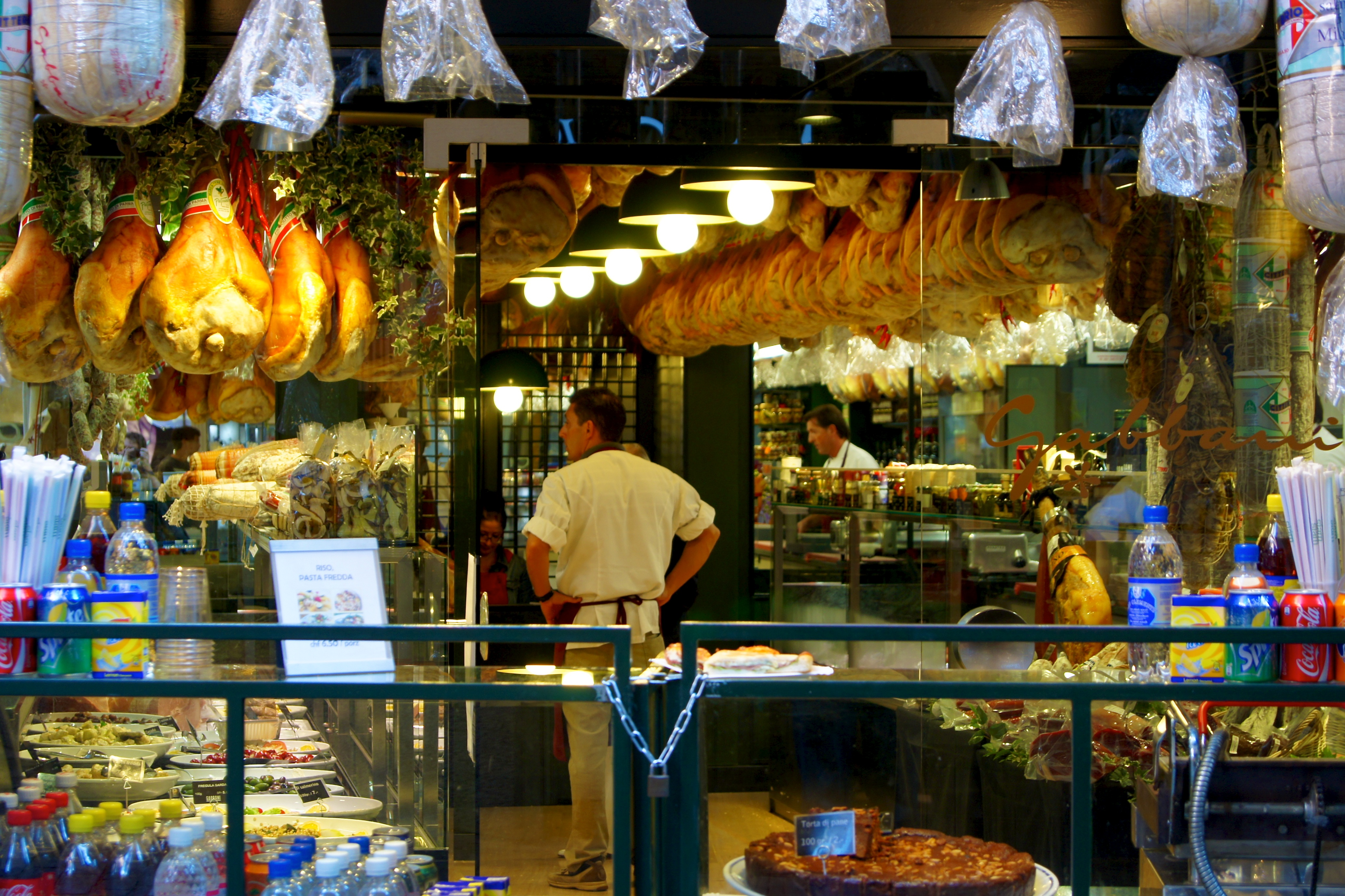
Foods and personnel at a salumeria

A salumeria is a food producer and retail store that produces salumi and other food products. Some only sell foods, while not producing on-site, and some have a restaurant with sit-down service. The salumeria originated in Italy, and dates to the Middle Ages.

== Overview ==
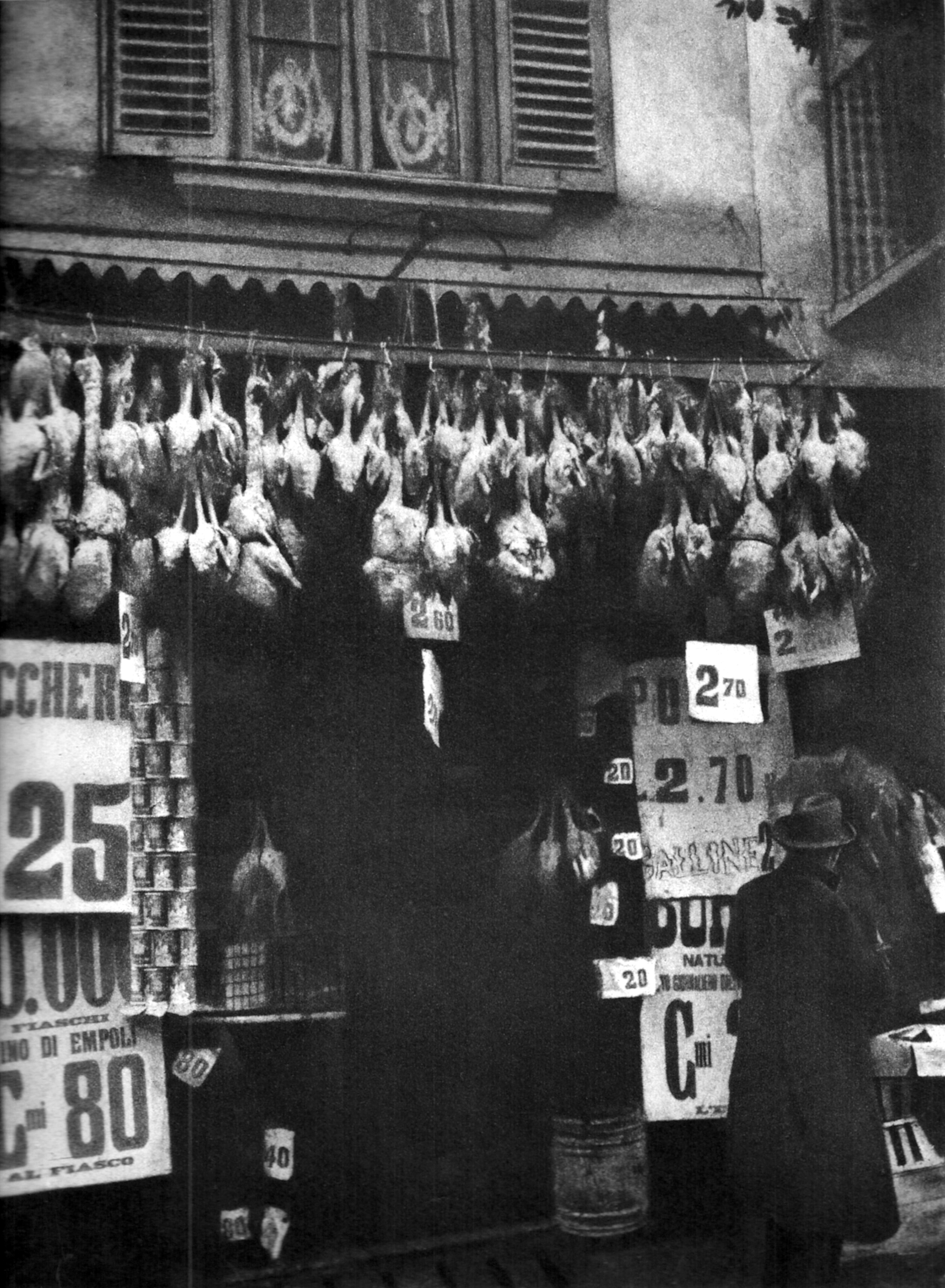
A salumeria in Milan in 1930. Poultry products are hanging in front of the store.

A salumeria is a food purveyor and retail store that produces and sells salumi, which are meat products of Italian origin that includes sausages, cold cuts and other foods predominantly made from pork. Some salumerie also produce some beef-based products, such as bresaola, a salted beef product, and purvey other food products such as pasta, cheese, preserved foods, anchovies, salt cod, wines, bread and cooked meats. Some modern salumerie only sell salumi and related products, while not producing products on-premises. Some salumerie also operate sit-down restaurants, such as Sorriso Italian Salumeria in Queens, New York City. Salumeria Biellese is another salumeria in New York City that is well-known, and was established in 1925.

== History ==
The salumeria originated in Italy and dates to the Middle Ages. Historically, salumerie in Bologna, Italy, did not produce their own meats. They selected meats and other products such as pasta, olives and cheeses from local purveyors. These purveyors worked in a guild system that was created by the signori in Bologna, the city's rulers, in a system that dates to the Middle Ages. Purveyors for salumeria products included the salaroli, which controlled the salt industry, who salted the pork, which was then shipped to the lardaioli, a guild that sold the pork. The lardaioli also produced soap and candles from the pork lard they would receive. This guild system was eliminated by Napoléon Bonaparte around the time of the turn of the 19th century.

== Gallery ==
Salumerie

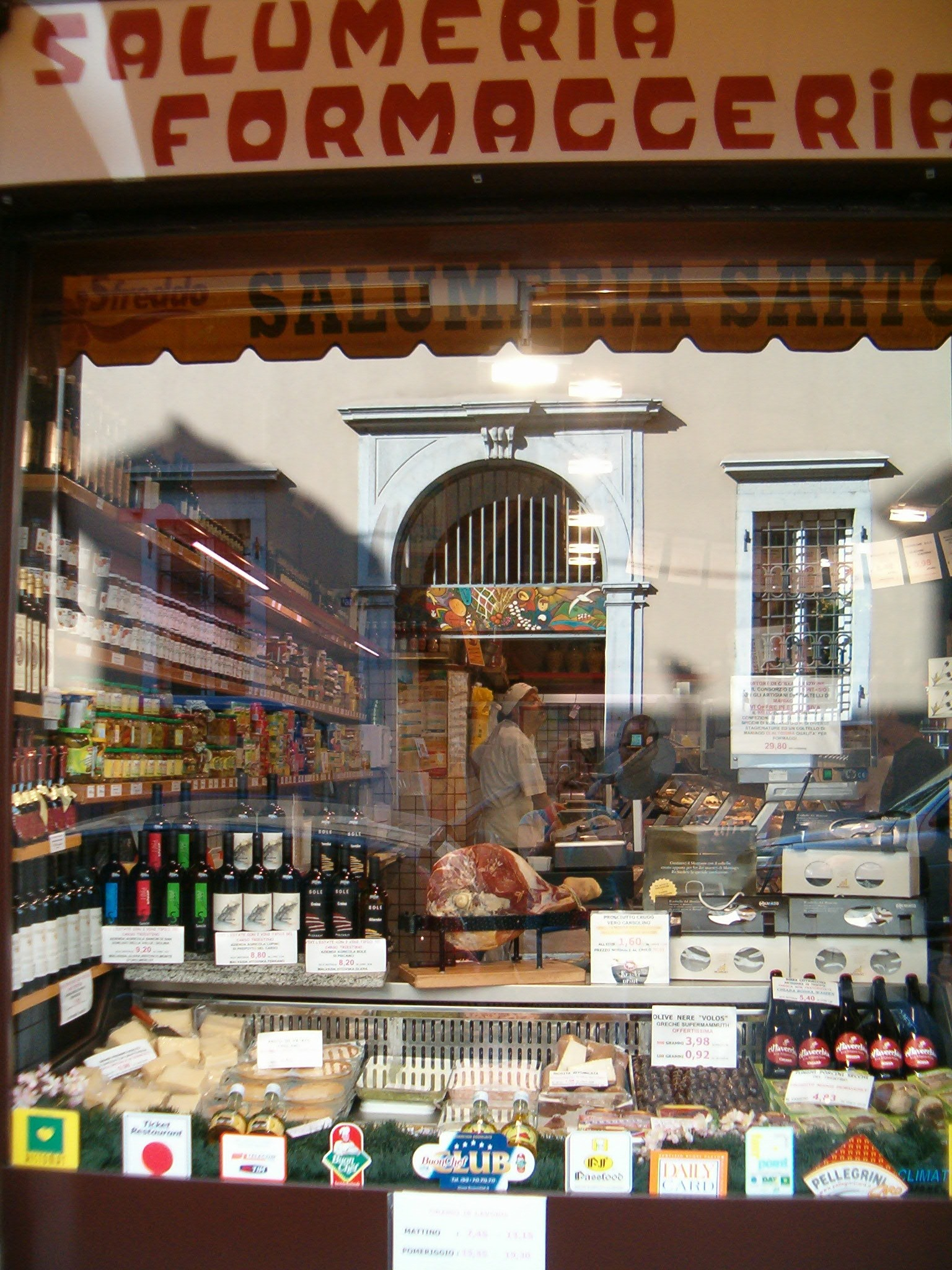
Foods at a salumeria

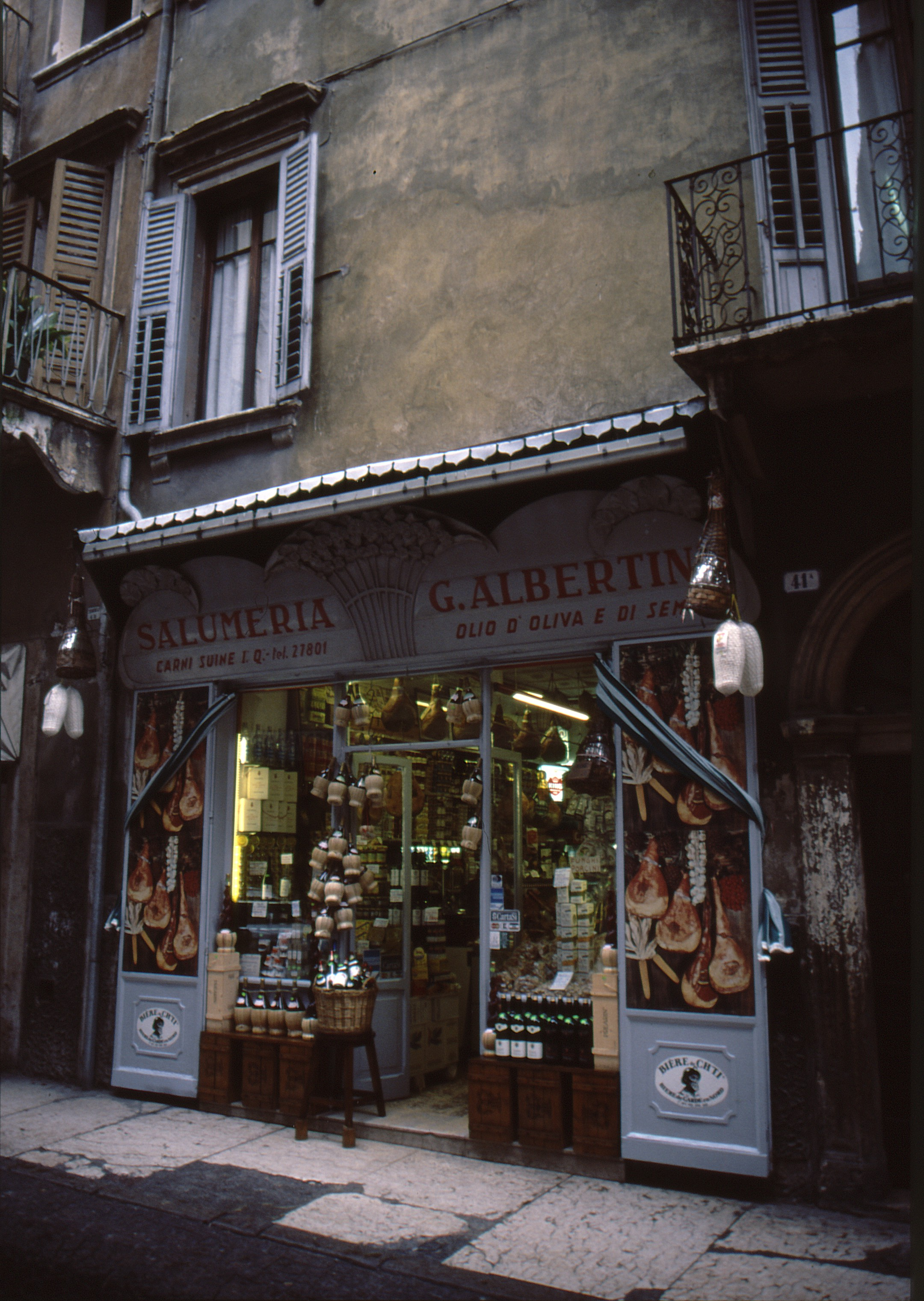
The store front of a salumeria in Verona, Italy

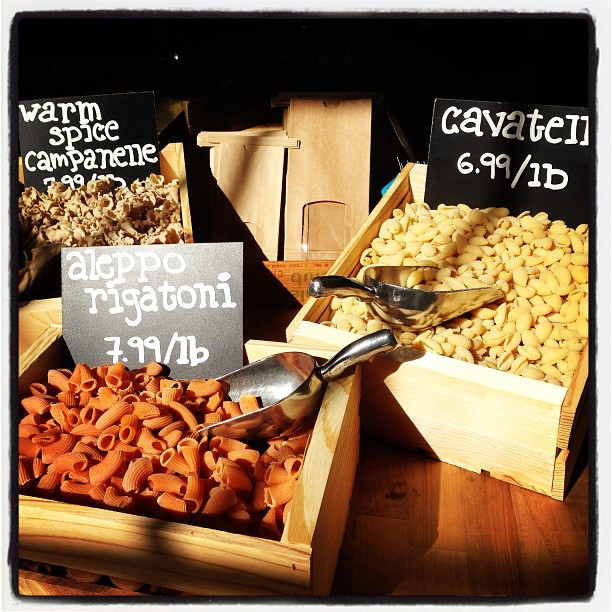
Pasta at a salumeria

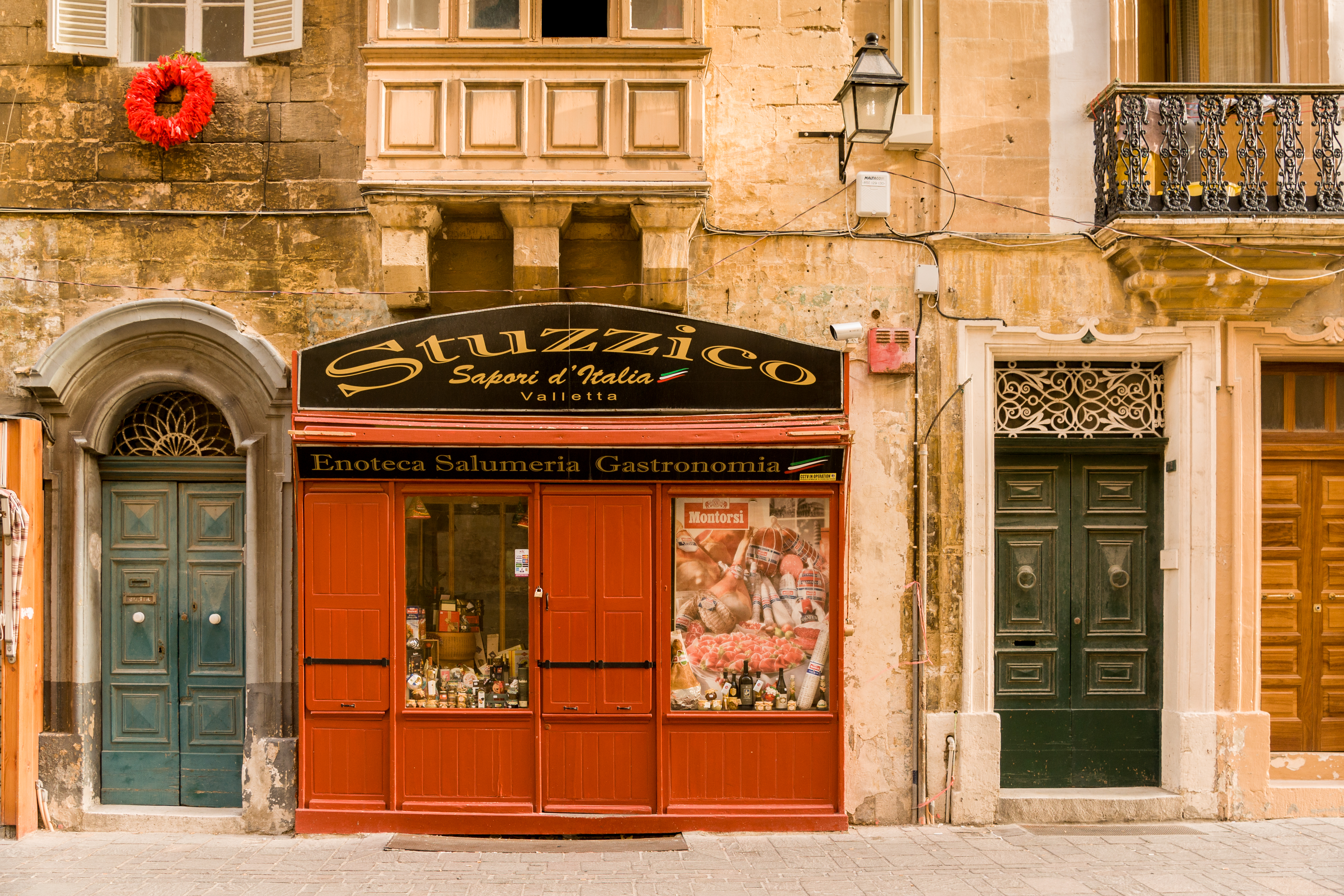
A salumeria in Valletta, Malta

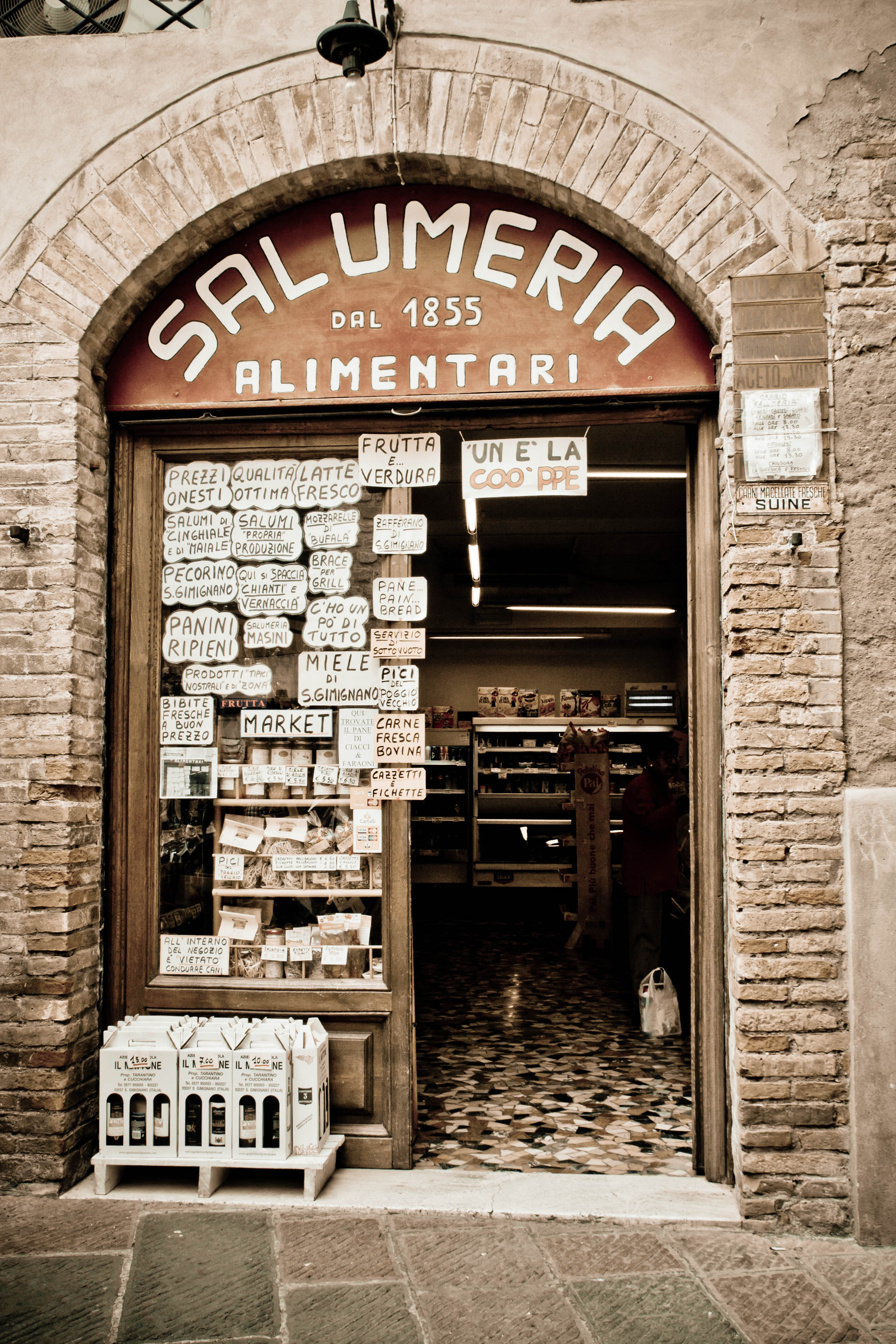
A salumeria in San Gimignano, Italy, established in 1855

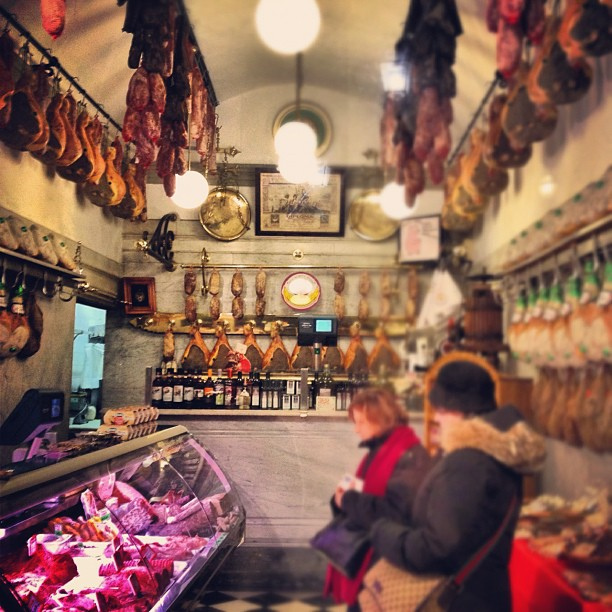
Interior of a salumeria

== See also ==
- Trattoria
