= Trattoria =

Type of Italian eatery

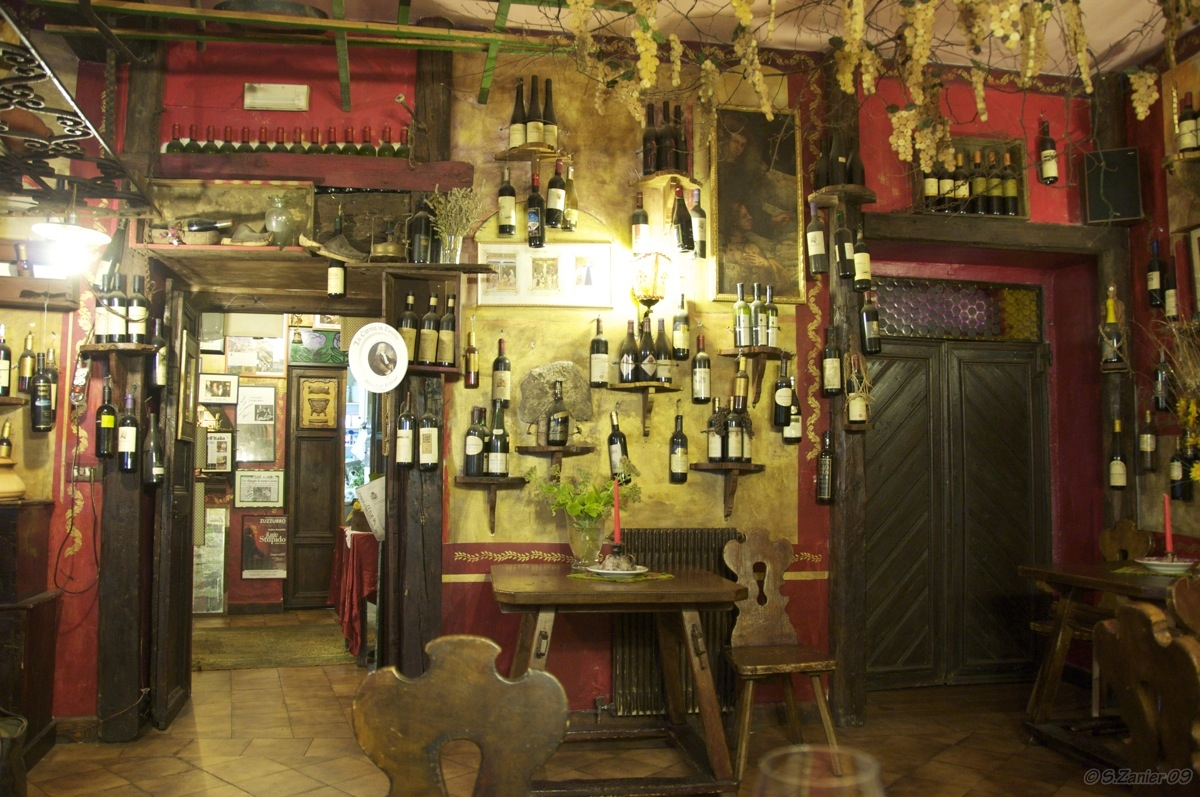
A characteristic trattoria in Tolmezzo, Friuli-Venezia Giulia, Italy

A trattoria is an Italian eatery, generally less formal than a ristorante (lit. 'restaurant') but more formal than an osteria.

== Background ==
A trattoria rooted in tradition, typically, is without a printed menu, with casual service, wine sold by the decanter rather than the bottle, low prices, and a menu of modest but plentiful offerings that follow regional and local recipes rather than haute cuisine. Sometimes, food is served family-style, at common tables. Optionally, a trattoria may offer takeaway. This tradition has waned in recent decades. Many trattorie have taken on some of the trappings of a ristorante, providing relatively few concessions to the old rustic and familial style. The name trattoria has also been adopted by some high-level restaurants.

== Etymology ==
The word trattoria is cognate with the French term traiteur (a caterer providing takeaway food). Derived in Italian from trarre, meaning 'to treat' (from the Latin tractare/trahere, 'to draw'), its etymology has also been linked to the Latin term littera tractoria, which referred to a letter ordering provision of food and drink for officials traveling on the business of the Holy Roman Empire.

== See also ==
- Bistro
- Cabaret
- Tavern
