= Save the Deli =

2009 book by David Sax

- Author: David Sax
- Language: English
- Genre: Non-fiction
- Publisher: Houghton Mifflin Harcourt
- Publication date: October 19, 2009
- Publication place: United States
- Media type: Print (hardcover)
- ISBN: 978-0151013845

Save the Deli: In Search of Perfect Pastrami, Crusty Rye, and the Heart of Jewish Delicatessen is a book published by Canadian journalist David Sax about the decline of the Jewish delicatessen.

The book is about the history of Jewish delicatessens around the world, particularly in cities like New York City, Los Angeles, Montreal, Paris and London. It is based on Sax's three year travels to dine at various delicatessens and compare the local food culture.

== Reception ==
The book had mostly positive reviews at the time of its release.
