= Cheese Shop =

Cheese Shop can refer to:

- a shop that sells cheese
  - The Cheese Shop, Louth, in Lincolnshire, England
  - The Cheese Store of Beverly Hills, in California, U.S.
- Cheese Shop sketch, from Monty Python's Flying Circus, 1972
- The Cheese Shop, a former British comedy writing and performing team
- Python Package Index, known as the Cheese Shop, a software repository
