= List of delicatessens =

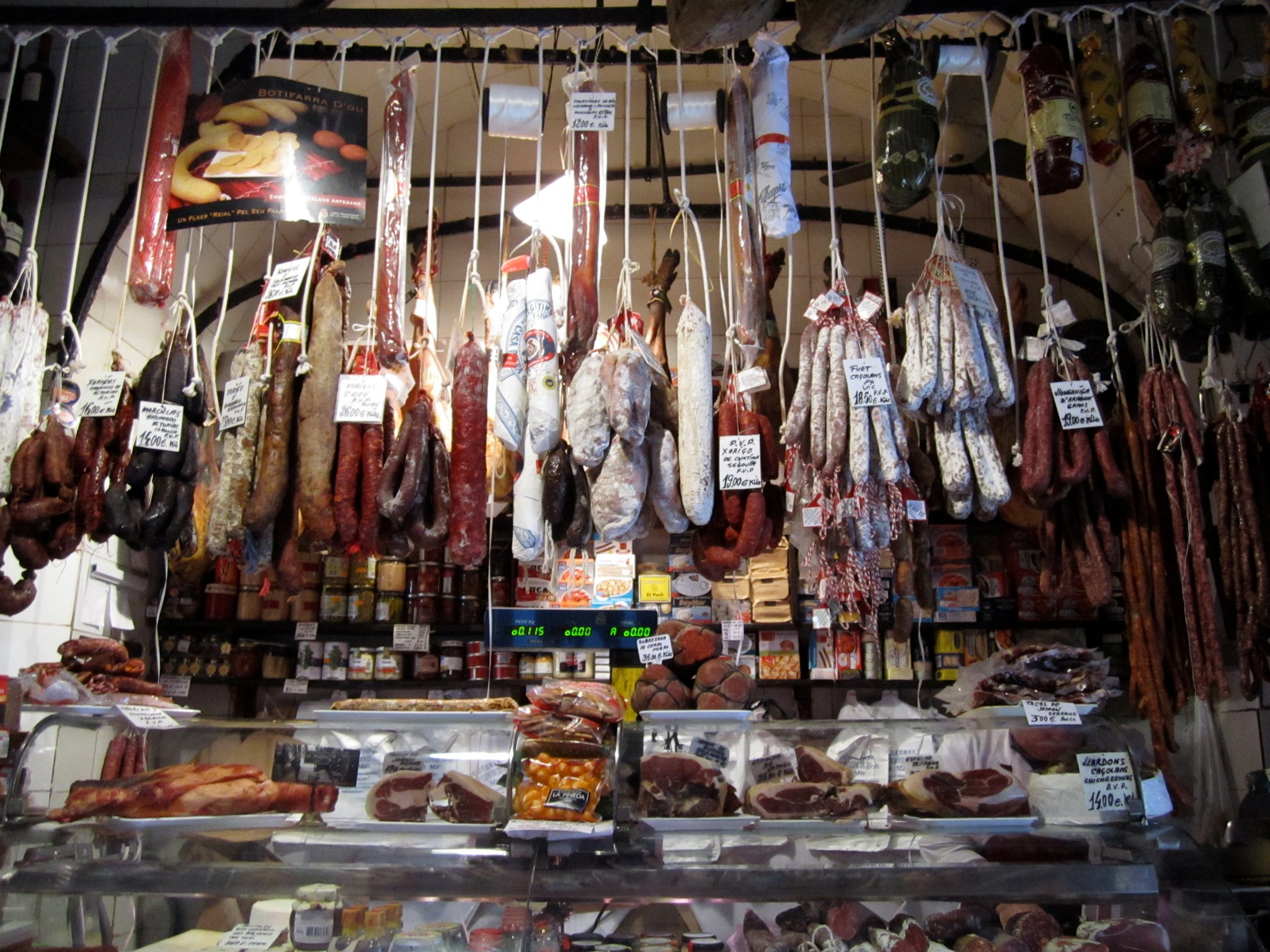
Foods at a delicatessen

This is a list of notable delicatessens. A delicatessen is a retail establishment that sells a selection of unusual or foreign prepared foods. Delicatessens originated in Germany during the 1700s. They later spread to the United Kingdom then the United States in the late 1800s during the diaspora of European immigrants. Because of their cultural ties to Central and Eastern European culture, the Ashkenazi Jews popularized the delicatessen within American culture beginning in 1888.

== Delicatessens ==
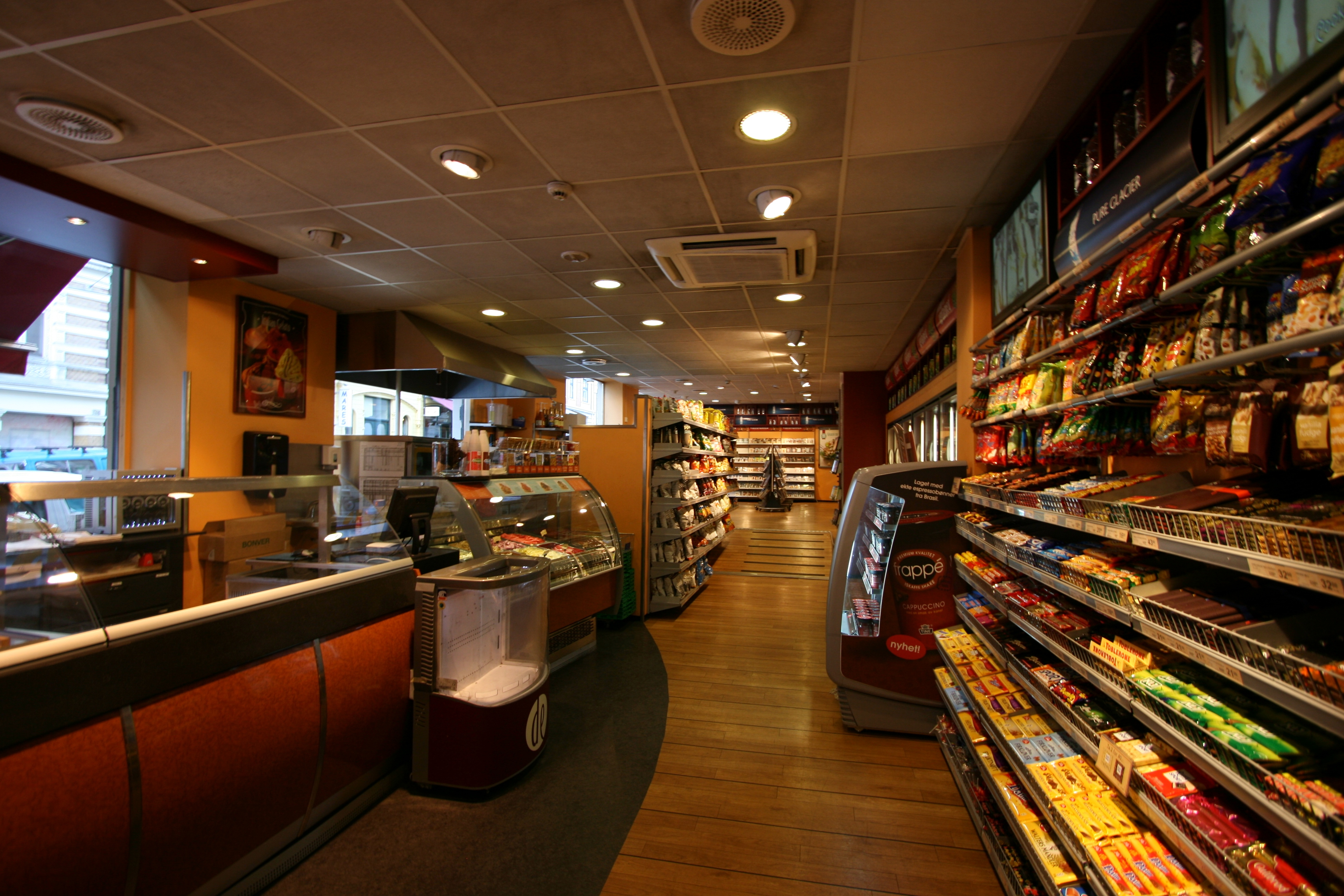
The interior of a Deli de Luca store

=== Europe ===
- Dallmayr – Munich, Germany
- Deli de Luca – Norwegian convenience store and delicatessen chain
- Delicatessen stores in Poland

=== England ===
The front of Scandinavian Kitchen in London

- The Cheese Shop, Louth – Louth, Lincolnshire, England
- Fortnum & Mason – Piccadilly, London
- Gaby's Deli – Charing Cross Road (closed)
- ScandiKitchen – London

=== United States ===
- Bavarian Meats – Seattle
- Ben's Kosher Deli
- Brent's Deli – Northridge, California
- Chick's Deli – New Jersey
- Call Your Mother, Washington, D.C., and Denver
- Canter's – Los Angeles, California
- DeLaurenti Food & Wine – Seattle
- Devil's Dill Sandwich Shop
- Dixie Chili and Deli – Kentucky
- Edelweiss Sausage & Delicatessen – Portland, Oregon
- Fossati's Delicatessen – Texas
- Groucho's Deli - South Carolina
- Jason's Deli – has locations in 29 U.S. states
- Junior's - New York City
- Katz's Deli - Manhattan, New York
- Liebman's Deli - Riverdale, Bronx, New York
- McAlister's Deli – locations in 24 U.S. states
- Michou Deli – Pike Place Market, Seattle
- Molinari's – San Francisco
- Nate 'n Al – Beverly Hills, California
- P's & Q's Market – Portland, Oregon
- Pasture PDX – Portland, Oregon
- Rein's Deli – Vernon, Connecticut
- Sarge's Deli
- Sebastiano's – Portland, Oregon
- Second Avenue Deli - Manhattan, New York
- Zingerman's – Ann Arbor MI

== Jewish delicatessens ==
A Jewish deli, also known as a Jewish delicatessen, is a delicatessen establishment that serves various traditional dishes in Ashkenazi Jewish cuisine, and are typically known for their sandwiches such as pastrami on rye, as well as their soups such as matzo ball soup, among other dishes.

== By type ==
- Expatriate delicatessen

== See also ==
- List of submarine sandwich restaurants
- Lists of restaurants
- Specialty foods
