= DeLaurenti Food & Wine =

Grocery store and deli in Seattle, Washington, U.S.

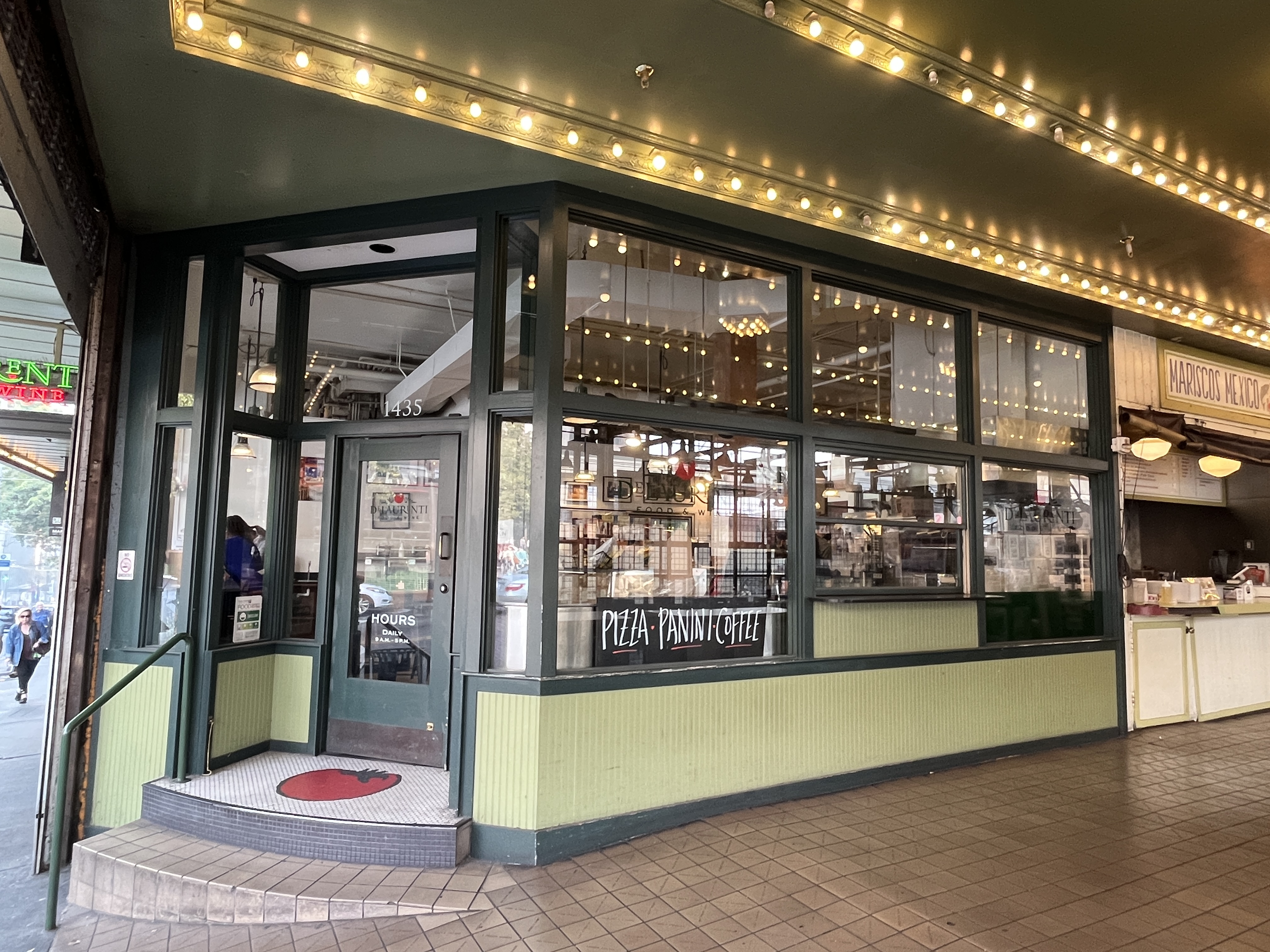
- The store's exterior in 2022
- Interactive map of DeLaurenti Food & Wine

Restaurant information
- Established: 1946
- Food type: Italian
- Location: Seattle, Washington, United States
- Coordinates: 47.6086°N 122.3401°W
- Website: delaurenti.com

DeLaurenti Food & Wine is an Italian specialty grocery store and delicatessen at Seattle's Pike Place Market, in the U.S. state of Washington.

== Description ==
DeLaurenti Food & Wine is an Italian grocery store and delicatessen at Pike Place Market. The business stocks various products such as antipasto, breads, cheeses, canned fish, olives and olive oil, dried pastas, prosciutto, salami, and tomato sauce. The deli serves pizza, Italian sandwiches, and meatballs in marinara sauce. The Parma sandwich has prosciutto, arugula, white truffle oil, and shaved Parmesan on an Italian sandwich roll.

== History ==
DeLaurenti was established in 1946.

== Reception ==
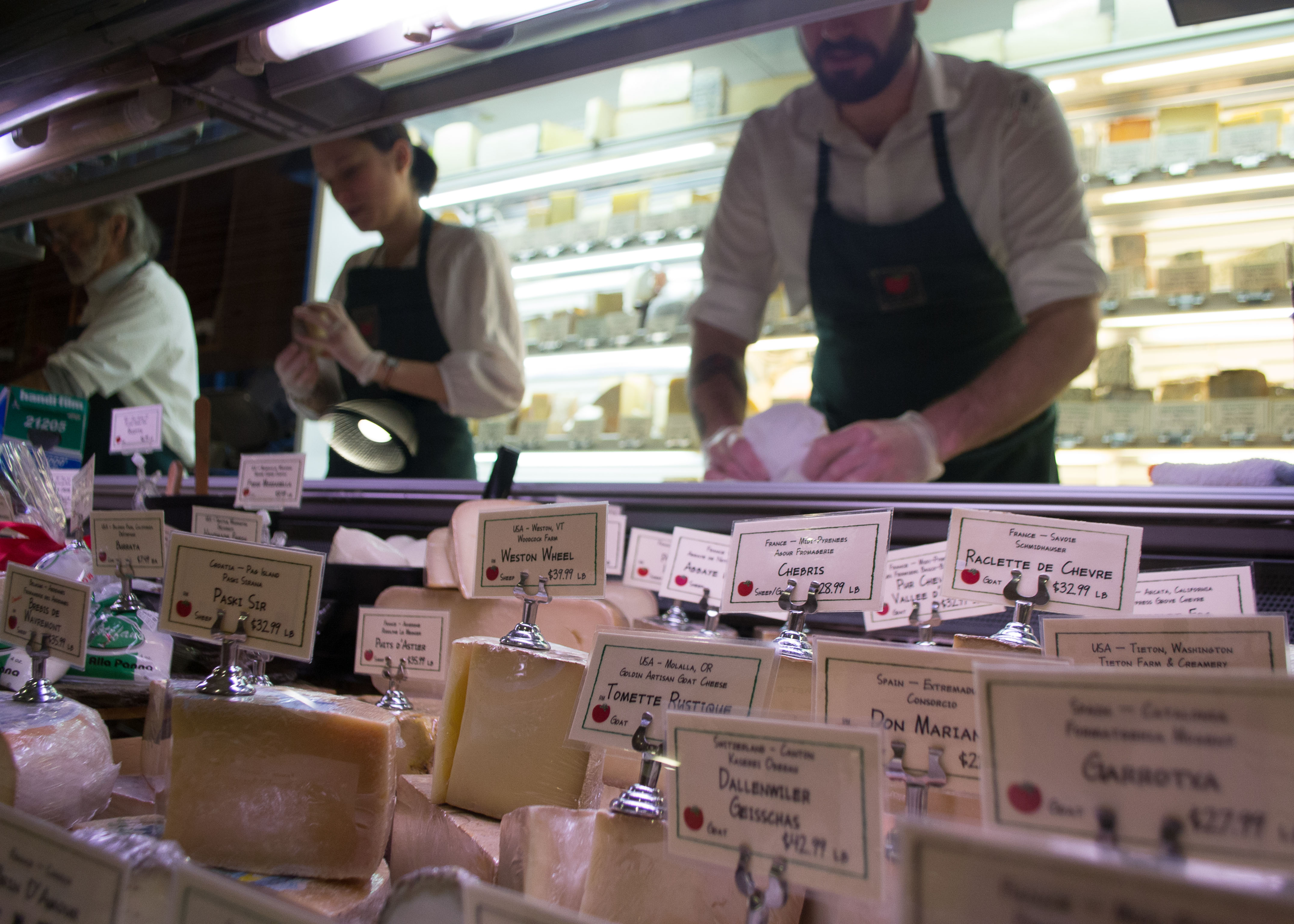
Cheese selection

Lonely Planet has described the business as "a great place for any aficionado of Italian foods to browse and sample". Dylan Joffe included DeLaurenti in Thrillist's 2016 list of "The Secret Hidden Gems of Pike Place Market". The business was included in Seattle Weekly's 2016 list of "Top 12 Spots for Cheese Addicts in Seattle". In 2021, Aimee Rizzo of Seattle Magazine called DeLaurenti one of the city's "best-kept secrets" with "an extremely diverse" wine selection.

Lesley Balla included the grocery store in Eater Seattle's 2019 overview of "The Greatest Places to Eat in Seattle's Greatest Tourist Trap". The website's Jade Yamazaki Stewart included DeLaurenti in a 2022 list of "20 Great Restaurants Near Pike Place Market". Zoe Sayler included the shop in Seattle Metropolitan's 2022 list of "Where to Find Last-Minute Gifts in Your Neighborhood".

== See also ==
- List of delicatessens
- List of Italian restaurants
