= Fossati's Delicatessen =

- Fossati's
- U.S. National Register of Historic Places
- Recorded Texas Historic Landmark
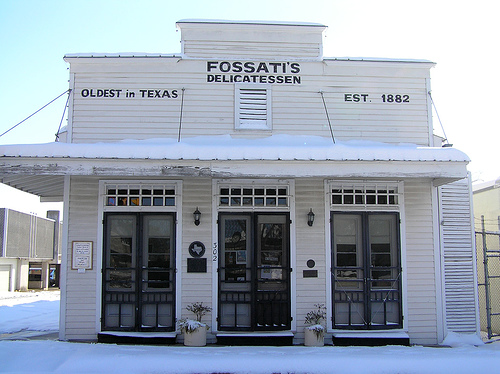
- Fossati's Delicatessen

- Location within Texas Location within the United States
- Location: 302 S. Main, Victoria, Texas
- Coordinates: 28°47′49″N 97°0′22″W
- Area: less than one acre
- Built: 1900
- Architectural style: Vernacular commercial
- MPS: Victoria MRA
- NRHP reference No.: 91000578
- RTHL No.: 6547

Significant dates
- Added to NRHP: May 20, 1991
- Designated RTHL: 1987

Fossati's Delicatessen is the oldest deli in Texas and one of the oldest restaurants in the United States. Located in Victoria, Texas, Fossati's was opened in 1882 by Italian immigrant Fraschio ("Frank") Napoleon Fossati. Fossati's was added to the National Register of Historic Places on May 20, 1991. After over 140 years, Fossati's is still owned and operated by the same family.

Fossati had the current building constructed in 1895 and moved the deli from a nearby downtown location (actually, Fossati's had changed locations several times, and had, at one time or another, been on every corner of the square in downtown Victoria). The current building features double front doors with multi-light transoms.

Over the years, Fossati's has handled imported foods, groceries, and feed and has served as an important gathering place for Victoria's citizens. In addition, many famous musicians have played at the deli, including country music legend Willie Nelson. The deli is often used for political functions as well. Most recently, Texas Governor Rick Perry held a campaign stop in Victoria on August 25, 2010.

In the back room of the deli, known as the Frank Napoleon room, there is a giant bookcase filled with hundreds of cookbooks, many of which have been out of print for 50+ years. Also inside, there is a trench-like area just above the floor surrounding the bar. This is where men used to spit tobacco. Outside of the building there are still metal rings where men used to tie up their horses and come in for a drink.

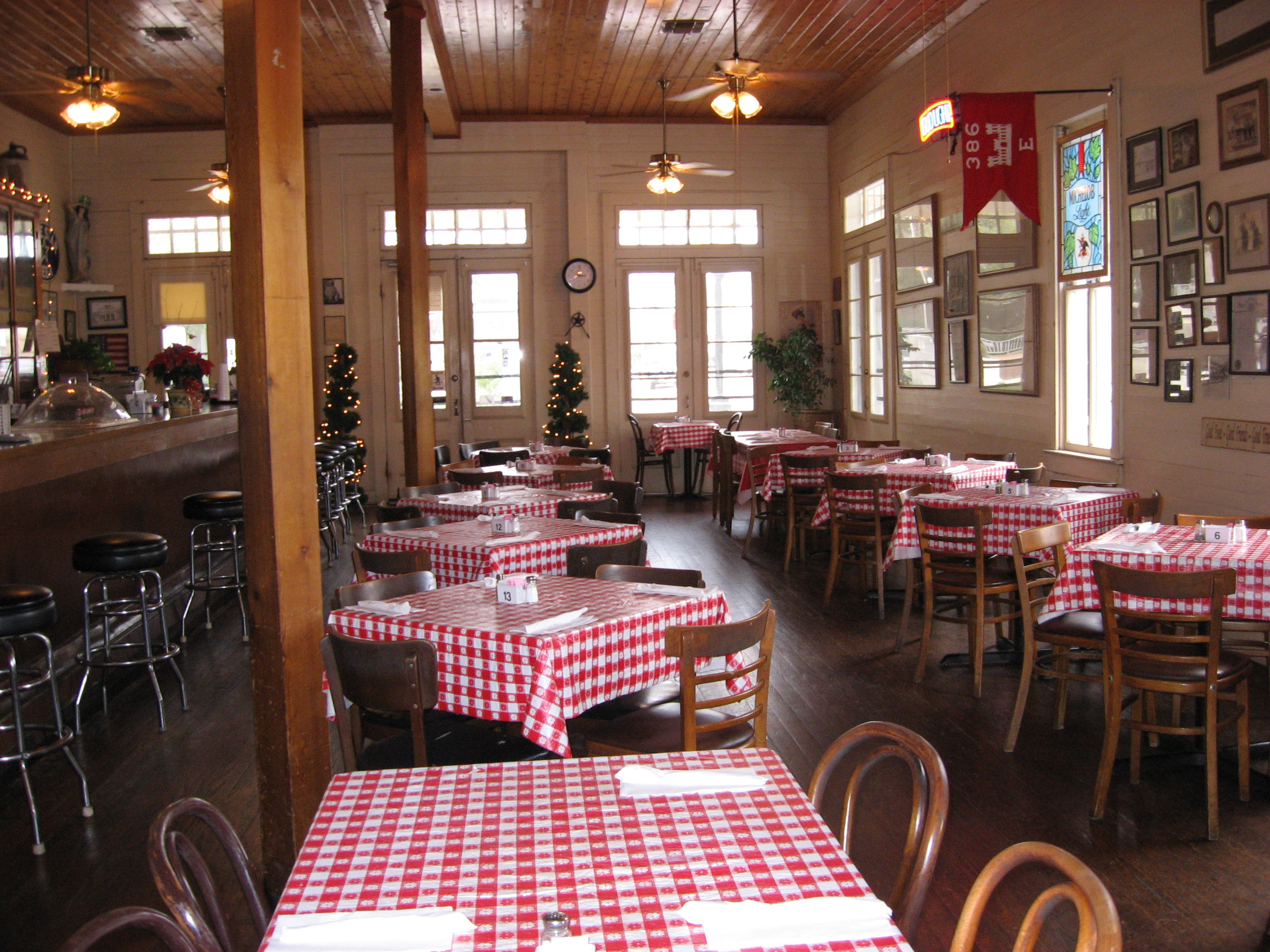
Fossati's Interior.

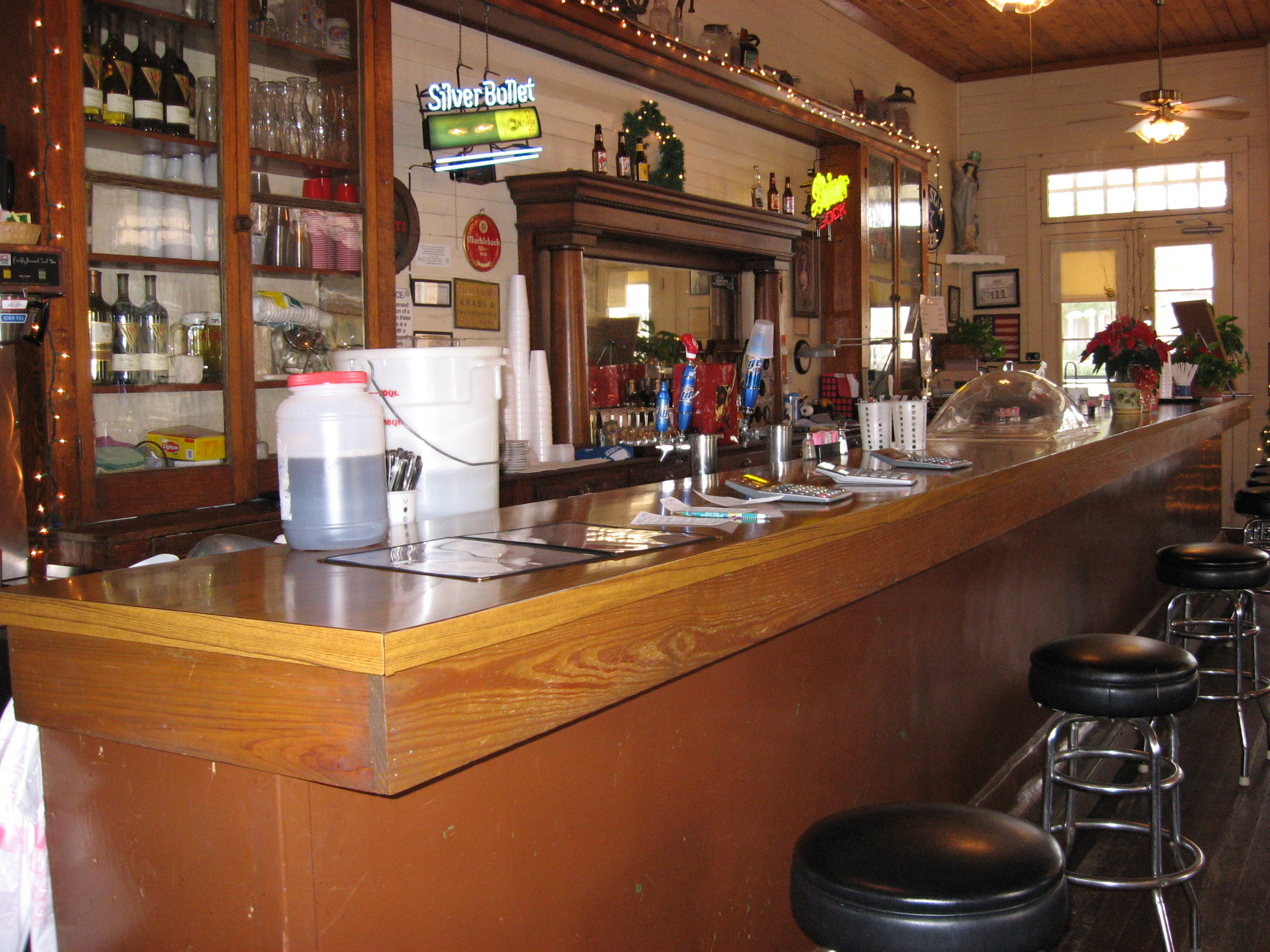
The historic bar at Fossati's.

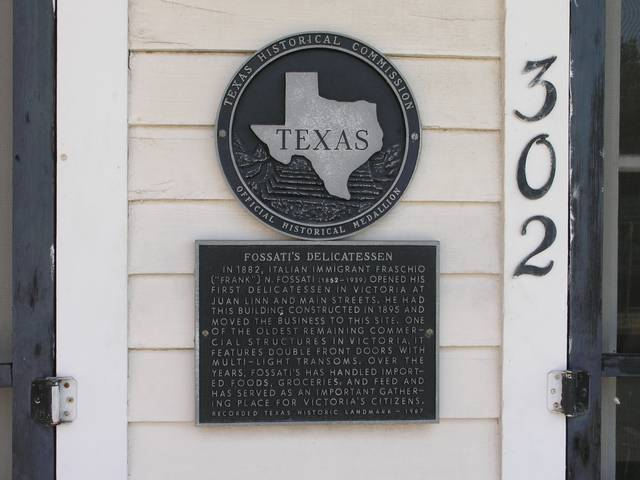
Fossati's Historical Marker.

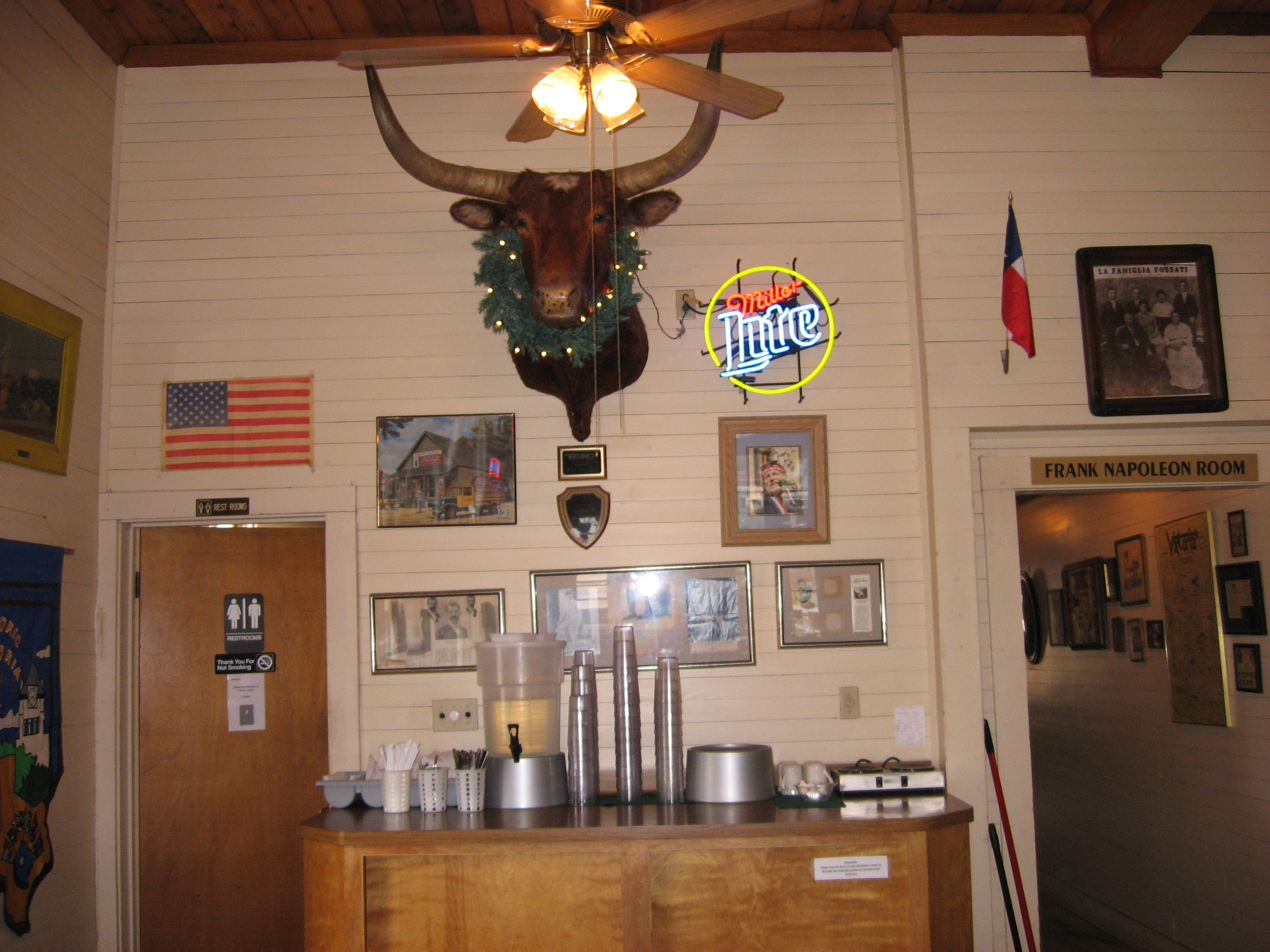
Interior of Fossati's Deli.

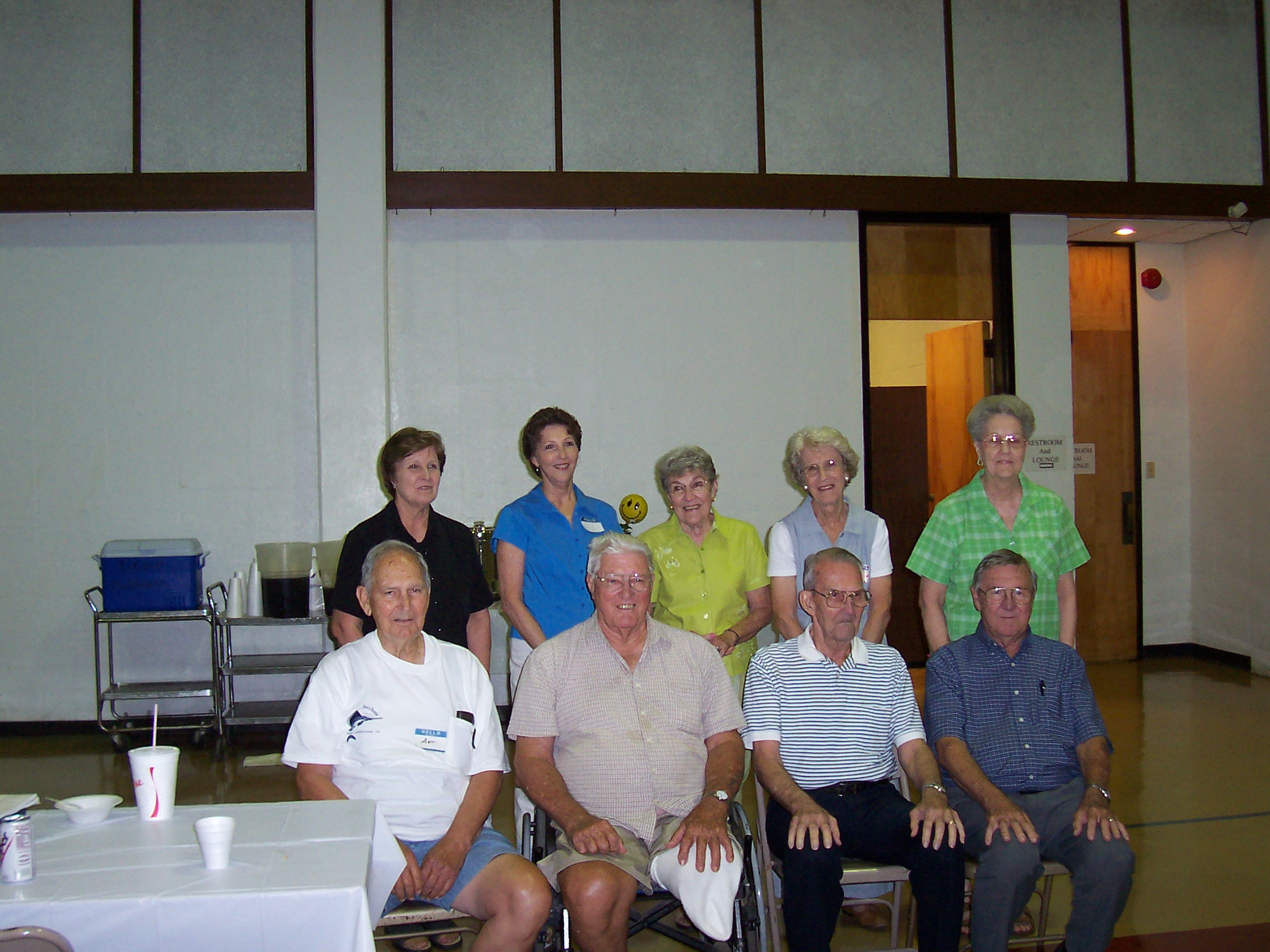
Some of the grandchildren of Fossati's founder Frank Napoleon Fossati (many of whom currently run the deli), and their spouses.

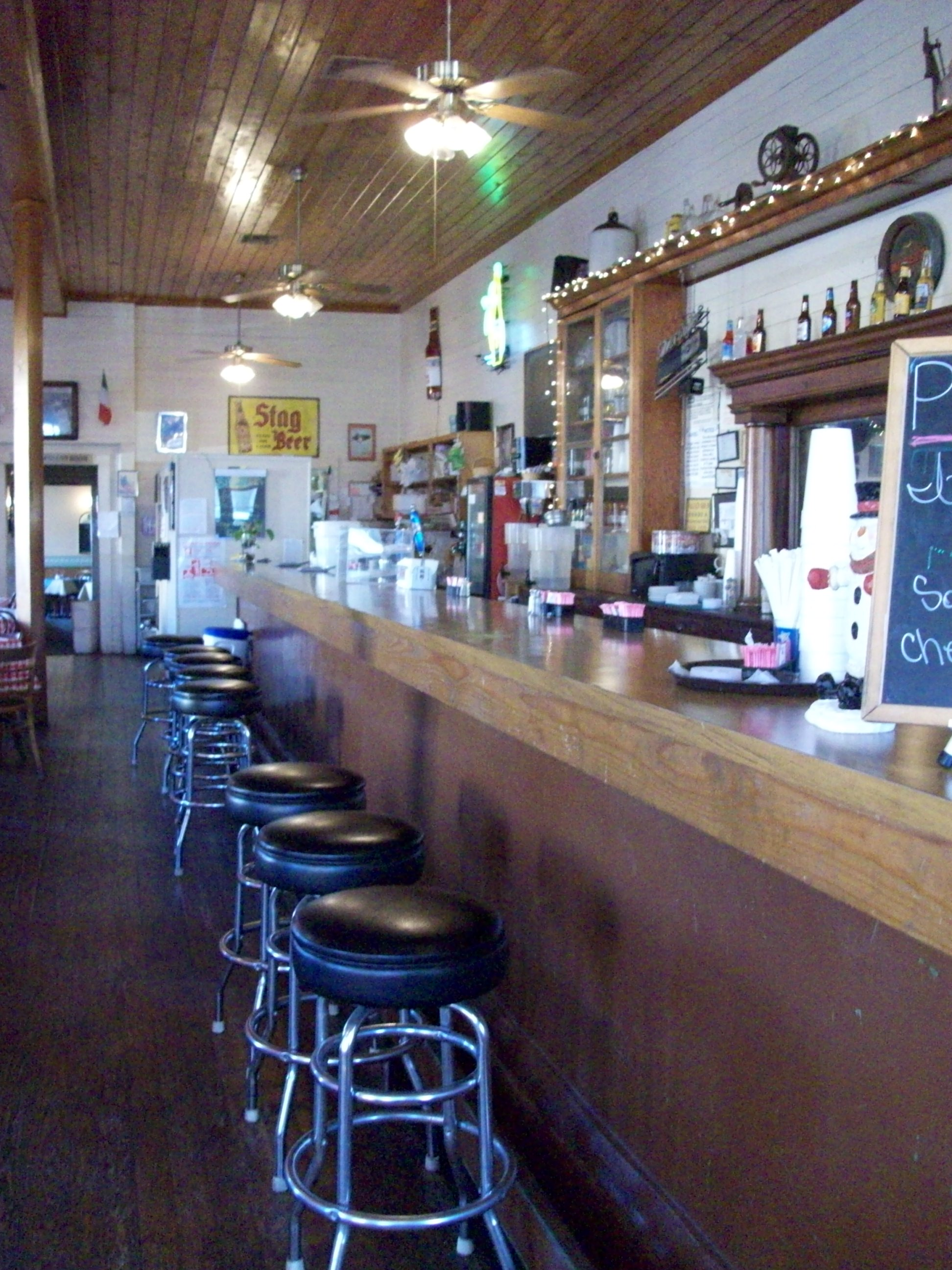
Bar at Fossati's Deli.

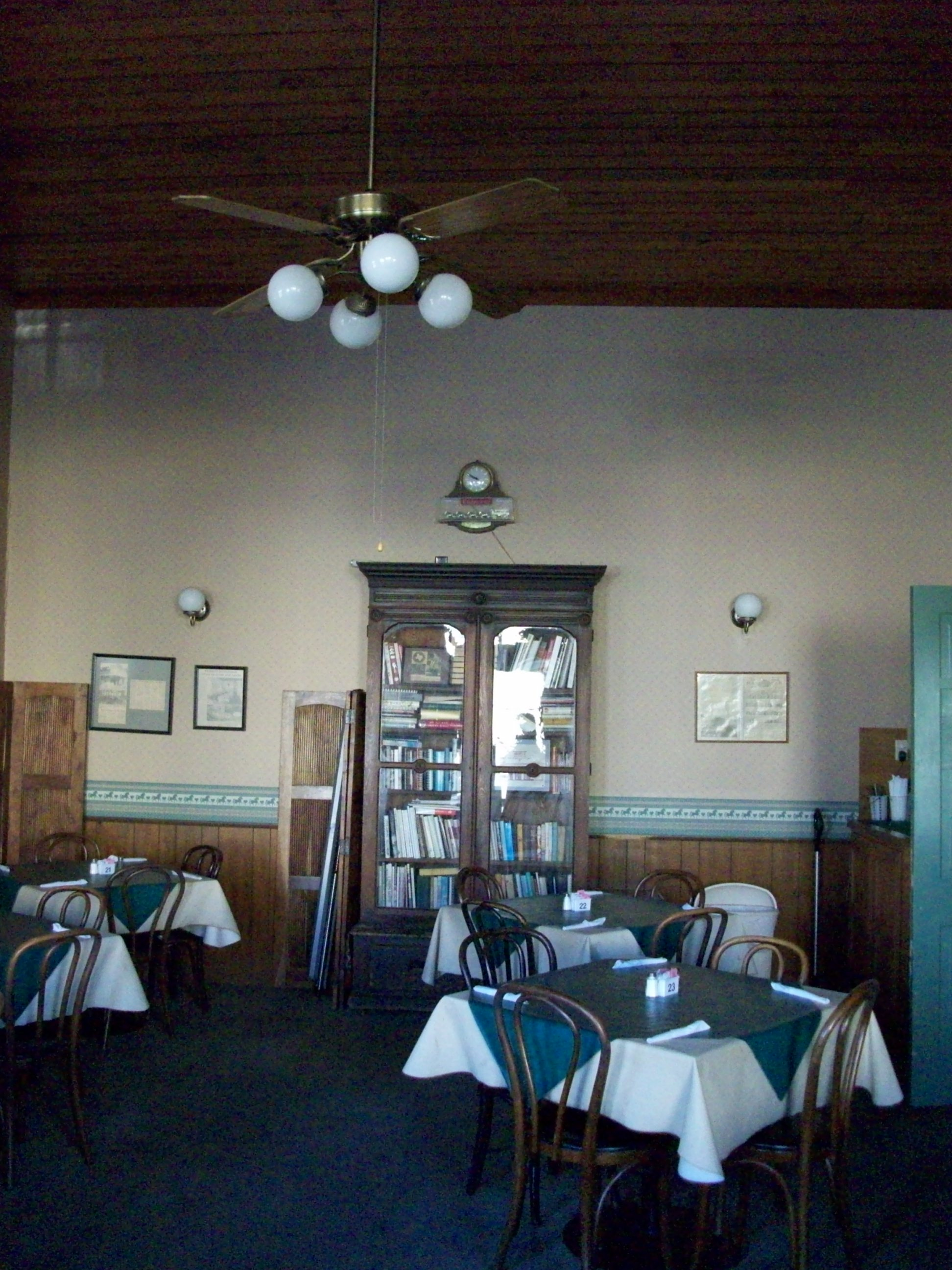
Cookbooks at Fossati's Deli.

== See also ==
- List of delicatessens
- National Register of Historic Places listings in Victoria County, Texas
- Recorded Texas Historic Landmarks in Victoria County
- Media related to Fossati's Delicatessen at Wikimedia Commons
