= Deli de Luca =

Norwegian convenience store

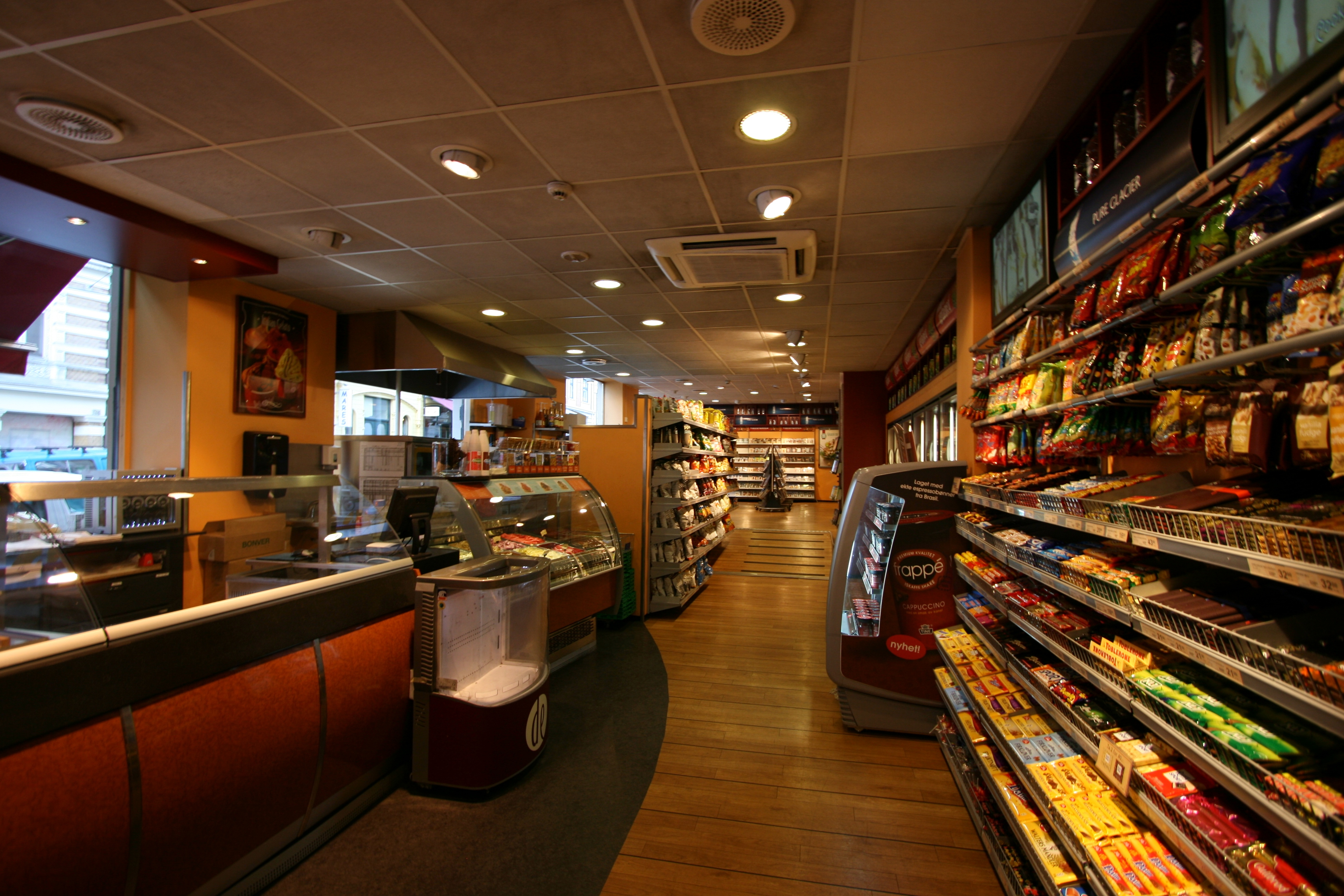
The interior of a Deli de Luca store

Deli de Luca is a Norwegian convenience store and delicatessen chain founded in 2003 by Adriano Capoferro and four other founding partners (Thor Johansen, Geir Syversen, Terje Bergh and Vesna Milkovic). There are 22 stores in Oslo, four in Bergen, one in Stavanger, two in Trondheim, two in Kristiansand, one in Skien and two in Mo i Rana. Most of the stores are open 24/7. In 2006, 62% of the company was bought by NorgesGruppen.

The five founding partners had been colleagues at the convenience store chain 7-Eleven, whose Norwegian franchise is operated by the Norwegian retail giant Reitan-Gruppen. The Deli de Luca founders had been frustrated by what they perceived as a rigid and uncreative environment within Reitan's 7-Eleven business. With the financial support of several silent partners, the five broke out on their own to create a cross between a convenience store and a delicatessen.

According to Capoferro, the sale of Deli de Luca was driven by its financial backers' wish to cash out at a pre-set exit date. The purchase of Deli de Luca by NorgesGruppen included a total cashout by the financial partners and a partial cashout by the five operating partners.

== See also ==
- List of delicatessens
