= Expatriate delicatessen =

An expatriate delicatessen, expat foodstore or expat supermarket is a delicatessen (European meaning) that specialise in selling food and drink of particular country to expatriates and food enthusiasts who can't find such items in local food shops. These are usually set-up in areas of high expatriate areas to gain maximum sales or on-line. Unlike an ethnic grocer which tends to sell a mixture of products and goods, an expatiate delicatessen tends to sell items from one particular place such as Portugal or region like Eastern Europe. As they are specialised food stores, they charge high prices (usually several times their value) due to a lack of competition, high local duties and low orders from their suppliers. They also sometimes sell items in relation to the area like cooking equipment or native-language media that are hard to find in regular shops.

== Items ==
Examples of the items that are sold in these stores such as in an American expatriate delicatessen are Lucky Charms breakfast cereal, 3 Musketeers, Hershey's chocolate and Reese's Peanut Butter Cups confectionery, Fluff marshmallow spread, A1 steak sauce and Mountain Dew fizzy drink, while a Polish store sells jarred bigos, sauerkraut, gherkins, smetana and kielbasa wiejska sausage. Such items are usually either directly imported from the country or ordered through grey market importers. Some items are impossible to import as the local country bans them or controls their imports. For example, American Mountain Dew is banned in the UK as it contains an ingredient (BVO) which is not allowed in the local food chain so a different version is made for the UK.

== See also ==
- List of delicatessens
- Specialty food
