= P's & Q's Market =

Convenience store and delicatessen in Portland, Oregon, U.S.

- Interactive map of P's & Q's Market

Restaurant information
- Established: 2013
- Location: 1301 Northeast Dekum Street, Portland, Multnomah, Oregon, United States
- Coordinates: 45°34′19″N 122°39′06″W

P's & Q's Market is a grocer and restaurant in Portland, Oregon, United States. It opened in 2013 and Guy Fieri visited for an episode of the Food Network series Diners, Drive-Ins and Dives.

== Description ==
The convenience store and delicatessen P's & Q's Market operates on Dekum Street near Woodlawn Park in northeast Portland's Woodlawn neighborhood. The market offers sandwiches, macaroni salad and other sides and snacks like banana pudding, canned fish, cheese, and coleslaw, and produce. P's & Q's also serves wine and hosts happy hour.

== History ==
The market opened in 2013. Paul Davis is a chef and co-owner.

Guy Fieri visited for an episode of the Food Network series Diners, Drive-Ins and Dives.

== Reception ==
Paolo Bicchieri included the business in Eater Portland's 2025 overview of the city's best restaurants for lunch.

== See also ==
- List of delicatessens
- List of Diners, Drive-Ins and Dives episodes
