= Five Points (Columbia, South Carolina) =

Area of Columbia, South Carolina, United States

Coordinates: 33.998903°N 81.015903°W

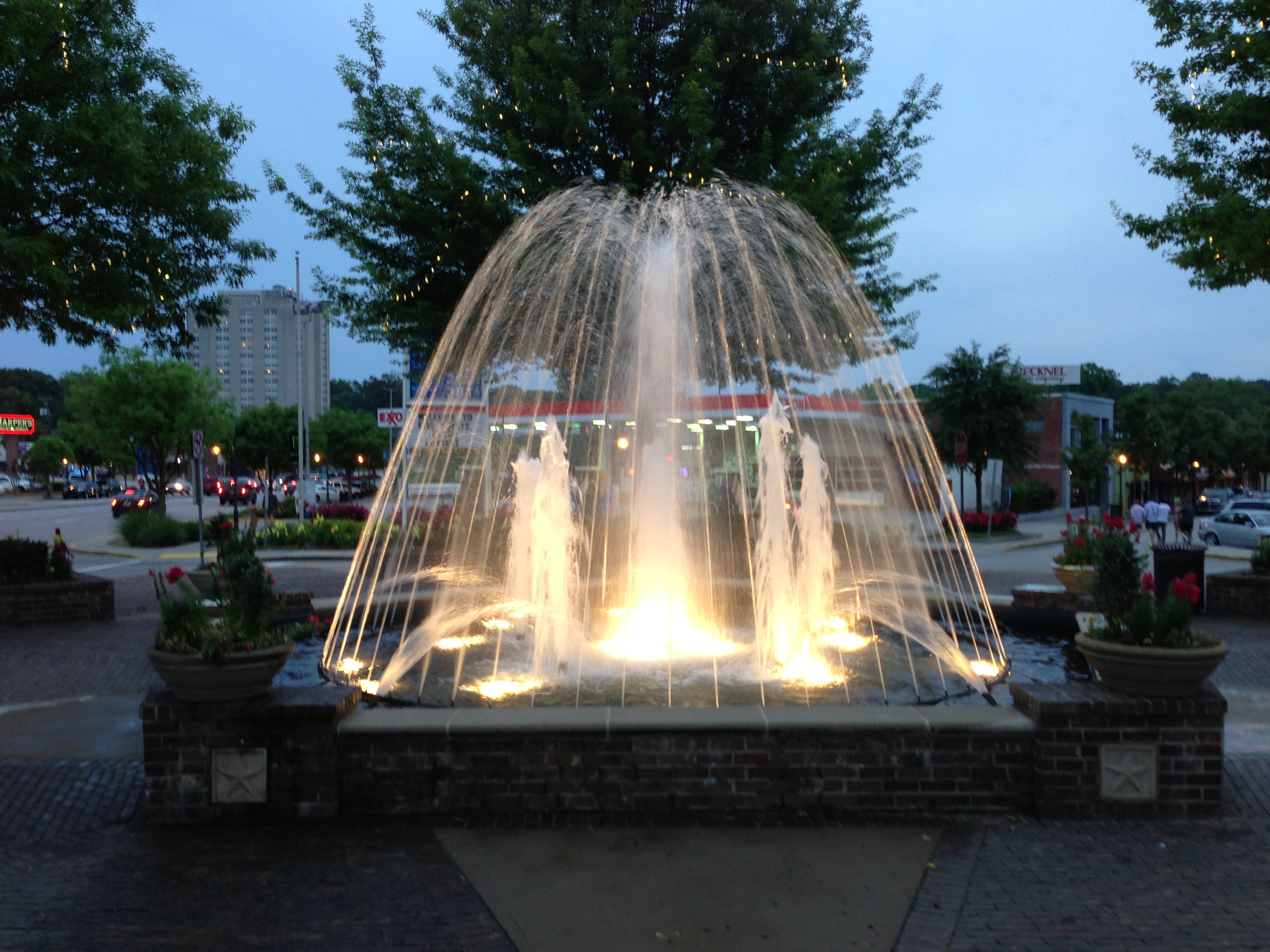
Fountain in Five Points at night

Five Points in Columbia, South Carolina is a shopping, restaurant, and nightlife area that attracts customers from the nearby University of South Carolina and the Columbia metropolitan area. It is the center for the city's annual St. Patrick’s Day Festival.

It was Columbia's first neighborhood shopping district, named for the intersection of Harden Street, Devine Street, and Santee Avenue. It was home to Columbia's first supermarket (an A & P), first Chinese restaurant (Kester’s Bamboo House), and the first bar in South Carolina to serve a cocktail (the Stage Door, which claimed to sell the state's first legal mixed drink after the South Carolina General Assembly approved the use of minibottles in 1973). Groucho's Deli founded in 1941, is one of the oldest continually operating restaurants in Five Points, and has grown into a 30-Location franchise across three states.

When streetcars were prevalent, Five Points was a hub (rotating circle) for moving between downtown Columbia and the residential area of Shandon.

In 2019, Five Points was added to the National Register of Historic Places.
