= Sebastiano's =

Deli and bakery in Portland, Oregon, U.S.

- The deli's exterior in southeast Portland's Sellwood-Moreland neighborhood, 2025
- Interactive map of Sebastiano's

Restaurant information
- Food type: Italian
- Location: 8235 Southeast 13th Avenue, Portland, Oregon, United States
- Coordinates: 45°27′47″N 122°39′12″W
- Website: sebastianospdx.com

Sebastiano's' is a Sicilian delicatessen, bakery, and market in Portland, Oregon's Sellwood-Moreland neighborhood, in the United States. Established in 2020, the business previously operated in the Montavilla neighborhood.

== Description ==
Sebastiano's is a Sicilian delicatessen and bakery in southeast Portland's Sellwood-Moreland neighborhood. Previously, the business operated in the southeast Portland part of the Montavilla neighborhood. It has served arancini, focaccia, muffuletta, pizzas, sandwiches, meats, cheese, cannoli, cuccidati, and wine, and the Italian market has stocked staples like farro, olive oil, pesto, and sauces. Other desserts have included brownies, cookies, and olive oil cake. The deli has also served granita.

== History ==
Inspired by a trip to Sicily, Daniel and Elise Gold opened Sebastiano's on June 2, 2020, in the space that previously housed Heartbreaker Neighborhood Kitchen. The couple announced plans to launch a food cart for weekend operation in the deli's parking lot in 2021. The food cart Aperitivo Sebastiano began operating in May. Sebastiano's has been a vendor at the neighborhood's Thursdays on the Plaza market.

For Thanksgiving in 2021, Sebastiano's collaborated with Dimo's Apizza on a takeout dinner. In 2022, Daniel Gold testified at a hearing, urging Portland City Council to extend the cap on fees third-party delivery apps can charge restaurants.

In 2024, the business relocated to Sellwood-Moreland. The business began operating in the new space on March 7.

== Reception ==
In 2022, writers included the Eggplant Muffuletta in Portland Monthly's list of the city's eleven best sandwiches. The magazine's Karen Brooks and Katherine Chew Hamilton included the business in an "opinionated guide to Portland's best bakeries", in which they said "the cannoli are the best in town". Brooks also included Sebastiano's in Portland Monthly's 2022 list of "our favorite patios for drinking and soaking up sun".

Brooke Jackson-Glidden included Sebastiano's in Eater Portland's 2021 lists of "ideal Portland spots to load up on picnic supplies" and fifteen eateries "where you can also buy your groceries". The website's Alex Frane included the business in a 2022 list of fifteen "stellar" Italian restaurants in Portland. He and Nathan Williams included Sebastiano's in a 2022 overview of recommended eateries in Montavilla, and Michelle Lopez and Jackson-Glidden included the business in a 2022 list of "outstanding" bakeries in the Portland metropolitan area. Sebastiano's was included in the website's 2025 lists of Portland's best restaurants for Italian food and mid-week lunches. Paolo Bicchieri included the business in Eater Portland's 2025 overview of the city's best restaurants for lunch. Lopez and Janey Wong also included Sebastiano's in a 2025 overview of Portland's best bakeries.

== See also ==
- List of bakeries
- List of delicatessens
- List of Italian restaurants
