= Chick's Deli =

Coordinates: 39.91648°N 75.02125°W

- Interactive map of Chick's Deli

Restaurant information
- Established: 1957
- Owner: Joseph Danfield
- Previous owner: Frank DeGregorio
- Food type: North American cuisine
- Dress code: Casual
- Location: 906 Township Lane, Cherry Hill, New Jersey, 08002, United States
- Website: chicksdeli.com

Chick's Deli is a delicatessen founded in 1957 in Cherry Hill, New Jersey, United States, which sells various sandwiches. The deli is known for its hoagies and cheesesteaks.

== History ==
Chick's Deli was founded in 1957 on Township Lane in Cherry Hill, New Jersey across from the Erlton Fire Co. by Frank DeGregorio. The deli has remained in its current location.

== Ratings ==
Chick's Deli has won numerous awards and praise for its sandwiches and is considered to have among the best chicken cheesesteaks and cheesesteaks in New Jersey.

In 2003, Chick's Deli was the winner for best cheesesteak in New Jersey and Philadelphia.

In 2009, food critic Peter Genovese considered Chick's cheesesteak number 13 of the top "20 Jersey Food Experiences You Must Try Before You Die".

== See also ==
- List of delicatessens
