= Jason's Deli =

American casual restaurant chain

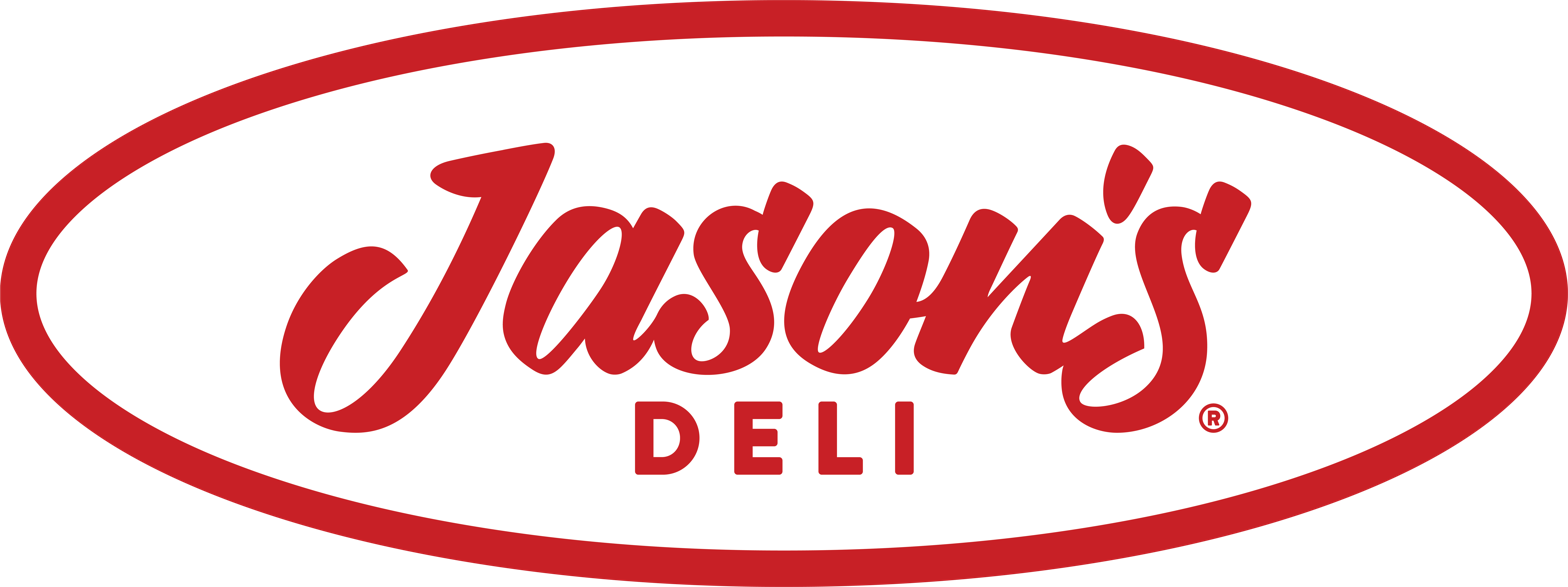

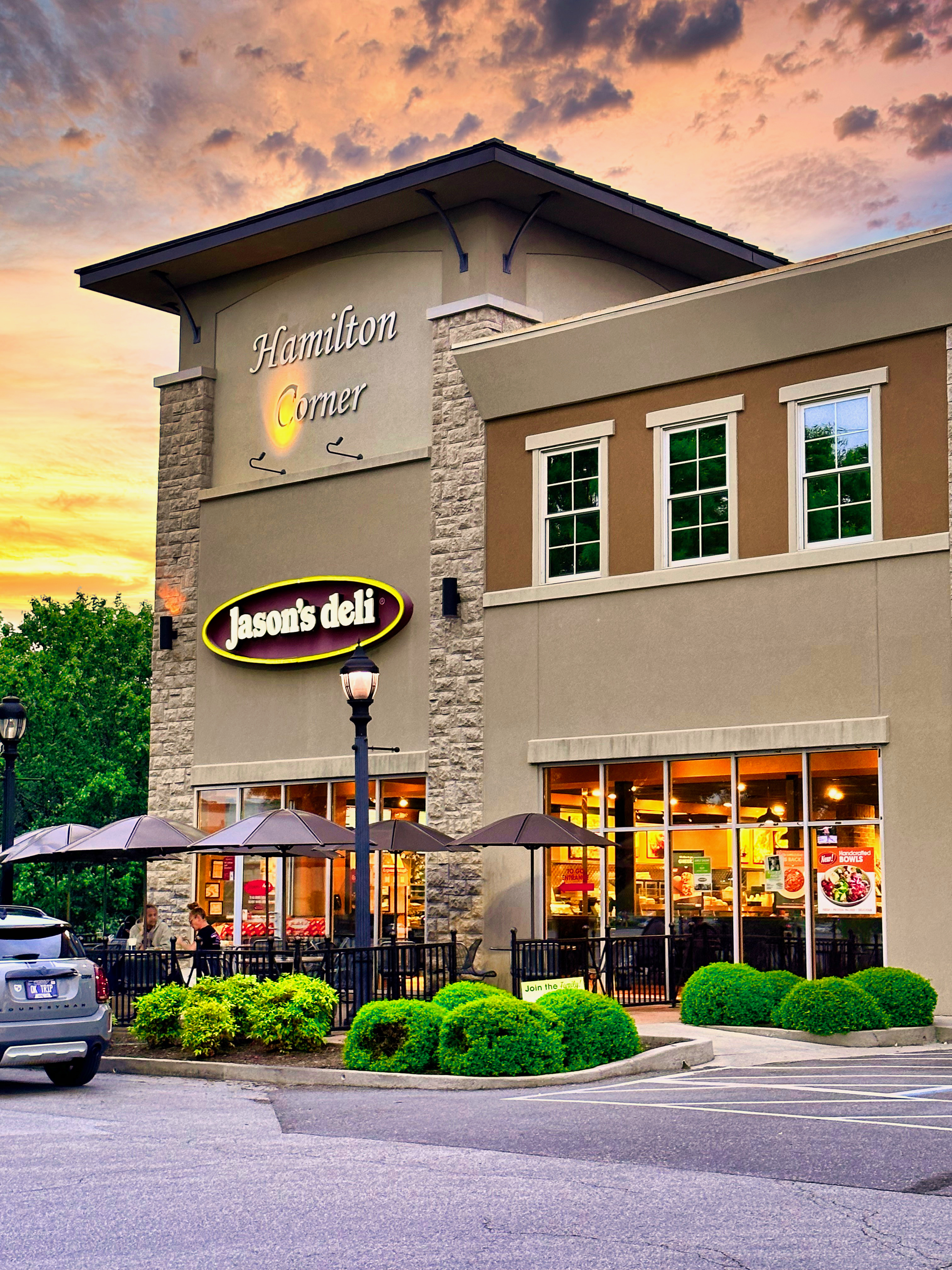
- Jason's Deli in Chattanooga, Tennessee
- Trade name: Jason's Deli
- Type: Private
- Industry: Restaurants
- Founded: November 30, 1976; 49 years ago
- Founder: Joe Tortorice Jr.
- Headquarters: Beaumont, Texas, U.S.
- Number of locations: 246 (2021)
- Key people: Troy Cormier, CEO; Ragan Edgerly, President; Blake Parker, Chief Innovation Officer
- Products: Sandwiches, Salads, Potatoes, Pasta, Wraps
- Revenue: ▲405 million US$ (2021)
- Owner: Tortorice family
- Number of employees: 6,000 (2021)
- Website: jasonsdeli.com

Jason's Deli is an American chain of fast casual restaurants founded in 1976 in Beaumont, Texas, by Joe Tortorice, Jr. There are currently over 245 locations in 29 states. The menu includes sandwiches, wraps, baked potatoes, pasta, soups, salads, and desserts, as well as catering items such as boxed lunches.

== History ==
It was founded in Beaumont, Texas on 30 November 1976 by Joe Tortorice Jr. and his partners Rusty Coco, Pete Verde and Pat Broussard. It was named for Tortorice's eldest son, Jay.

Joe and Rusty grew up in the food business. Their fathers owned neighborhood grocery stores in Beaumont. The original Jason's Deli location is still in operation at its original location at 112 Gateway St. The chain started franchising in 1988, with the first franchised store opened in Tucson, Arizona.

As of June 2025, there are 239 delis in 27 states. As of August 2008, Jason's Deli ranked #1 in annual sales in QSR Magazine's Top Ten list of restaurant groups with under 300 locations. The parent company, Deli Management, Inc., owns the majority of the deli restaurants.

In 2019, Joe died after a 19-month battle with cancer. He was 70.

== Menu ==
The company offers a standard deli style menu including traditional sandwiches such as Po'boys and muffalettas. Each deli has a salad bar and a daily soup selection. They also serve other items, such as baked potatoes, pastas and salads. The restaurants also have a free ice cream station.

In April 2005, the company completed a five-year plan to eliminate added trans-fats from its menu. In October 2008, the company eliminated high fructose corn syrup from its food.

Additionally, the company has eliminated MSG from all of its food.

Jason's Deli has also introduced gluten-free products. The deli also has ice cream for its customers, free of charge.

== Awards ==
Jason's Deli won the 2008 Nation's Restaurant News Golden Chain Award, and Restaurants & Institutions’ 2007 and 2006 Consumers’ Choice in Chains Gold Award in the sandwich segment.

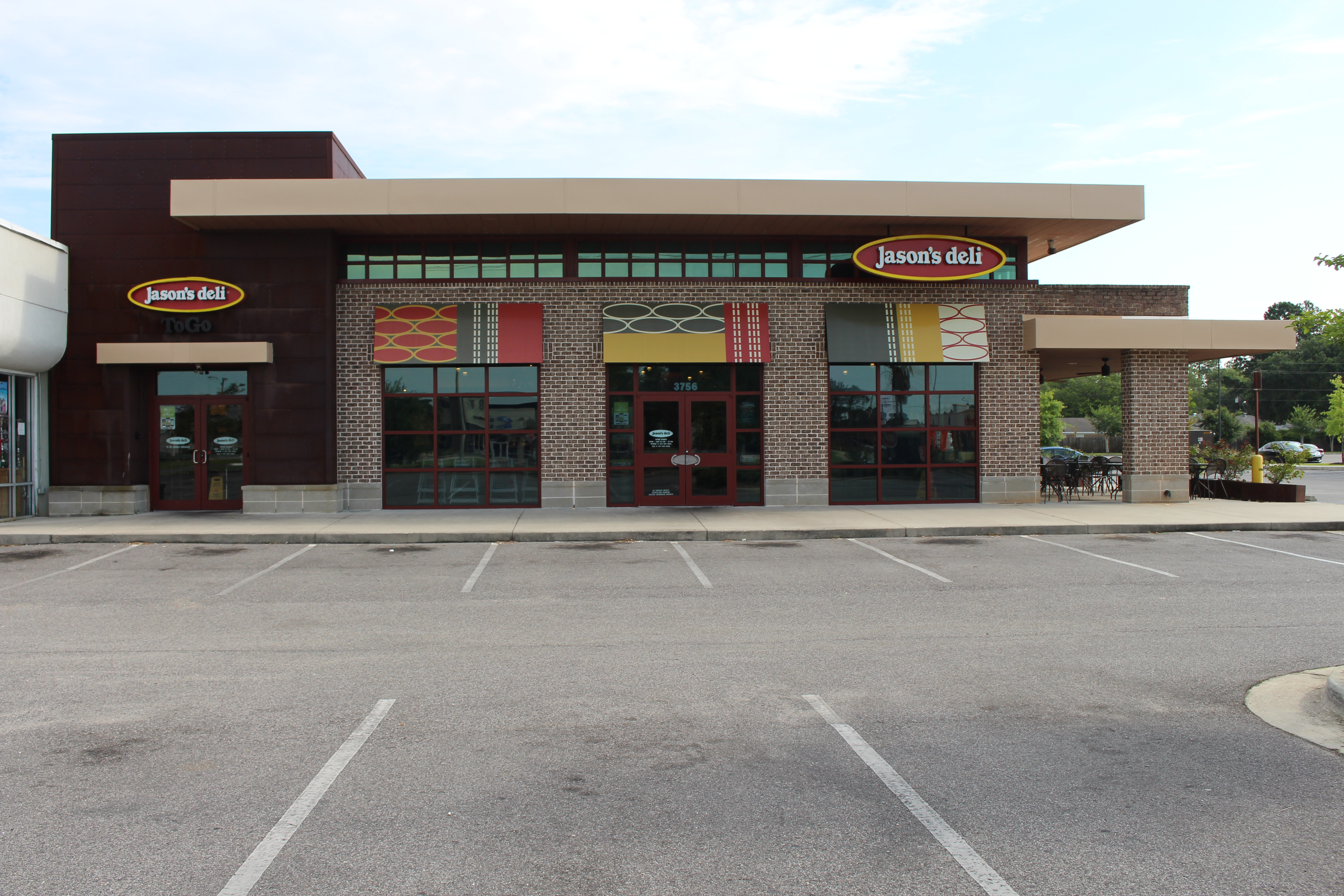
Jason's Deli in Mobile, Alabama

== Locations ==
Jason's Deli is found in 27 states.

- Alabama
- Arizona
- Arkansas
- Colorado
- Florida
- Georgia
- Illinois
- Indiana
- Iowa
- Kansas
- Kentucky
- Louisiana
- Maryland
- Mississippi
- Missouri
- Nebraska
- Nevada
- New Mexico
- North Carolina
- Ohio
- Oklahoma
- Pennsylvania
- South Carolina
- Tennessee
- Texas
- Virginia
- Wisconsin

== See also ==
- List of delicatessens
