= ScandiKitchen =

Coordinates: 51.5189°N 0.1406°W

- Interactive map of ScandiKitchen

Restaurant information
- Established: 10 July 2007
- Food type: Scandinavian
- Location: 61 Great Titchfield St, West End, London, W1W 7PP, United Kingdom
- Website: www.scandikitchen.co.uk

ScandiKitchen

ScandiKitchen is a Scandinavian delicatessen and grocery store at 61 Great Titchfield Street in the West End of London. Its menu is based on the smörgåsbord and the Danish smørrebrød (open sandwich) and draws on the Scandinavian tradition of uncomplicated food served on rye bread. The Kitchen's grocery section stocks over 600 food products from all over Scandinavia including a large selection of pickled herring, specialty cheeses and crisp bread, as well as chocolate and salty liquorice. Opened in 2007, it was the first Scandinavian delicatessen to open in London.

== See also ==
- List of delicatessens
- List of restaurants in London
