= Devil's Dill Sandwich Shop =

Restaurant in Portland, Oregon, U.S.

- Interactive map of Devil's Dill Sandwich Shop

Restaurant information
- Location: 1711 Southeast Hawthorne Boulevard, Portland, Multnomah, Oregon, 97214, United States
- Coordinates: 45.5123°N 122.6482°W
- Website: devilsdill.com

Devil's Dill Sandwich Shop is a restaurant in Portland, Oregon, United States. Established in 2013, the delicatessen and sandwich bar operates on Hawthorne Boulevard in southeast Portland's Buckman neighborhood. In 2015, the business opened the attached No Fun Bar.

== Description ==
Devil's Dill operates on the north side of Hawthorne Boulevard in southeast Portland's Buckman neighborhood, at the boundary with Ladd's Addition and the larger Hosford-Abernethy neighborhood. The delicatessen serves American- and Italian-style sandwiches. The menu includes a pulled pork sandwich with sesame coleslaw and a chili-garlic barbecue sauce. Another sandwich has asparagus, blue cheese, cheddar cheese, and tomato jam on ciabatta. Other options include red wine-braised beef with onions and peppers, as well as grilled cheese with vegetables or barbecue seitan. Bread has been baked by Fleur De Lis and Dos Hermanos Bakery. Devil's Dill also offers gluten-free and vegan options.

== History ==
The business was started by Gavin Duffy and Chris Serena in 2013. In 2025, Devil's Dill opened the attached No Fun Bar "mostly to appease Portland health code requirements for restrooms and on-premises seating", according to Willamette Week. Historically, Devil's Dill has stayed open as late as 3am; during the COVID-19 pandemic, the restaurant closed at 10pm at times, also operating via delivery and take-out. As of 2025, the Hawthorne location was the city's only deli operating late at night, open until 1 am Wednesdays through Saturdays and 11 pm on other days.

A fire damaged the building that houses Devil's Dill in September 2026. The business was able to continue operating.

== Reception ==
Michael Russell ranked Devil's Dill number 23 in The Oregonian's 2016 list of Portland's 27 best restaurants open late, recommending the tuna fish sandwich with lemon aioli. He also said the business was among the city's best sandwich shops in 2017, achieving "cult-favorite" status. In 2018, Russell recommended Devil's Dill for inexpensive late-night food. Willamette Week said the business offered "arguably ... the best meal available" late at night in Portland in 2017. Devil's Dill was also a runner-up and finalist in the Best Sandwich Shop category of the newspaper's annual 'Best of Portland' readers' poll in 2024 and 2025, respectively. The business was a finalist and ranked second in the Best Sandwich Shop and Best Late-Night Eats categories, respectively, in 2026.

Dan Schlegel and Michelle Udem included Devil's Dill in Thrillist's 2015 list of Portland's fourteen most underrated restaurants. Lee Breslouer included the restaurant in the website's 2016 list of the best late-night food options in 36 major cities of the U.S. Alex Frane included Devil's Dill in Thrillist's and Portland Monthly's 2020 and 2025 overviews of the city's best sandwiches, respectively. Thom Hilton included the business in Eater Portland's 2024 overview of the city's best late-night dining options. The website's Katherine Chew Hamilton included Devil's Dill in a 2025 overview of the best restaurants in the Hawthorne District.

== See also ==
- List of delicatessens
