= The Cheese Shop, Louth =

Delicatessen in Louth, England

Coordinates: 53°22′01″N 0°00′22″W

- Company type: Private
- Industry: Delicatessen
- Founded: Louth, Lincolnshire, England (2007; 19 years ago)
- Founder: Paul Adams and Steven Parris
- Headquarters: Louth, Lincolnshire, England
- Area served: Great Britain
- Key people: Paul Adams, Steven Parris, Corrine Smith
- Products: Artisan foods, most notably cheese, wines and ports
- Owner: Paul Adams and Steven Parris
- Number of employees: 8
- Parent: Say Cheese (Louth) Ltd.
- Website: www.thecheeseshoplouth.co.uk

The Cheese Shop, Louth is an artisan delicatessen situated in Louth, England, known for its large selection of artisan foods, especially cheese. The Cheese Shop has been featured in national newspapers such as The Daily Telegraph and its magazine and The Guardian, local radio and television on BBC Lincolnshire and BBC Look North, and national television episodes in The Hairy Bikers' Food Tour of Britain.

The shop supplies public houses and restaurants in the surrounding area, and stocks locally produced cheeses, including Lincolnshire Poacher and Lincolnshire Red, and Cote Hill Blue and Yellow cheeses.

In 2011 The Cheese Shop won the food category in "The Best Small Food Shops in Britain Awards", run by Mary Portas and The Daily Telegraph, being chosen out of a shortlist of three by The Daily Telegraph's food columnist Rose Prince.

== Awards ==
- Included in Rose Prince's Good Food Producers Guide 2010
- Voted number 1 in "The Best Small Shops in Britain Awards" in the food category, by The Daily Telegraph, in association with Mary Portas and Rose Prince

== See also ==
- List of delicatessens
