= Groucho's Deli =

Regional deli franchise

- Industry: Restaurants
- Genre: Deli
- Founded: 1941; 85 years ago in Columbia, South Carolina, United States
- Founder: Harold "Groucho" Miller
- Headquarters: Columbia, South Carolina, United States
- Number of locations: 32 (2026)
- Area served: 3 U.S. states
- Key people: Harold "Groucho" Miller (Founder); Ivan Miller, Bruce Miller, Deric Rosenbaum
- Products: Sandwiches
- Website: grouchos.com

Groucho's Deli is a deli franchise in the United States, with 32 locations across South Carolina, North Carolina, and Georgia.

The restaurant was founded in Columbia, South Carolina, by Harold "Groucho" Miller. It is known for its Trademark Subs and Salads and Unique Dipper Style sandwiches, and was named the most famous deli in South Carolina by Business Insider in 2020. Their motto is “Quality is the most important ingredient in a sandwich”, and their tagline is "Your Neighborhood Deli".

== History ==
Groucho's Deli was founded by Harold "Groucho" Miller in 1941 in Columbia, South Carolina, known at the time as "Miller's". Miller was born in Philadelphia, Pennsylvania, in 1899. Several years later, after his father's death, the family broke up and he was raised in an orphanage to help relieve some financial burden for his mother who was unable to care for all of her children. Harold was 9 or 10 years old. That's where he learned to cook. He became a cook's helper. He believed that the people who worked in the kitchen had the best lifestyle. Harold moved to Columbia, SC (where he had relatives) to recover from an accident. "Ethel had a sister here'" he said. "and we came down to visit her while I recuperated from an operation. That was in 1939." He opened Miller's Delicatessen with only a sense of humor and a handful of original recipes for potato salad, coleslaw, and various salad and sandwich dressings. During his recovery, his wife, Ethel, and his children, Ivan, Donnie, and Arlene moved to Columbia. Initially the delicatessen only had five little booths for people to sit in the back. Sometimes patrons sat on Pickle Barrels.

Miller became known among customers and Columbia residents for his resemblance to famed comedian and actor Groucho Marx, and people began to refer to him affectionately as "Groucho" in 1941. Miller's became Groucho's Deli in 1941. His son, Ivan Miller, told the Columbia Record in 1986:

“...when Pop first opened this store, Columbia was a small town, and everything had a label. Here he [Harold] was this really crazy kind of guy. Always joking, always had a big cigar and a mustache… He looked like Groucho Marx, he talked like Groucho Marx, and to Columbia, he was Groucho Marx. So that is how the name came about.”

— Ivan Miller, second-generation proprietor of Groucho's, Columbia Record

In the following years, the name was officially changed to "Groucho's Deli", and the restaurant moved from downtown Columbia, to the Five Points area of the city, a location which remains open today.

Ownership was passed down to Ivan Miller in 1965, and Harold "Groucho" Miller died in 1974. At this point, the restaurant began to transition to more standard deli food offerings, trademark subs and salads served with Groucho's formula 45 sauce, and becoming "less about the retail sale of exotic foods and more about feeding folks who wanted to sit down and eat."

In 2000, Bruce Miller, Ivan's son, became owner, and the restaurant opened its first franchise location in Lexington, South Carolina. Ivan Miller died in 2001. In 2026 Groucho's Deli celebrated 85 Years in business. Groucho's longevity can be attributed to strong community involvement and adapting to innovations in restaurant technology.

== Menu ==
Groucho's is known for its quality meats and dipper-style sandwiches, traditional deli menu, large salads, as well as its homemade dressings (including Formula 45 and Formula 95 sauces), and its potato salad and coleslaw. Groucho's has won awards in South Carolina for best sandwich, best delicatessen, best subs, best salads and best Sweet Tea by readers of The State Newspaper, Post and Courier Newspaper, Free Times Newspaper, and Columbia Metropolitan Magazine for decades. In the 1980s Ivan Miller introduced heart healthy and vegetarian menu items. In 2018 Groucho's introduced the "Healthy Lifestyle" section. Expanding the menu offerings to contain baby Bella mushrooms, organic harvest salad, and superfood blends.

== Locations ==
As of July 2026, Groucho's Deli has 32 locations in three states: Georgia, North Carolina, and South Carolina. Each location is a franchise (excluding the original in Five Points) and is individually owned and operated, with "exclusive distributor partnerships and extensive on-site training" to maintain consistency from location to location.Entrepreneur Magazine ranked Groucho's Deli #327 for franchising in 2015 and #11 in Submarine Sandwiches in 2022 on the Franchise 500.
