= The Cheese Store of Beverly Hills =

Gourmet foods store in California, US

Coordinates: 34.07053°N 118.357515°W

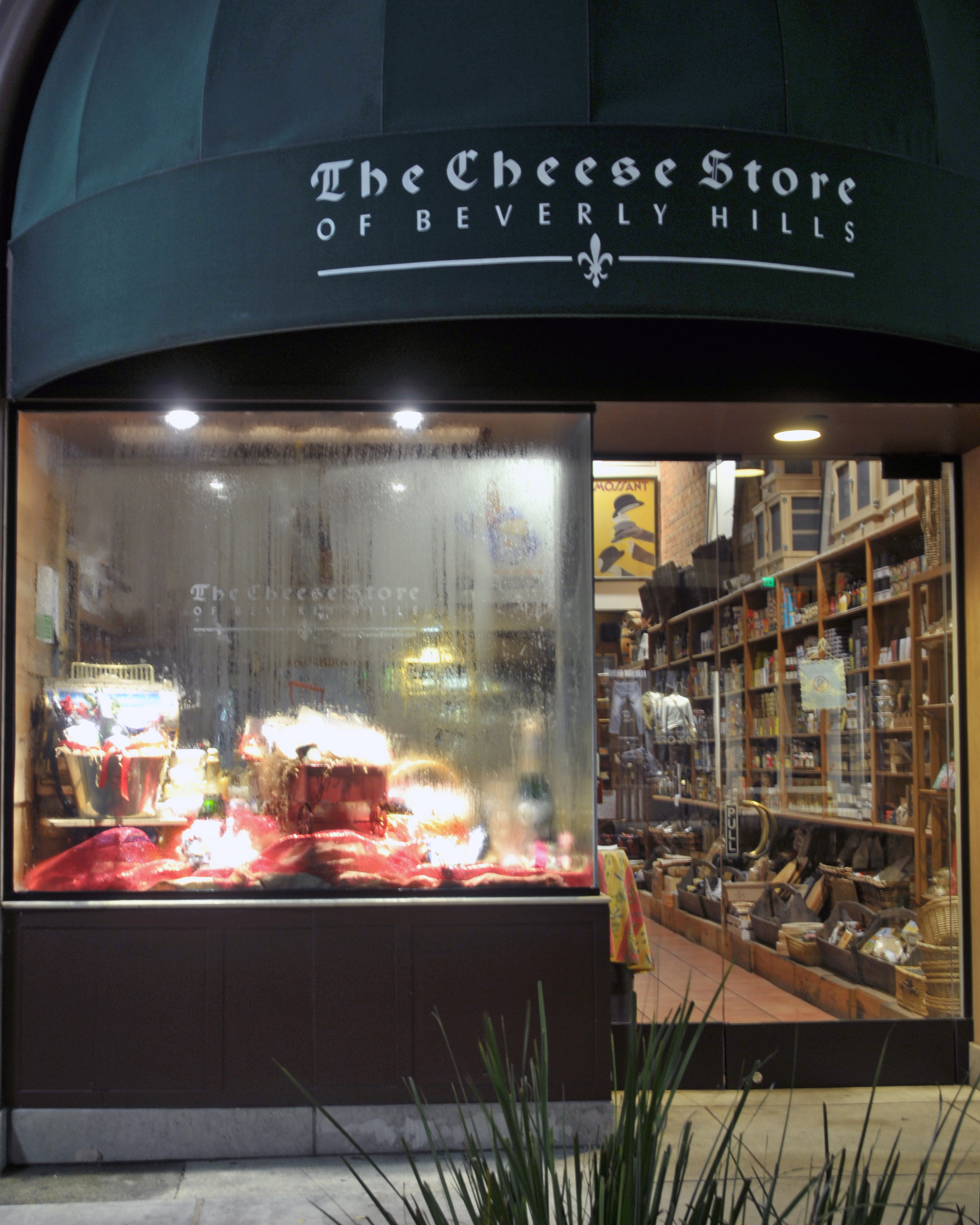
- The Cheese Store of Beverly Hills in 2015
- Type: Private
- Founded: 1967
- Founder: Sigmund Roth
- Headquarters: Beverly Hills, California, U.S.
- Key people: Norbert Wabnig
- Products: Gourmet foods, most notably cheese
- Owner: Dominik DiBartolomeo
- Website: Official website

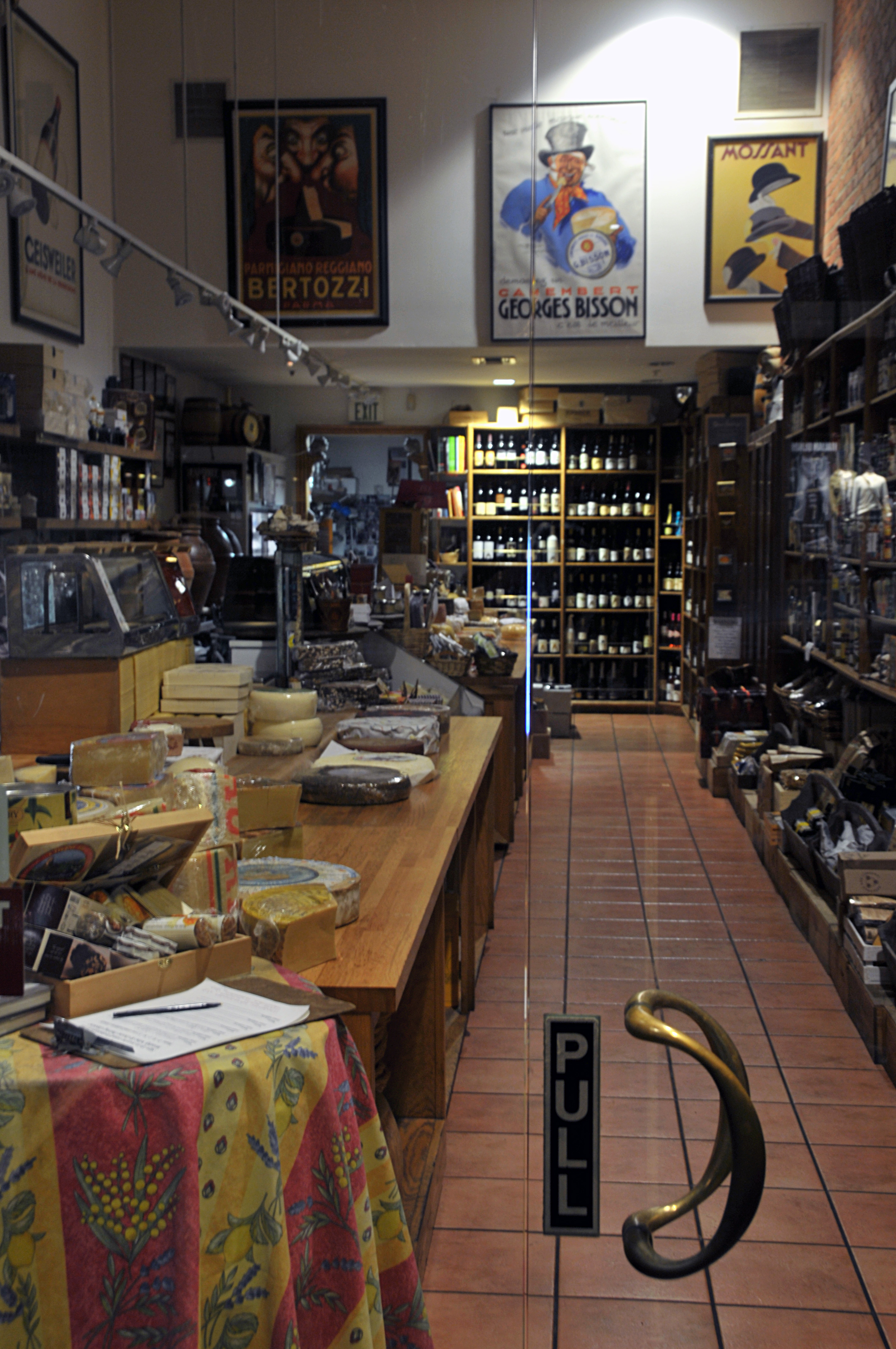
Inside the Cheese Store of Beverly Hills in 2015

The Cheese Store of Beverly Hills is a gourmet foods store in Beverly Hills, California, known for its selection of cheeses and other gourmet products. It also stocks wines and other delicacies, including the rarest of all caviars, Golden Imperial Osetra, and is often featured in publications such as Bon Appétit and Entrepreneur magazine. As of 2025, the store carries more than 500 varieties of cheese.

In 2022, longtime employee Dominick DiBartolomeo purchased the business from former owner Norbert Wabnig.

The store, originally housed in a refurbished 1920s brick building, has supplied many of Los Angeles' high-end restaurants past and present, including Wolfgang Puck's Spago, Valentino's, Patina, and Bar Marmont, as well as Las Vegas' Bellagio hotel. The change of ownership in 2022 was followed by a relocation and expansion the following year, and the offerings were expanded to include prepared foods such as sandwiches and salads.

== History ==
The Beverly Hills branch of Cheese Shop International, an East Coast-based franchise, was founded in 1967 by Colonel Sigmund Roth. In 1978, after a few years of Roth's declining health, Norbert Wabnig, who had worked at the store by day while pursuing his music career at night, purchased the business and changed its name to The Cheese Store of Beverly Hills. He transformed the store's feel from one of an upscale chain store to the more European style that it retains today.

As a way of recognizing the producers of handmade specialty foods from whom he sources his products, in 2004 Wabnig founded the American Artisanal Treasure Awards. Awards are presented for Best Cheese, Best Olive Oil, and Best Condiment.

In 2005, the store introduced its house wine, Scoundrel, a cabernet bottled by Sylvester Vineyards in Paso Robles, California. Wabnig's daughter, Talia, designed the label.

In 2022, longtime employee Dominick DiBartolomeo purchased the business from former owner Norbert Wabnig. In June 2023, the store relocated from its original location at 419 N. Beverly Drive to a larger space on South Santa Monica Boulevard.

== Products ==
The store is noted for its selection of cheeses and other gourmet products. Because of its epicurean nature, The Cheese Store of Beverly Hills has been known to carry hard-to-find and high-end ingredients, which over the years have included Austrian pumpkin seed oil, fresh truffles (in season), varieties of French butter, various kinds of Russian caviar (Golden Imperial Osetra and Sevruga), French and Spanish hams, Italian prosciutto, and 25 varieties of extra virgin olive oil. Customer are able to bring their own bottles to be filled with olive oil.

With the relocation to a larger space in 2023 the store expanded its offerings to include prepared foods such as sandwiches and salads.

== Owner ==
Founded in 1967, Colonel Sigmund Roth sought to build a store with exotic cheese and food at its core: a vision that was carried out by Norbert Wabnig when he took ownership of the store in 1978, shaping it into the LA institution that it is known as today. The Cheese Store of Beverly Hills now features over 600 cheeses sourced from around the globe, generously stocked luxury charcuterie, caviar, truffles, wine, spirits, sweets, specialty gourmet goods and more.

In 2022, Norbert sold the store to 20-year employee Dominick DiBartolomeo to continue the tradition and bring new energy to the store while paying homage to its history. In 2023, the Cheese Store of Beverly Hills moved to its new larger location on S. Santa Monica Blvd, allowing for an expanded selection of imported foods as well as a new menu of takeaway specialty sandwiches, salads and sides.

After the 2023 move, the store added a sandwich/cafe menu created with chefs Ben Seto and Hilary Henderson (formerly of Cut by Wolfgang Puck) In 2024, Forbes covered the menu and The Infatuation rate the shop 8.1 out of 10.

After the relocation, videos of the store's sandwiches spread on TikTok and Instagram, attracting younger customers. According to DiBartolomeo, the store's Instagram following grew from around 6,000 to approximately 280,000 over roughly 18 months.

The store was also featured in the Michelin Guide as a supplier of specialty ingredients to Michelin-starred restaurants, with clients including chef's Nancy Silverton, Evan Funke, and Mattia Agazzi.

== Awards ==
- Voted Best Cheese Shop in Los Angeles in 2007 and 2008 and 2009 by MyFoxLA.
- Awarded the "Best Gourmet Food Store" by editors and readers for Los Angeles' edition of the Best of Citysearch website poll in 2006 and 2007.
- Rated #1 Overall, #1 for Cheese, and #1 for Beverly Hills by Zagat every year from 1997 to 2001. In Zagat's 1999/2000 survey, it was one of only two food sources to receive a score of 29 points.
- Los Angeles magazine listed the store in its "Best of LA 1996."
