= Church of St. Catherine of Alexandria and St. Margaret, Kraków =

Roman Catholic church in Kraków, Poland

Church of St. Catherine of Alexandria and St. Margaret
- Kościół św. Katarzyny Aleksandryjskiej i św. Małgorzaty
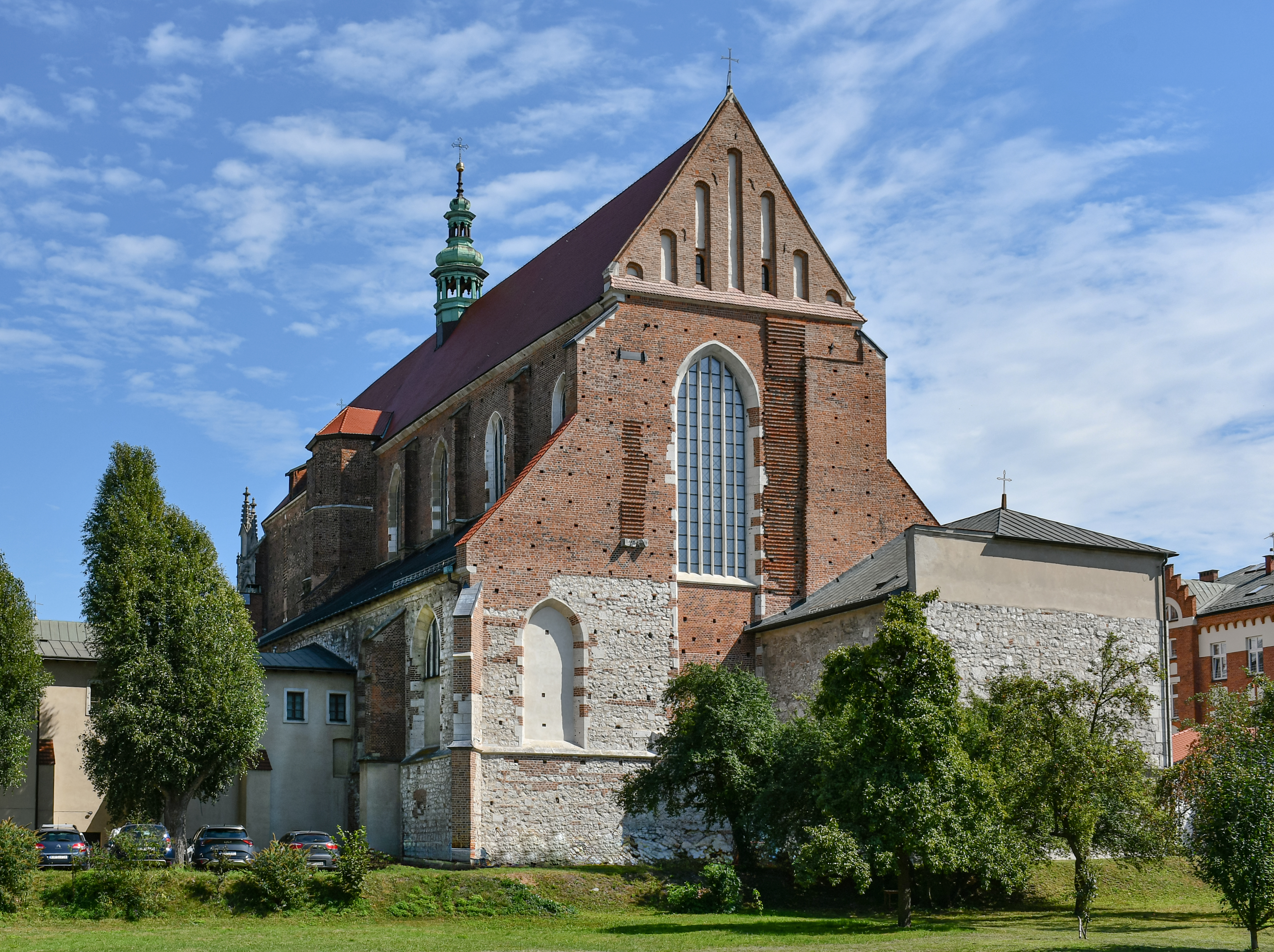
- View from the west
- Church of St. Catherine of Alexandria and St. Margaret
- 50°02′57.5″N 19°56′27.5″E
- Location: Kraków
- Address: 7-9 Augustiańska Street
- Country: Poland
- Denomination: Roman Catholic
- Website: www.kazimierz.augustianie.pl

History
- Consecrated: 1378

UNESCO World Heritage Site
- Type: Cultural
- Criteria: iv
- Designated: 1978
- Part of: Historic Centre of Kraków
- Reference no.: 29
- Region: Europe and North America

Historic Monument of Poland
- Designated: 1994-09-08
- Part of: Kraków historical city complex
- Reference no.: M.P. 1994 nr 50 poz. 418

The Church of St. Catherine of Alexandria and St. Margaret (Polish: Kościół św. Katarzyny Aleksandryjskiej i św. Małgorzaty), known colloquially as the Augustinian Church (Polish: Kościół augustianów) is a historic Roman Catholic parish and conventual church of the Order of Saint Augustine located at 7-9 Augustiańska Street in Kazimierz, the former district of Kraków, Poland.

== Church ==
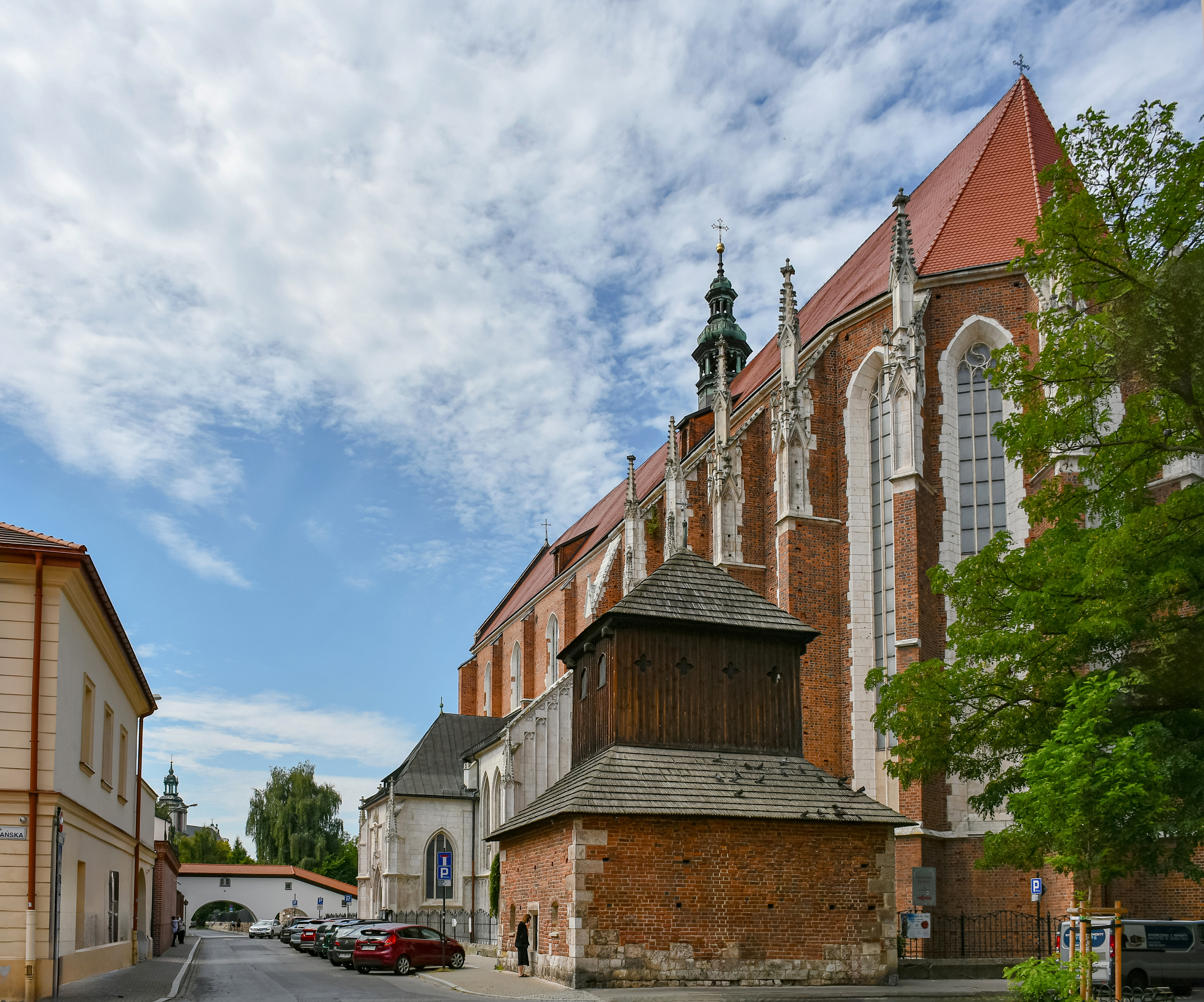
View from Skałeczna Street, bell tower and porch

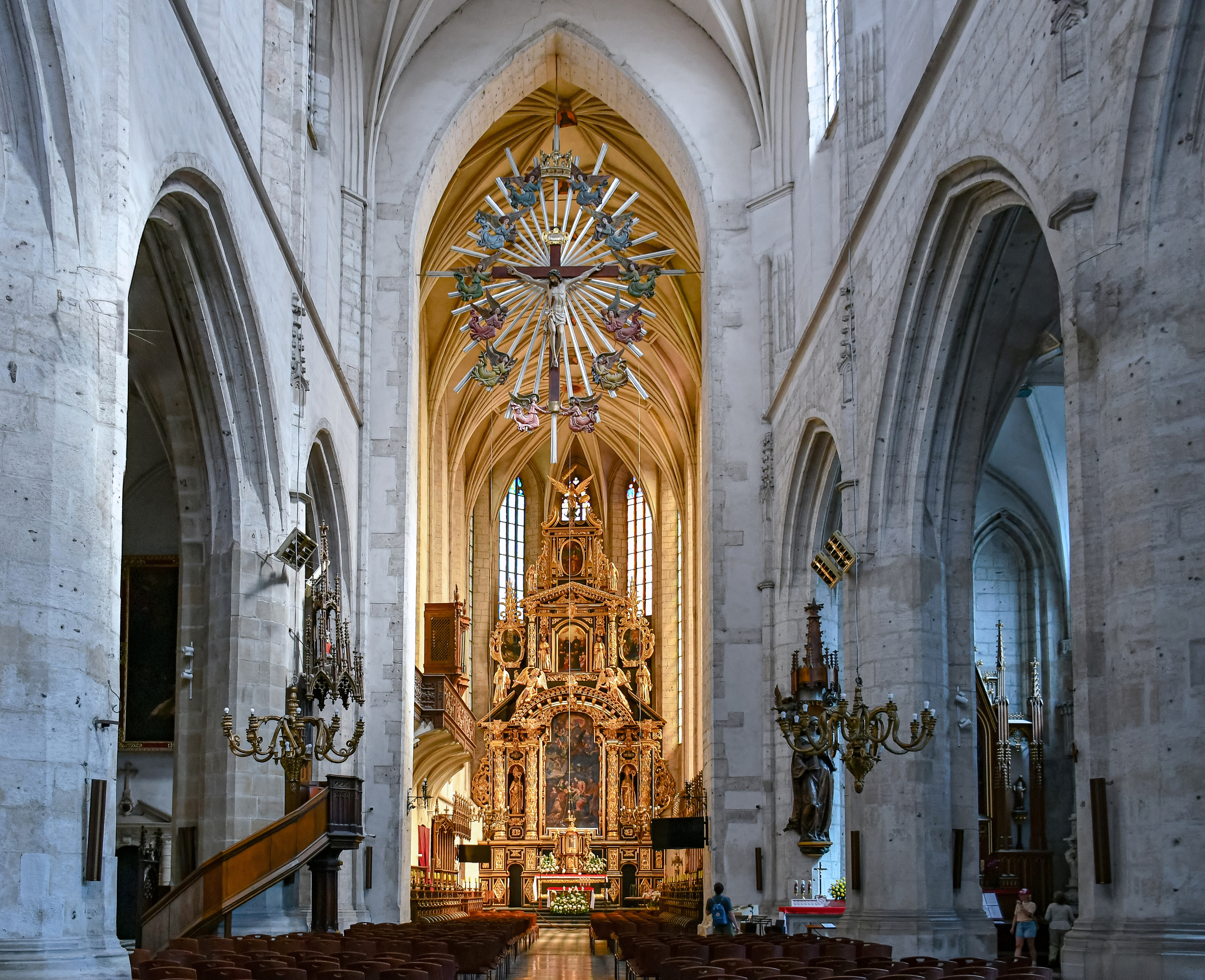
Main nave

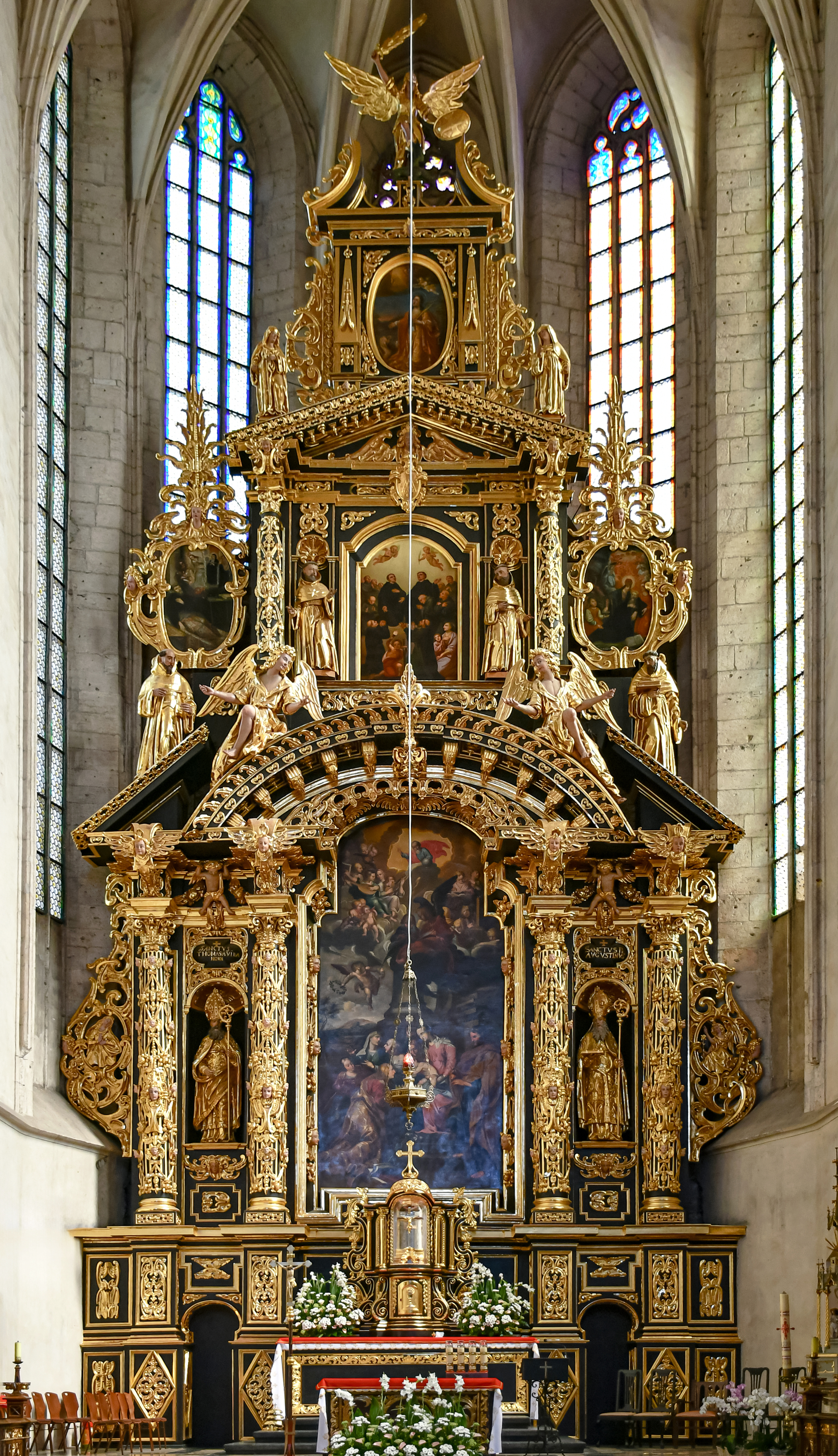
Main altar

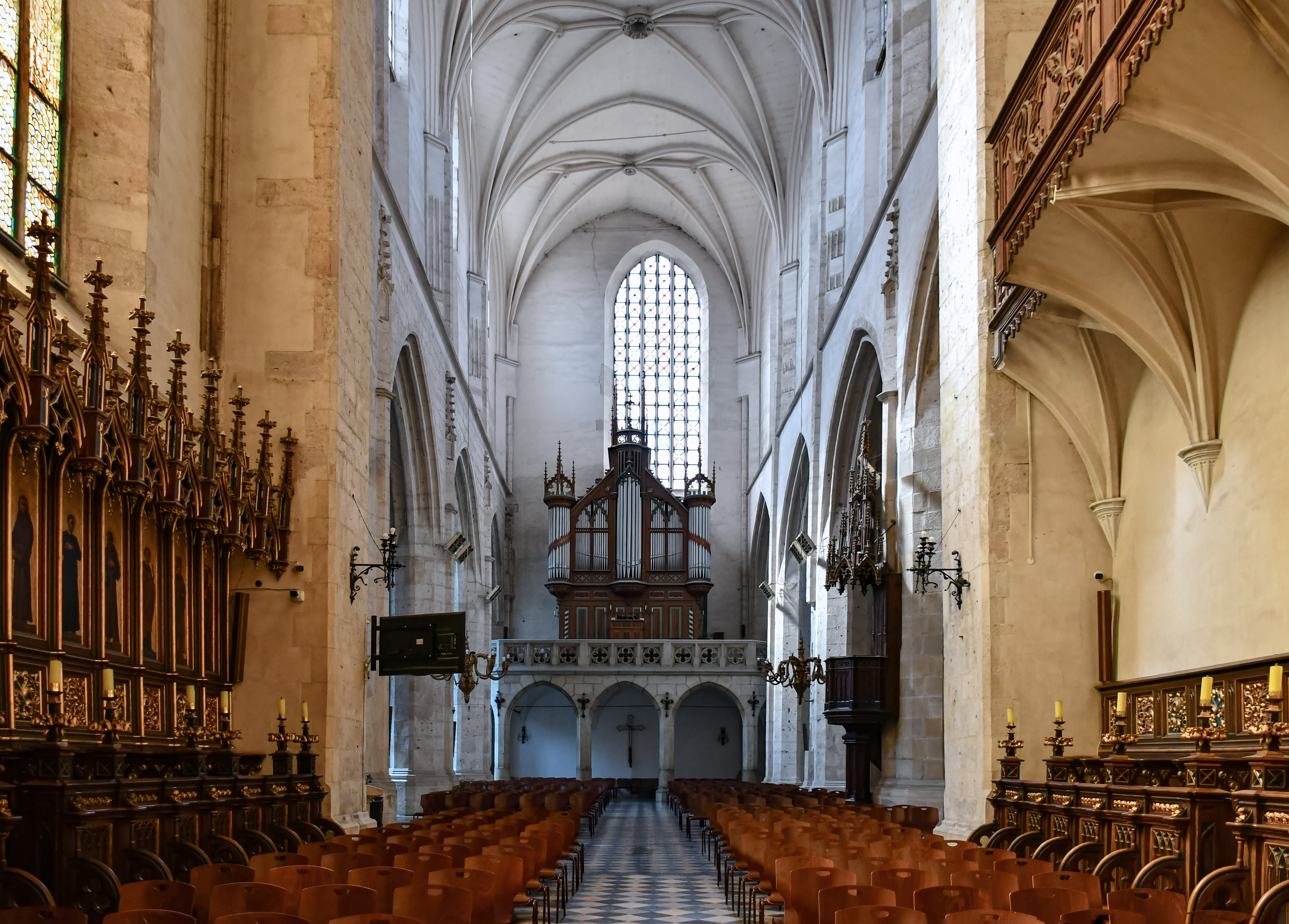
Main nave-pipe organ

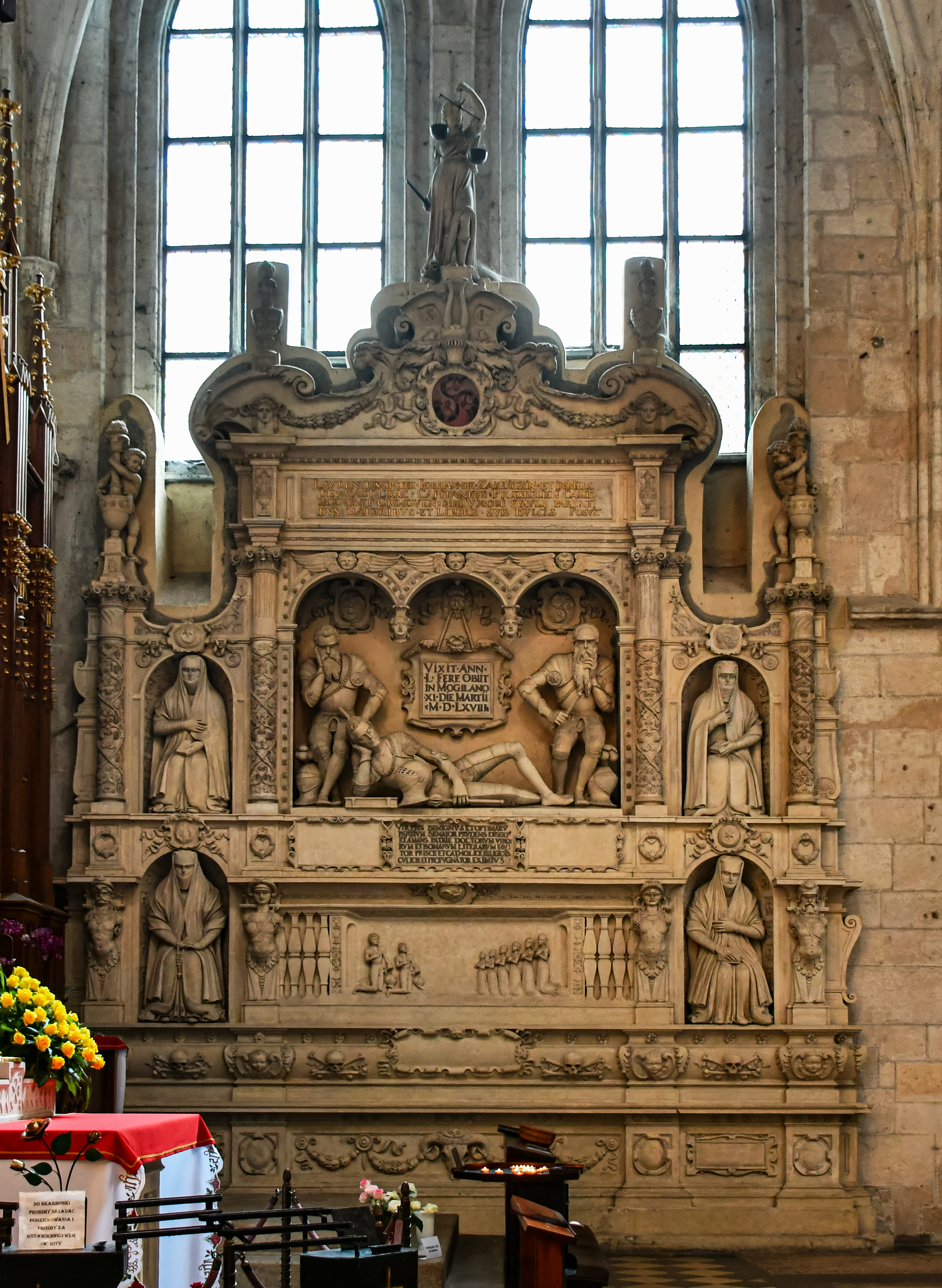
Tombstone of Wawrzyniec Spytek Jordan, ca. 1603

== Monastery ==
Augustinian Monastery, view from Augustiańska Street

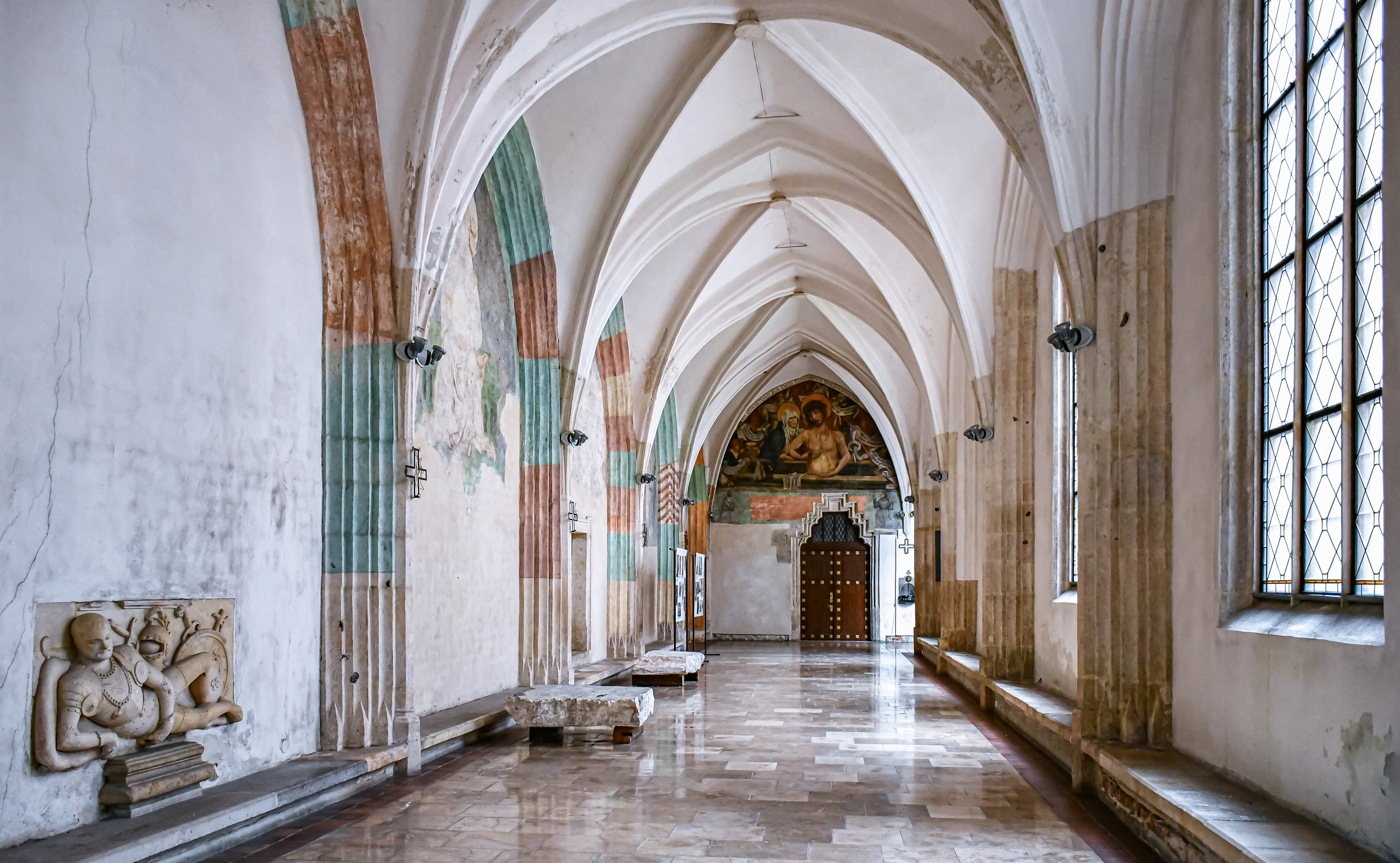
Augustinian Monastery western cloister

== Bibliography ==
- (in Polish) Michał Rożek, Barbara Gądkowa Leksykon kościołów Krakowa, Wydawnictwo Verso, Kraków 2003, ISBN 83-919281-0-1 pp 68-71 (Lexicon of Krakow churches)
- (in Polish) Praca zbiorowa Encyklopedia Krakowa, wydawca Biblioteka Kraków i Muzeum Krakowa, Kraków 2023, ISBN 978-83-66253-46-9 volume I pp 747-748 (Encyclopedia of Krakow)
