= List of Jewish cuisine dishes =

Below is a list of dishes found in Jewish cuisine.

== Traditional Ashkenazi dishes ==
Ashkenazi Jews are the Jews descended from the medieval Jewish communities of the Rhineland in the west of Germany. Ashkenazim or Ashkenazi Jews are literally referring to "German Jews." Many Ashkenazi Jews later migrated, largely eastward, forming communities in non German-speaking areas, including Bohemia (Czech Republic), Hungary, Poland, Lithuania, Latvia, Russia, Ukraine, Romania, Belarus, and elsewhere between the 10th and 19th centuries. As many of these countries share similar dishes, and were occupied by the Russian and Austro-Hungarian Empires until the end of World War I, the place where the dish originated is uncertain.

Name	Image	Origin	Description
Babka		Eastern Europe	Cinnamon and chopped nuts or Chocolate swirled into a challah (egg) bread/cake.
Bagel		Poland	Circle of boiled and baked yeast bread
Bialy		Poland	Similar to the bagel, but without the hole, filled with onions and other ingredients before baking
Blintz		Russia, Ukraine, Hungary	Thin egg pancake wrapped around a sweet mixture of farmer's cheese, potato, or fruit pie filling, similar to a crêpe, but with the ends tucked in and fried again in butter; often served with sour cream.
Brisket		Central and Eastern Europe	Braised meat from the chest area of a cow
Bublitchki		Belarus, Russia, Ukraine, Lithuania	Mini hard bagel-shaped sweet breads, commonly eaten with tea or coffee.
Challah		Southern Germany	Braided egg bread
Charoset			Apple and nut dish generally served at Passover
Chicken soup			A traditional soup for the Sabbath evening dinner, usually spiced with parsley and/or dill, and served with kneidlach or kreplach and vegetables.
Cholent/Chamin			A slow-cooked stew of meat, potatoes, beans and barley often served on the Sabbath
Chopped liver			Chopped or minced roasted beef or chicken liver, mixed with hard boiled eggs, onions, and spices.
Chrain		Europe	Pickled chopped horseradish, sometimes with beets.
Eyerlekh			Unlaid eggs found inside just-slaughtered chickens, typically cooked in soup
Farfel			Small pellet-shaped egg pasta. A Passover version made from matzo is called matzo farfel.
Gedempte fleisch			Ashkenazic pot roast, traditionally made with beef, various vegetables, tomato paste, and spices.
Gefilte fish		Central and Eastern Europe	Originally a stuffed fish, filled with a mixture of chopped fish, eggs, onions, matzo meal or crumbs, and spices. Nowadays, it usually refers to poached fish cakes or a fish loaf, sometimes made with matzo meal
Goulash		Hungary	Spicy meat stew
Gribenes			Chicken or goose skin cracklings with fried onions, a kosher food somewhat similar to pork rinds. A byproduct of the preparation of schmaltz by rendering chicken or goose fat.
Hamantashen			Triangular pastry filled with poppy seed or prune paste, or fruit jams, eaten during Purim
Helzel			Stuffed poultry neck skin. Stuffing typically includes flour, semolina, matzo meal or bread crumbs, schmaltz, fried onions and spices.
Holishkes; Huluptzes		Europe	Stuffed cabbage or cabbage roll: cabbage leaves rolled around a mixture of rice and meat, baked with tomatoes
Kasha		Russia, Ukraine	Buckwheat groats cooked in water (like rice) and mixed with oil and sometimes fried onions and mushrooms
Kasha varnishkas		Russia, Ukraine	A combined dish of kasha with noodles, typically farfalle.
Kichel			A cookie commonly made with egg and sugar rolled out flat and cut into large diamond shapes. Although sweet they are typically eaten with a savoury dip or topping.
Kishke			Beef intestines, stuffed with a mixture of matzah meal, spices and shmaltz, and boiled (like a sausage).
Kneidlach, matzah ball		Pale of Settlement	Dumpling made of matzah meal, eggs, and traditionally schmaltz, generally boiled and served in a chicken soup stock.
Knish		Pale of Settlement	A kind of turnover, filled with one or more of the following: mashed potato, ground meat, sauerkraut, onions, kasha (buckwheat groats) or cheese, and baked or deep fried.
Kreplach			Boiled dumpling similar to pierogi or gyoza, filled with meat or mashed potatoes and served in chicken broth
Kremzalech		Holland	A potato and shredded chicken pattie fried in oil, typically made for Passover
Kugel			Baked sweet or savory casserole made of noodles or potatoes with vegetables, fruits, fresh cheese, or other items
Latkes (Potato pancake)			Fried potato pancakes, usually eaten at Hanukkah with sour cream or apple sauce.
Lekach; Honey cake			Sponge cake with honey, cinnamon and tea.
Lokshen kugel		Poland	A sweet baked noodle dish often made with egg noodles, curd cheese, raisins, egg, salt, cinnamon, sugar, sour cream, and butter. Other versions are made without dairy ingredients and with other fruits such as apples.
Lox			Thin slices of cured salmon fillet
Macaroons			Sweet egg and almond/coconut cookies usually made Kosher for Passover.
Mandelbrot (cookie)		Russia, Ukraine	Hard, baked almond bread like Italian biscotti. (Also called mandel bread.)
Mandlach			Home-made "soup almonds" (soup mandel, soup nuts)
Matzah brei			A Passover breakfast dish made of roughly broken pieces of matzah soaked in beaten eggs and fried.
Miltz			Spleen, often stuffed with matzah meal, onions, and spices.
Onion rolls (Pletzlach)			Flattened rolls of bread strewn with poppy seeds and chopped onion and kosher salt.
Pastrami		Romania	Smoked spiced deli meat used in sandwiches, e.g. "pastrami on rye".
Pickled herring (Silodka)		Russia, Ukraine	Pickled deboned herring with onions; also mixed with sour cream.
Pletzel			Unrisen flatbread with sparse savoury toppings like onion
P'tcha (Galareta)		Turkey	Calves foot jelly
Rugelach		Poland	Flaky pastry spread with cinnamon sugar and chocolate chips or jam, rolled, and baked.
Shlishkes		Hungary	A twisted dumpling made with a potato dough (similar to gnocchi but for the shape) and covered with butter and breadcrumbs.
Schmaltz			Rendered goose or chicken fat (grease)
Schnitzel		Austria	Pounded cutlets of meat dipped in egg and crumbs or matzo meal and fried. Traditionally made with veal, it is nowadays usually made with boneless chicken breast.
Sorrel soup		Eastern Europe	Also known as shchav, green borscht or green shchi, it is made from broth or water, sorrel leaves, and salt. Varieties of the same soup include spinach, garden orache, chard, nettle, and occasionally dandelion, goutweed or ramsons, together with or instead of sorrel. It may include further ingredients such as egg yolks or whole eggs, potatoes, carrots, parsley root, and rice.
Soup mandel			See also mandelach
Sufganiot			Fried doughnuts, generally eaten at Hanukkah in Israel
Teiglach		Lithuania	Small sweet boiled pastries
Tzimmes			Sweet stew of carrots and yams, sometimes with raisins or other dried fruit such as prunes or apricots. It is usually vegetarian but can also be made with beef.
Vareniki		Ukraine	
Vorschmack		Russia, Ukraine	Also known as gehakte herring, chopped herring or herring butter. Strong tasting creamy herring spread, served on crackers or bread. Commonly used as a spread.
Yapchik		Hungary, Poland	Yapchik is a potato-based Ashkenazi Jewish meat dish similar to both cholent and kugel, and of Hungarian Jewish and Polish Jewish origin. It is considered a comfort food, and yapchik has increased in popularity over the past decade, especially among members of the Orthodox Jewish community in North America.

== Sephardi and Mizrahi dishes ==
This section makes reference to the cuisine of the Jews from the Mediterranean and the Middle East.

Sephardim are a subgroup of Jews originating in the Iberian Peninsula (modern Spain and Portugal). After being expelled from Spain and Portugal, they resettled in the Mediterranean basin, most prominently in Turkey, Greece, Morocco and Algeria.

Mizrahim is an umbrella term for the Judeo-Arabic and Judeo-Persian speaking Jewish communities from the Middle East, North Africa, the Caucasus and Central Asia. Although Mizrahi Jews are not descended from the Jews expelled from the Iberian Peninsula, they are also called Sephardi to contrast them to the Ashkenazi culture and religious rites.

As in the case of Ashkenazi cuisine, the place of birth of the recipes of the Sephardi and Mizrahi cuisine is generally uncertain.

Name	Image	Origin	Description
Adafina		Spain	a version of hamin popular among Spanish Jews
Baba ghanoush		The Levant (Syria, Lebanon, Palestine, Jordan)	Broiled eggplant mixed with garlic, lemon, tahini, and spices. Israeli Baba Ganouj is made with mayonnaise instead of tahini and is sometimes called salat hatzilim (eggplant salad).
Baklava		Turkey	Sweet dessert pastry made of layers of filo filled with chopped nuts, drizzled with syrup or honey
Bourekas		Turkey, Greece, Algeria, Tunisia	Small parcels of flakey pastry, filled with either cheese, potatoes, mushrooms or spinach, then baked or fried
Carciofi alla giudia		Italy	a deeply fried artichoke
Couscous		Algeria, Morocco, Tunisia	Crushed durum wheat semolina, steamed and served with vegetable or meat soup or stew
Falafel		Egypt, Israel, Palestine, Lebanon	Deep fried chickpea balls.
Fazuelos		Morocco	Pastries of thin fried dough.
Gondi		(Iran, Azerbaijan & Dagestan)	Ground chickpea and chicken ball, seasoned with cardamom, cooked and served as a traditional Persian and a Caucasian soup.
Hamin			a Sephardi or Israeli version of cholent
Hummus		Egypt, the Levant and Turkey	Dip made of mashed chickpeas, tahini, lemon juice and paprika
Israeli salad		Arab salad (mostly popular in the Levant (Syria, Lebanon, Middle East, Jordan)	Chopped cucumber and tomato cold dish, often served for breakfast
Jachnun		Yemen	Thinly rolled out dough, brushed with butter, oil, or margarine, rolled up like strudel and baked
Jerusalem mixed grill		Israel	It consists of chicken hearts, spleens and liver mixed with bits of lamb cooked on a flat grill, seasoned with onion, garlic, black pepper, cumin, turmeric, olive oil and coriander.
Kubba		Iraq	Round or oval savory croquettes made of semolina or bulghur [cracked wheat] dough, filled with minced onions and spicy minced lean meat (beef, lamb, goat or camel meat) and served raw, fried or cooked in savory sauce.
Kubba Bamia		Iraq	A stew made of semolina kubba, okra cooked in tomato sauce.
Kubba Shwandar		Iraq	A stew of semolina kubba cooked with beet
Kubba Matfuniya		Iraq	Ball-shaped kubba
Kubba Hamusta		Iraq	A stew of semolina kubba cooked in sour sauce
Mafrum		Libya	A stuffed vegetable dish made from root vegetables, typically potatoes, filled with ground meat and then fried and simmered in a tomato-based sauce.
Ma'amoul		The Levant (Syria, Lebanon, Middle East, Jordan	Date filled cookies
Malawach		Yemen	A flaky fried bread, similar to puff pastry, made by folding multiple layers of thin dough with butter, then cooking in a hot skillet.
Mofletta		Morocco	A thin crêpe made from water, flour and oil, traditionally eaten during the Mimouna celebration, the day after Passover. Mofletta is usually served with honey syrup
Oshi sabo/Oshi savo		Uzbekistan	the hamin of Bukharan Jews
Pita		Middle East	is a family of yeast-leavened round flatbreads baked from wheat flour, common in the Mediterranean, Middle East, and neighboring areas.
Ravikos		Turkey, Italy	Slow-braised spinach stems, cooked in broth or water.
Sabich		Iraq	A sandwich of spiced eggplant with hard boiled egg and pickles.
Sambusac		The Levant (Syria, Lebanon, Middle East, Jordan), Turkey, Egypt	Savory fried pastries made from flakey dough, similar to samosas, usually filled with chickpea paste or meat.
Shakshuka		Algeria, Libya, Tunisia	Eggs sauteed in a spicy tomato sauce
Tabouleh		Lebanon	Bulghur wheat mixed with parsley and other vegetables in a cold salad.
Tebit		Iraq	the hamin of Iraqi Jews

== See also ==
- Cuisine of the Sephardic Jews
- Israeli cuisine
- Jewish cuisine
- Jewish deli
- Kashrut, Jewish dietary laws
- Kosher foods
- Kosher restaurant
- List of kosher restaurants
- List of foods with religious symbolism
