= B&H Dairy =

Kosher restaurant in Manhattan, New York

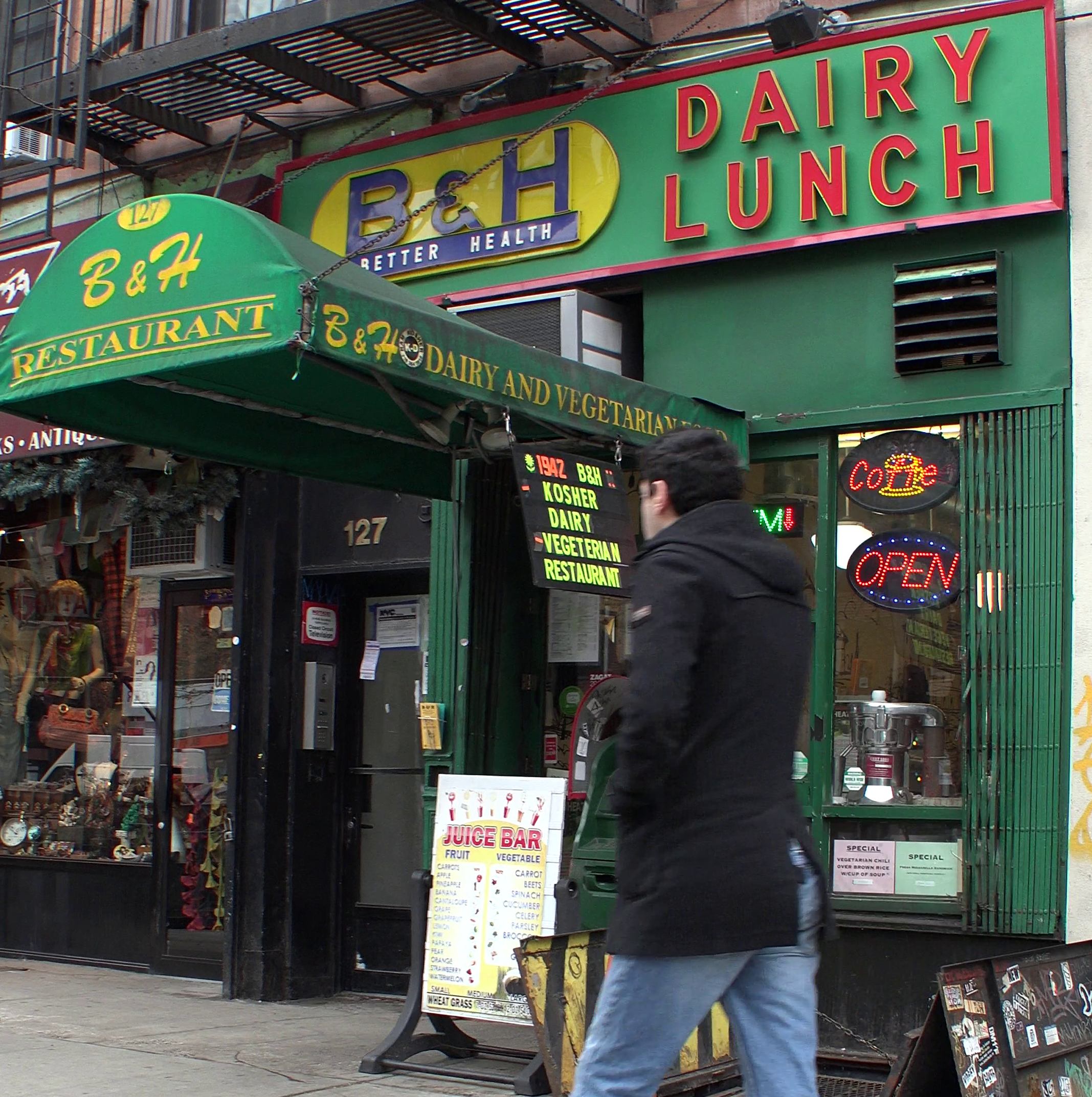
- Interactive map of B&H Dairy

Restaurant information
- Established: 1938
- Food type: Jewish cuisine
- Dress code: Casual
- Location: 127 2nd Ave, Manhattan, New York, 10003, United States
- Coordinates: 40°43′42″N 73°59′17″W
- Website: https://www.instagram.com/bandhdairy/

B&H Dairy is a kosher Jewish dairy restaurant or luncheonette in the East Village of Manhattan in New York City. The original owners, Abie Bergson and Jack Heller, later Sol Hausman, opened it in 1938 when the area was known for the Yiddish Theatre District. Bergson was an aspiring actor, and Molly Picon and Maurice Schwartz were patrons. Bergson sold the luncheonette in the 1970s and it went bankrupt in 1978. Bob Sherman, a partner in a construction firm, bought it. A 1940s style lunch counter B&H serves cheese blintzes with sour cream, borscht, matzo brei, and other kosher dairy Jewish cuisine known as milchik. It is owned and operated by an Egyptian Muslim and Catholic Polish couple, Fawzy and Alexandra Abdelwahed. In 2022, B&H received a grant (from the National Trust for Historic Preservation and American Express) to redo its landmark facade.

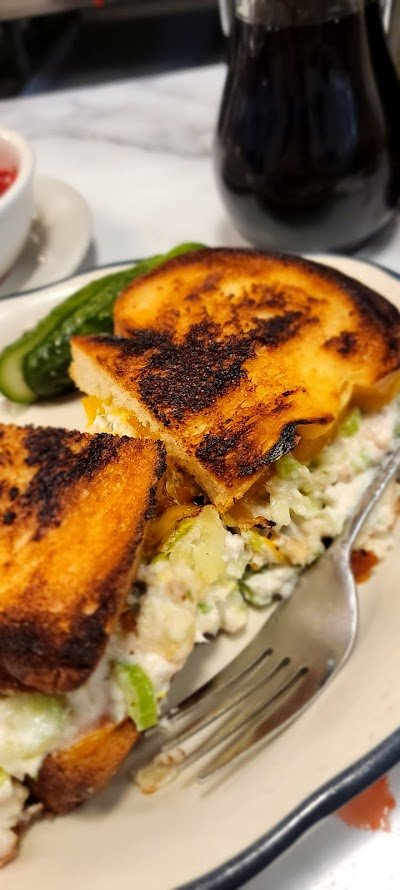
Whitefish salad melt from B&H Dairy

== See also ==
- List of Ashkenazi Jewish restaurants
