= Jewish dairy restaurant =

Type of generally lacto-ovo vegetarian/pescatarian kosher restaurant

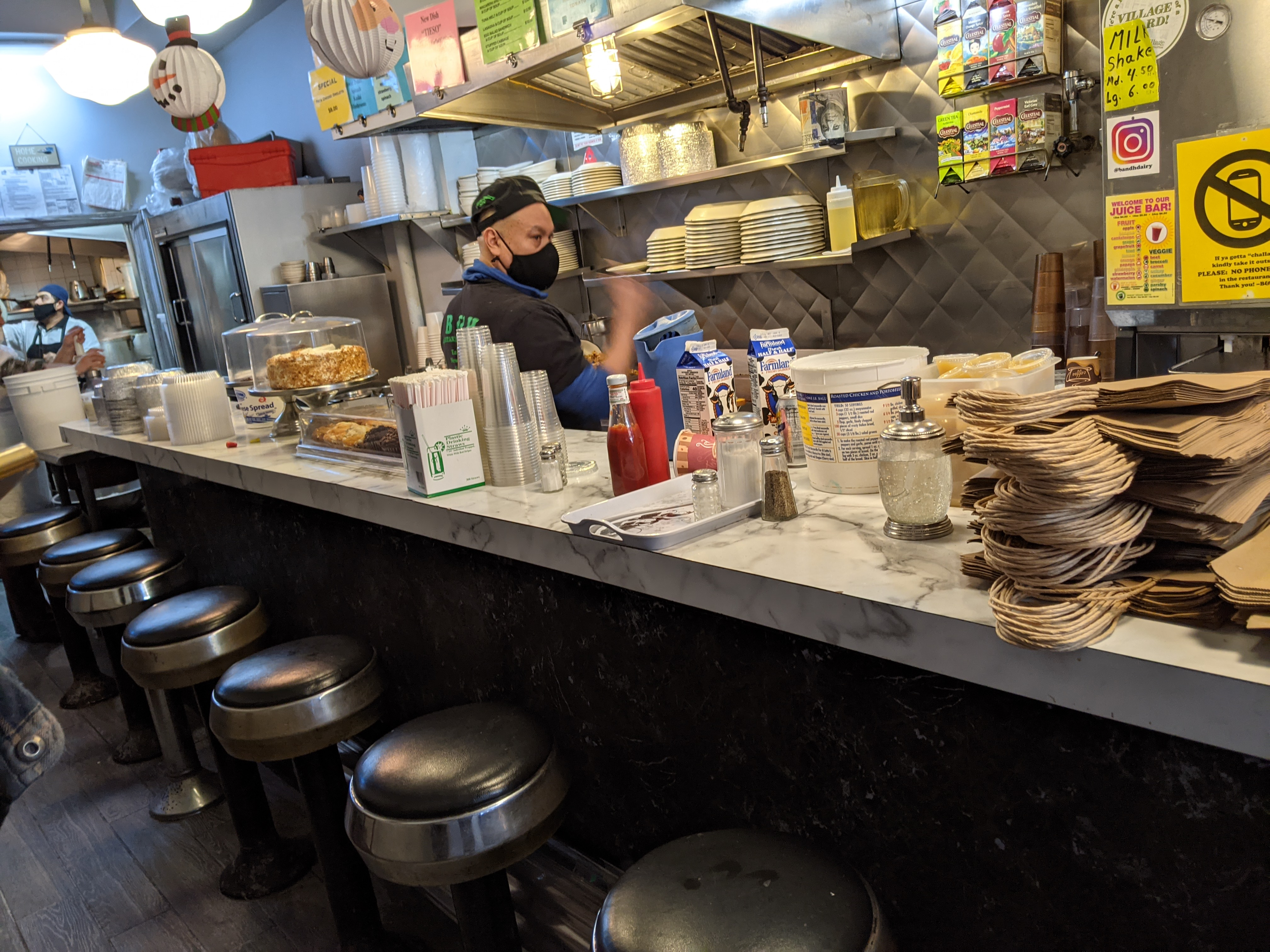
B&H Dairy is one of the few Jewish dairy restaurants still operating in the former Yiddish Theatre District of New York.

A Jewish or Kosher dairy restaurant, dairy lunchroom, dairy deli, or in Yiddish milchig restaurant, (Note: also spelled milkhik, milchik, and a meal or restaurant may also be milchediker or milkhidiker) is a type of kosher restaurant that does not serve meat under Jewish dietary laws, meaning eggs, dairy, and fish are permitted. Under this understanding of meat, the restaurants are thought of as and are nominally vegetarian. These restaurants are typically luncheonettes or diners that serve Ashkenazi Jewish cuisine, particularly American Jewish cuisine.

Descending from European "milk pavilions" and "dairy cafes," dairy restaurants were widespread in the late 19th and early 20th centuries in the United States, patronized by health- and cost-conscious customers, particularly immigrant families. They were important to the Jewish diaspora prior to their decline and modernization.

== Overview ==
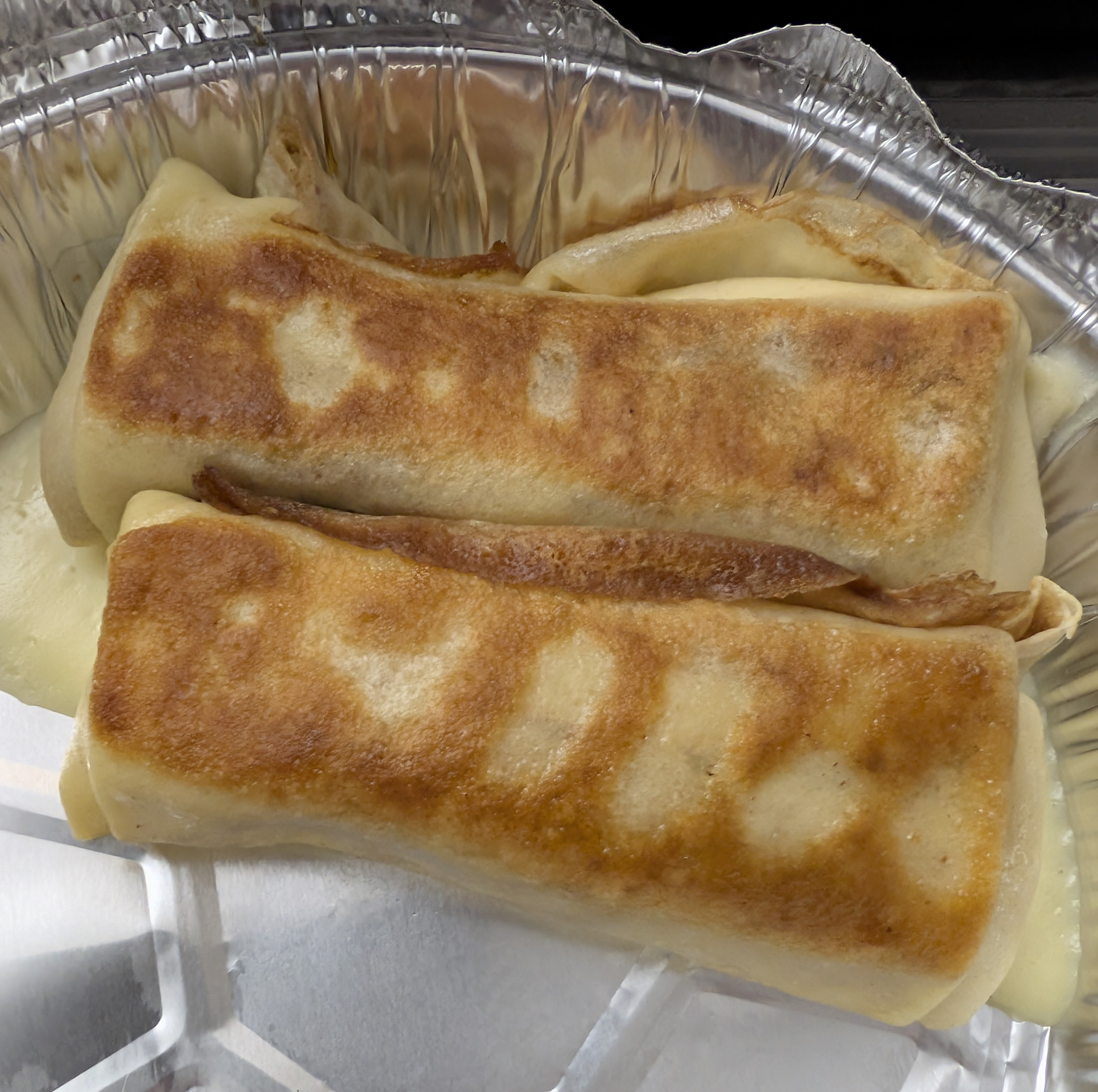
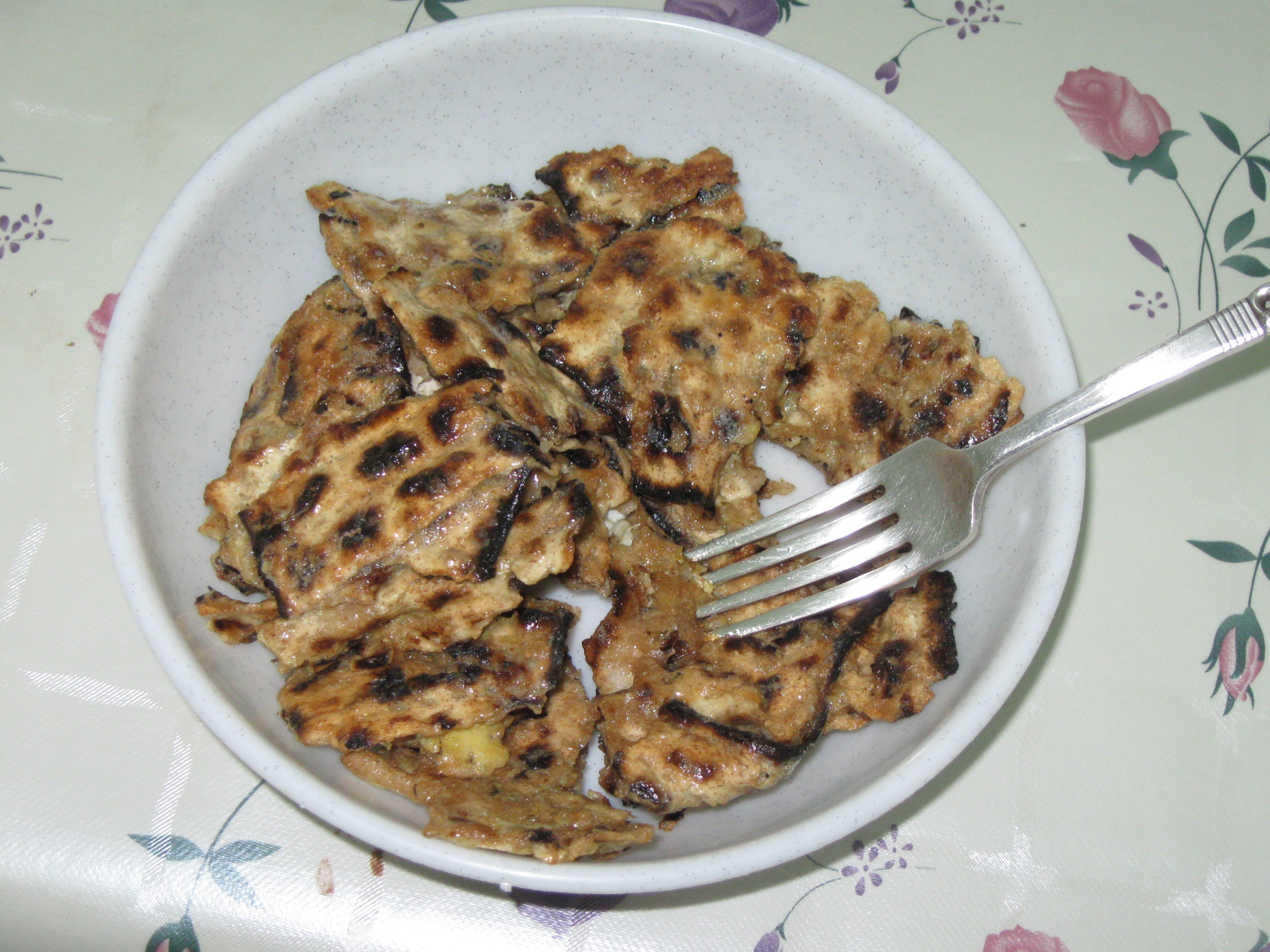
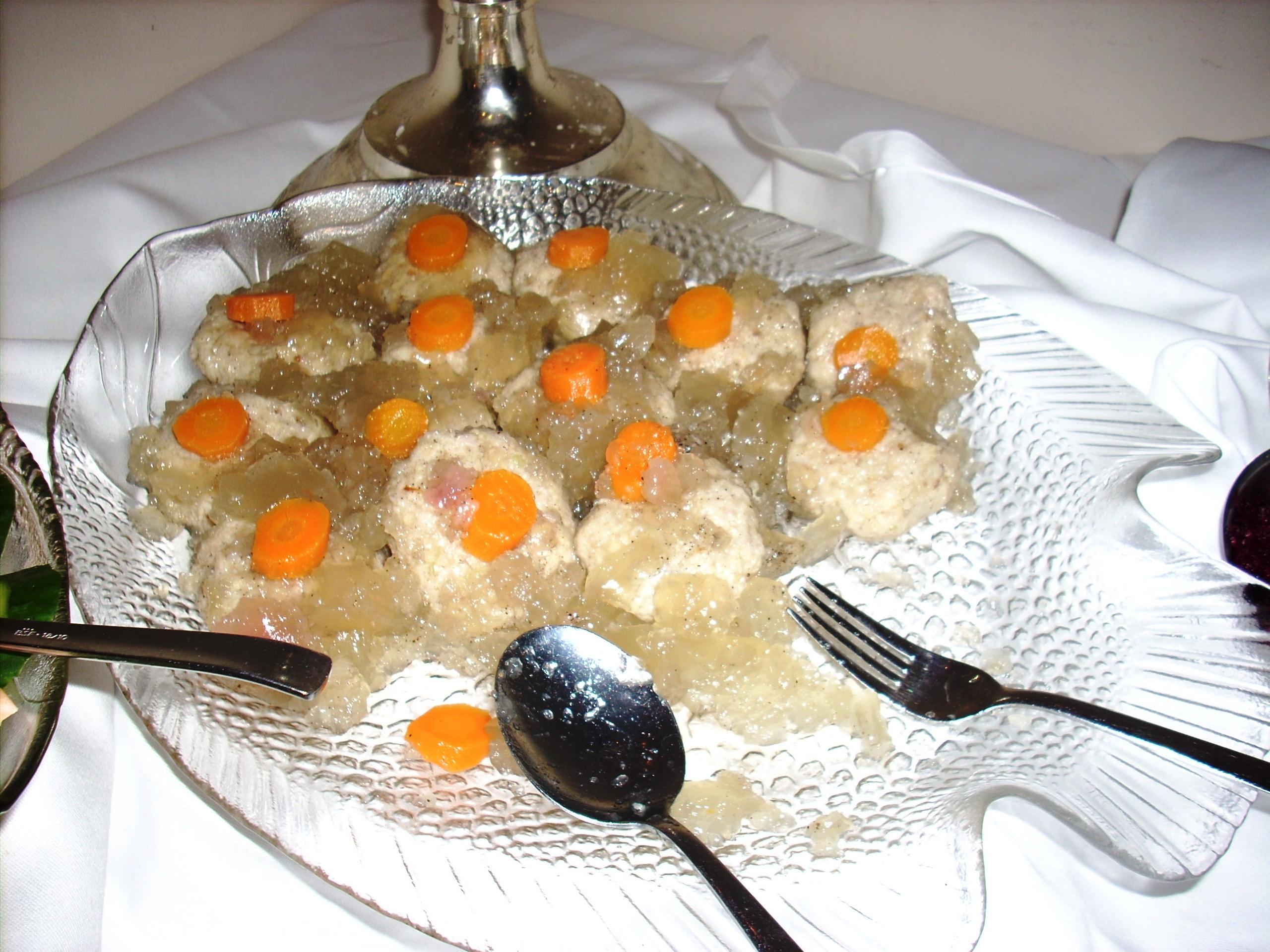
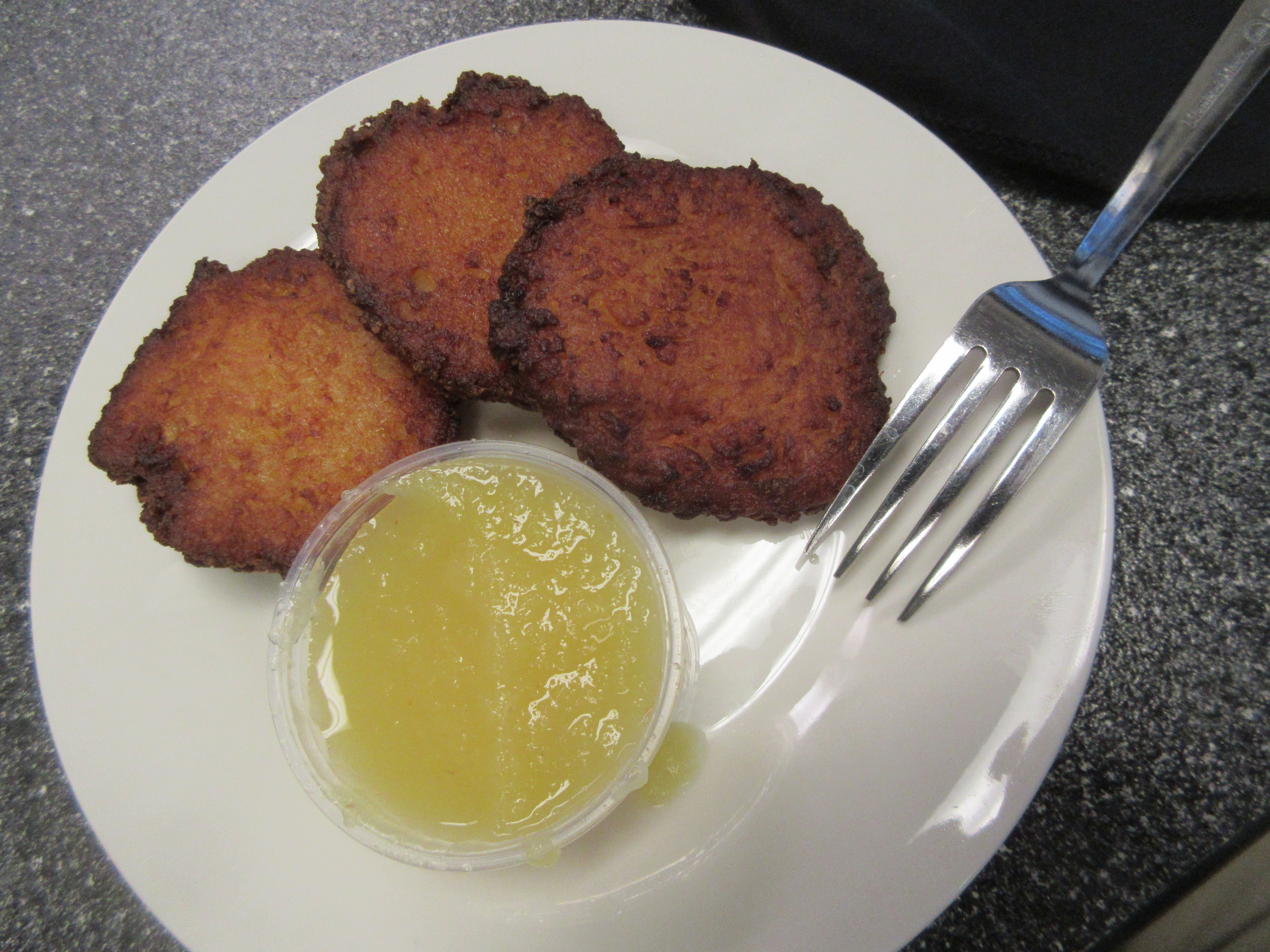
Clockwise: Cheese blintzes, matzah brei, latkes, and gefilte fish

Due to the strict rules for separating milk and meat in Jewish law, dairy or milchig (Yiddish: מילכיק) restaurants evolved as an alternative to Jewish delicatessens that specialized in meat (fleischig or fleyshik). They are generally ovo-lacto-pescatarian even though they may be referred to as "vegetarian" or "vegetarian and dairy restaurants"; some proprietors of kosher dairy restaurants added "vegetarian" to their name to attract additional clientele. Descended from the milchhallen or "milk pavilions" and mleczarnia or "dairy cafes" of Europe, they began appearing in the Jewish immigrant community of the Lower East Side of Manhattan in the late 19th and early 20th centuries, where there were at one time hundreds of dairy restaurants. Dairy kosher places were also found in Chicago and Toronto, as well as in the East End of London. Dairy restaurant menus include items such as potato latkes, gefilte fish, matzo brei, vegetarian (milkhiker) borscht, kugel, protose (a synthetic vegetable meat substitute), pierogies, milk toast, poppy seed cakes, buttermilk, cheese blintzes, and kreplach, as well as American dishes such as scrambled eggs and tuna salad.

Dairy restaurants were associated with the vegetarian movement and the healthy food trends of the day, with many advertising their health claims or including the word "health" in the name of their establishment and in their advertising. (Note: Katchor, pp. 125, 145, 242, 291-292, 395-397, 414, 419) Vegetarian eating was also touted as a way to save money.

Similar to a coffee shop or a community center, dairy restaurants were inexpensive meeting places and a third place for the more cost-conscious in the worlds of art, politics, and culture, as well as a destination for comfort food for first-generation immigrants. For second-generation and later generations of American Jewish restaurant-goers, the restaurants created a connection to their heritage and Jewish identity. Their status as neighborhood institutions created a connection with the history of their neighborhoods which extended beyond Jewish communities.

Perhaps due to its utilitarian style, the Jewish dairy restaurant has not been memorialized or preserved compared with the Jewish deli or other ethnic restaurant styles. They survive in advertising from newspapers of the time.

== History ==
=== Precursors ===
Precursors to the milchig restaurant include the milchhallen or "milk pavilions" of Germany and Austria, also called meierei (dairy farms). These were urban businesses that ranged from a kiosk to a large building which served milk, custard, cheese dishes, beer, cold cuts, and small sandwiches. Some of these dairy stands or milk shops had Jewish proprietors.

The mleczarnia were dairy cafes in Poland in the 19th century, perhaps based on the Parisian crémerie or the michhallen. Some sold kosher dairy dishes in Jewish neighborhoods and offered "consumption on the spot" for cakes and breads. The word also refers to a dairy, i.e. a place where milk was produced or sold, but came to encompass a type of eating house. The Polish mleczarnia became linked to nationalism and culture. Author Yechezkel Kotik ran a literary dairy cafe in Warsaw which inspired Sholem Aleichem's Menahem-Mendl stories. These establishments might have identified as dairies to avoid licensing requirements or surveillance that cafes were subject to. Antoni Lange and Bolesław Leśmian were among writers who participated in the Polish dairy cafe scene. However, in Poland, these were not considered restaurants. The Polish mleczny or milk bars are another format descended from the mleczarnia.

=== Dairy restaurants begin ===
Non-Jewish dairy restaurants in the United States existed, at least in name, in the 1870s, and became a widespread restaurant format. Notable early dairy restaurant businesses were opened by Frank Ward in 1887 in Washington D.C., J.A. Whitcomb in Baltimore in 1916 whose restaurant chain grew to 140 branches, a chain of 14 restaurants owned by Alfred W. Dennett in Boston in 1883, and Samuel Childs who operated 81 branches of his dairy lunchroom in 1916. These restaurants experimented with vegetarianism but also served meat. They were inspired by the temperance movement and the pure foods movement. Early dairy restaurants were similar to later Jewish kosher ones in their decor and spirit, but did not strictly serve a dairy menu.

Jewish restaurant culture in lower Manhattan was well-established in the 19th century. By 1905 there were hundreds of cafes and coffee shops. Immigrants from Romania in particular supported the culture of the Yiddish press, theater, and literature, and alongside immigrants from Poland and Russia, opened a variety of restaurants which became political and cultural gathering places. The earliest Jewish dairy restaurants appeared in the Jewish Lower East Side of New York and were noted by newspapers by 1919. The first popular Jewish dairy restaurant was owned by Jacob J. Kampus (Campus), who immigrated from Romania, and appears in an 1889 directory. An ad from 1900 advertises blintzes, kreplakh and mamaliga.

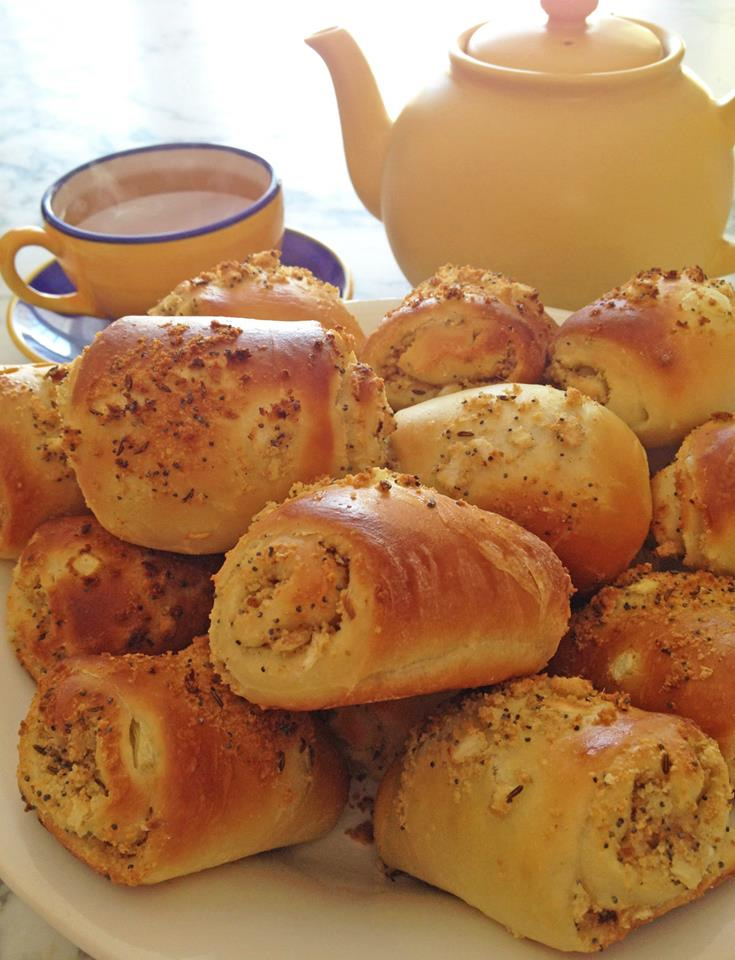
Onion rolls made with the recipe from Ratner's

According to Marcus Eli Ravage, Romanian immigrants originated the institution of the dairy restaurant. However, some restaurants were not Romanian-style and may have predated them. Jewish dairy restaurants proliferated due to the low barriers to entry for immigrant entrepreneurs, and a ready base of customers with experience with a taste for Eastern European Ashkenazic-style dairy cuisine. The restaurant business was experiencing an upswing in early 20th century New York. Upton Sinclair's The Jungle, which exposed issues in the meat industry, was translated by Abraham Cahan and published in Forverts in 1906, which popularized the benefits of a dairy and vegetarian diet and the unsanitary conditions of slaughterhouses. These restaurants catered to the desire to assimilate into American society.

The rise of New York's dairy restaurants was aided significantly by the emergence of commercial refrigeration and community complaints about expensive retail kosher butchers, which culminated in "meat strikes", such as the 1902 kosher meat boycott. The butchers blamed the Beef Trust, shippers, inspectors, and the kosher slaughter industry for raising prices. The rising prices caused New York housewives to riot on the Lower East Side and in Williamsburg, proclaiming that they would live on fish. This also resulted in citywide kosher meat shortages. By this time refrigeration had made fresh milk and cream affordable and safe, and alongside the shortage, made dairy an attractive alternative to meat. The growth in vegetarian diets, as promoted by progressive Jewish thinkers, also inspired a turn to dairy meals.

Some restaurants like Garden Cafeteria became meeting places for the Yiddish cultural intelligentsia. The Yiddish theater district around 2nd Avenue played host to many restaurants that opened up to serve the theater-goers and the performers during its heyday. Restaurants like Ratner's were frequented by Yiddish theater actors, were meeting places for political writers such as the Partisan Review writers, and later on became relevant to the 1960s youth culture. By the time Ratner's closed in 2002 it was barely operating at a break-even rate, due to rising costs. Many old-style dairy restaurants closed by the 1970s, in some places supplanted by a newer generation of kosher dairy pizzerias and falafel shops.

== Notable examples and patrons ==
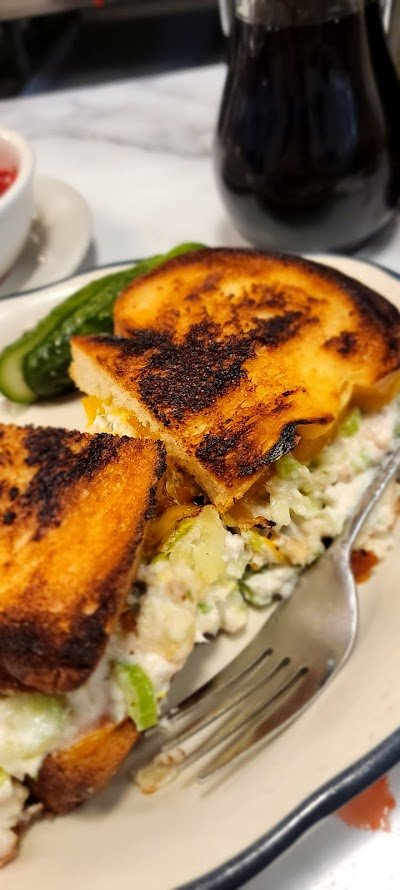
Whitefish salad melt at B&H

Notable examples frequented by Jewish immigrants and American Jews, among others, include B&H Dairy and Ratner's. As of 2024, B&H is operating as one of the few remaining Jewish dairy restaurants in New York's former Yiddish theater district, and is run by an Egyptian Muslim and Polish Catholic couple. B&H counted Yiddish theater actors Molly Picon and Maurice Schwartz among its patrons.

Steinberg's on the Upper West Side was beloved by writers and as well as those associated with the Yiddish theater, and blacklisted film industry workers such as Zero Mostel, as well as well-known actor Walter Matthau and singer Harry Belafonte. Another famous intellectual patron was author and Nobel Laureate Isaac Bashevis Singer, a noted Jewish vegetarian, was said to favor the Famous Dairy Restaurant on West 72nd Street.

The infamous gangster Meyer Lansky frequented Ratner's, where he met with Lucky Luciano. Ratner's later named a bar after him. The Lansky Lounge, a makeshift speakeasy with dancing, was located in the rear party room of the establishment, with a secret entrance in the alleyway and decor depicting East Side mobsters. According to Abraham Reinstein, the manager of Ratner's for nearly 40 years, Lansky would sit at a table in that room surrounded by bodyguards.

According to one story, Leon Trotsky was particularly fond of Triangle Dairy in the Bronx, whose waiters were Russian émigrés. There, he refused to tip as a matter of principle, insisting that a reliance on tips rather than a salary was "demeaning to the dignity of a workingman", and tried to persuade other customers to join him. In response, Trotsky received verbal abuse, poor service, and on one occasion had hot soup intentionally spilled on him by the waiters.

More recently, in Los Angeles, Steven Spielberg's mother opened The Milky Way restaurant. In Boro Park, New York City, a Hasidic neighborhood, modern dairy restaurants serve pizza and falafel alongside traditional dairy restaurant fare like donuts, omelets, pancakes, and pirogies. Many of the classic-style dairy restaurants in New York have closed.

== Kosher certification ==
In the modern day, particularly in more observant denominations of Judaism, dairy restaurants are usually certified by a kosher certification agency. Dairy restaurants in the early 20th century generally were not certified kosher, and most Jewish consumers of the time were satisfied with U.S. government approval.

In 2023, all vegetarian and vegan restaurants were deemed kosher regardless of certification in Conservative Judaism, codifying what was already a commonly observed practice by those who observe Jewish dietary laws in that denomination.

== See also ==
- Appetizing store – Type of retail establishment
- Greasy spoon – Small and affordable restaurant
