= Ratner's =

- Interactive map of Ratner's

Restaurant information
- Established: 1905
- Closed: 2002
- Food type: Jewish kosher dairy (milkhik) restaurant
- Location: 138 Delancey Street, on the Lower East Side of Manhattan, New York City, New York
- Coordinates: 40°43′6.56″N 73°59′12.77″W

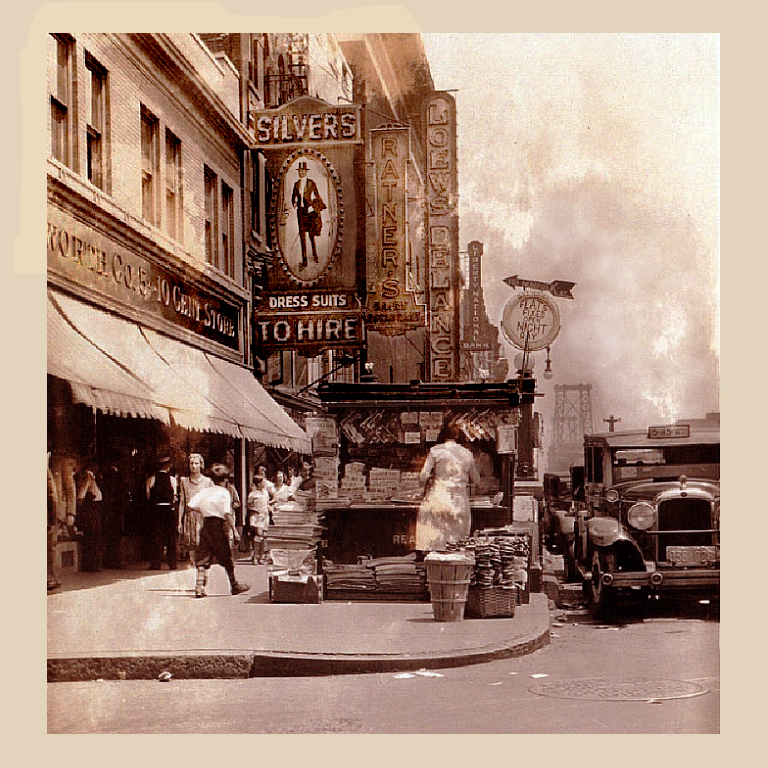
about 1928, sign for Ratner's in background, Lower East Side

Ratner's was a famous kosher Jewish dairy restaurant (milkhik) on the Lower East Side of New York City.

== Ownership ==
Ratner's was founded in 1905 by Jacob Harmatz and his brother-in-law Alex Ratner, who supposedly flipped a coin to decide whose name would be on the sign. Ratner sold his share in the restaurant to Harmatz in 1918, and it remained in the Harmatz family from then on. Jacob's son, Harold Harmatz, took over the business in the mid-1950s, dying a year after the restaurant ceased operation in 2002.

== Menu ==
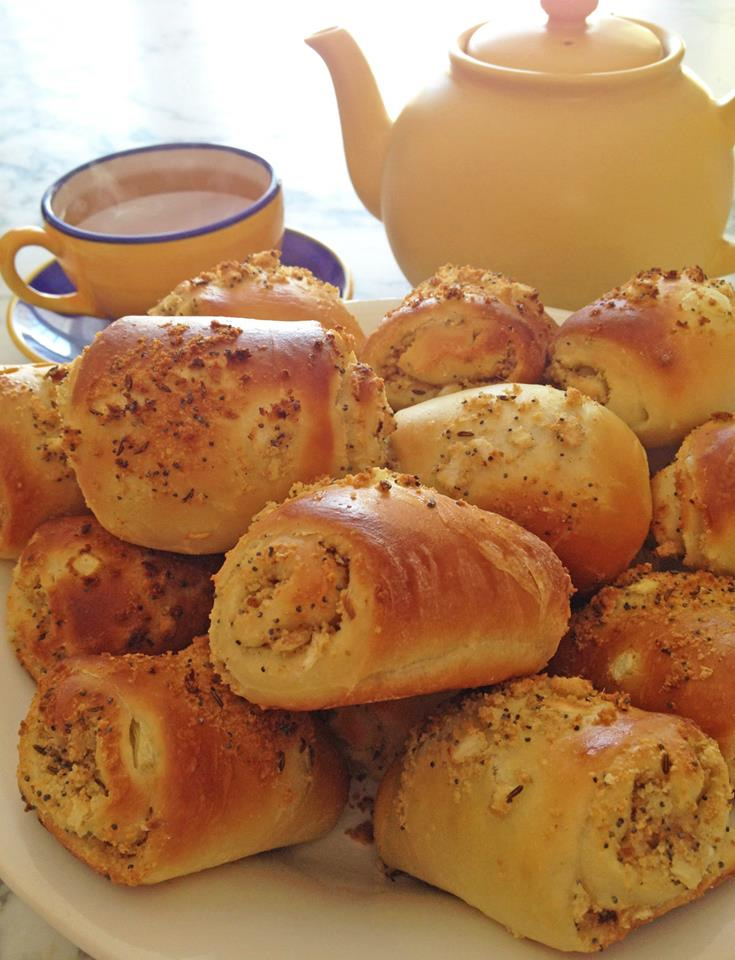
A batch of onion rolls made with the recipe in The World-Famous Ratner's Meatless Cookbook.

Brunch was the main meal at the dairy restaurant, and up to 1,200 people were served daily at the peak of its popularity. Noted menu items included cheese blintzes, potato pancakes (latkes), hot onion rolls, and split-pea soup. Other key items were gefilte fish, poached salmon-in-aspic, kasha varnishkes, and vegetable borsht. According to The World-Famous Ratner's Meatless Cookbook, the winner and undisputed champion at Ratner's was its famous onion rolls, which were featured on every table with every meal. Many recipes survive in print and online.

== Locations ==
The original location was on Pitt Street in Manhattan, but the restaurant moved in 1918 to its better-known location at 138 Delancey Street, where it remained until its closing. There was also a location at 111 Second Avenue, operated by other members of the family. Until 1975, it was open 24 hours a day and therefore part of the late-night city scene popular with Jewish performers, actors, musicians, and gangsters. Entertainers Bill Graham, Al Jolson, Fanny Brice, Marty Allen, Eydie Gormé, Walter Matthau, Elia Kazan, Max Gordon, Groucho Marx, and Alan King were all regular customers, while gangsters Bugsy Siegel and Meyer Lansky frequented the Delancey Street location. According to Abraham Reinstein, the manager of Ratner's for nearly 40 years, Lansky would sit at a table in the rear party room surrounded by bodyguards.

Before the Delancey Street location closed, a back room opened as a bar called "Lansky's Lounge," named after the deceased gangster, who, according to Robert Harmatz, told the owners he was there so often that he deserved to have his own room. The lounge has since closed as well, though another bar continues to exist in the space.

There was also a Ratner's soup cart that operated only on weekdays and served a selection of meatless soups. The cart was located at the corner of 6th Avenue and 46th Street and operated until sometime in the late 1990s.

The Ratner's located at 111 Second Avenue, run by Abraham Harmatz, surpassed the Delancey Street restaurant in popularity for many years, especially during the late 1960s and early 1970s when the part of the Lower East Side that is above Houston Street gradually became known as the East Village—a hip and creative Mecca. Sam Jaffee, the longtime night manager of the Second Avenue Ratner's, worked with Fillmore East impresario Bill Graham to stock the Fillmore's mezzanine food concession with Ratner's baked goods.

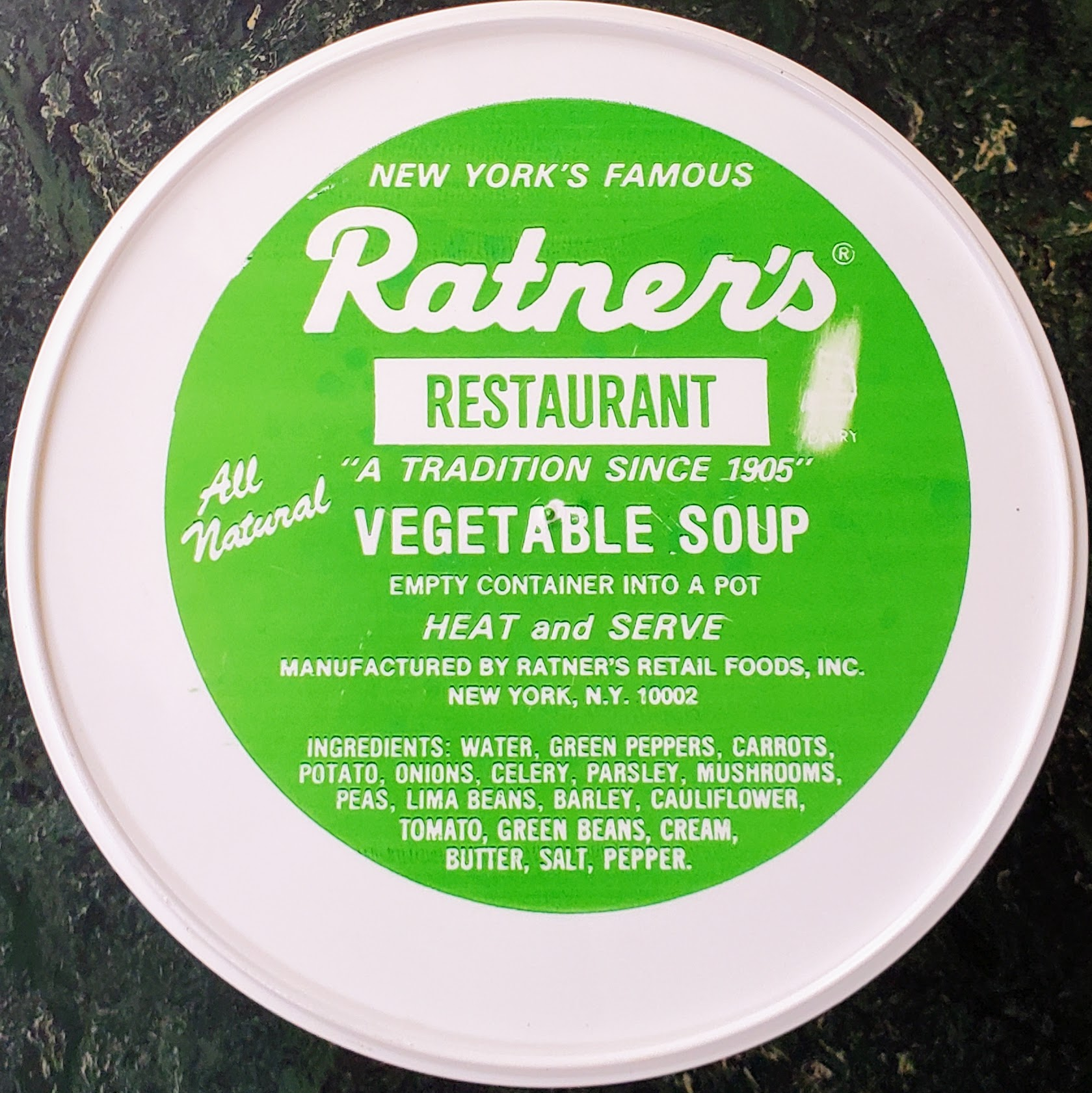
Ratner's Restaurant Vegetable Soup Container Top

== Products ==
A number of products are still manufactured using the Ratner's name by King Kold, which owns the brand, including blintzes, crepes, potato pancakes, veggie pancakes, pierogies, matzo balls, and soups, which are distributed wholesale to supermarkets.

== Legacy ==
In 1975, Jacob Harmatz's daughter, Judith Gethers, and her niece, Elizabeth Lefft, published The World Famous Ratner's Meatless Cookbook. Ms. Gethers authored seven cookbooks and assisted other chefs with their publications.

In 2013, the great-grandson of a Ratner's owner opened a "Jewish-style" with Jewish specialties like matzah ball soup, brisket, and hummus, as well as non-kosher food, such as pork sausages.

== In popular culture ==
An exterior scene of Ratner's is shown in the movie The French Connection, where Angie and Sal Boca have a sunrise breakfast. Ratner's was also featured at the end of the "Christmas Waltz" episode of Mad Men, first broadcast on May 20, 2013.

The exterior of the Second Avenue Ratner's is briefly visible in two 1962 episodes of the TV series Naked City, "The Face of the Enemy" and "A Horse Has a Big Head—Let Him Worry!"

The distinctive red letters and font of the Lower East Side location is briefly visible during the race scene in Ready Player One.

Ratner's was also seen in the 2000 movie, Boiler Room where the main character Seth (Giovanni Ribisi) has a meal with his family. An exterior shot shows the front of the restaurant. The interior scene that immediately follows shows Ratner's famous onion rolls on the family's table.

A scene in Bringing Out the Dead was also filmed there. Theodore Peck, the great grandson of Jacob, spilled whiskey on a camera.

== See also ==
- List of Ashkenazi Jewish restaurants
- List of kosher restaurants
