= Smoked sable =

Smoked sablefish

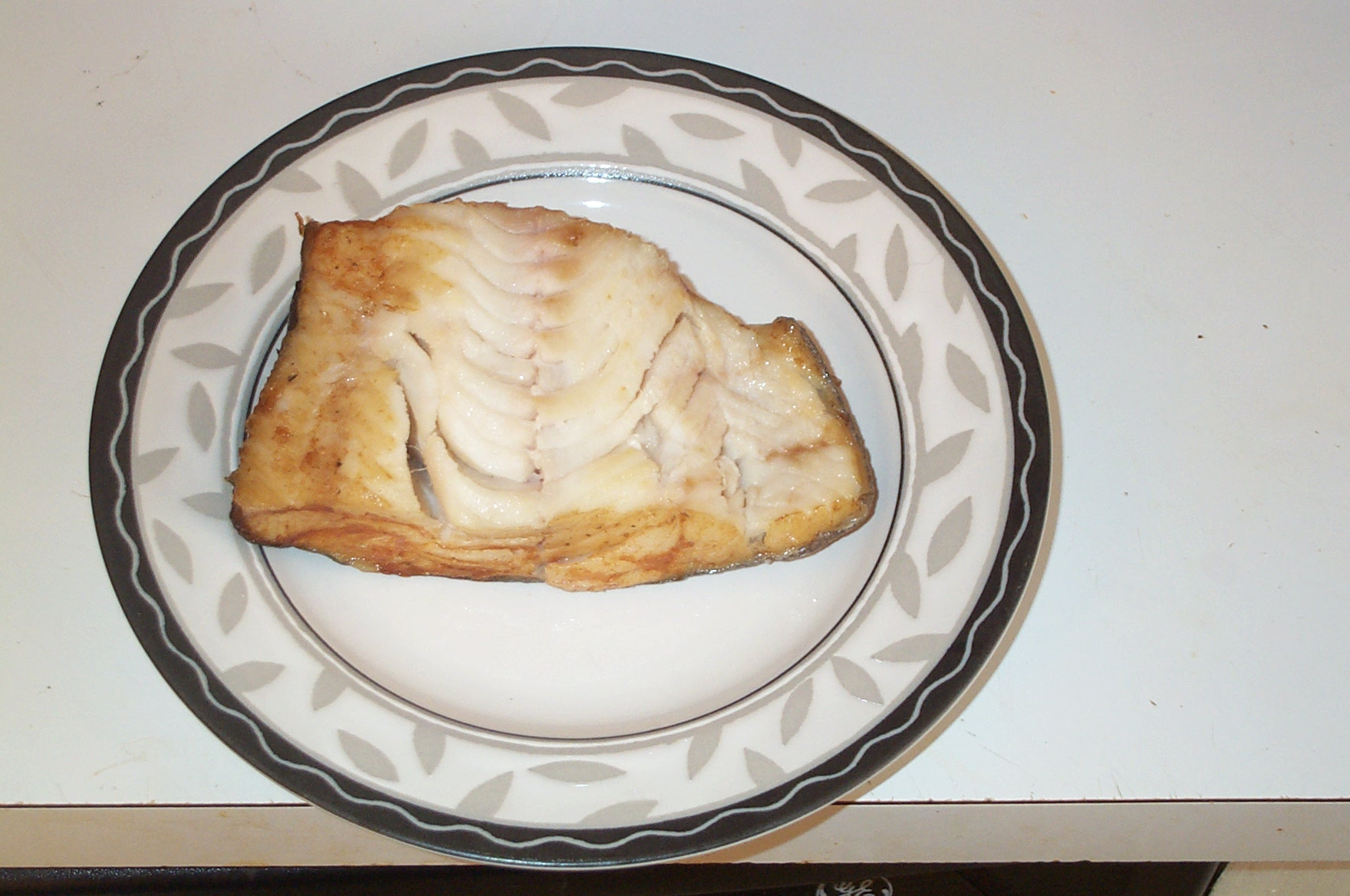
- Course: Breakfast or lunch
- Main ingredients: Smoked sablefish

Smoked sable (also known as sable, sablefish, or smoked black cod), is sablefish that has been smoked. Smoked sable is often prepared with paprika.

Alongside lox, hot-smoked whitefish, mackerel, and trout, Jewish delis often sell sablefish (also sometimes referred to as black cod in its fresh state). Smoked sablefish, often called simply "sable", has long been a staple of New York appetizing stores, one of many smoked fish products usually eaten with bagels for breakfast or lunch in American Jewish cuisine.

While "sable" or "sablefish" is the common name, delis often do not serve sablefish, but rather other types of "black cod" within the Anoplopomatidae family of fish. "Black cod" is a common marketing term for fish within this family.

== See also ==
- List of smoked foods
- Smoked fish
- Smoked salmon
- Whitefish salad
