= Kasuzuke =

Japanese pickles using the lees from sake

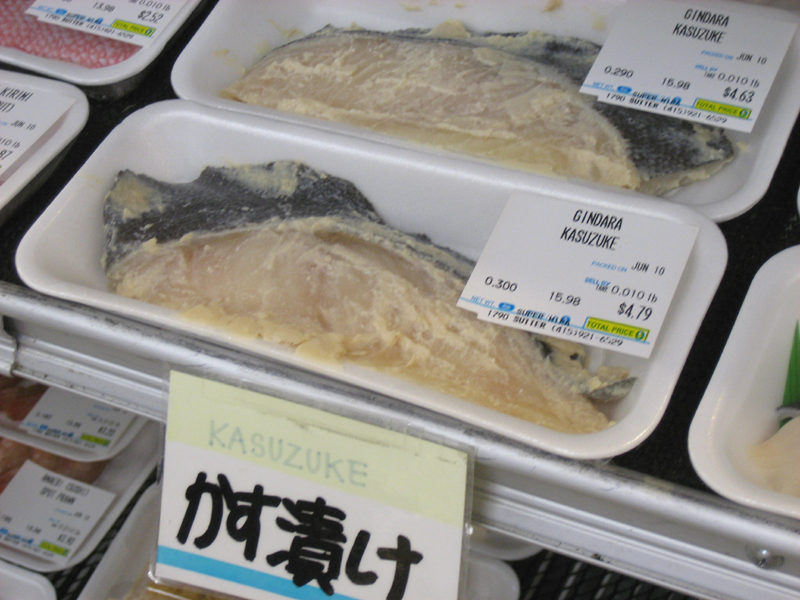
Gindara (sablefish) kasuzuke from a market in San Francisco, California.

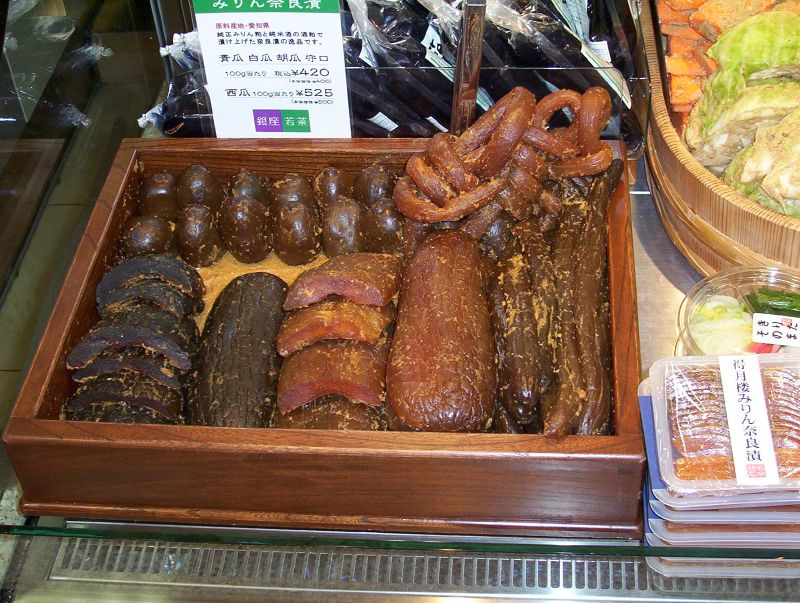
Selection of narazuke

Kasuzuke (粕漬け), also kasu-zuke, is a Japanese dish made by pickling fish or vegetables in the lees (residual yeast and other precipitates) of sake, known as sake kasu.

== History and variations ==
Kasuzuke was made in the Kansai region as early as the Nara period, twelve hundred years ago. Vegetable kasuzuke, known as shiru-kasu-zuke (汁粕漬け) or narazuke (奈良漬) was originally made with white melon, but later with cucumbers, eggplants, uri, and pickling melons. The technique is said to originate from the 7th century, when it was made by Buddhist monks, and used by samurai as imperishable wartime food. During the Edo period of the 17th century, a sake dealer promoted it widely. The dish spread throughout Japan and remains popular today. Carrots, watermelon rind, and ginger may also be pickled in this way.

To make shiru-kasu-zuke vegetables are pickled in a mixture of sake-kasu (in paste or sheet form), mirin, sugar, and salt. Optionally, ginger and citrus may be added. Pickling time ranges from one to three years, with the younger pickles consumed locally in the summer and the older pickles, having turned an amber color, distributed as Narazuke. To make fish kasuzuke, sugar is sometimes omitted, and sake, soy sauce, pepper and/or ginger may be added. Typical fish include cod, salmon, butterfish, and tai snapper. Brining time is one to several days.

Vegetable kasuzuke is eaten as pickles, and is sweet and mild. Fish kasuzuke may be eaten raw or grilled over rice. The flavor is mild but pungent.
