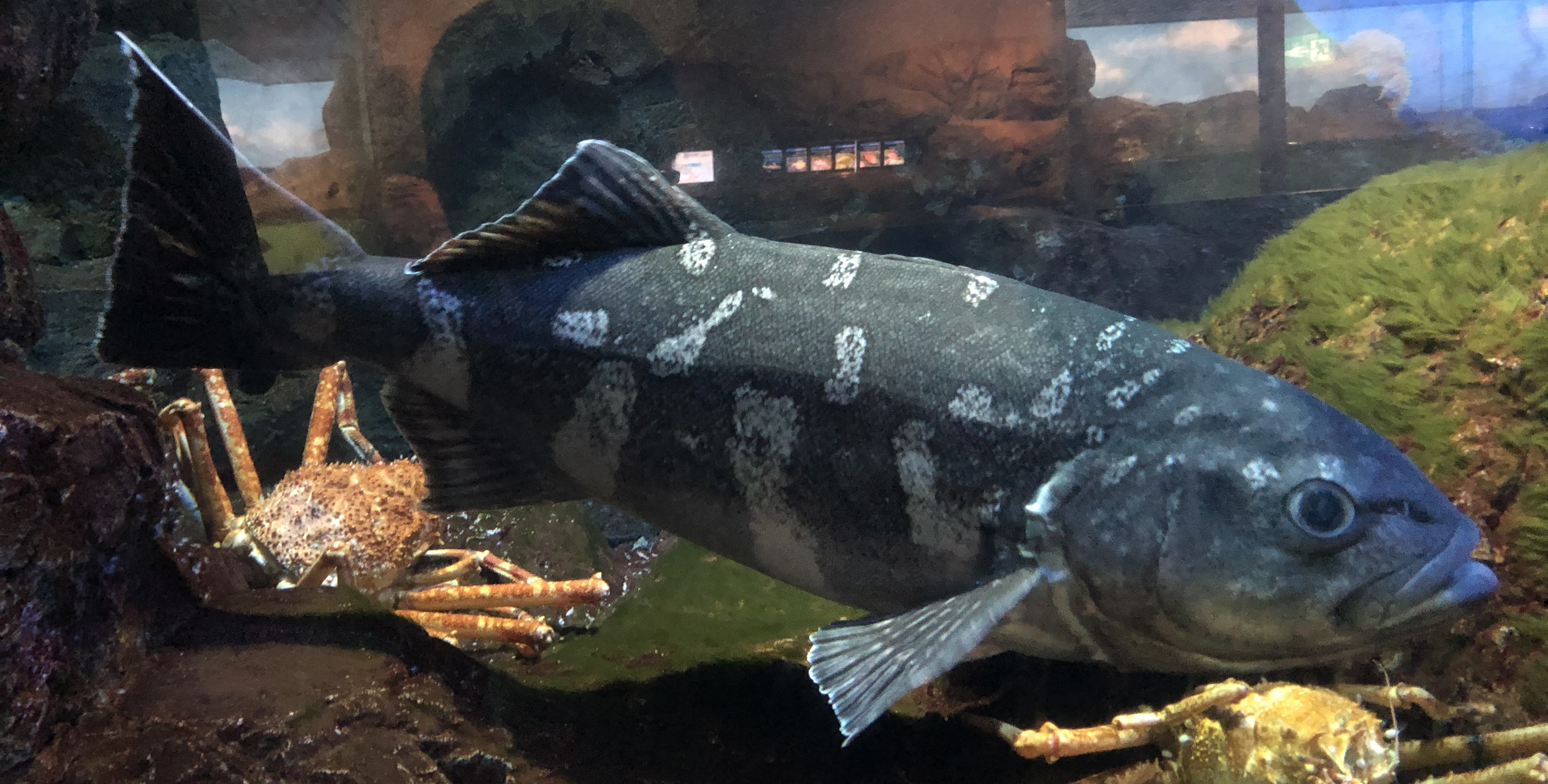

Scientific classification
- Kingdom: Animalia
- Phylum: Chordata
- Class: Actinopterygii
- Division: Teleostei
- Order: Perciformes
- Suborder: Cottoidei
- Family: Anoplopomatidae
- Genus: Erilepis; T. N. Gill, 1894
- Species: E. zonifer

Binomial name
- Erilepis zonifer (Lockington, 1880)

Synonyms
- Myriolepis zonifer Lockington, 1880; Ebisus sagamius Jordan & Snyder, 1901

= Skilfish =

Species of fish

The skilfish (Erilepis zonifer) is a species of ray-finned fish, one of two species belonging to the family Anoplopomatidae and the only species in the genus Erilepis. It is also known as black cod, though they have no relation to cod, family Gadidae, and sable fish or sablefish, which is a name commonly used for other species in the family Anoplopomatidae. Found on deep rocky bottoms in the North Pacific at depths of up to 440 metres, they can reach up to 1.83 metres in length and weigh up to 91 kilograms. Young fish display striking white blotches on their body, however their colour changes to dark grey with maturity, and the bright markings become duller and less visible as they grow, similar to the Tiger shark's stripes.

== Description ==
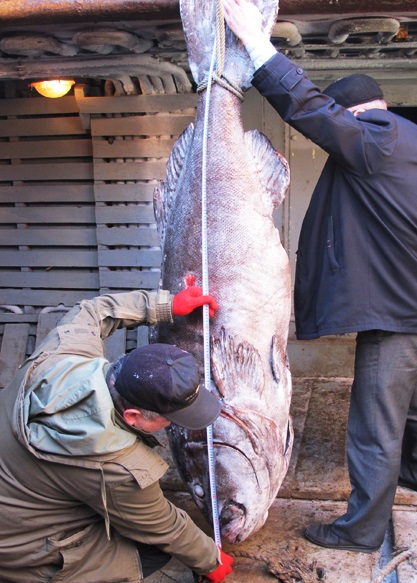
201 centimetre long female, weighing 100 kilograms (220 lb)

Skilfish are large and bulky fish, which bear a resemblance to the wreckfish in the family Polyprionidae, and the groupers or sea bass in the family Serranidae, although skilfish are not related to any of those families. They are very long-lived fish, with some caught specimens being over 90 years old. Skilfish have a dark colored body, with almost black fins, and large, blue eyes above a projectile, cavernous grouper-like mouth. They also have strong caudal fins, which are as tall or taller than the fish's head. Skilfish can grow to a length of 1.83 m, and a weight of 91 kg.

In 2018, during a fishing expedition to the Hawaiian–Emperor seamount chain, the crew of Russian «Vostok-7» longline vessel (JSC «Vostok-1») caught perhaps the largest skilfish in history. The length of the caught specimen was 201 cm, and the record was recorded by TINRO-Center.

== Biology ==
Skilfish in a bento box

Skilfish are the predators of a large number of bony fishes, such as eels, capelin, Pacific cod, pollock, candlefish, herring, mackerel, mullets, cephalopods like squid, octopus, crustaceans such as shrimp, small crabs, and they may also consume jellyfishes and eel leptocephalus. Rockfish may be also prey, as one dissected specimen had a stomach full of rockfish spines.
