= Gondi (food) =

Persian Jewish dish

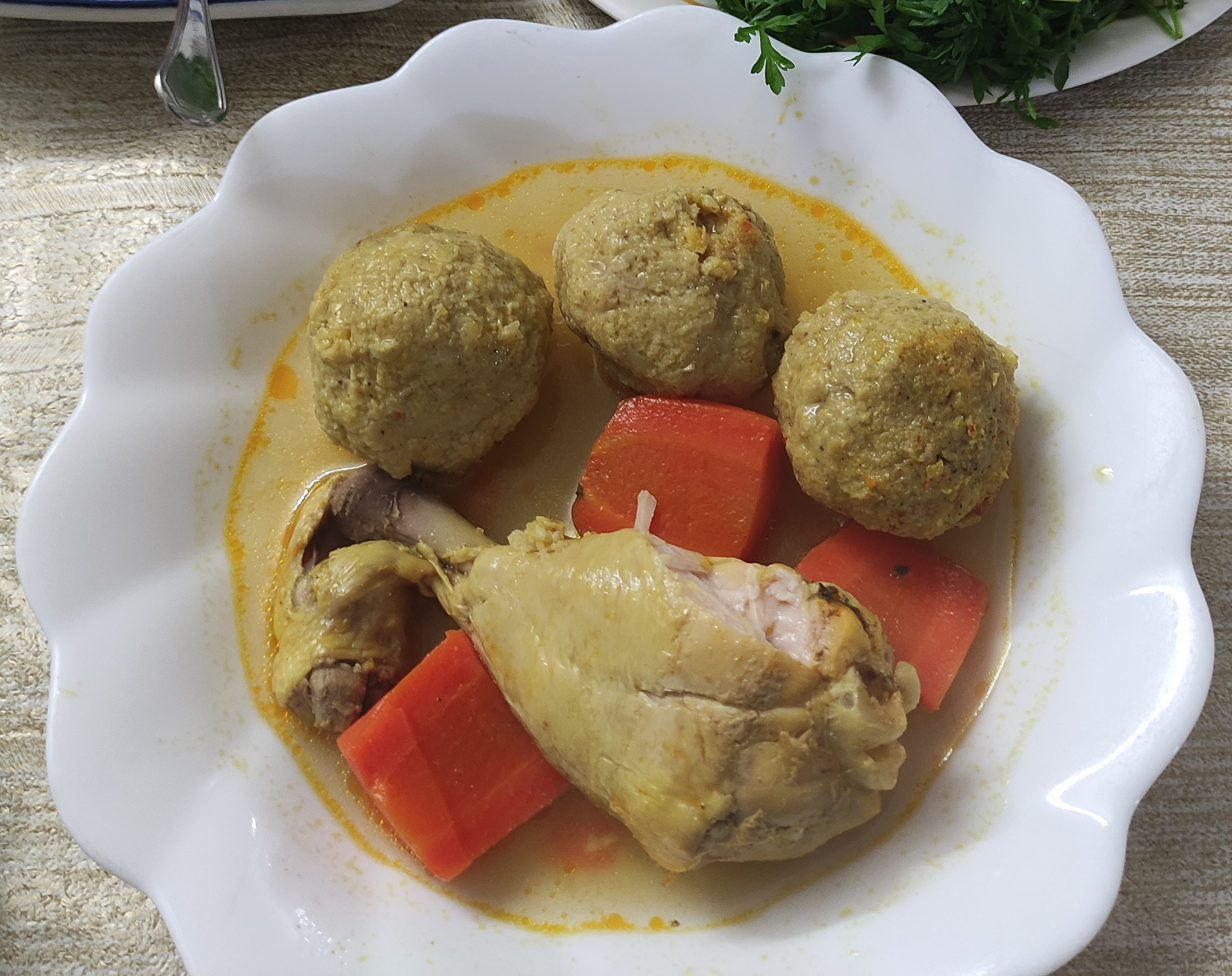
- A plate of gondi with chicken and carrots
- Alternative names: Gundi
- Type: Soup
- Course: Appetizer or side dish
- Place of origin: Iran; Khorasan, Esfahan and Tehran
- Region or state: Persian Jewish; Iran; Israel; United States
- Created by: Persian Jews
- Serving temperature: Hot
- Main ingredients: Chickpea flour, chicken, or turkey, or sometimes ground lamb, grated onions, cardamom, garlic, sometimes turmeric, dried lime

Gondi (Persian: گندی), sometimes spelled gundi, is a Persian Jewish dish of meatballs made from ground lamb, veal or chicken traditionally served on Shabbat. Dried lime is sometimes used as an ingredient. Gondi are served as part of chicken soup on Shabbat and other Jewish holidays, like the similar-looking but unrelated Ashkenazi Jewish matzo balls.

They are also sometimes served as a side dish, or as an appetizer. Accompaniments are Middle Eastern bread and raw greens such as mint, watercress, and basil.

== Origins ==
The origin of gondi is not known with certainty, as the Jewish community residing in various cities in Iran are said to have originated it, but it is commonly said to have first been made in the Jewish community of Tehran. The name gondi is derived from the Middle Persian gwnd, meaning testicle, in reference to its shape (compare New Persian: گند, romanized: gond, lit. 'testicle'). Due to the expense of the meat, it was a specialty for Shabbat. It is one of the dishes credited specifically to Iranian Jews.

== Cultural significance ==
Gondi is primarily a home-cooked dish, traditionally prepared for Friday evening Shabbat dinners within Persian Jewish households. The dish is closely tied to the tradition of Iranian Jewish families gathering at home on the eve of Shabbat, both in Iran and in diaspora communitites. Because the recipe has been passed down through family tradition rather than written documentation, the dish varies considerably from household to household in terms of spices and meat choice. Unlike most foods eaten by Persian Jews, which are shared with their non-Jewish Iranian neighbors, gondi is considered one of the few dishes unique to the Persian Jewish community, not commonly found in non-Jewish Persian cuisine.

== Ingredients ==
Gondi recipes typically include some form of ground meat, chickpea flour (which may be prepared using toasted chickpeas), shredded onions, ground cardamom, and salt.

== See also ==
- List of Jewish cuisine dishes
- List of meatball dishes
