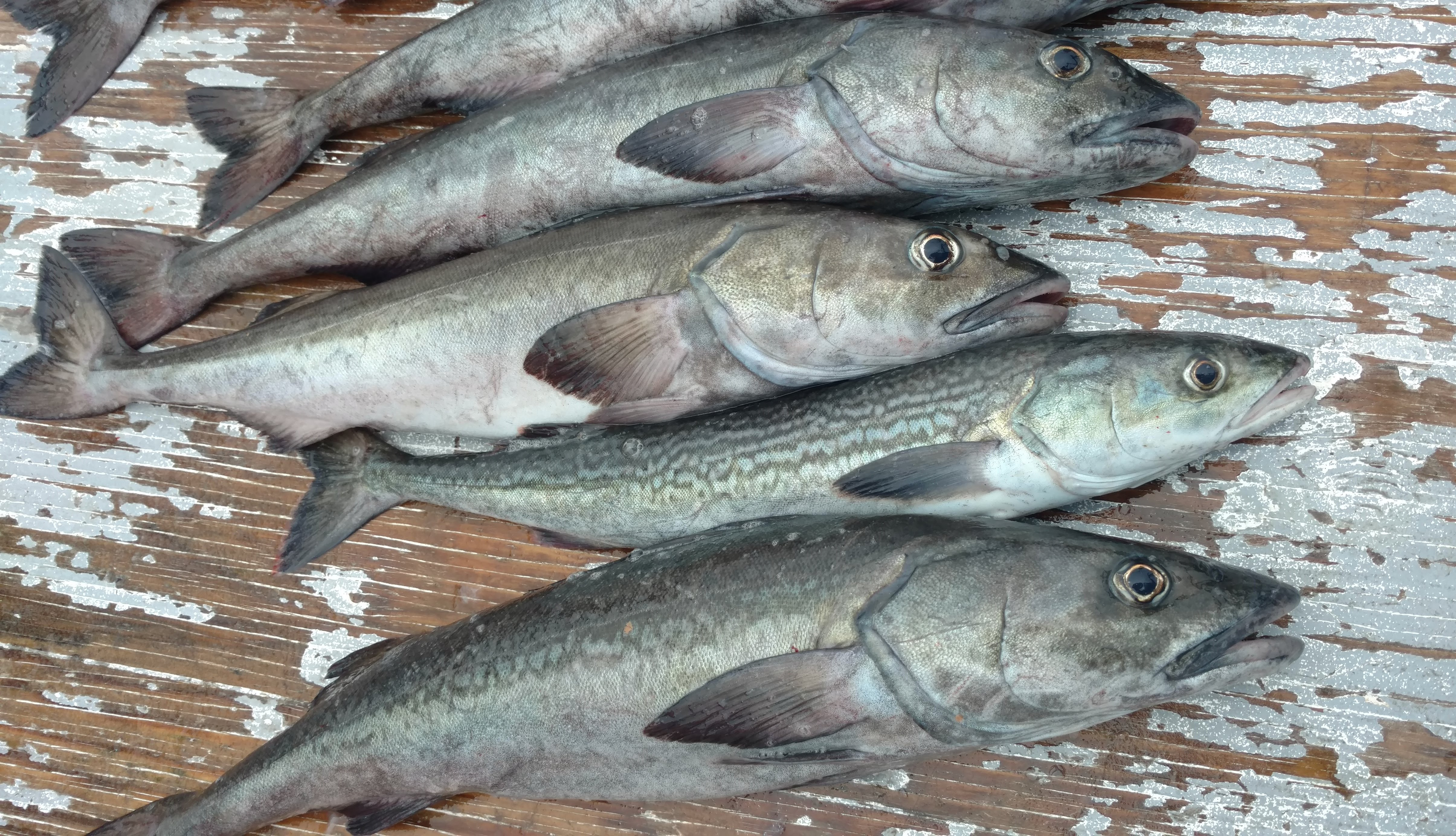
- Small sablefish caught in a bottom trawl survey off the coast of California

Scientific classification
- Kingdom: Animalia
- Phylum: Chordata
- Class: Actinopterygii
- Division: Teleostei
- Order: Perciformes
- Suborder: Cottoidei
- Family: Anoplopomatidae
- Genus: Anoplopoma; Ayres, 1859
- Species: A. fimbria

Binomial name
- Anoplopoma fimbria (Pallas, 1814)

Synonyms
- Gadus fimbria Pallas, 1814; Anoplopoma merlangus Ayres, 1859; Scombrocottus salmoneus Peters, 1872

= Sablefish =

Species of fish

The sablefish (Anoplopoma fimbria) is one of two members of the fish family Anoplopomatidae and the only species in the genus Anoplopoma. In English, common names for it include sable (US), butterfish (US), black cod (US, UK, Canada), blue cod (UK), bluefish (UK), candlefish (UK), coal cod (UK), snowfish (ปลาหิมะ; Thailand), coalfish (Canada), beshow, and skil (Canada), although many of these names also refer to other, unrelated, species. The U.S. Food and Drug Administration accepts only "sablefish" as the acceptable market name in the United States; "black cod" is considered a vernacular (regional) name and should not be used as a statement of identity for this species. The sablefish is found in muddy sea beds in the North Pacific Ocean at depths of 300 to 2,700 m (980 to 8,860 ft) and is commercially important to Japan.

== Description ==
The sablefish is a species of deep-sea fish common to the North Pacific Ocean. Adult sablefish are opportunistic piscivores, preying on Alaskan pollock, eulachon, capelin, herring, sandlance, and Pacific cod, as well as squid, euphausiids, and jellyfish. Sablefish are long-lived, with a maximum recorded age of 94 years although the majority of the commercial catch in many areas is less than 20 years old.

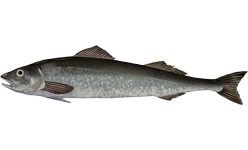
Illustration

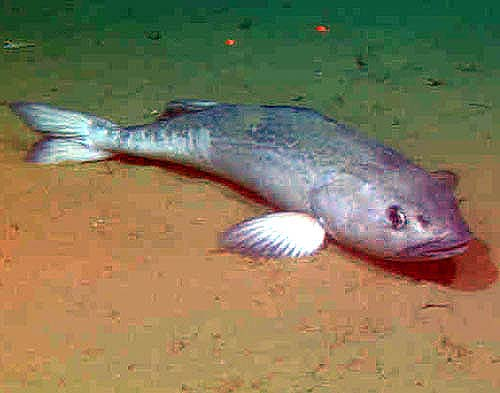
Resting on soft sediment of a 800 m deep canyon floor.

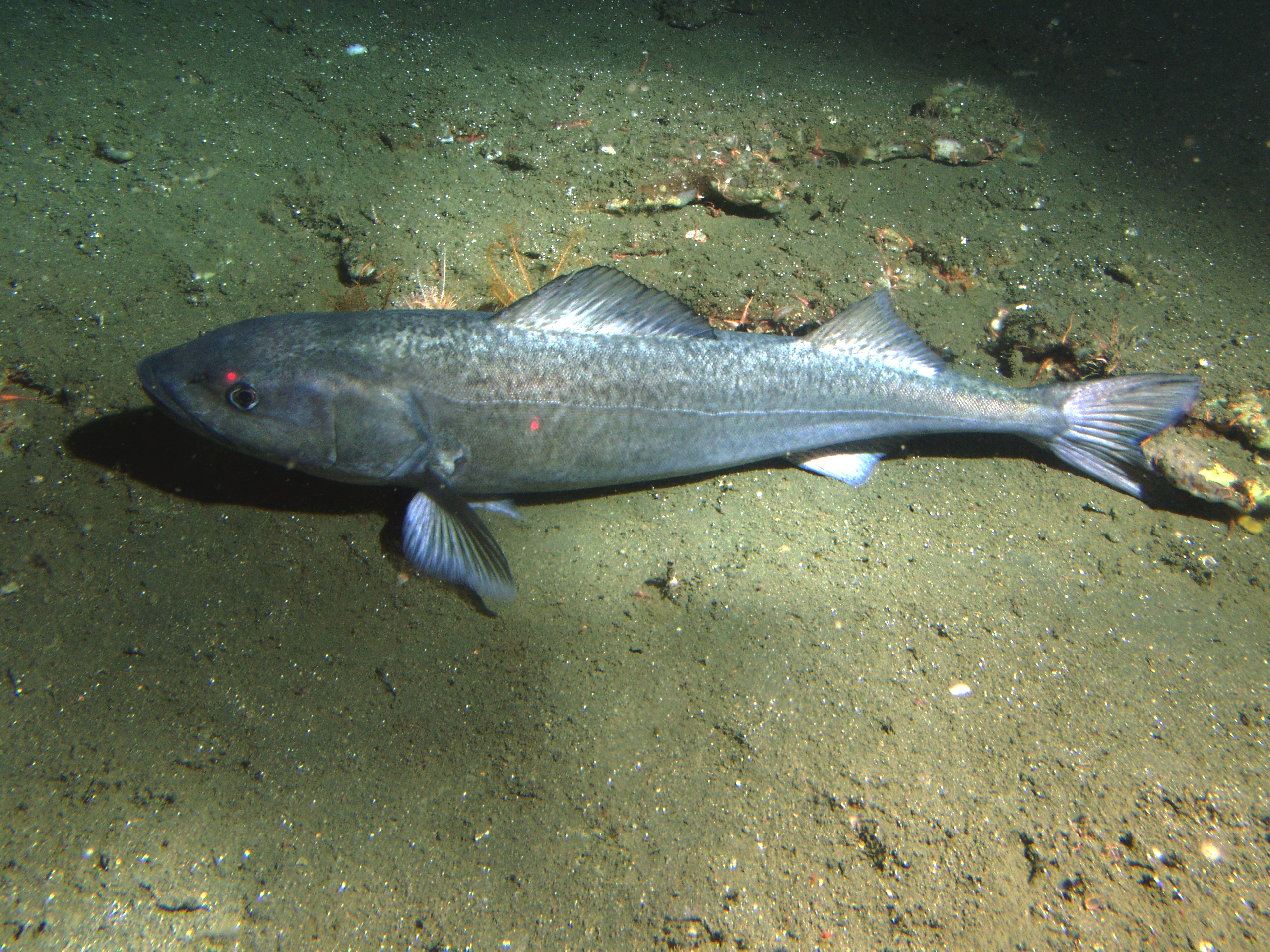
Resting on soft sediment 302 m (991 ft) deep

Sablefish growth varies regionally, with larger maximum sizes in Alaska, where total lengths up to 114 cm (3 ft 9 in) weights up to 25 kg (55 lb) have been recorded. However, average lengths are typically below 70 cm (2 ft 4 in) and 4 kg (8.8 lb).

Tagging studies have indicated that sablefish have been observed to move as much as 2,000 km (1,200 mi) before recapture with one study estimating an average distance between release and recapture of 602 km (374 mi), with an average annual movement of 191 km (119 mi).

== Fisheries ==
Sablefish are typically caught in bottom trawl, longline and pot fisheries. In the Northeast Pacific, sablefish fisheries are managed separately in three areas: Alaska, the Canadian province of British Columbia, and the west coast of the contiguous United States (Washington, Oregon, and California). In all these areas catches peaked in the 1970s and 80s and have been lower since that time due to a combination of reduced populations and management restrictions. The sablefish longline fishery in Alaska has been certified as sustainable by the Marine Stewardship Council as is the US West Coast limited entry groundfish trawl fishery which includes sablefish.

Longline fisheries in Alaska frequently experience predation of sablefish by killer whales and sperm whales which remove the fish from the hooks during the process of retrieving the gear.

Sablefish aquaculture is an area of active research.

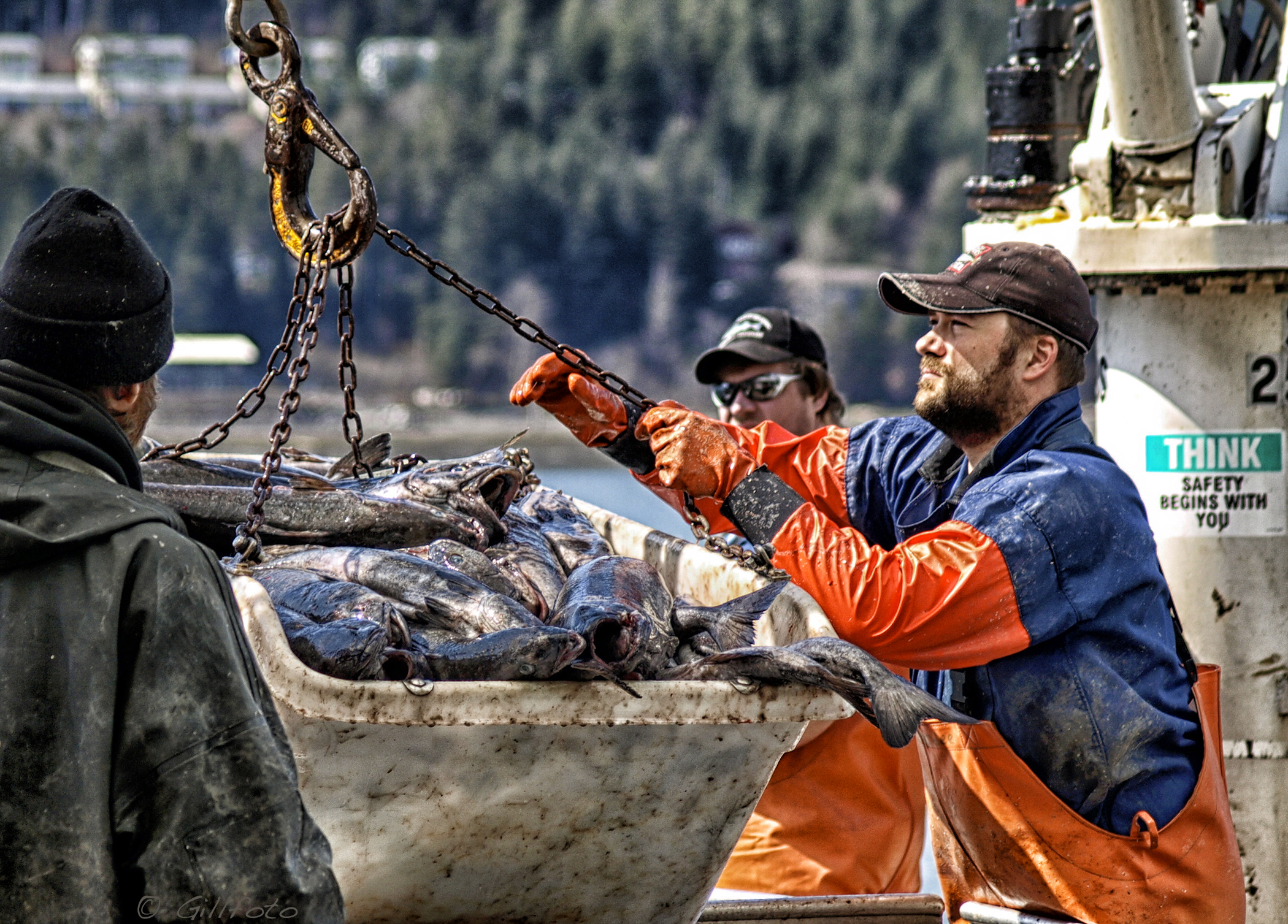
A tote of sablefish being processed in Juneau, Alaska.

Live sablefish at a T&T supermarket.

== Culinary use ==
The white flesh of the sablefish is soft-textured and mildly flavored. It is considered a delicacy in many countries. When cooked, its flaky texture is similar to Patagonian toothfish (Chilean sea bass). The meat has a high fat content and can be prepared in many ways, including grilling, smoking, or frying, or served as sushi. Sablefish flesh is high in long-chain omega-3 fatty acids, EPA, and DHA. It contains about as much as wild salmon.

Smoked sablefish, often called simply "sable", has long been a staple of New York appetizing stores, one of many smoked fish products usually eaten with bagels for breakfast in American Jewish cuisine.

In Japanese cuisine, the black cod (gindara) is often cooked saikyo yaki style, marinated for several days in sweet white miso or sake lees (kasuzuke) then broiled. The Japanese-Peruvian-American chef Nobu Matsuhisa introduced his version of gindara saikyo yaki at his restaurant in Los Angeles, and brought it to his New York restaurant Nobu in 1994, where it is considered his signature dish, under the name "Black Cod with Miso". Kasuzuke sablefish is popular in Seattle thanks to a large Japanese community in that area.

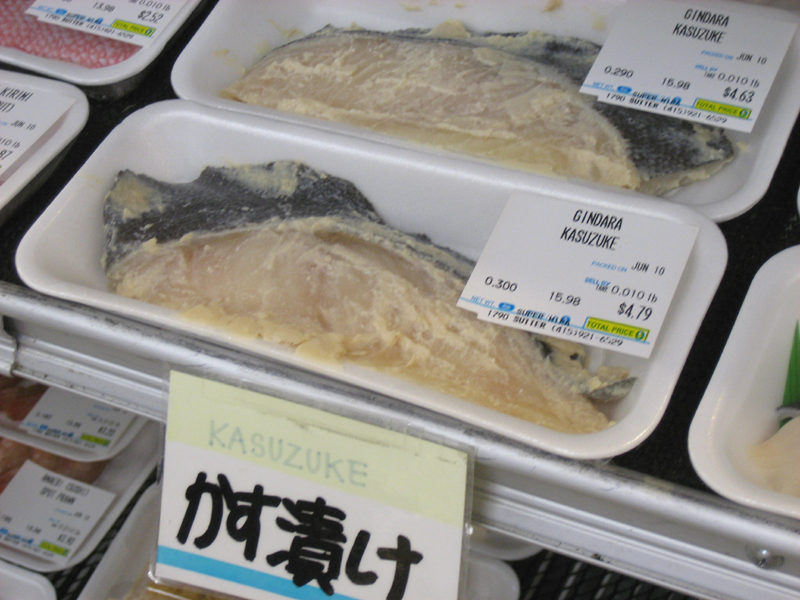
Sablefish (gindara) kasuzuke from a market in San Francisco, California

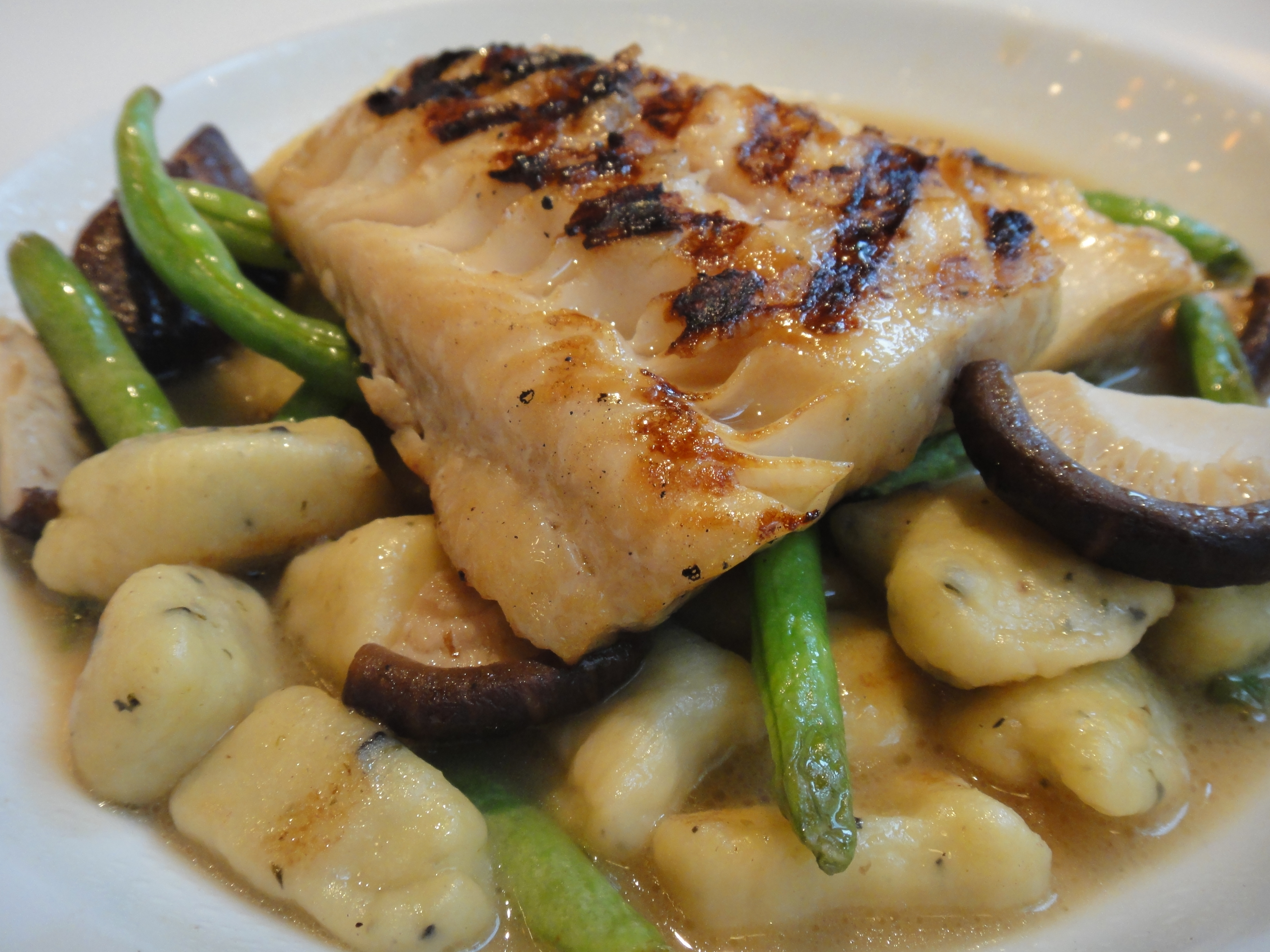
Roasted sablefish and gnocchi, in Calgary, Alberta

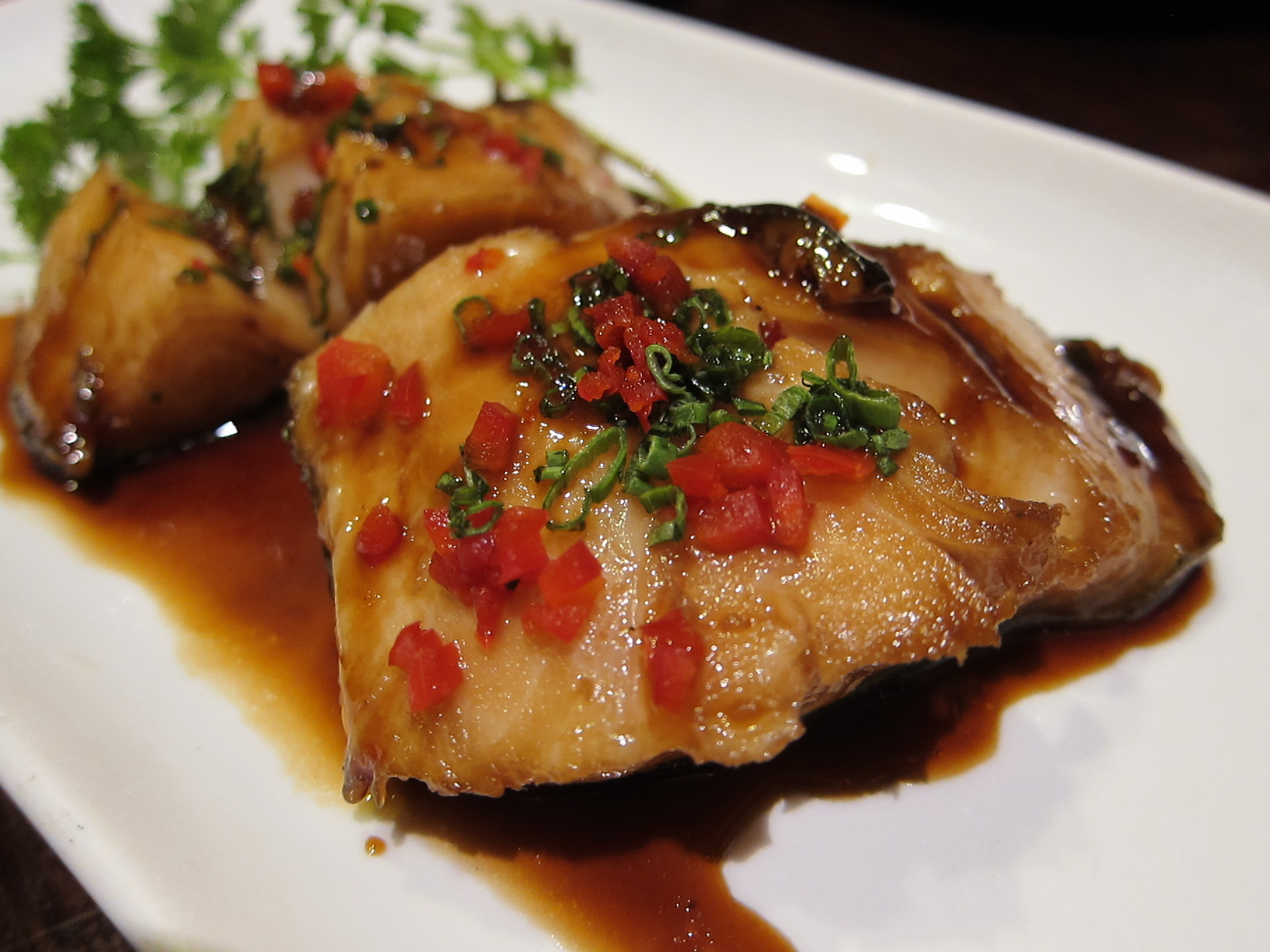
Eundaegu-jorim (simmered black cod), in L.A., California

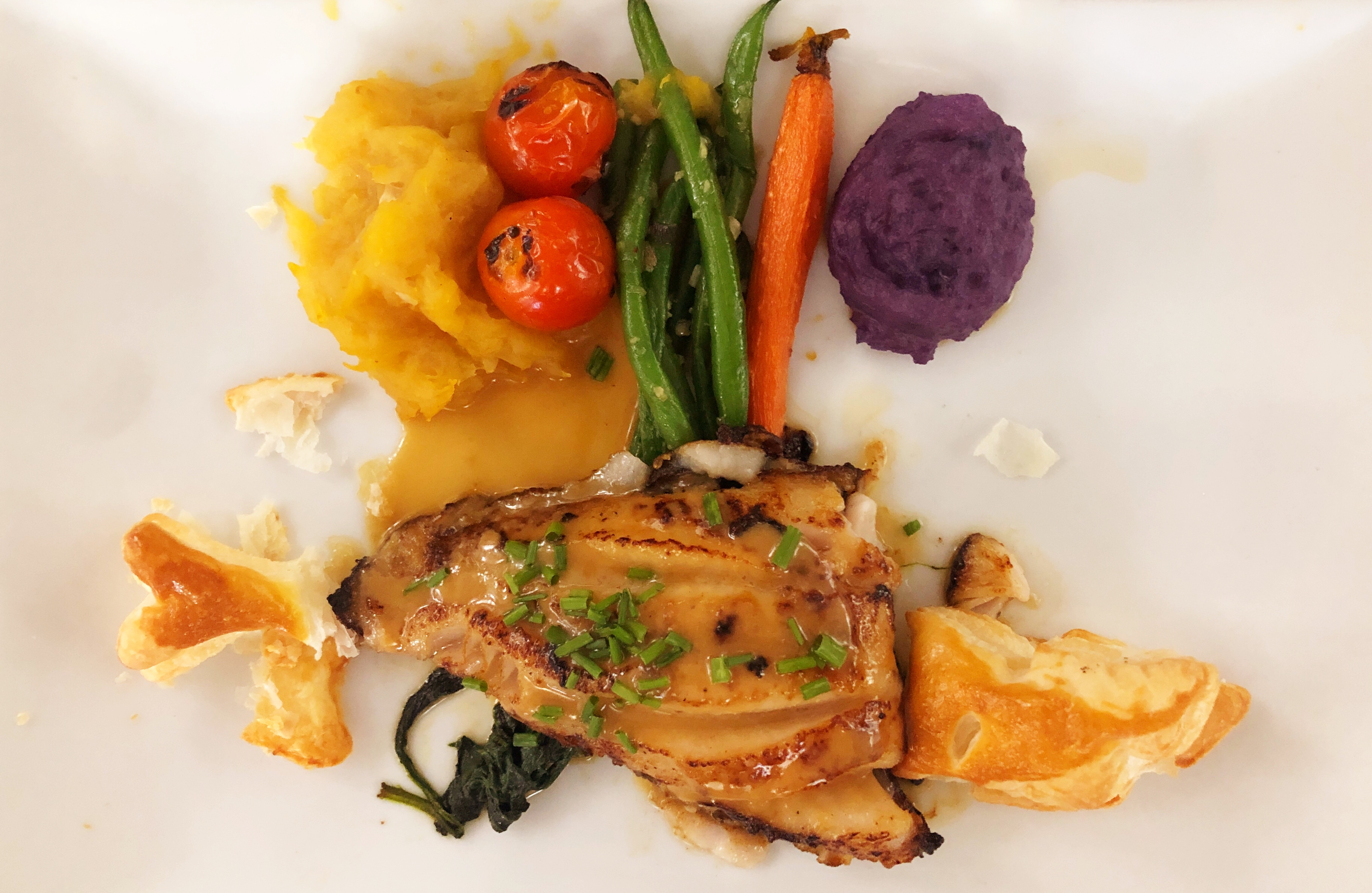
Miso black cod at a restaurant in Paso Robles, California

== Nutrition ==
Nutritional information for sablefish is as follows.

Serving Size	100 g
Food Energy	660 kJ (158 kcal)
Protein	14.4 g
Energy from protein: 260 kJ (61 kcal) As a percentage: 39%	
Fat	10.7 g
Energy from fat: 400 kJ (96 kcal) As a percentage: 61%	
Carbohydrate	0.0 g
Energy from carbohydrate: 0 kJ (0 kcal) As a percentage: 0.0%	
Cholesterol	43.3 mg
Sodium	43.6 mg

Serving Size	per 100 g	per 420 kJ (100 kcal)
Omega 3 (EPA+DHA)	1792 mg	1137 mg
Vitamin B3	1.6 mg	1.0 mg
Vitamin B6	0.2 mg	0.1 mg
Vitamin B12	2.4 μg	1.5 μg
Vitamin D	132 IU	84 IU
Vitamin E	3 mg	1.9 mg
Calcium	4.4 mg	2.8 mg
Magnesium	18.9 mg	12.0 mg
Phosphorus	194 mg	123 mg
Potassium	363 mg	230 mg
Selenium	30 μg	19 μg

=== Mercury content ===
Studies of accumulated mercury levels find average mercury concentrations from 0.1 ppm, 0.2 ppm, and up to 0.4 ppm. The US Food and Drug Administration puts sablefish in the "Good Choices" category in their guide for pregnant women and parents, and recommends one 4-ounce serving (uncooked) a week for an adult, less for children. The Alaska epidemiology section considers Alaska sablefish to be "low in mercury" and advises no restrictions on sablefish consumption by all populations.
