= Onion roll =

Bread flavored with dry onions

Onion rolls
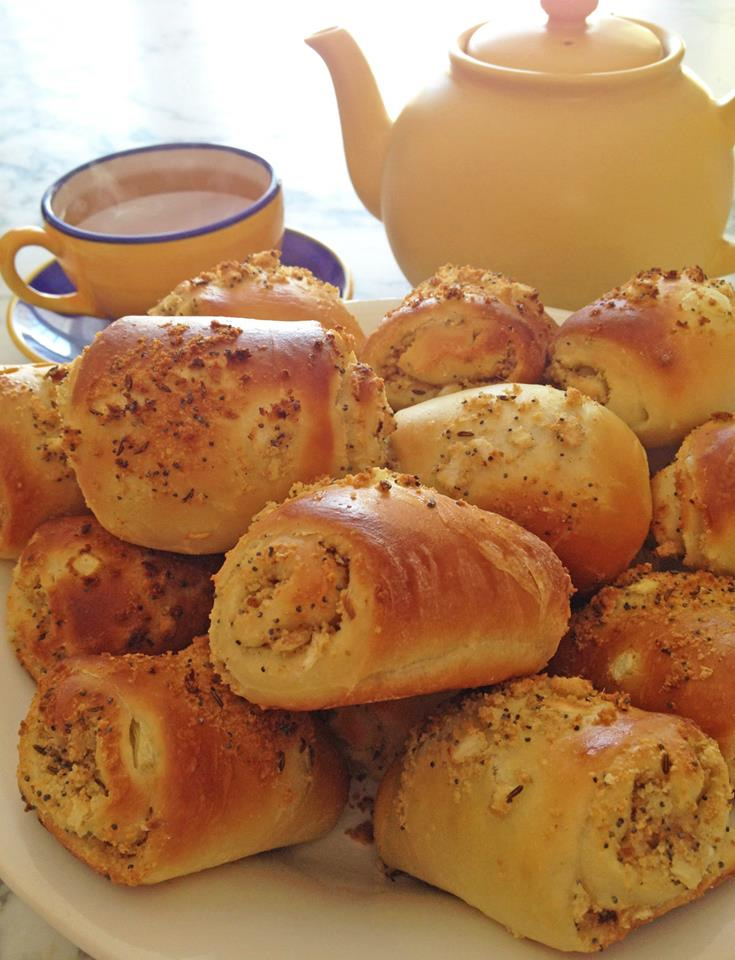
- Onion rolls made with the recipe found in "The World-Famous Ratner's Meatless Cookbook".
- Alternative names: Jewish onion rolls, Ratner's onion rolls, Miami onion rolls
- Type: Bread
- Place of origin: Central-Eastern Europe
- Created by: Ashkenazi Jews
- Main ingredients: Flour, eggs, butter, water, oil, sugar, onion, poppy seeds

Onion rolls are a roll of Ashkenazi Jewish origin similar to a bun, that is made of a soft, slightly sweet dough similar to challah, containing dried onions throughout which create its signature flavor. It is often topped with dried onions, and occasionally poppy seeds.

== Overview ==
Onion rolls are a small roll, originating in the Jewish communities of Eastern Europe several hundred years ago. The rolls contain flour, water, eggs, oil, salt, yeast, sugar, dried onions, and often poppy seeds. Today they are most typically used for sandwiches by those in the Jewish community, although they are also used as a dinner roll and can be commonly found at Jewish delis and bakeries across North America and Israel.

== History ==
=== Early history ===
Onion rolls originated in the Ashkenazi Jewish community of Eastern Europe several hundred years ago, and were brought to the Americas by Jewish refugees fleeing Eastern Europe at the turn of the 20th century (late 1800s). These refugees brought their traditional Jewish foods with them to their new homes in America, especially in New York City, which became a center of Jewish culture and was where the onion roll became most notable.

=== 20th century ===
Onion rolls could be found at Jewish bakeries, restaurants, delicatessens, and markets around the United States and other places with a significant Jewish population. However most notably, the kosher dairy restaurant Ratner's opened in New York City’s Lower East Side neighborhood in 1908, and began serving its famous onion rolls soon after. These onion rolls became famous both within the Jewish community and among other New Yorkers as well. The restaurant opened several more locations but eventually, they all closed in 2002. At the restaurant’s peak up to 3,000 onion rolls were baked and served every day.

=== 2002–present ===
According to Jewish American cookbook author and baker Stanley Ginsburg, “It’s almost impossible to find a decent onion roll.”, since the closing of Ratner’s in 2002 which prompted him to help write a cookbook, ”Inside the Jewish Bakery”, offering his version of an onion roll, and other classic Jewish breads and other baked goods. Onion rolls have since been featured in other Jewish baking cookbooks as well. The family that formerly owned Ratner's later published a book with a recipe for their original onion rolls after the restaurant's closing.

Today onion rolls are most commonly found in supermarkets across the Northeastern United States, as well as the Los Angeles and Miami areas, due to their large Jewish populations. Onion rolls are sold by a variety of brands including Kasanoff’s, Miami Onion Roll Company, Ratner’s, Zomick’s, and others in stores across the country. Bakeries in Detroit have created a “New Yorker Onion Roll”, which is made in the style of Ratner’s.

Onion rolls are also still found in Jewish bakeries and dairy restaurants in the United States, as well as Israel.

== In popular culture ==
Onions rolls are a popular bread in Jewish culture, particularly the American Jewish culture of New York City, where they are commonly served at Jewish bakeries, delis, kosher markets and restaurants. They have also been featured in popular culture.

Onions rolls were the most famous food served at the now-closed Ratner's restaurant in New York’s Lower East Side, a kosher Jewish dairy restaurant. Ratner's was an iconic Jewish restaurant in the city for many decades, and its onion rolls were very popular among its clientele, some of whom still remember them and attempt to recreate them to this day.

According to the restaurant's cookbook, the winner and undisputed champion at Ratner's was its famous onion rolls which were featured on every table with every meal served at the restaurant. More than 1500 onion rolls were baked daily, 3000 on Sundays.

Onion rolls were featured in the 2000 movie, Boiler Room where the main character Seth, (Giovanni Ribisi) has a meal with his family. An exterior shot shows the front of the restaurant. The interior scene that immediately follows shows Ratner's famous onion rolls on the family's table.

== See also ==
- Challah
- List of Jewish cuisine dishes
- Ratner's
