= Mafrum =

Libyan Jewish stuffed vegetable dish

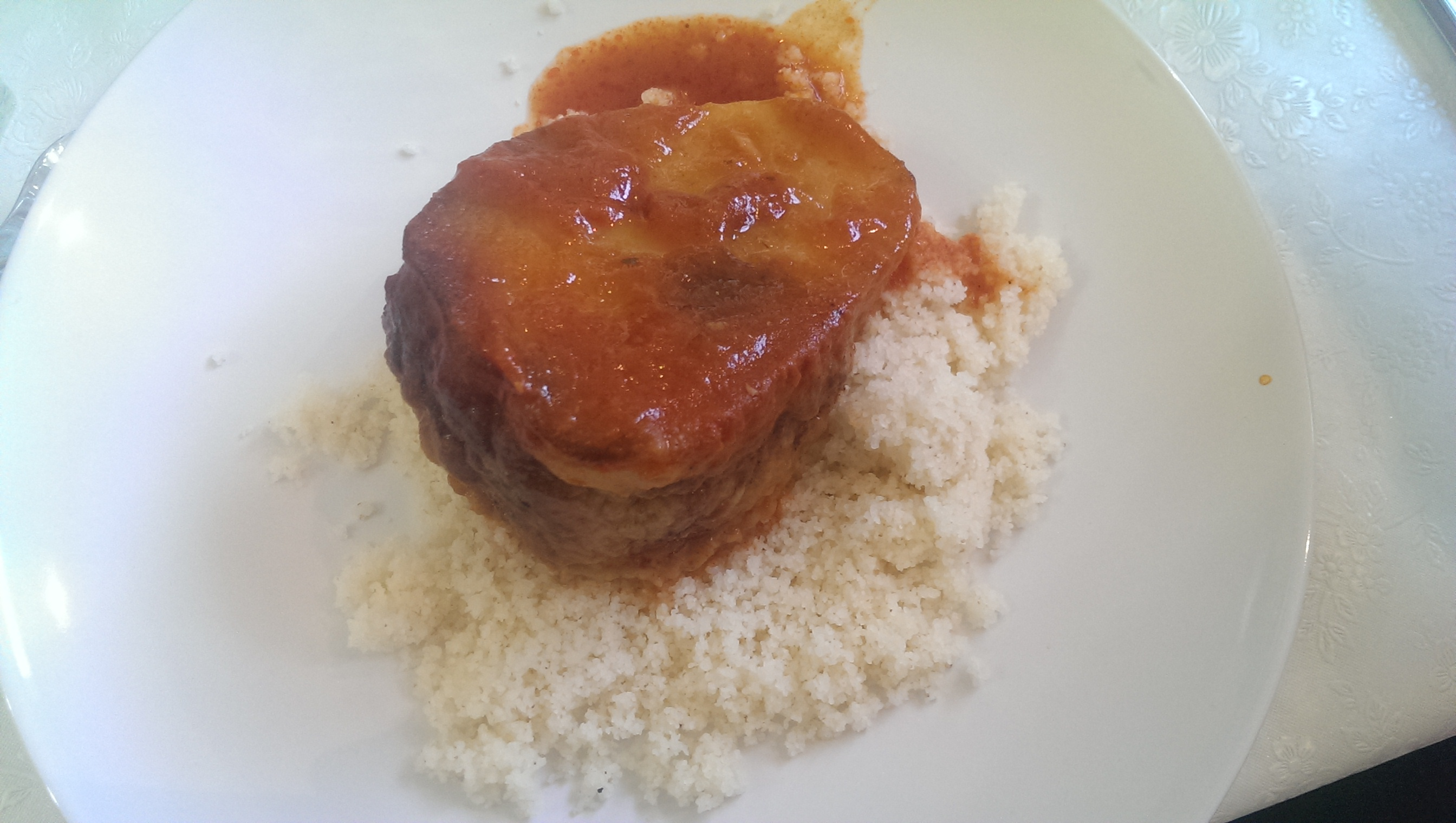
- Potato-based mafrum served on couscous
- Type: Stuffed vegetable
- Place of origin: Libya
- Associated cuisine: Libyan Jewish cuisine, Jewish cuisine, Israeli cuisine
- Main ingredients: Potato, eggplant, zucchini, or bell pepper; Ground meat; Spices

Mafrum, also spelled "mafroom" (Arabic: مفروم), is a Libyan Jewish stuffed vegetable dish. Root vegetables are hollowed out and filled with a blend of ground meat and spices. These stuffed vegetables are then fried and simmered in a tomato-based sauce. While potatoes are the vegetable typically used, certain recipes employ eggplants, zucchinis, onions and/or bell peppers.

Mafrum is traditionally served with couscous and eaten during Shabbat and Jewish holidays. It spread beyond Libya due to the mass Jewish exodus from the country in the 1950s and 60s. In Italy, mafrum was introduced to the Jewish community of Rome after the evacuation of Libyan Jews following the Six-Day War in 1967. In Israel, it became a popular dish, with interpretations by Jews from Tunisia, Morocco, and Egypt.
