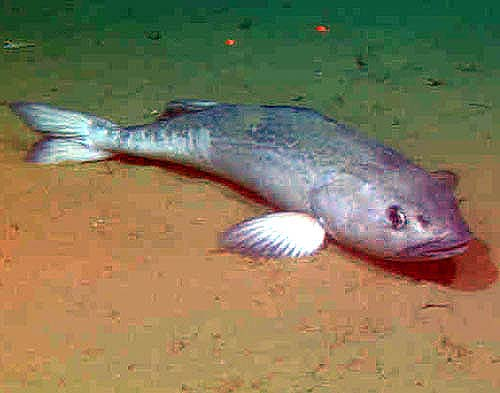
- Sablefish, Anoplopoma fimbria

Scientific classification
- Kingdom: Animalia
- Phylum: Chordata
- Class: Actinopterygii
- Order: Perciformes
- Suborder: Cottoidei
- Superfamily: Anoplopomatoidea; Quast, 1965
- Family: Anoplopomatidae; D. S. Jordan & C. H. Gilbert, 1883

Genera
- see text

= Anoplopomatidae =

Family of ray-finned fishes

Anoplopomatidae, the sablefishes, are a small family of ray-finned fishes classified within the order Perciformes. These fishes are found in the North Pacific Ocean.

== Taxonomy ==
Anoplopomatidae was first proposed as a family in 1883 by the American ichthyologists David Starr Jordan and Charles Henry Gilbert. In 1965 Jay C. Quast proposed that the sablefishes were so different from other members of the Cottoidei that they should be classified within their own superfamily, the Anoplopomatoidea. The 5th edition of Fishes of the World classifies this superfamily within the suborder Cottoidei of the order Scorpaeniformes. However, other authorities place it within the infraorder Anoplopomatales which is close to the infraorder Zoarcales at the base of the Cottoidei within the order Perciformes.

== Genera ==
Anoplopomatidae contains two monospecific genera:

- Anoplopoma Ayres, 1859
- Erilepis Gill, 1894

== Characteristics ==
Anoplopomatidae fishes have heads which lack spines, ridges, or cirri. They have two dorsal fins, the second dorsal fin having between 16 and 21 soft rays. The anal fin has three weak spines and between 11 and 19 soft rays. Their pelvic fins have a single spine and 5 soft rays, There are two well-developed nostrils on either side of the snout. The gill membranes are joined to isthmus. There is a single lateral line. Of the two species in the family the sablefish (Anoplopoma fimbria) is the smaller attaining a maximum total length of 120 cm (47 in) while the skilfish (Erilepis zonifer) reaches 183 cm (72 in).

== Distribution ==
Anoplopomatidae species are both distributed in the North Pacific Ocean from Japan to the Bering Sea and along the western coast of North America especially California,
