= Shkedei marak =

Israeli crouton

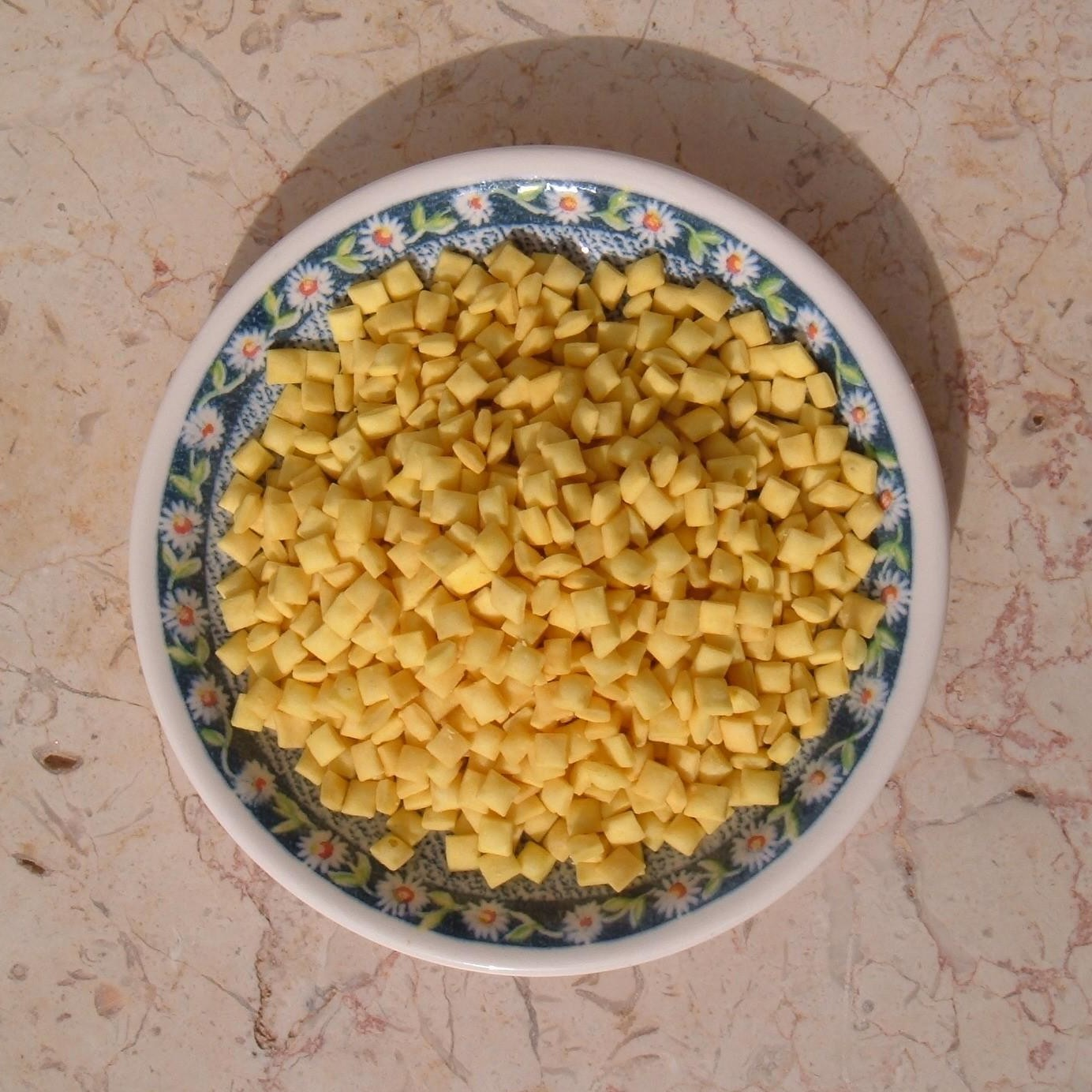
- Shkedei marak
- Alternative names: Soup mandel
- Place of origin: Israel
- Main ingredients: Flour, palm oil

Shkedei marak (Hebrew: שקדי מרק, lit. 'soup almonds'), known as mandlakh (Yiddish: מאַנדלאַך or מאַנדלעך, lit. 'little almonds') in Yiddish, or as "soup mandels" or "soup nuts" in the United States, is an Israeli food product consisting of crisp mini crouton used as a soup accompaniment. Shkedei marak are small yellow squares made from flour and palm oil. As a parve product, they can be used in either meat or cream soups. Despite the name, they contain no almonds.

== Etymology ==
The word mandlach is the plural diminutive of mandel, which means "almond" in German and Yiddish. The word "shkedei" is the plural form of "shaked", which means "almond" in Hebrew, and "marak" is the Hebrew word for soup.

== History ==
Although today shkedei marak are manufactured, they are based on the homemade crispy-fried squares of dough known as mandlach traditionally served with chicken soup by Ashkenazi Jews.

== Marketing ==
For many years Osem was the exclusive manufacturer of shkedei marak in Israel, but today the product is also marketed by other food companies, such as Vita and Knorr. Davidovich Bakery & Sons located near Haifa also produces and packages soup almonds under a variety of brand names. Over the years, food companies have experimented with different shapes for shkedei marak, including stars, rings, and little fish. In addition to their use in soups, shkedei marak are eaten plain as a snack food.

== See also ==
- Israeli cuisine
- Oyster cracker
- Saltine
