= Ravikos =

Sephardic spinach dish

Ravikos (Italian: Testine di spinaci) is a Turkish Jewish dish of slow-braised spinach stems, also part of the cuisine of Italian Jews. The stems are cooked in broth or water, with lemon juice or vinegar, and olive oil. Some recipes add chopped tomatoes and rice. It is a customary dish for Thursday dinners when meals are usually kept light in advance of the Shabbat meal. The spinach leaves are usually added to the frittata-like egg and vegetable dishes that are a staple of the traditional Sephardic brunch called desayuno. In Italian they are called testine di spinaci, or according to an old Venetian recipe, gambetti de spinasse (lit. "little spinach legs").
