= P'tcha =

Ashkenazi Jewish aspic

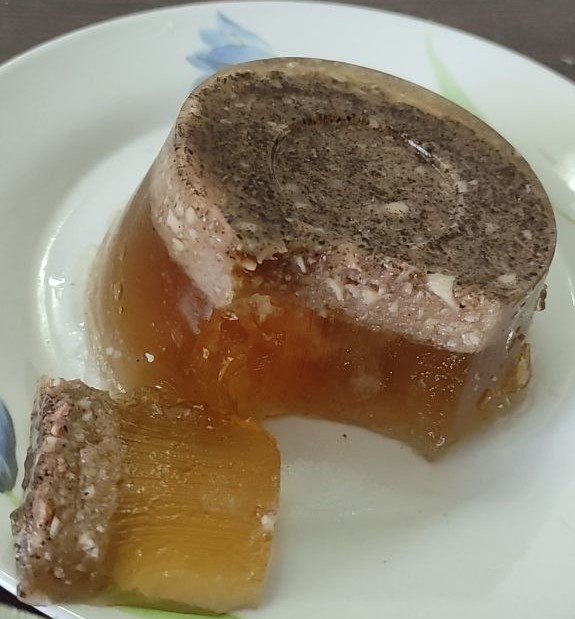
Foot jelly from Bnei Brak

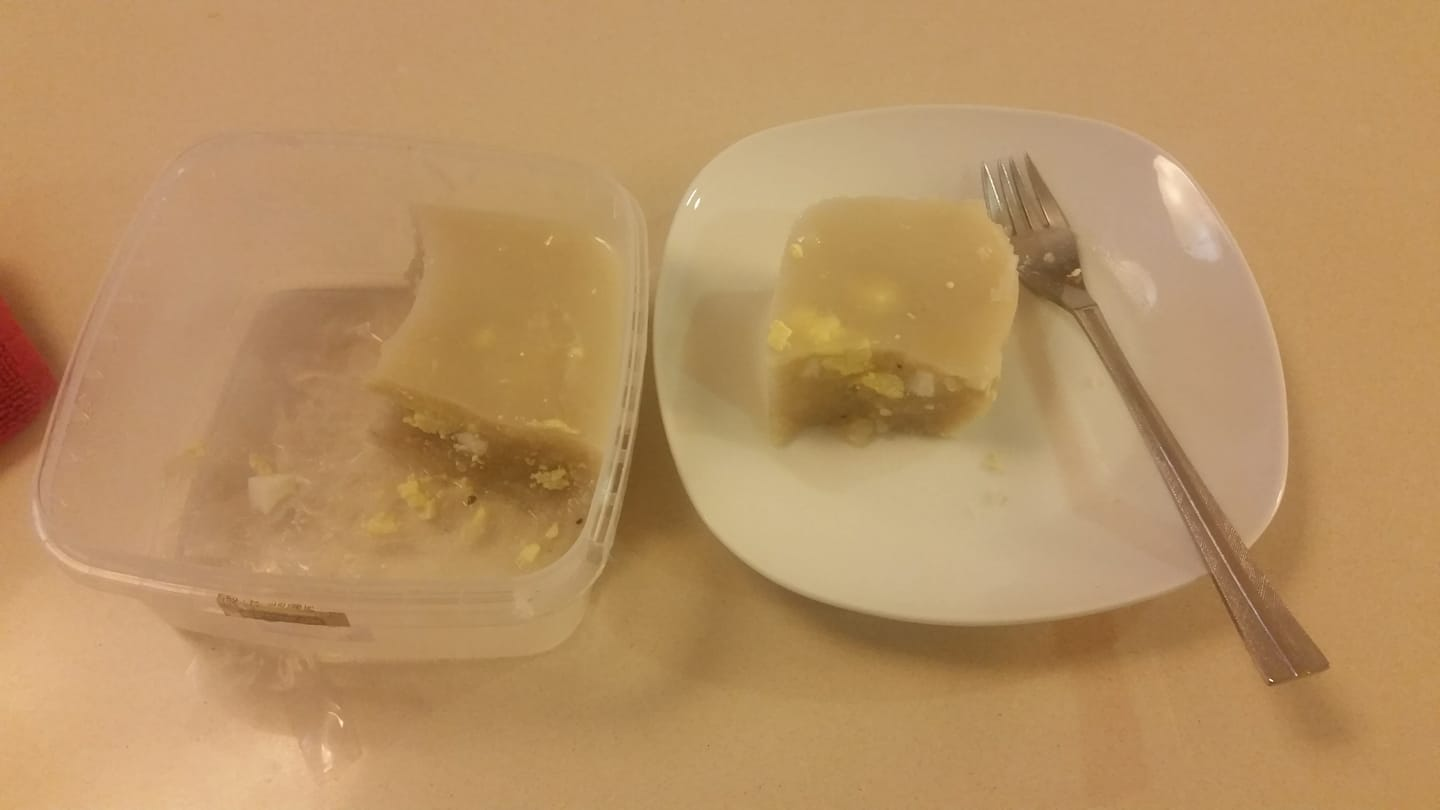

P'tcha, fisnoga or galareta (also known as "calves' foot jelly") is a traditional Ashkenazi Jewish dish. It is a kind of aspic prepared from calves' feet. The name appears to derive from the Turkish words paça çorbası, or "foot soup".

== History ==
In Eastern Europe, Jews served p'tcha with chopped eggs on Sabbath. In the early 20th century, Jewish immigrants in the United States continued to prepare the dish, and it was often served as an appetizer at Jewish weddings. The Encyclopedia of Jewish Food describes it as a delicacy made from one of the least expensive parts of the animal.

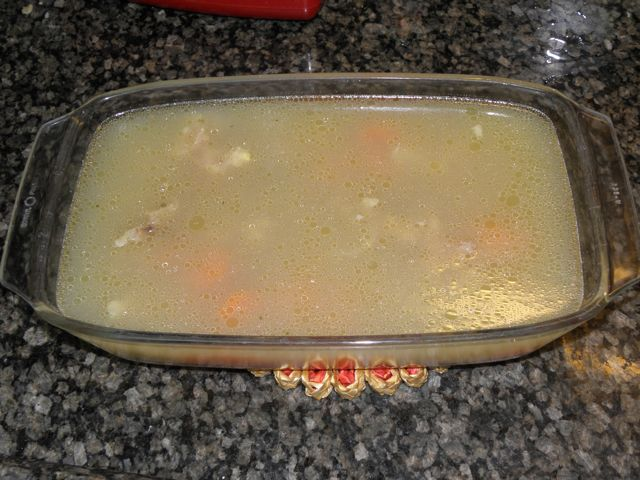
P'tcha

The Second Avenue Deli in Manhattan was one of the few Jewish restaurants in the United States that still had p'tcha on their menus, but does no longer. Given the small and dwindling customer base, p'tcha is now made to order upon request. In 2017, a kosher deli opened in Miami that serves p'tcha.

== See also ==
- Aspic (also known as studen)
- Head cheese
- Kholodets (dish)
- Pacha (dish)
