= Whitefish salad =

Jewish American cuisine

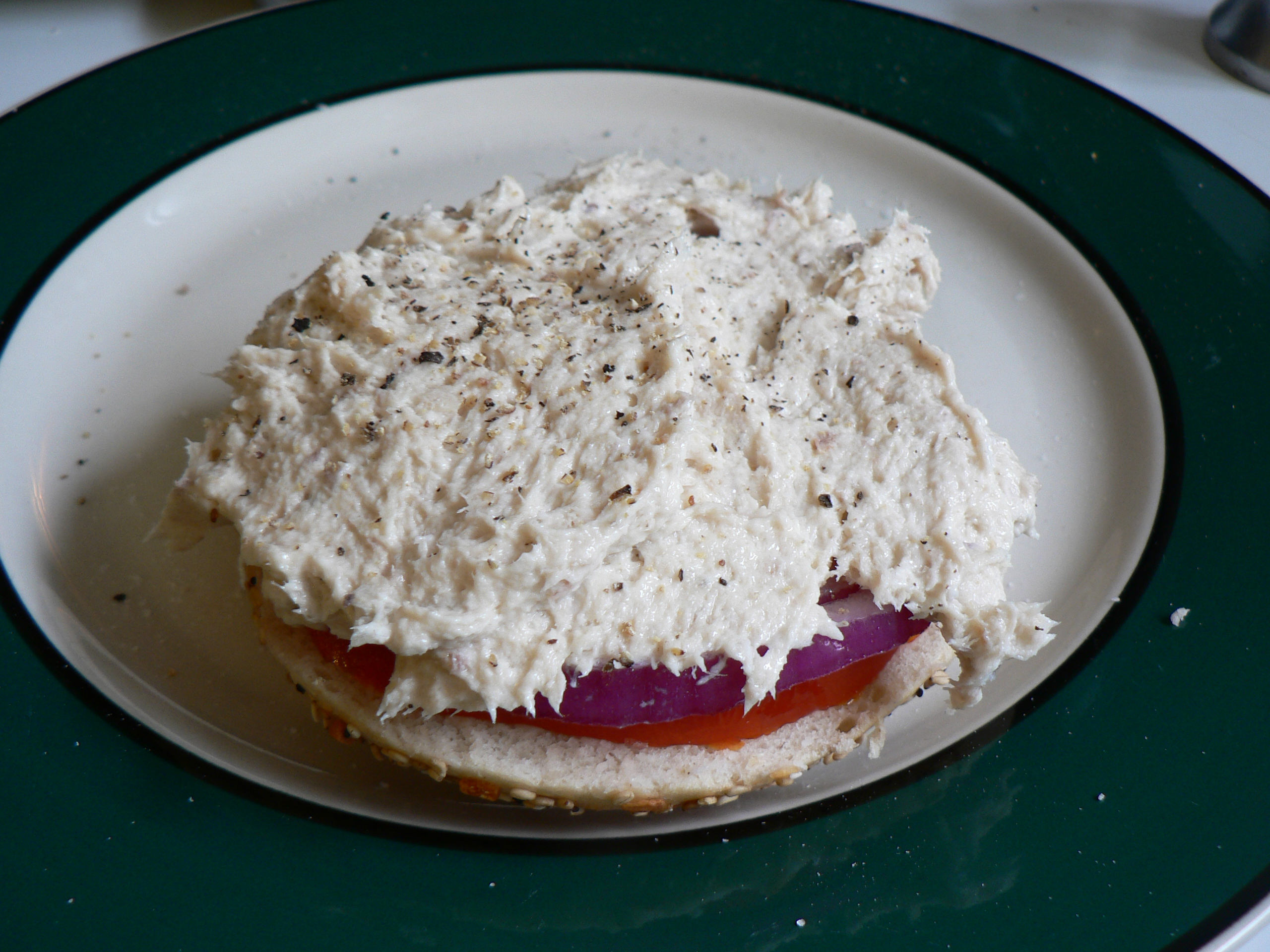
- Whitefish salad on a bagel with onion and tomato
- Course: Breakfast or lunch
- Main ingredients: Freshwater whitefish and mayonnaise

Whitefish salad is a salad of smoked freshwater whitefish and mayonnaise. Whitefish salad is a staple fare of Ashkenazi Jewish American cuisine, often found at appetizing stores and Jewish delicatessens. Food writer Arthur Schwartz describes the dish as "really [a] spread".

Common ingredients in whitefish salad include capers, green peppers, vinegar, mustard, dill, lemon juice, onion, celery, chives, and hard-boiled egg. The mayonnaise can be substituted with sour cream, lebneh, or crème fraîche. The fish is sliced, torn or mashed. Whitefish is often served on a bagel.

Whitefish salad is commonly served for Yom Kippur break fast and Hanukkah, as well as for sitting shivas, bar/bat mitzvahs, and other gatherings. Tablet Magazine founder Alana Newhouse included whitefish salad in her book "The 100 Most Jewish Foods." Food critic Mimi Sheraton recommends whitefish salad as a topping for toast or dark pumpernickel.

Whitefish salad originated in North America among Ashkenazi Jewish immigrants. Ashkenazi Jews discovered that the freshwater whitefish, found in the Great Lakes, was similar to freshwater whitefish found in Europe, and soon smoked freshwater whitefish became a staple of Ashkenazi Jewish appetizing stores and delicatessens and became an iconic example of Jewish American cuisine. The fish was expensive, and it was only in the late-20th century that it became popular as a salad, eaten spread on bagels. Whitefish salad is a popular dish at breakfasts and morning celebrations, including brits and Sunday morning brunches.

== See also ==
- Smoked fish
- Smoked sable
- List of smoked foods
