= Blintz =

Traditional Jewish pancake

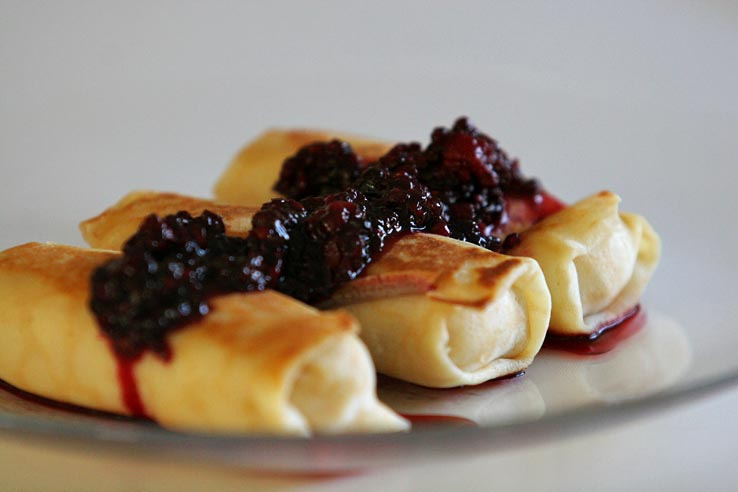
- Traditional cheese blintzes topped with blackberry compote
- Alternative names: Blintzes
- Type: Jewish cuisine
- Place of origin: Eastern Europe
- Created by: Ashkenazi Jewish community
- Serving temperature: Hot, traditionally with sour cream or fruit compote
- Main ingredients: Dough; filling: farmer's cheese or other similar soft cheese, or fruit preserves.

A cheese blintzes or blintz (Hebrew: חֲבִיתִית; Yiddish: בלינצע) is a rolled filled pancake in Ashkenazi Jewish cuisine, in essence a wrap akin to a crêpe or Russian blini.

== History ==
Traditional blintzes are filled with sweetened cheese, sometimes with the addition of raisins, or fruit preserves and then slightly sautéed. They are served on Shavuot. The word blintz in English comes from the Yiddish word בלינצע or blintse, coming from a Slavic word блинец [blin-yets] meaning blin, or pancake.

Like the knishes, blintzes represent foods that are now considered typically Jewish, and exemplify the changes in foods that Jews adopted from their Christian neighbors.

For Passover, matzo meal is used instead of flour.

== See also ==
- Baghrir
- The Russian dish blinchiki, literally "little blini" is a more generic dish, with filings of any kind: cottage cheese, preserves, meat, etc.
- Naleśniki
