= Canjinha =

- Village
- Location of Areia Branca in Sergipe

- Location within Brazil
- Coordinates: 10°47′1″S 37°22′0″W
- Country: Brazil
- State: Sergipe
- Municipality: Areia Branca
- Elevation: 275 m (902 ft)
- Population (2022): 260

Canjinha (Brazilian Portuguese pronunciation: [kɐnˈʒij̃ɐ]) is a village in the municipality of Areia Branca, state of Sergipe, in northeastern Brazil. As of 2022 it had a population of 260. In Portuguese "canjinha" means "small canja", a type of traditional chicken soup in Brazil.

== See also ==
- List of villages in Sergipe
