= Serra Comprida =

- Village
- Location of Areia Branca in Sergipe

- Location within Brazil
- Coordinates: 10°47′55″S 37°22′50″W
- Country: Brazil
- State: Sergipe
- Municipality: Areia Branca
- Elevation: 221 m (725 ft)
- Population (2022): 394

Serra Comprida (Brazilian Portuguese pronunciation: ['sɛʁɐ ˈkʊmpɾidɐ]) is a village in the municipality of Areia Branca, state of Sergipe, in northeastern Brazil. As of 2022 it had a population of 394. In Portuguese "serra comprida" means "long hill", being named after the hill of same name to the east of the village, part of the Serra de Itabaiana national park.

== See also ==
- List of villages in Sergipe
