= Pyrenula inspersicollaris =

Scientific classification
- Kingdom: Fungi
- Division: Ascomycota
- Class: Eurotiomycetes
- Order: Pyrenulales
- Family: Pyrenulaceae
- Genus: Pyrenula
- Species: P. inspersicollaris

Binomial name
- Pyrenula inspersicollaris Aptroot & M.Cáceres (2014)
- Holotype: Serra de Itabaiana National Park, Brazil

Species of lichen

Pyrenula inspersicollaris is a species of corticolous (bark-dwelling), crustose lichen in the family Pyrenulaceae. It is similar to the pantropical species Pyrenula septicollaris but can be distinguished by its inspersed hamathecium (a tissue layer in the ascomata containing oil droplets). The ascospores are 3-septate, meaning they are divided into four sections, and measure 17–20 μm by 5.5–6.5 μm.

The type specimen of Pyrenula inspersicollaris was collected from the southern slope of Serra de Itabaiana National Park in Areia Branca, Sergipe, Brazil, at an elevation of approximately 400 m (1,300 ft). The thallus is thin, dark brown, somewhat glossy, and lacks pseudocyphellae (tiny pores on the surface) and a prothallus (a thin border around the thallus). The ascomata are emergent (partially embedded) in the bark and fully covered by the thallus. They are pyriform (pear-shaped), 0.3–0.5 mm in diameter, and usually occur in clusters of 2–7 with fused ostioles (openings). The walls of the ascomata are completely carbonised (blackened), and the ostioles are lateral (located on the sides). The hamathecium contains hyaline (translucent) oil droplets. The ascospores are brown, irregularly biseriate (arranged in two rows), and have mostly rounded internal cavities separated from the wall by a thick layer.

Pyrenula inspersicollaris does not have pycnidia (small asexual fruiting bodies). Chemically, the thallus does not fluoresce under ultraviolet light, and no lichen products were detected using thin-layer chromatography.

Pyrenula inspersicollaris grows on smooth bark in undisturbed Atlantic rainforests and is only known from Brazil. This species is notable for its inspersed hamathecium, which distinguishes it from Pyrenula septicollaris that also grows in the same area.

== See also ==
- List of Pyrenula species
