= Chicken soup =

Soup made from chicken

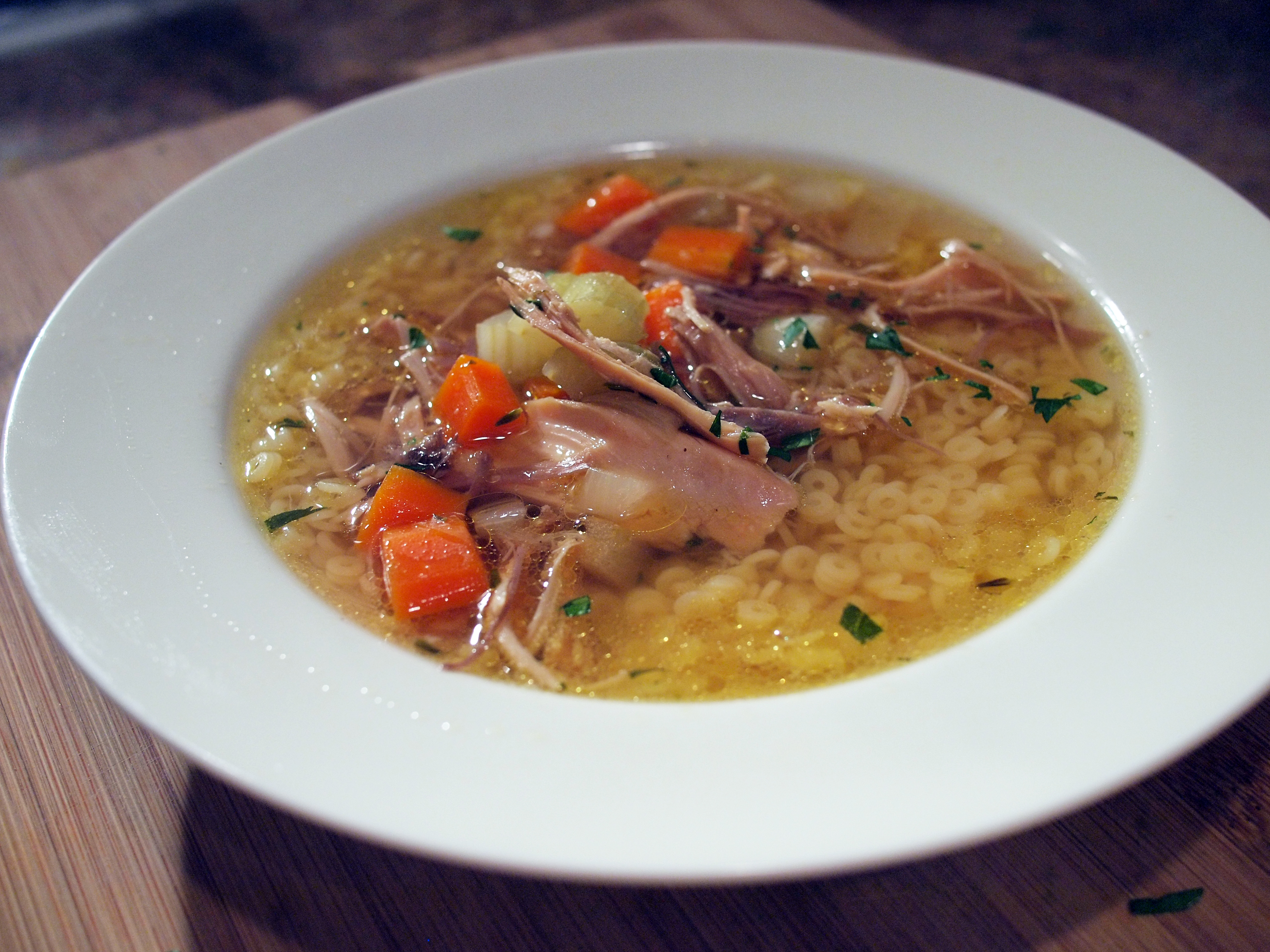
- A classic preparation of chicken noodle soup made with a stewing hen and flavored with thyme and black pepper
- Type: Soup
- Course: Appetizer or main course
- Region or state: Global
- Serving temperature: Hot
- Main ingredients: Chicken, noodles

Chicken soup is a soup made from chicken, simmered in water, usually with various other ingredients. The classic chicken soup consists of a clear chicken broth, often with pieces of chicken or vegetables; common additions are pasta, noodles, dumplings, carrots, potatoes, or grains such as rice and barley. Chicken soup is commonly considered a comfort food.

== History ==
Humans were already boiling food by the time that chicken was domesticated in the Neolithic period, so it is likely that chickens were being boiled for soup.

Modern American chicken soup, which typically includes root vegetables such as carrot, onion, leeks and celery, was a staple across Northern Europe and was brought to the United States by immigrants. Some variants include noodles, and thus are called chicken noodle soup.

== Preparation ==
Variations on the flavor are gained by adding root vegetables such as parsnip, potato, sweet potato and celery root; herbs such as bay leaves, parsley and dill; other vegetables such as zucchini, whole garlic cloves, lettuce, or tomatoes; and black pepper. The soup should be brought slowly to a boil and then simmered in a covered pot on a very low flame for one to three hours, adding water if necessary. Saffron or turmeric are sometimes added as a yellow colorant.

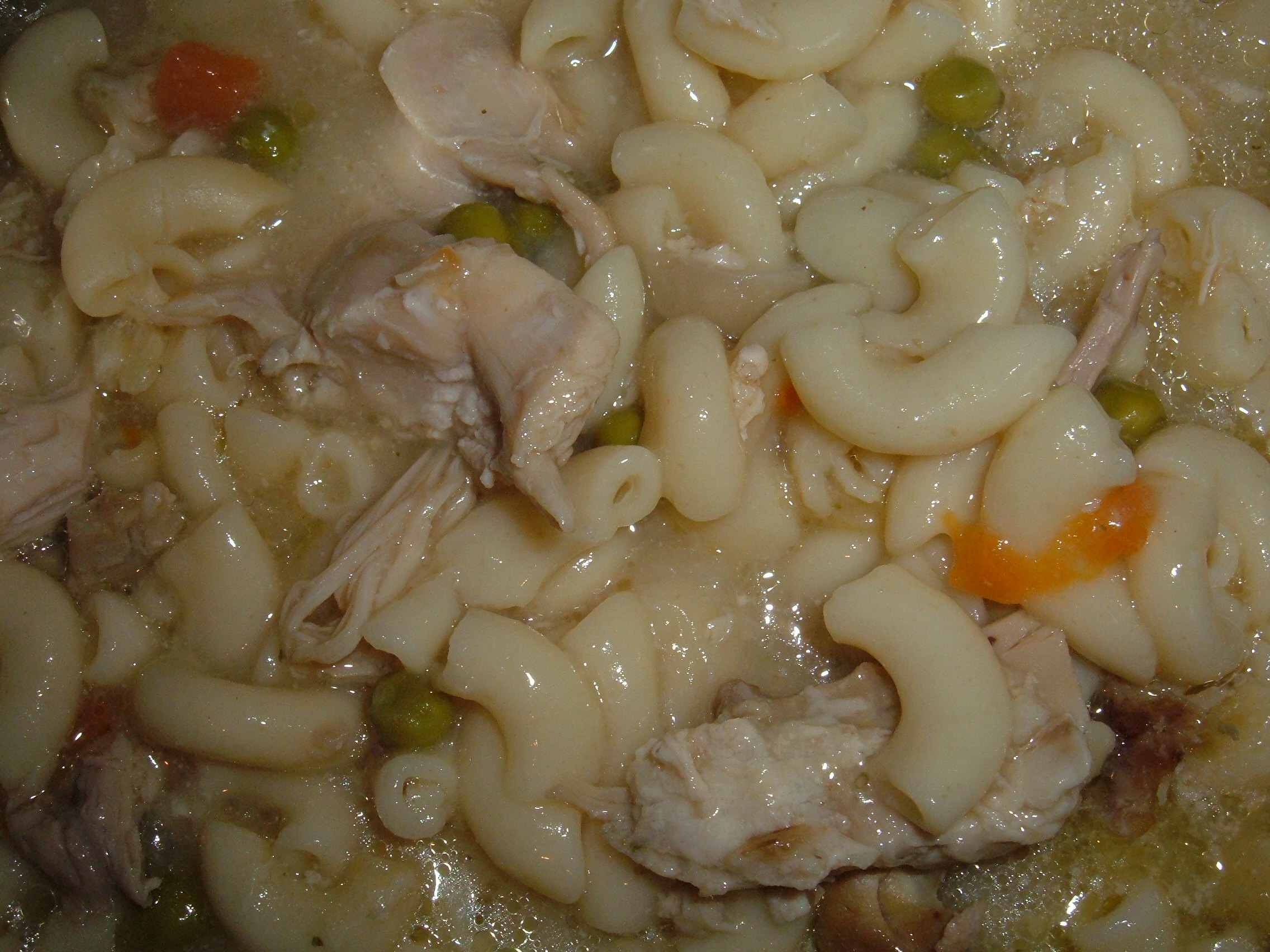
Homemade chicken soup with elbow macaroni, chicken pieces, carrots and celery

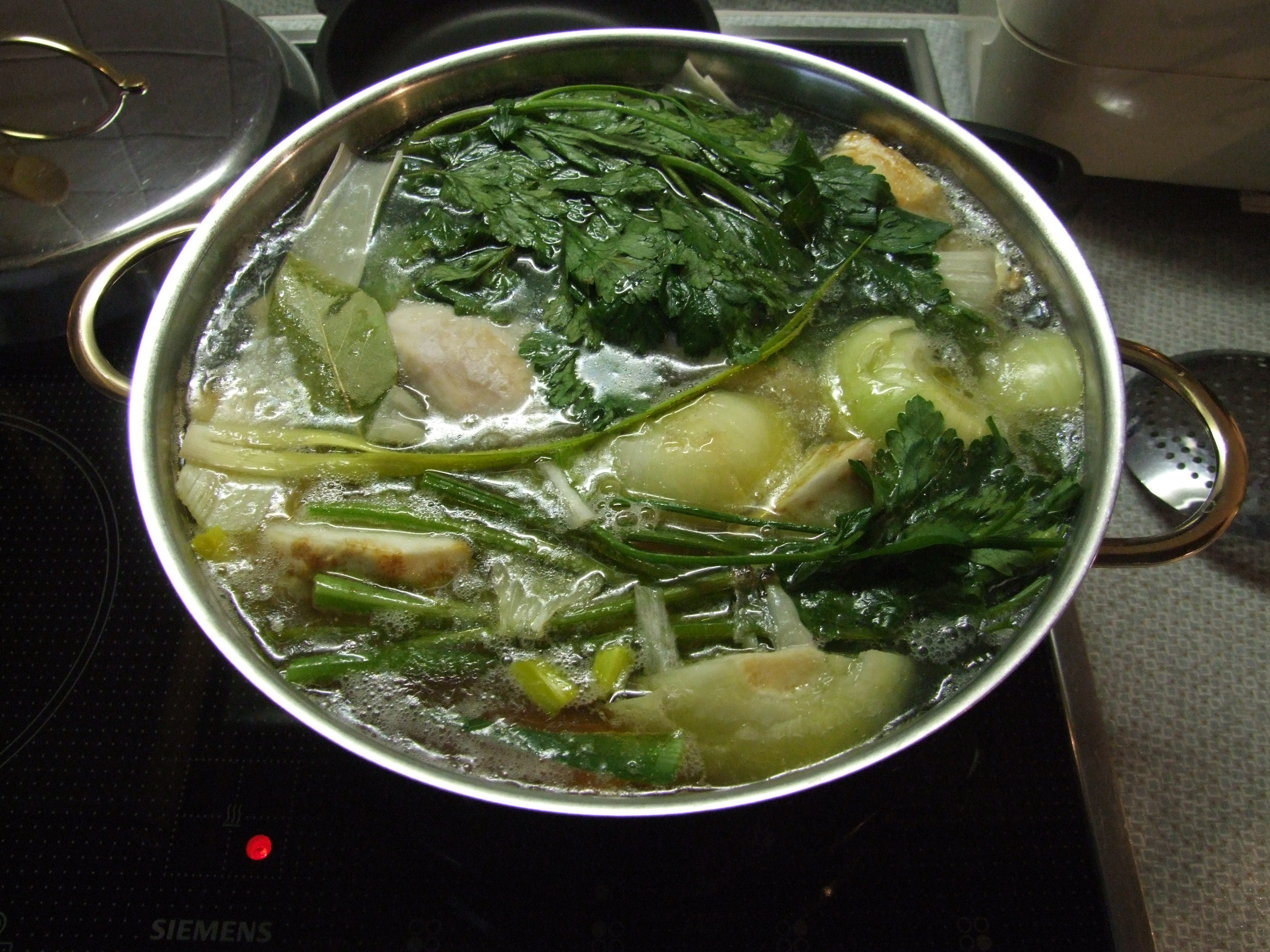
Chicken soup with dark, leafy greens

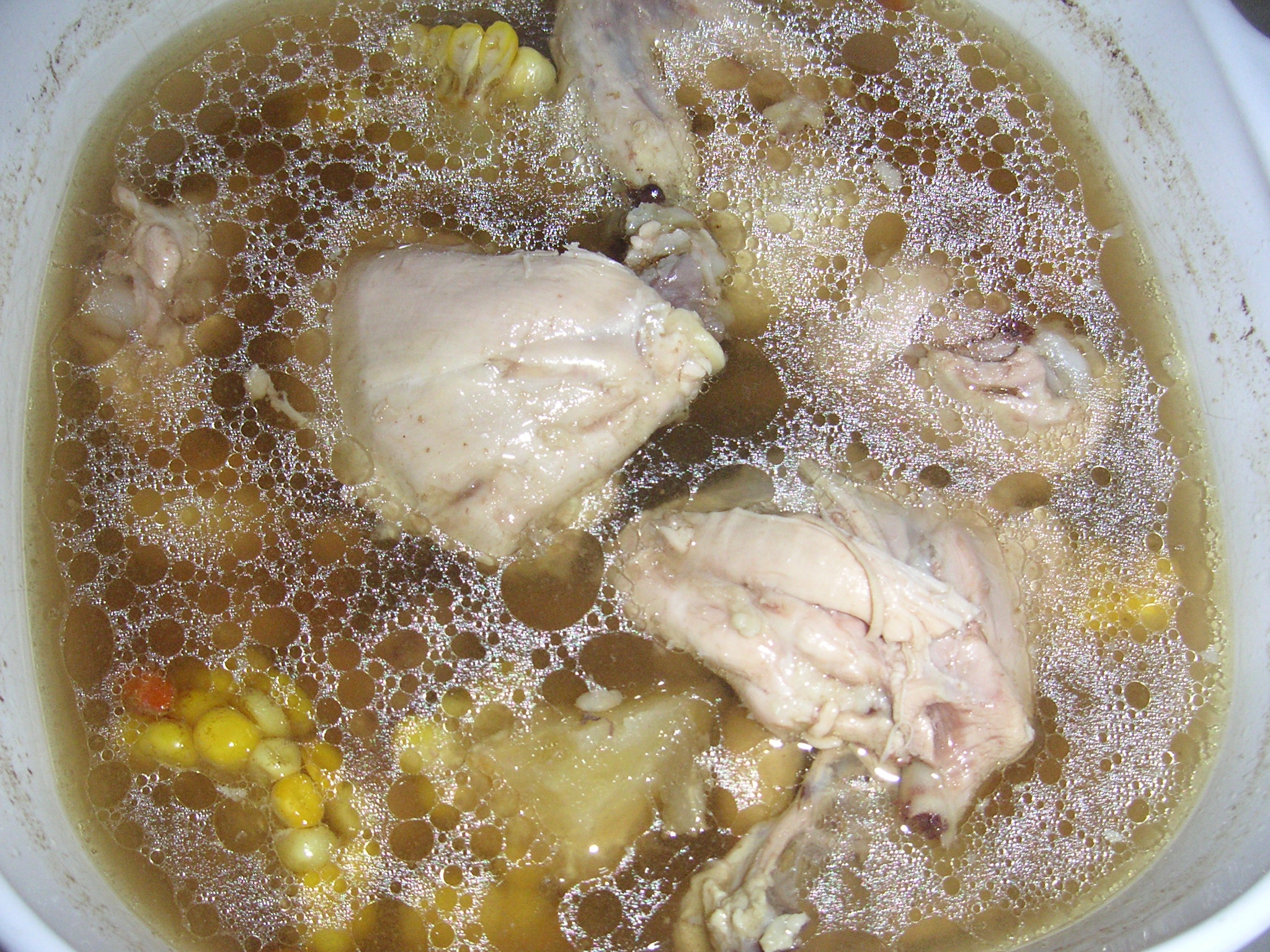
Southern Chinese-style chicken soup with mushrooms and corn pieces

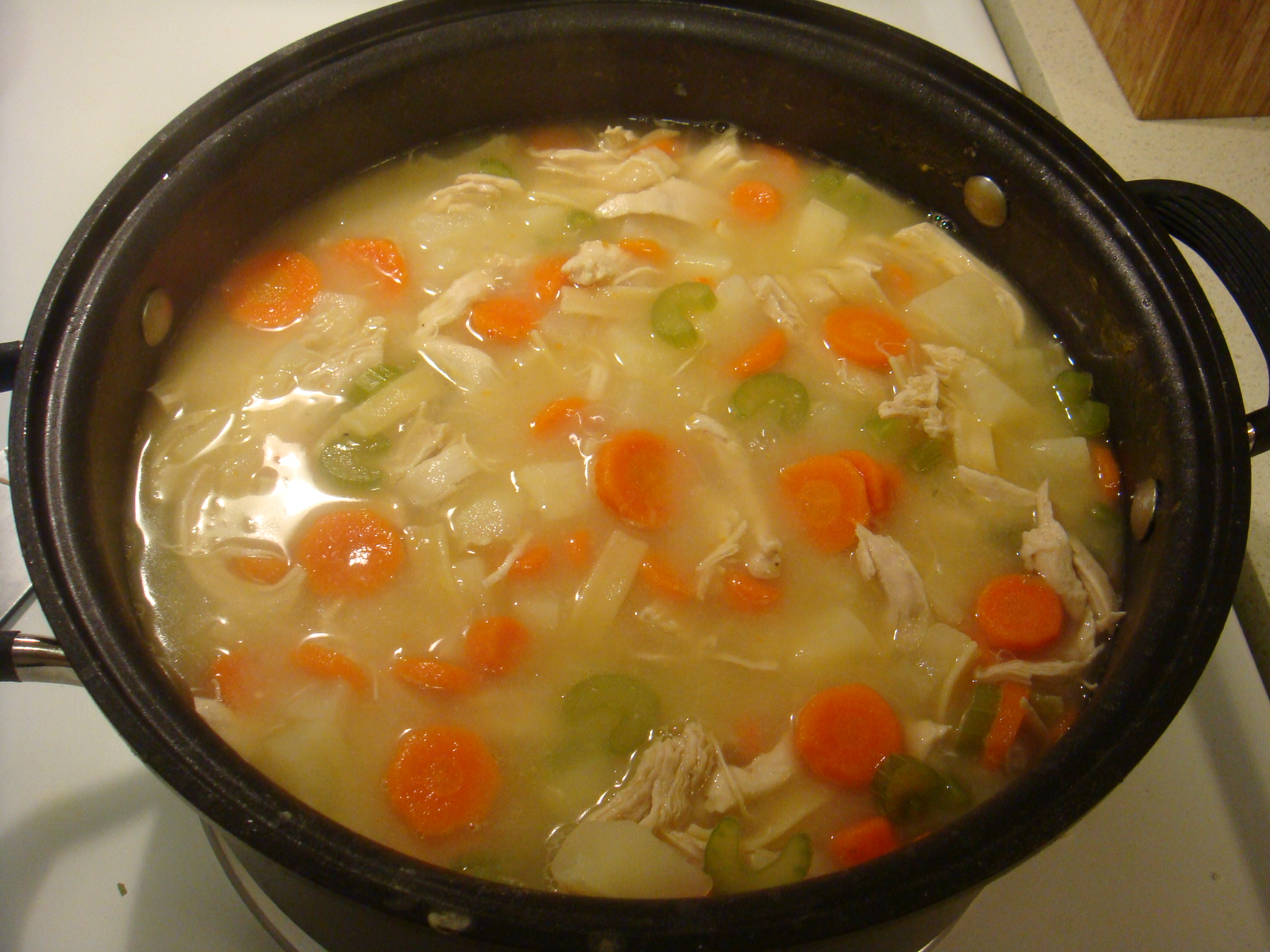
Homemade chicken noodle soup cooking

== Nutritional value ==
Chicken soup can be a relatively low fat food: fat can be removed by chilling the soup after cooking and skimming the layer of congealed fat from the top. A study determined that "prolonged cooking of a bone in soup increases the calcium content of the soup when cooked at an acidic, but not at a neutral pH".

== Terminology ==
Strictly speaking, chicken soup, unless qualified, implies that the soup is served as a thin broth, with pieces of meat, and possibly vegetables, and either noodles, rice, barley, or dumplings.

Cream of chicken soup is a thick, creamy, soup made with chicken stock and pieces, combined with milk (or cream) and flour, which might contain vegetable pieces, depending on the recipe.

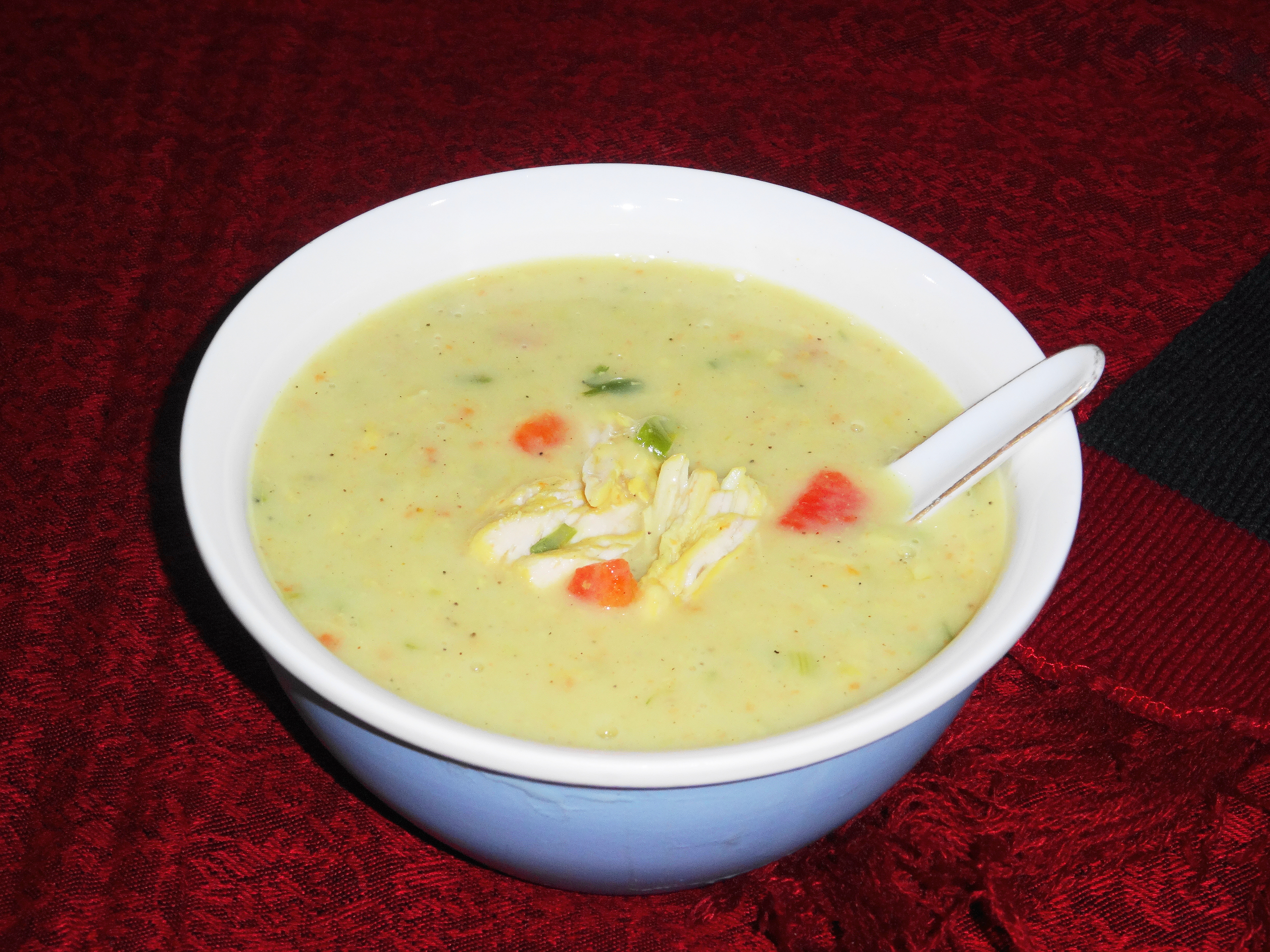
Cream of chicken soup

Several terms are used when referring to chicken soups:

- Chicken broth is the liquid part of chicken soup. Broth can be served as is, or used as stock, or served as soup with noodles. Broth can be milder than stock, does not need to be boiled as long, and can be made with meatier chicken parts.
- Chicken bouillon or bouillon de poulet is the French term for chicken broth.
- Chicken consommé is a more refined chicken broth. It is usually strained to perfect clarity, and reduced to concentrate it.
- Chicken stew is a more substantial dish with a higher ratio of solids to broth. The broth may also be thickened toward a gravy-like consistency with a roux or by adding flour-based dumplings (matzah balls do not have the same thickening effect).
- Chicken stock is a liquid in which chicken bones and vegetables have been simmered for the purpose of serving as an ingredient in more complex dishes. Chicken stock is not usually served as is. Stock can be made with less palatable parts of the chicken, such as feet, necks or bones: the higher bone content in these parts contributes more gelatin to the liquid, making it a better base for sauces. Stock can be reboiled and reused as the basis for a new stock. Bouillon cubes or soup base are often used instead of chicken stock prepared from scratch.

== Health effects ==
Chicken soup with carrot, fresh coriander, onion and green chillies

Chicken soup has long been touted as a form of folk medicine to treat respiratory infections, particularly the common cold and influenza. In 2000, scientists at the University of Nebraska Medical Center in Omaha studied the effect of chicken soup on the inflammatory response in vitro. They found that some components of the chicken soup inhibit neutrophil migration, which may have an anti-inflammatory effect that could hypothetically lead to temporary ease from symptoms of illness. However, since these results have been obtained from purified cells (and directly applied), the diluted soup in vivo effect is debatable. The New York Times reviewed the University of Nebraska study, among others, in 2007 and concluded that "none of the research is conclusive, and it is not known whether the changes measured in the laboratory really have a meaningful effect on people with cold symptoms."

It has also been shown that chicken soup contains the amino acid cysteine, which is very similar to acetylcysteine, which is used by doctors for patients with bronchitis and other respiratory infections.

Chicken soup is also known as "Jewish penicillin".

== In different cultures ==
=== China ===
Many Chinese soups are based on chicken broth. Typical Chinese chicken soup is made from old hens and is seasoned with ginger, scallions, black pepper, soy sauce, rice wine and sesame oil. A more elaborate version can be made from freshly killed spent hen and various herbs such as ginseng, dried goji, and old ginger root. The soup is then boiled for hours.

=== Colombia ===
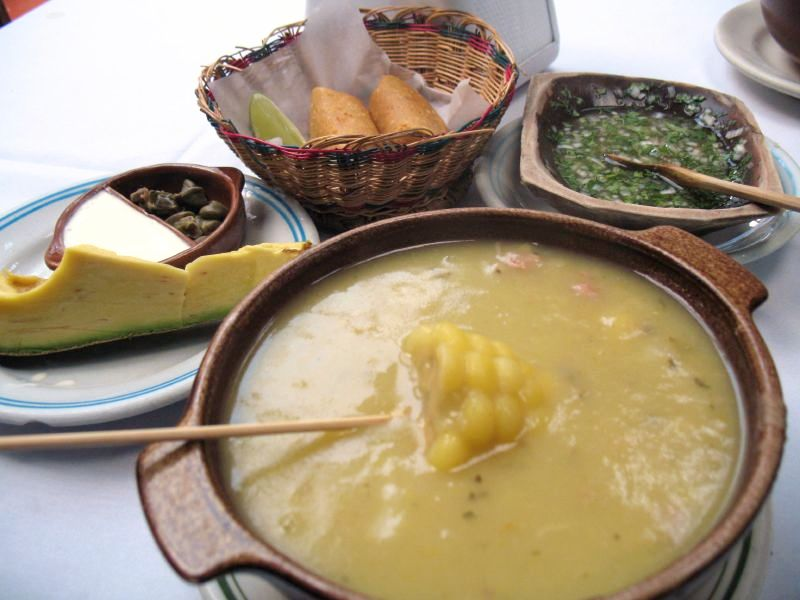
Ajiaco of Bogotá, Colombia

Bogotá, Colombia's capital, is known for a version of chicken soup called ajiaco. Along with chicken, ajiaco typically includes maize, three types of potatoes, avocado, capers, and the herb guascas, and is served with a dollop of cream.

Sancocho de gallina is another popular dish throughout Colombia and in neighboring countries. This is a broth that includes entire pieces of (often rather tough) soup hen on the bone with large pieces of plantain, potato, cassava and/or other vegetables. A bowl of sancocho is usually an entire meal.

=== Denmark ===
The Danish hønsekødssuppe is traditionally cooked using large hens specifically reserved for soup, known as suppehøner ("soup-hens"). Vegetables like celeriac, carrots, onions and leek are usually added and typical flavourings are thyme, laurels and white pepper. The soup may be served with small white dumplings and meatballs. As part of traditional housekeeping, the cooked meat is reserved for other dishes such as høns i asparges ("hens in asparagus") or hønsesalat ("hens-salad").

=== France ===
The French serve chicken-based forms of bouillon and consommé. Typical French seasonings for chicken soup include bay leaves, fresh thyme, dry white wine and garlic.

=== Germany ===
In Germany, chicken soup is made with chicken broth, vegetables, such as carrots, spices and herbs and small noodles. For the broth, a large hen, called a Suppenhuhn (lit.: "soup hen"), may be boiled, and pieces of it—especially from the boiled breast—can later be added to the soup. In southern Germany, homemade chicken soup typically consists of chicken broth, to which spices and semolina dumplings or noodles are added. Another dish made with chicken broth, pieces of chicken, boiled vegetables, and spices is known as Hühnereintopf, meaning "chicken stew". Alternatively, homemade noodles may be added to the chicken broth, without vegetables, and with only pickling spice, salt and pepper added.

=== Ghana ===
In Ghana, chicken soup, also known as "chicken light" soup, is made by cooking chicken in a blended mixture of tomatoes, onions, pepper and other spices, and sometimes eggs; it is served primarily with fufu or on its own.

=== Greece ===
In Greece, chicken soup is most commonly made in the avgolemono ("egg-lemon") fashion, wherein beaten eggs mixed with lemon are added to a broth slowly so that the mixture heats up without curdling, also adding rice or pasta like kritharáki ("little barley;" orzo), resulting in a thicker texture. It is a traditional remedy for colds, stomach aches, and hangovers.

=== Hungary ===
Hungarian chicken soup is a clear soup, a consommé, called Újházi chicken soup. A consommé with entire pieces of chicken, chicken liver and heart, with chunky vegetables and spices like whole black peppercorn, bay leaves, salt and ground black pepper. The vegetables boiled along with the pieces of chicken are usually carrots, celeriac, parsley root and parsnip. Soup vermicelli, semolina dumplings or thin spätzle noodles or small dumplings are also added to the soup. Other vegetables may be used, such as green peas, a whole tomato and whole onions boiled along with the soup, mushrooms, asparagus, celery, green pepper, cauliflower, kohlrabi, green beans, or parsley, in different combinations.

=== Indonesia ===
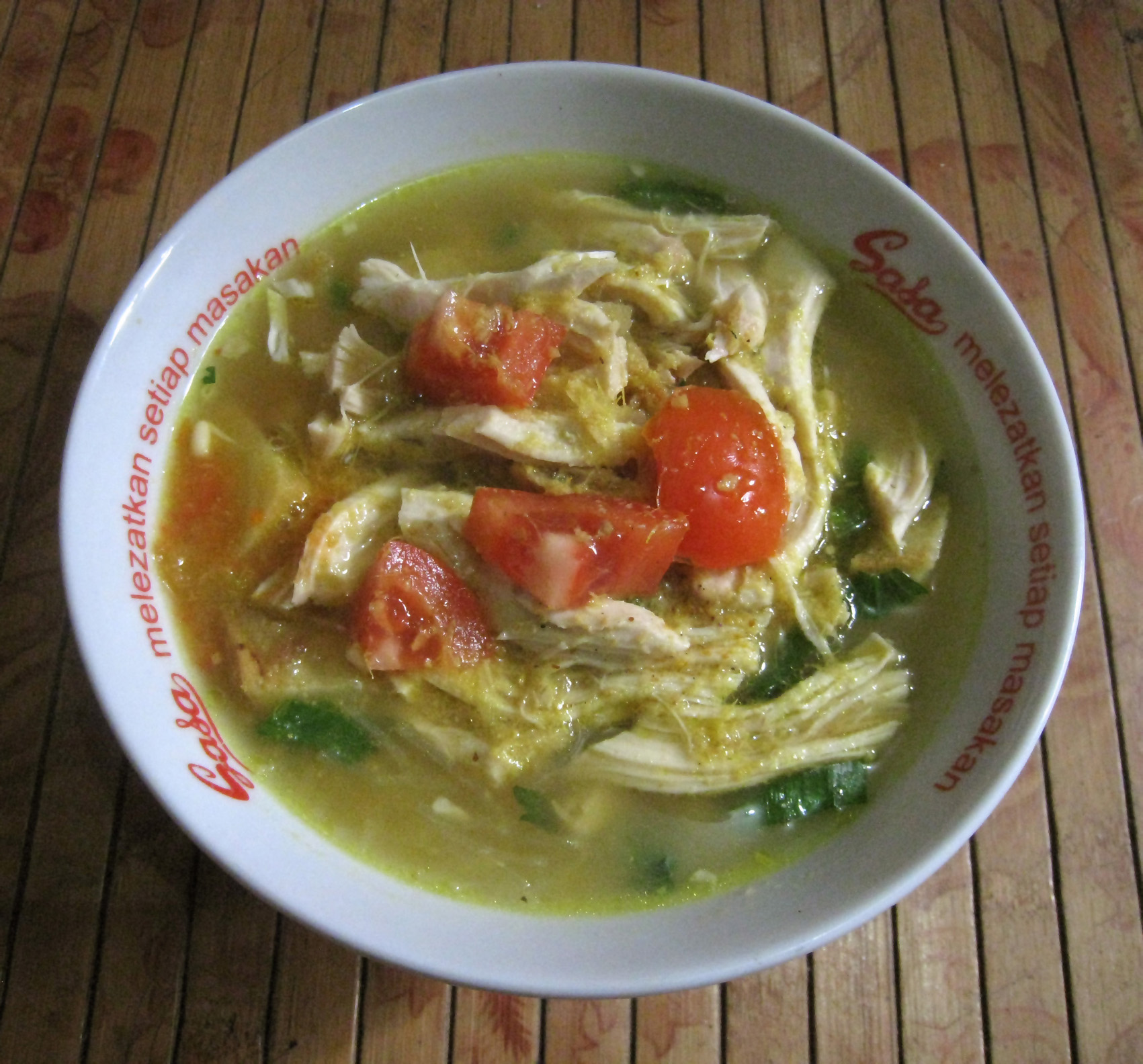
Soto ayam, a version of chicken soup popular in Indonesia

In Indonesia, chicken soup might appear as sayur sop, vegetable and chicken broth soup that contains chicken pieces, potato, green beans, carrot, celery, and fried shallot. Another chicken soup variant commonly found across the country is soto ayam; a turmeric yellow spicy chicken soup with vegetables and noodle or vermicelli, served with steamed rice, pieces of lontong or ketupat.

=== Italy ===
In Italy, chicken soup is often served with pasta, in such dishes as cappelletti in brodo, tortellini in brodo and passatelli. Even when served on its own, the meat and any vegetables used are usually removed from the broth and served as a second dish.

=== Japan ===
In Japan, chicken soup is known as torijiru. Typically it starts with dashi, which is made from boiling konbu (kelp) and katsuobushi (dried skipjack tuna flakes), and not by boiling the chicken. After the dashi is prepared, pieces of boneless chicken thigh meat are usually used and combined with vegetables like daikon radish, carrot, burdock, konnyaku, welsh onion, mushrooms, potatoes, and taro root. At the end, different seasonings are added depending on the region of the country or type of soup. It could be a miso-based soup or soy sauce-based. Cooking sake, mirin, salt, and vinegar are also used with the soy sauce or miso. The pork equivalent called butajiru is more popular than the chicken-based soup.

Bone stocks for ramen are also often made with chicken stock, and it is almost invariably used in the less common kotteri variety.

=== Jewish (Ashkenazi) ===
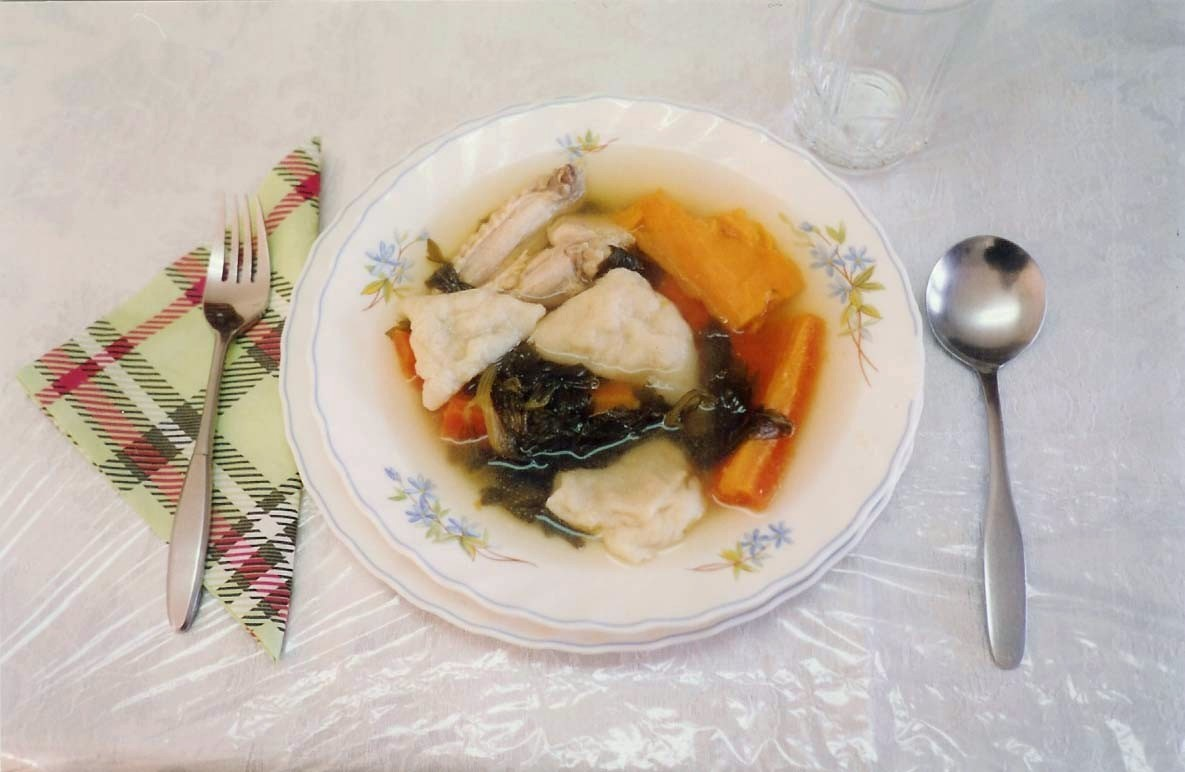
Kreplach shaped in the form of hamantashen float in a bowl of chicken soup made for the Purim seudah.

Chicken soup, sometimes called Jewish penicillin, is a traditional dish of the European Jewish kitchen. The Russian and Polish Jewish communities use a relatively high proportion of chicken stock for their soup, made mostly from the bones. The soup is prepared with herbs such as parsley, fresh dill, and thyme. It is often served with matzah balls, kreplach (dumplings), lokshen (flat egg noodles), or shkedei marak (soup nuts/mandlakh). A traditional garnish was eyerlekh (little eggs), unlaid chicken eggs taken from a hen and boiled in the soup. Modern health standards make these difficult to obtain now.

=== Korea ===
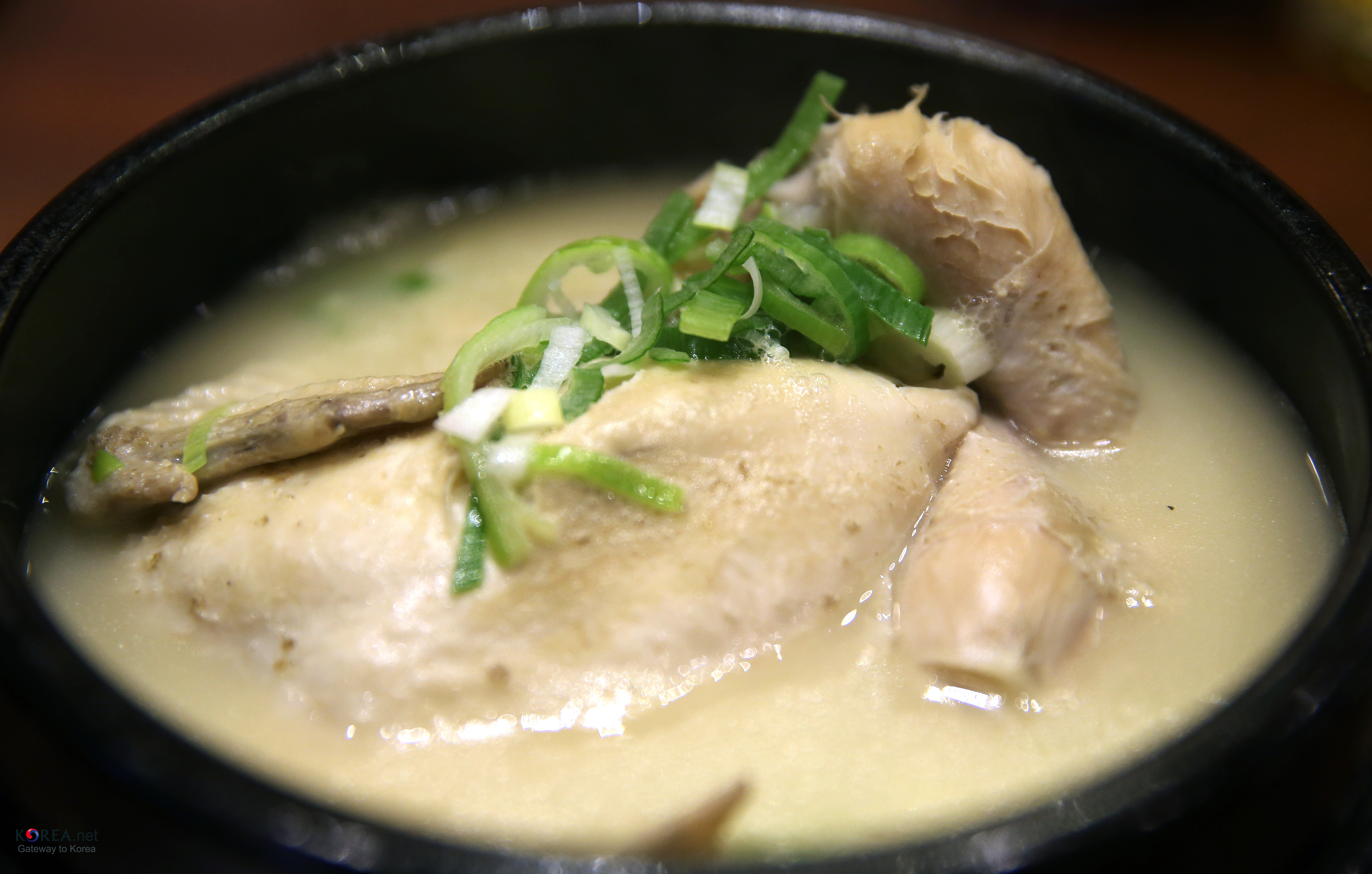
Samgyetang, a Korean chicken soup

Samgyetang is a Korean chicken soup with insam (Korean ginseng), daechu (dried jujube fruits), garlic, ginger, glutinous rice, and sometimes other medicinal herbs. It is believed to be not only a cure for physical ailments but also a preventer of sickness. Dak baeksuk, a type of chicken broth with garlic, is also popular among Koreans. It is believed by some to help cure minor illnesses such as the common cold. Some types of baeksuk also contains noodles, similar to chicken noodle soup.

=== Mexico ===
Caldo de pollo, also known as consome de pollo, is a common Latin American soup made with whole chicken pieces instead of chopped or shredded chicken, and large cuts of vegetables, such as half-slices of potatoes and whole leaves of cabbage. Another variation of chicken soup is caldo tlalpeño which is garnished with chopped avocado, white cheese, and a chipotle chile.

=== Peru ===
Aguadito de pollo is a traditional chicken soup in Peruvian cuisine consisting of chicken, cilantro, vegetables and spices.

Caldo de gallina (lit., "broth of hen"), the Peruvian form of chicken soup, is made with whole pieces of chicken instead of chopped or shredded chicken, along with potatoes, egg noodles, and hard-boiled eggs. Lime wedges and chili or aji pepper paste are added as condiments.

=== Philippines ===
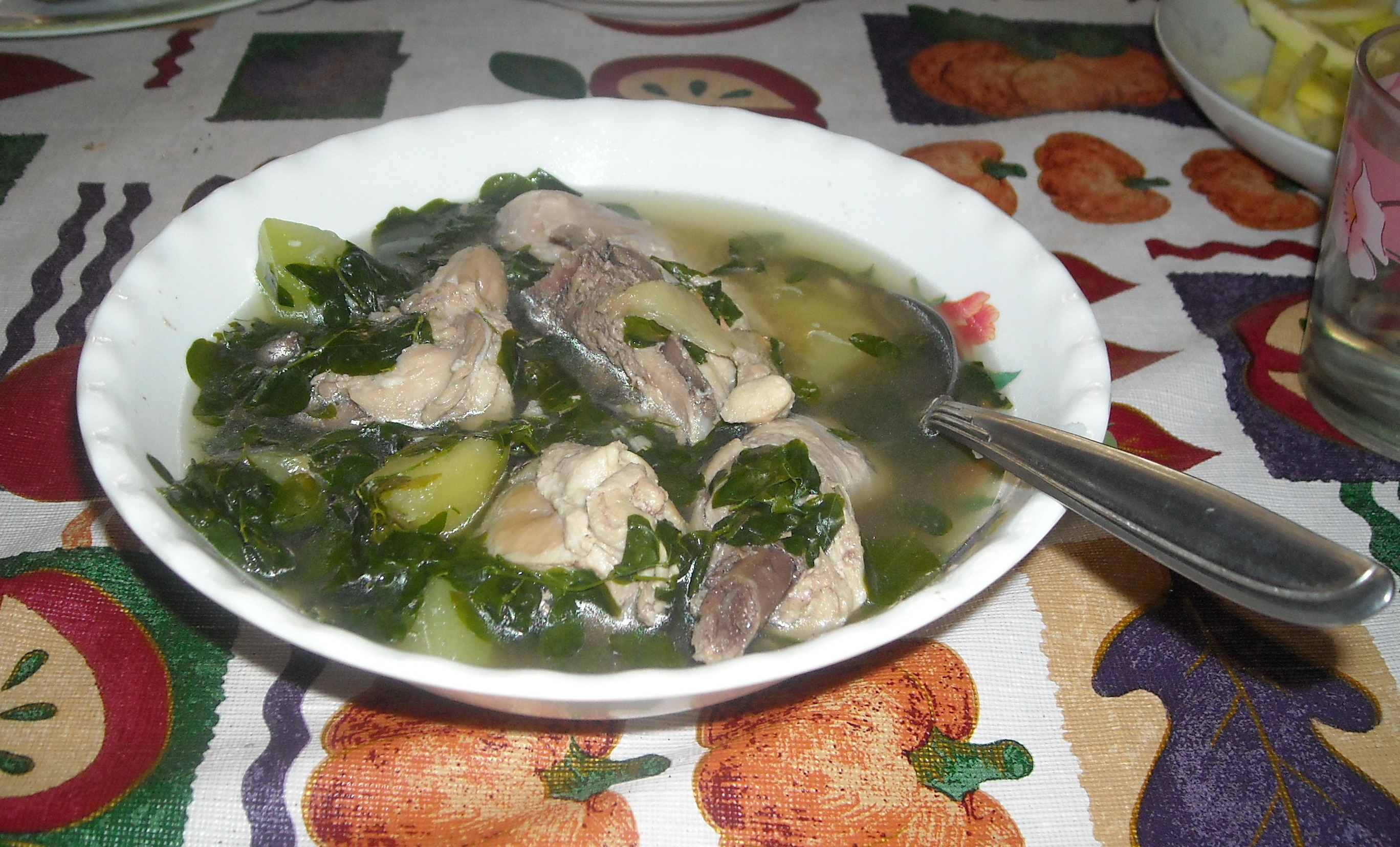
A bowl of tinola, a chicken soup from the Philippines

Chicken soup in the Philippines is called sopas and has some western influences in it. While there are many variations in the recipe, it usually contains chicken strips in broth, onions, vegetables (mainly carrots, cabbage and celery), and macaroni noodles. It is cooked with evaporated milk to give it richer flavor. Sopas is normally associated with the cold, rainy season in the Philippines, and may thus be regarded as local comfort food.

Another chicken soup is called mami which its style derives from its other Asian neighboring countries, especially East Asia and normally served with sliced chicken, broth, noodles, chopped vegetables. Mami is also associated with the cold, rainy season as well.

Other chicken dishes are considered soups. Tinola has chicken cuts in broth, with ginger, chayote, and chili pepper leaves. Sinampalukang manok is sometimes regarded as a chicken version of sinigang, but here the meat is browned first before being boiled in the water and it uses tamarind leaves. Kadyos, manok, kag ubad from the Western Visayas uses pigeon peas and banana pith.

=== Poland ===
The Polish chicken soup is called rosół. It is commonly served with fine noodles, boiled carrots and parsley every Sunday. The broth is served separate from chicken meat.

There are many types of rosół, as:

Rosół Królewski (royal rosół), made of three meats: beef or veal, white poultry (hen, turkey or chicken) and dark poultry as duck, goose (crop only), just a couple of dried king boletes, one single cabbage leaf and a variety of vegetables such as włoszczyzna (parsley, celery, carrot, and leek). The cooking must take at least six hours of sensitive boiling over a small fire. At the end, softly burnt onion is added to the soup.

Rosół myśliwski (The hunter's rosół) is made of a variety of wild birds as well as pheasant, capercaillie, wood grouse, black grouse, or grey partridge, with a small addition of roe deer meat, a couple of wild mushrooms, and 2–3 juniper fruits.

=== Portugal and Brazil ===
Chicken soup is known as canja, a chicken broth prepared with rice or pasta and shredded chicken meat. It is believed to help a person overcome colds and digestive problems, among other mild forms of sickness.

=== Romania and Moldova ===
In most regions of Romania, chicken soup known as supă de pui consists of a clear or dense sour soup with strained chicken and vegetable broth, and either noodles (tăieței) or dumplings (găluște) are added. Different versions use pieces of chicken and pieces of boiled vegetables (like onion, carrot, parsnip, celery, zucchini, peas, beans, leaves and root of parsley or peppers) and are seasoned usually with sour cream (smântână), tomato juice, lemon juice, or borș.

=== Taiwan ===
In Taiwan-style chicken soup, dried jujube fruits, dried shiitake, and other various herbs are also sometimes added. While it may be possible to use regular ginseng in the recipe, a special type of ginseng called san qi is commonly used. This is grown almost exclusively in Wenshan County, Yunnan Province. The roots are powdered for ease of use, although it may also be possible to use the flowerheads.

=== Russia and Ukraine ===
East Slavs traditionally prefer an often simple chicken and vegetable bouillon with added noodles or rice, and a pinch of fresh herbs. Another type of chicken soup includes chicken, noodles, carrot, potato and onion. Some cooks add chopped boiled egg and even sour cream to their variations of the soup.

=== United Kingdom ===
Traditionally, chicken soup in Britain is a thick broth with chunky vegetables (such as leeks, carrot, celery and onion), chicken, salt and pepper. However, a thick, creamy variety called cream of chicken soup, which may not contain any vegetable pieces (depending on the recipe), is more popular today. A distinct version from Scotland that has become popular throughout the UK is cock-a-leekie soup, a clear, thin broth of shredded chicken and leeks.

=== United States and Canada ===
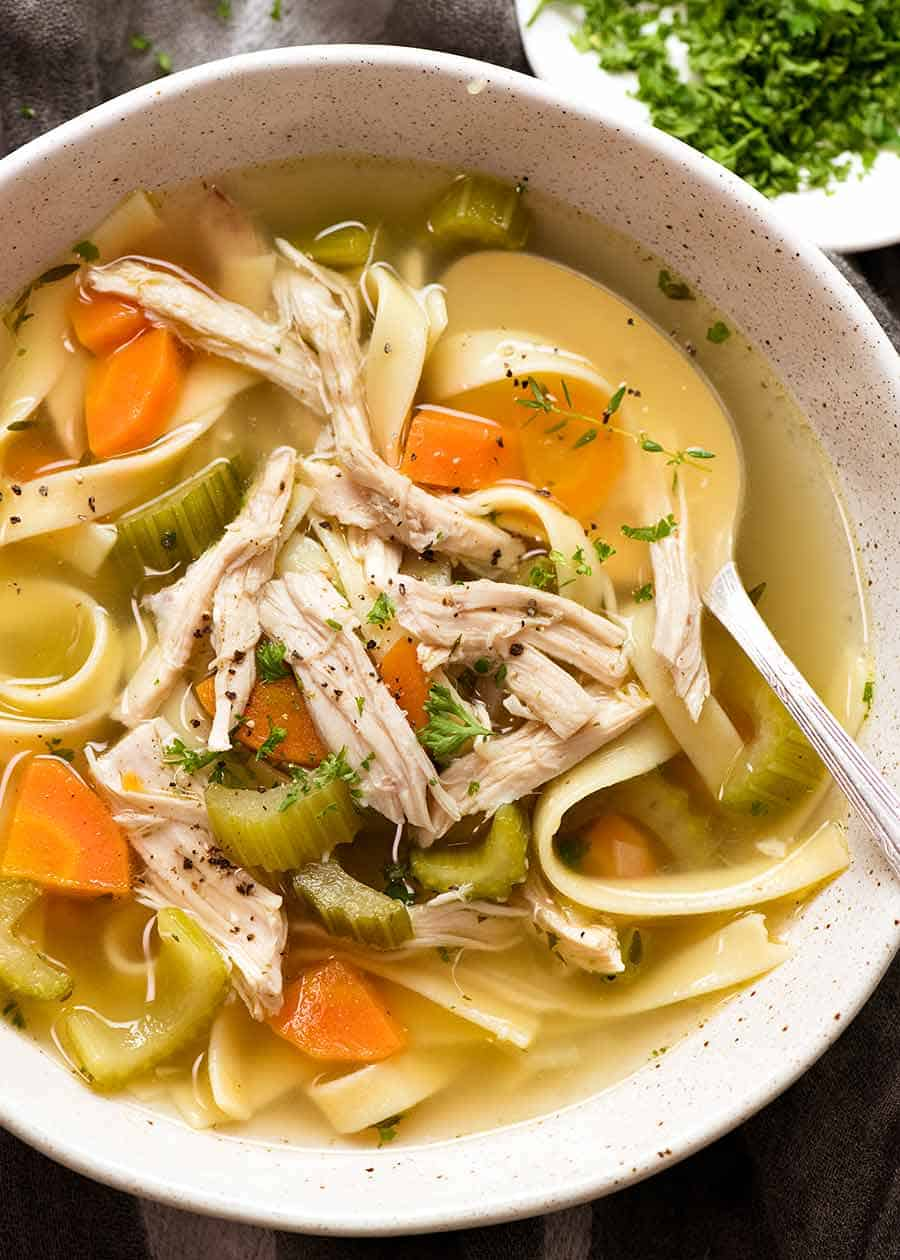
American-style chicken noodle soup.

In the United States and Canada, chicken soup often has noodles or rice in it, thus giving it its common name of "chicken noodle soup". The term may have been first used in advertising by the Campbell's in the 1930s. The original 21 varieties of Campbell's condensed soup featured a "chicken soup with noodles", but when it was advertised on the Amos 'n' Andy radio show in the 1930s by a slip of the tongue the soup was referred to as "chicken noodle soup". Traditionally, American chicken soup was prepared using old hens, with meat too tough and stringy to be roasted or cooked for a short time. In modern times, these fowl are difficult to come by, and broiler chickens (young chickens suitable for roasting or broiling) are often used in preparation of soup.

==== Canned chicken soup ====
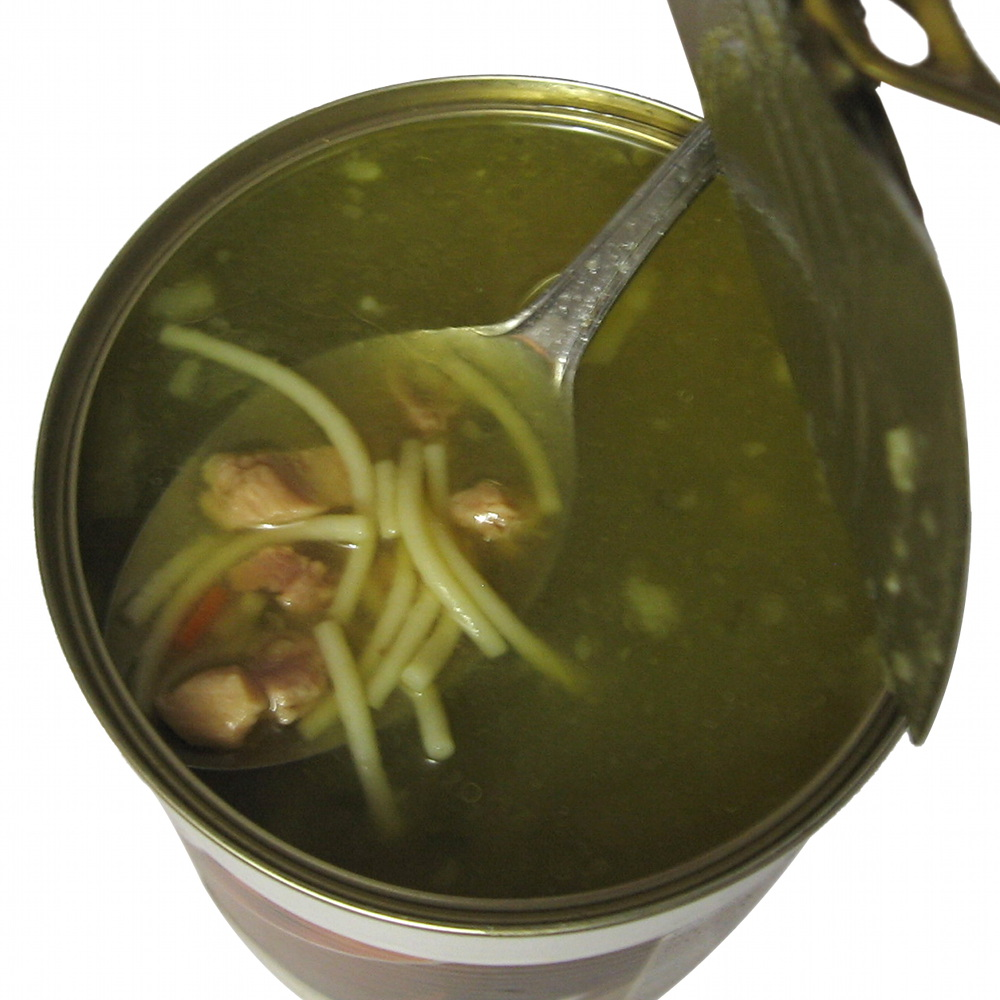
Canned chicken soup (not condensed)

Often (but not always) sold as a condensed soup, canned chicken soup such as Campbell's Chicken Noodle Soup, is notable for its high sodium content: 890 mg per 1/2 cup serving. This gives a 1 1/2 cup bowl of soup about 2,500 mg of sodium, a full day's allowance in the case of this mainstream brand. Other condensed chicken soups produced by Campbell's, such as Chicken with Rice or Chicken & Stars Soup, have similar amounts, as do generic versions of the product.

Canned chicken soup with much less sodium than the traditional formulation is available, including many varieties produced by Campbell's, some with as little as 100 mg of sodium. Campbell's claims production of a chicken noodle soup that will find broad consumer acceptance—in short, that will sell—is very difficult, so it has to balance healthfulness with sodium content.

Usually, the main ingredients of this canned soup are:

- Chicken broth
- Chicken
- Noodles
- Carrots
- Salt
- Celery, lettuce, or mushrooms, depending on the brand

== In media ==
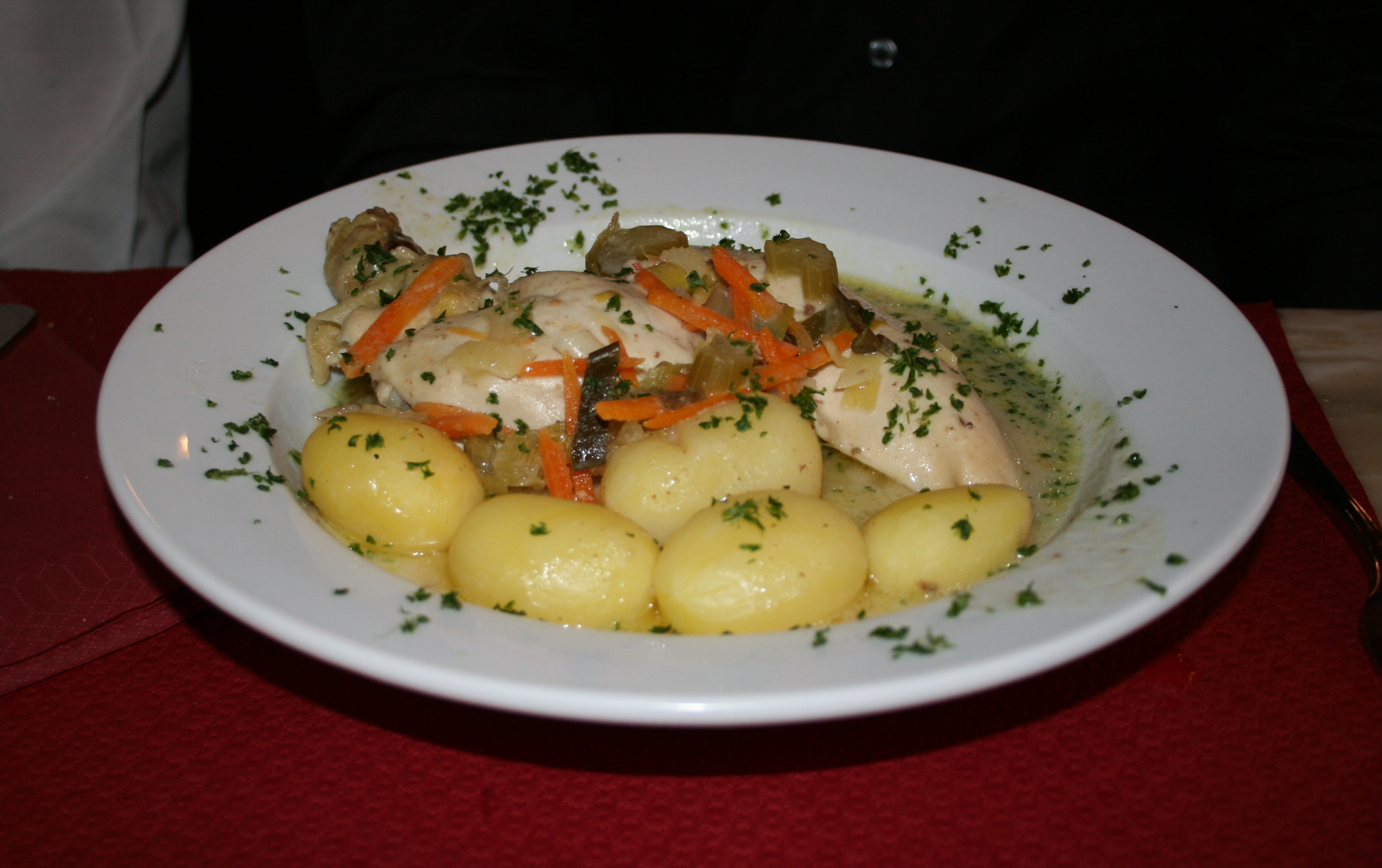
Waterzooi made with chicken, potatoes and cream

- There is a series of motivational therapy books entitled Chicken Soup for the Soul.
- Chicken Soup was the title of a short-lived 1989 ABC sitcom starring Jackie Mason.
- "Chicken Noodle Soup" featuring Young B. was made into a popular hip-hop song by DJ Webstar.
- Chicken Soup with Barley is a 1956 play by British playwright Arnold Wesker. It explores the challenges faced by a family of communist Jewish immigrants in the UK from 1936 to 1956.
- Chicken Soup with Rice is a poem by author and illustrator Maurice Sendak published in 1962 as part of his Nutshell Library book series. It was popularized in 1975 by an animated musical TV special titled Really Rosie. Carole King voiced the title character and also wrote the music and sang all the songs.
- Andy Warhol's work Campbell's Soup Cans depicts five varieties of Campbell's soups: chicken noodle, chicken gumbo, cream of chicken, chicken with rice, and chicken vegetable.

== See also ==
- Chicken and dumplings
- Essence of chicken
- List of soups
- Poultry
