= Ícaro de Valmir =

Brazilian politician (born 2001)

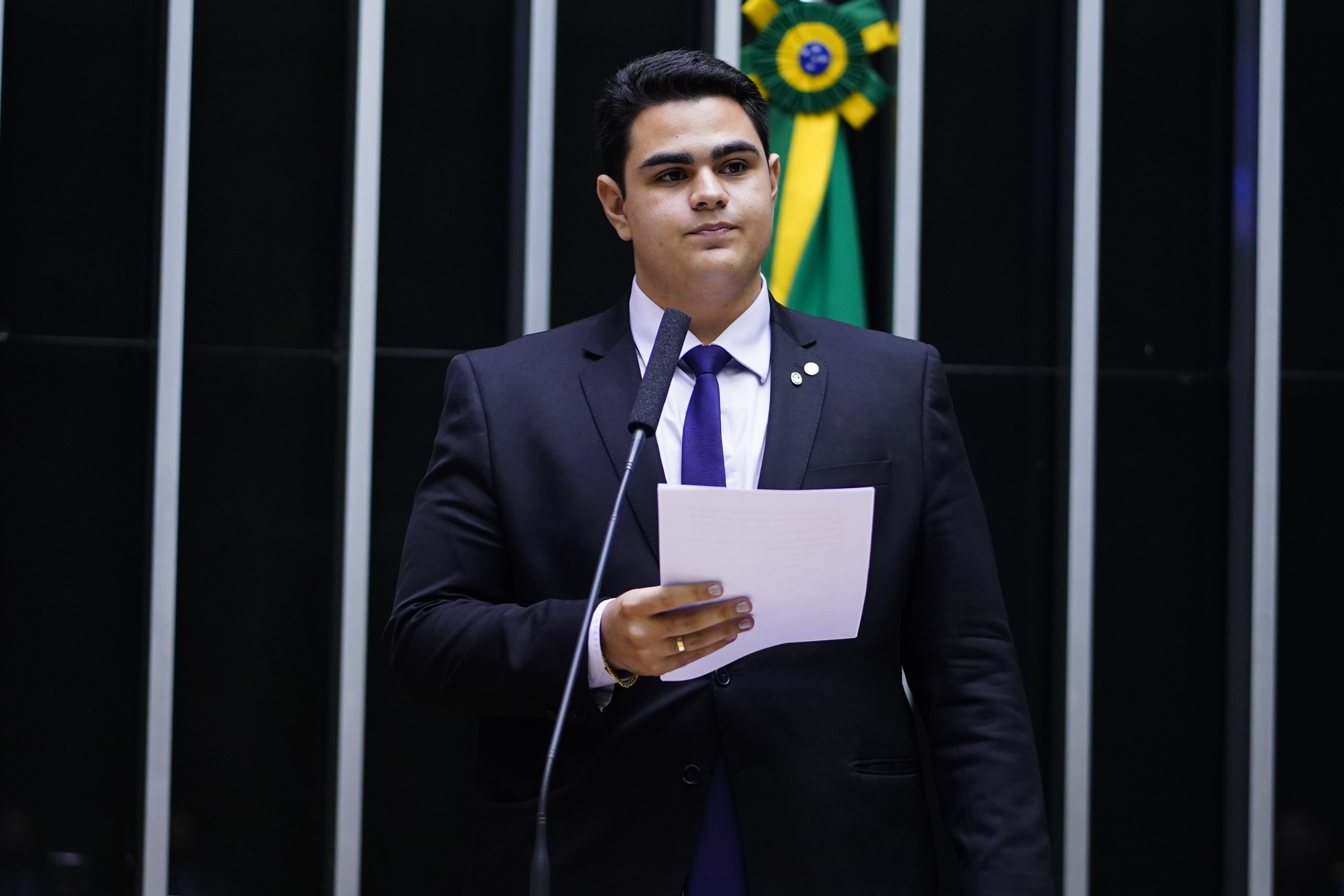

Member of the Chamber of Deputies
- Incumbent
- Assumed office 1 February 2023
- Constituency: Sergipe

Personal details
- Born: Ícaro Barbosa Costa; 10 April 2001 (age 25) Itabaiana, Sergipe, Brazil
- Party: Republicanos (since 2022)
- Other political affiliations: PL (until 2022)
- Relatives: Talysson de Valmir (brother)

Ícaro Barbosa Costa, better known as Ícaro de Valmir (born 10 April 2001), is a Brazilian politician serving as a member of the Chamber of Deputies since 2023. He is the youngest member of the Chamber.
