= Junco (village) =

- Village
- Location of Areia Branca in Sergipe

- Location within Brazil
- Coordinates: 10°47′8″S 37°22′37″W
- Country: Brazil
- State: Sergipe
- Municipality: Areia Branca
- Elevation: 214 m (702 ft)
- Population (2022): 1,346

Junco (Brazilian Portuguese pronunciation: [ˈʒʊnkʊ]) is a village in the municipality of Areia Branca, state of Sergipe, in northeastern Brazil. As of 2022 it had a population of 1346. It is named after the Portuguese word for the juncus plant.

== See also ==
- List of villages in Sergipe
