= Das Pedras River =

There are several rivers named Das Pedras River or Rio das Pedras:

== Brazil ==
- Das Pedras River (Bahia)
- Das Pedras River (Goiás)
- Das Pedras River (Anhumas River tributary), São Paulo
- Das Pedras River (Una da Aldeia River tributary), São Paulo
- Das Pedras River (Santa Catarina)

== See also ==
- Rio das Pedras (disambiguation)
