= Broth =

Ingredient in cooking

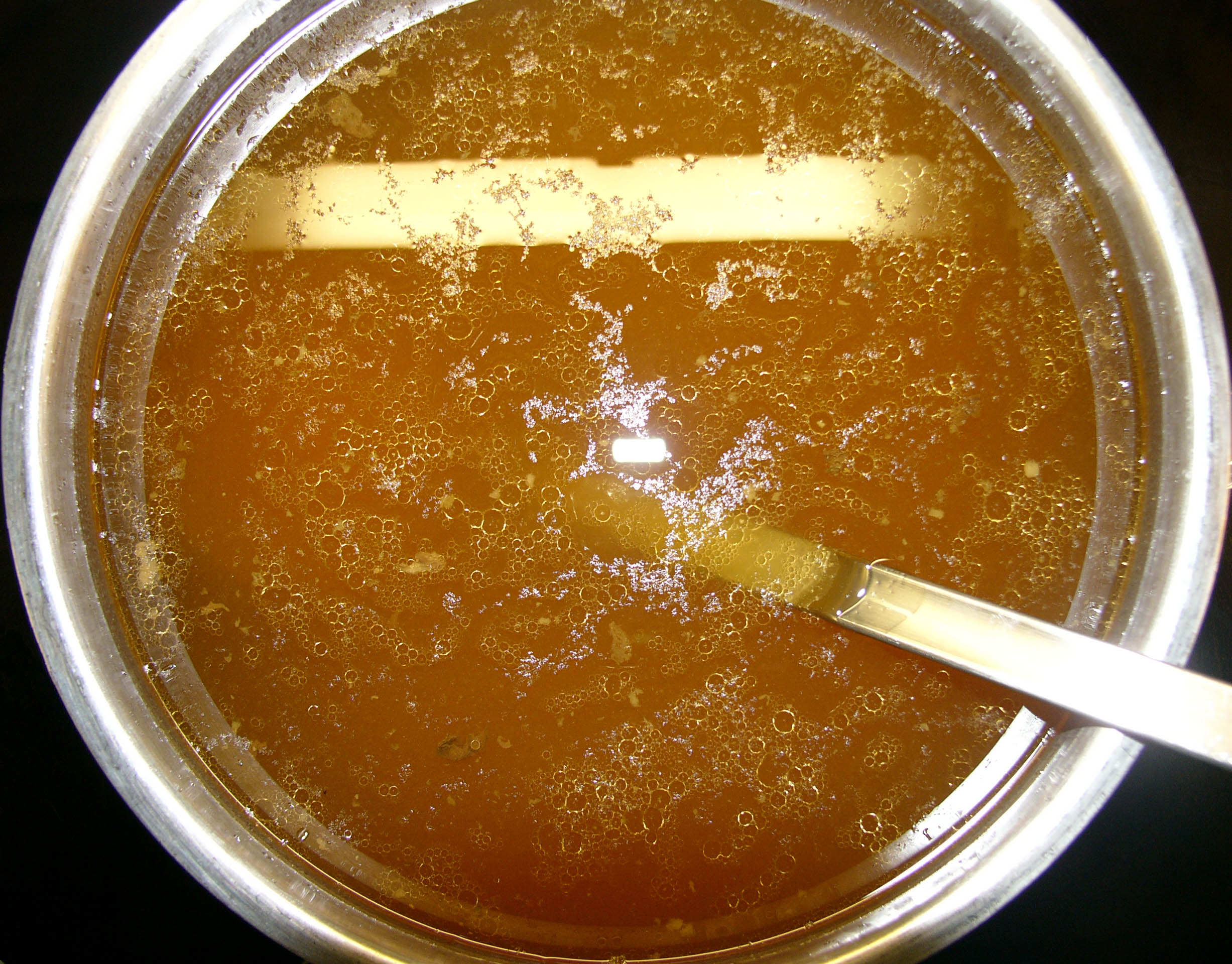
Broth prepared from meat and vegetables

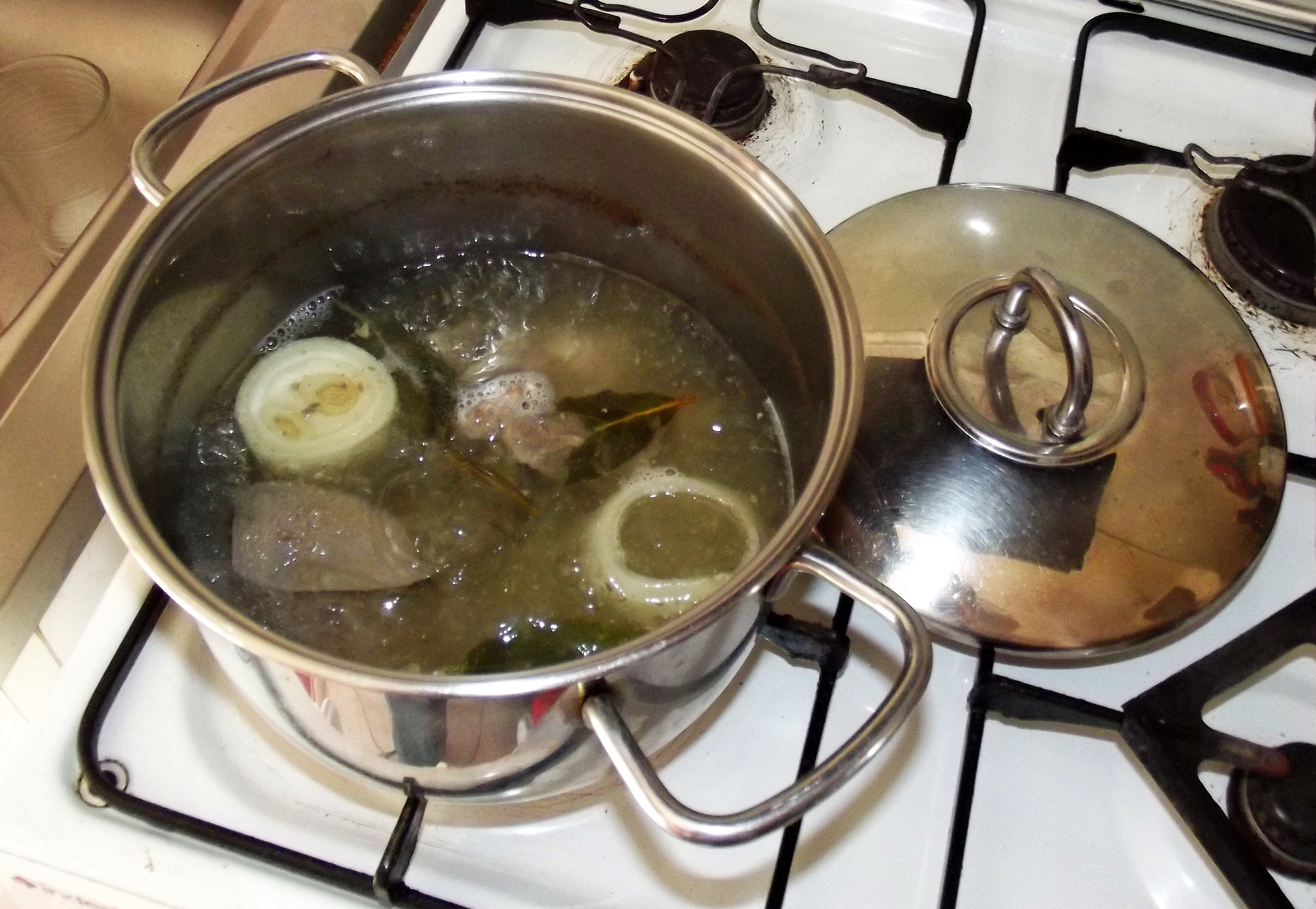
Beef broth being cooked

Broth, also known as bouillon (French pronunciation: [bujɔ̃]), is a savory liquid made of water in which meat, fish, or vegetables have been simmered for a period of time. It can be eaten alone, but it is most commonly used to prepare other dishes, such as soups, gravies, and sauces.

Commercially prepared liquid broths are available, typically chicken, beef, fish, and vegetable varieties. Dehydrated broth in the form of bouillon cubes was commercialized beginning in the early 20th century.

== Stock versus broth ==
Many cooks and food writers use the terms broth and stock interchangeably. In 1974, the American cook James Beard wrote that stock, broth, and bouillon "are all the same thing".

While many draw a distinction between stock and broth, the details of the distinction often differ. One possibility is that stocks are made primarily from animal bones, as opposed to meat, and therefore contain more gelatin, giving them a thicker texture. Another distinction that is sometimes made is that stock is cooked longer than broth and therefore has a more intense flavour. A third possible distinction is that stock is left unseasoned for use in other recipes, while broth is salted and otherwise seasoned and can be eaten alone.

== Similar dishes ==
Not every dish with the word broth in its name is, strictly speaking, a broth. For example, Aberaeron Broth is a Welsh soup. Scotch broth is a soup which includes solid pieces of meat and vegetables. Its name reflects an older usage of the term "broth" that did not distinguish between the complete soup and its liquid component. Similarly, Awara broth is a Guianan Creole stew from French Guiana.

Court-bouillon (French for "short broth") is a broth cooked for a short time, mostly used for poaching fish. Rosół is a category of clear Polish soups, primarily made of broth, with a popular version being similar to chicken noodle soup. Canja de galinha is a similar soup from Portuguese-speaking countries.
