= Talysson de Valmir =

Brazilian politician (born 1991)

Mayor of Areia Branca
- Incumbent
- Assumed office 1 January 2025

Personal details
- Born: 12 August 1991 (age 35)
- Party: Liberal Party
- Relatives: Ícaro de Valmir (brother)

Talysson Barbosa Costa, better known as Talysson de Valmir (born 12 August 1991), is a Brazilian politician serving as mayor of Areia Branca since 2025. He was a member of the Legislative Assembly of Sergipe in 2019 and 2022. He is the brother of Ícaro de Valmir.
