= Terra Dura =

- Village
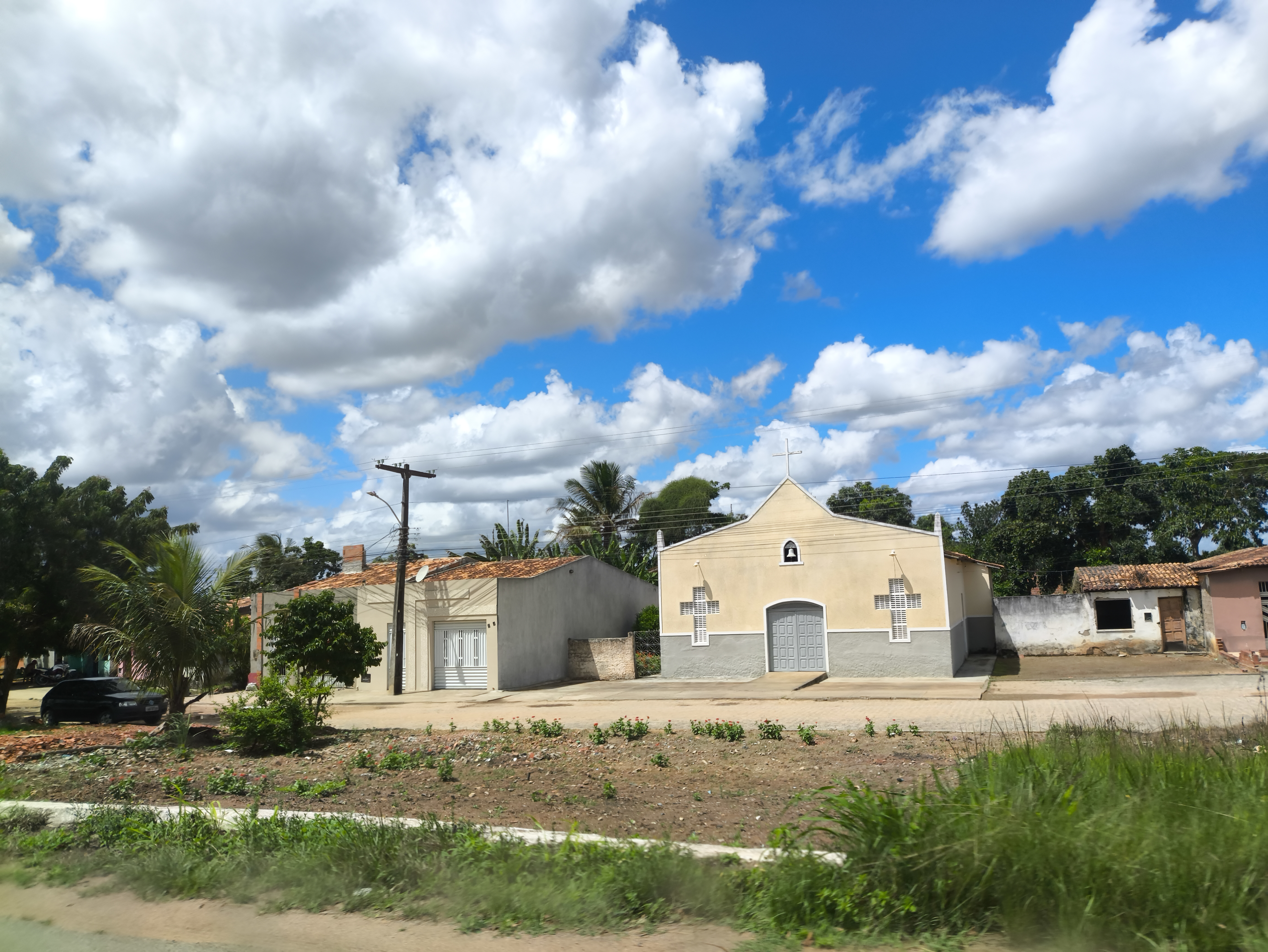

- Location of Itabaiana in Sergipe

- Location within Brazil
- Coordinates: 10°35′53″S 37°28′44″W
- Country: Brazil
- State: Sergipe
- Municipality: Itabaiana
- Elevation: 217 m (712 ft)
- Population (2022): 518

Terra Dura (Central northeastern portuguese pronunciation: [ˈtɛhɐ ˈduɾɐ]) is a village in the municipality of Itabaiana, state of Sergipe, in northeastern Brazil. As of 2022 it had a population of 518.

== See also ==
- List of villages in Sergipe
