= Rio das Pedras =

Rio das Pedras may refer to:

- Rio das Pedras, Rio de Janeiro, Brazil
- Rio das Pedras, São Paulo, Brazil, a municipality
- Rio das Pedras, Areia Branca, Brazil

== See also ==
- Das Pedras River (disambiguation)
