= Caldo de pollo =

Spanish soup of chicken and vegetables

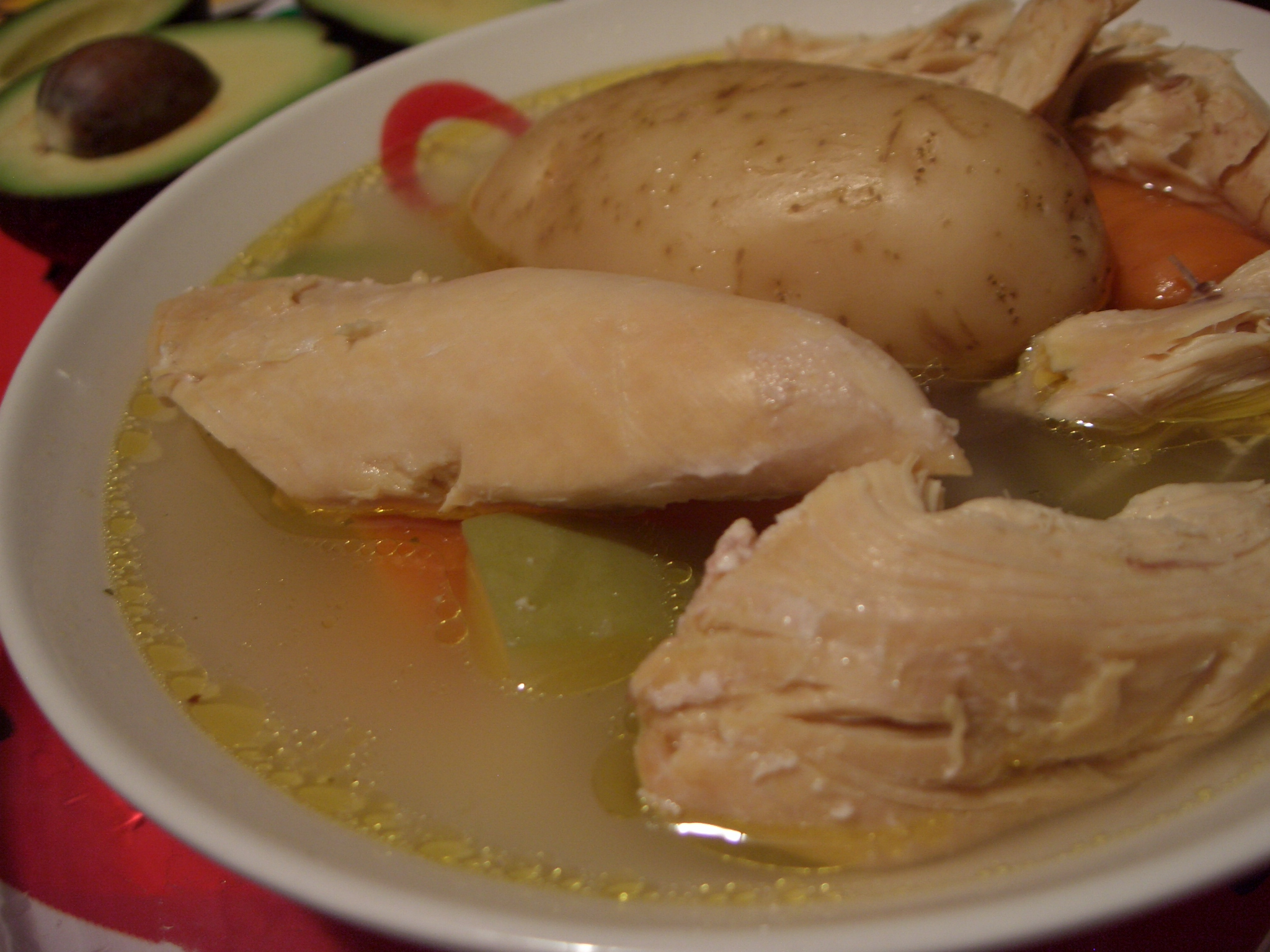
- Type: Soup
- Place of origin: Spanish
- Main ingredients: Chicken, vegetables, water

Caldo de pollo (Spanish pronunciation: [ˈkaldo ðe ˈpoʎo], lit. 'chicken broth') is a common soup that consists of chicken and vegetables.

What makes this soup different from many other versions of chicken soup is that unlike the Brazilian canja, caldo de pollo uses whole chicken pieces instead of chopped or shredded chicken. Other differences are that the vegetables are usually of a heartier cut. Potato halves, not cubes, are used, and whole leaves of cabbage are added.

A typical recipe for caldo de pollo will include the following: first garlic boiled in water, adding chicken pieces (drumsticks, breasts, thighs), sliced carrots, sliced chayote, sliced celery, potato halves, garbanzo beans, corn on the cob, diced tomato, sliced onion, minced cilantro, and cabbage.

While it is common to eat caldo de pollo plain, most add lemon juice or hot sauce. Some recipes call for cubed avocado added just before eating. Caldo de pollo can also be served with hot corn tortillas. In Mexico it is also common to add steamed or Mexican rice in the same bowl while serving, especially at fondas. In other Latin American countries, it is called sopa de pollo and not caldo, which means literally soup instead of broth.

Many Latin American countries, particularly Mexico, use this home-cooked meal during illness as a means to the healing of cold viruses, and after a woman gives birth, though in other cultures the recipe for this is significantly lighter than the traditional Mexican dish.

== See also ==
- Canja de galinha
- List of soups
