= Itabaiana =

Itabaiana、Sergipe
- Municipality
- The Municipality of Itabaiana
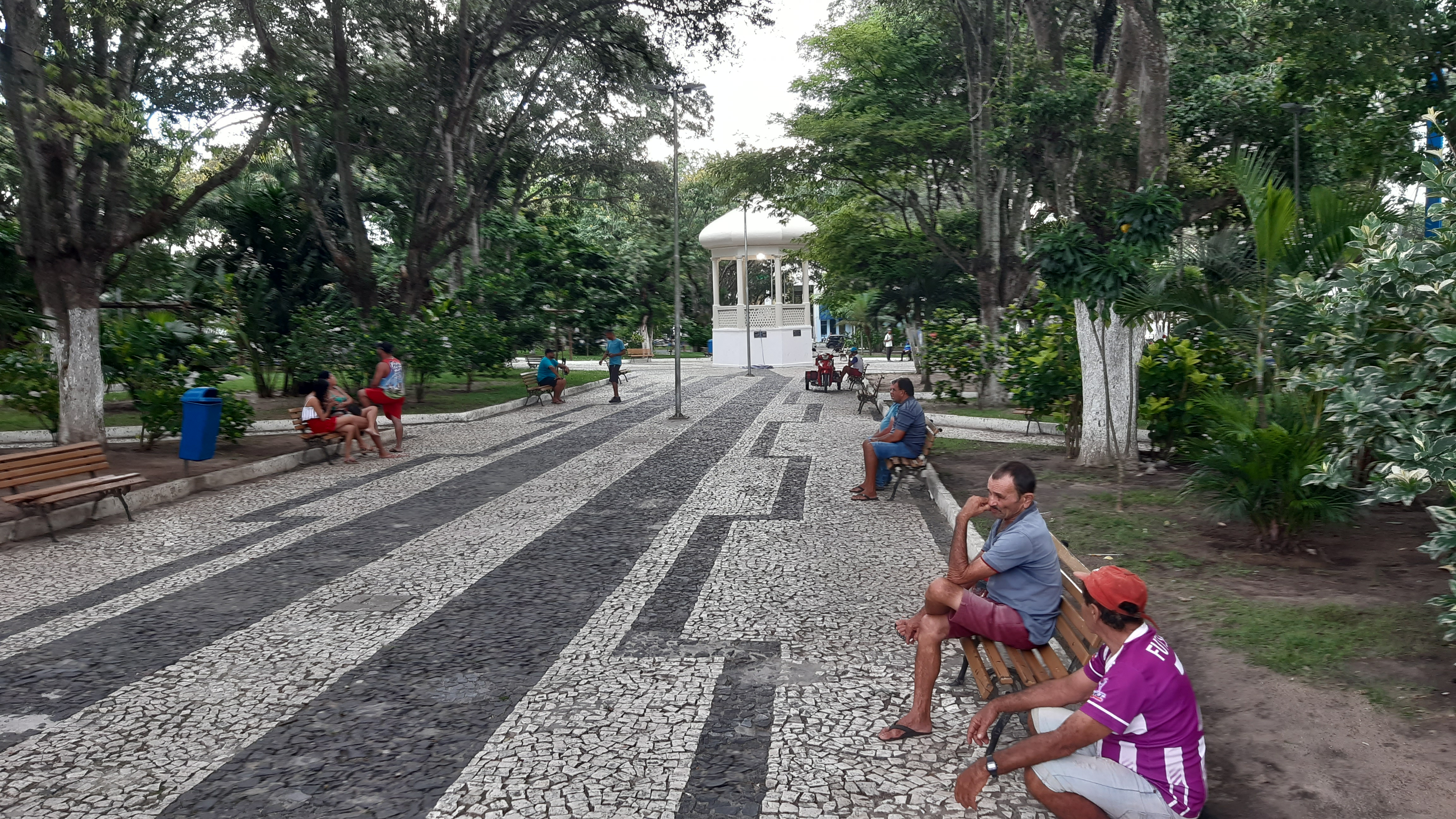
- Praça Fausto Cardoso (Fausto Cardoso Plaza) in the centre of the city

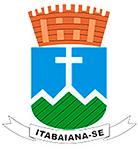
- Flag Coat of arms
- Nicknames: "Cidade Serrana", "Capital do Agreste", "Princesa da Serra" ("Ridge City", "Capital of the Agreste", "Princess of the Ridge")
- Location of Itabaiana, Sergipe

- Location in Brazil
- Coordinates: 10°41′06″S 37°25′30″W
- Country: Brazil
- State: Sergipe
- Mesoregion: Sergipe Agreste
- Microregion: Agreste de Itabaiana, Sergipe, Brasil
- Founded: 1675

Government
  - Mayor: José Paes dos Santos (BR)

Area
  - Total: 336.685 km^{2} (129.995 sq mi)
- Elevation: 7 m (23 ft)

Population (2022 Census)
  - Total: 103,440
  - Estimate (2025): 109,250
  - Density: 307.23/km^{2} (795.72/sq mi)
- Demonym: itabaianense
- Time zone: UTC−3 (BRT)

Itabaiana (Brazilian Portuguese pronunciation: [itabaˈjɐnɐ]) is a municipality located in the Brazilian state of Sergipe. Its population was 103,440 (2022 Census) and its area is 337.348 km^{2} (130.251 sq mi).

The municipality contains part of the Serra de Itabaiana National Park.

The city of Itabaiana has a museum of local history and art named the Museu Artístico E Histórico De Itabaiana, Antônio Nogueira.

== See also ==
- Itabaiana, Paraíba, another city with the same name, also in the Northeast Region of Brazil
- List of municipalities in Sergipe
