= Rio das Pedras, Areia Branca =

Rio das Pedras
- Village
- Location of Areia Branca in Sergipe

- Location within Brazil
- Coordinates: 10°46′20″S 37°22′36″W
- Country: Brazil
- State: Sergipe
- Municipality: Areia Branca
- Elevation: 213 m (699 ft)

Rio das Pedras (Brazilian Portuguese pronunciation: [ˈʁiʊ ˈdaɦ ˈpɛdɐ]) is a village in the municipality of Areia Branca, state of Sergipe, in northeastern Brazil. In Portuguese "rio das pedras" means "river of the stones".

== See also ==
- List of villages in Sergipe
