= Libertarian Party (Brazil) =

Political party in Brazil

Libertarian Party Partido Libertários
- Chairperson: André Rufino
- Founded: June 20, 2009; 16 years ago
- Headquarters: São Paulo; Brasília
- Ideology: Libertarianism; Anarcho-capitalism
- Political position: Right-wing
- International affiliation: Interlibertarians
- Colors: Yellow; Black

Website
- libertarios.org.br

The Libertarian Party (LIBER; Brazilian Portuguese: Partido Libertários) is a libertarian Brazilian political organization previously listed as a political party by the Superior Electoral Court (Portuguese: Tribunal Superior Eleitoral; TSE). The party was founded on June 20, 2009, in Belo Horizonte.

The concept of the Brazilian Libertarian Party first surfaced in 2005 among users of the Orkut social networking service. LIBER's program and statutes were published in the Federal Official Gazette in January 2010. The party has organized demonstrations on the Rio de Janeiro waterfront against the PNDH 3 bill, and have also participated in liberal forums and seminars, such as the Austrian Economy Seminar and the Liberdade e Democracia Forum in Belo Horizonte.

The Libertarians are affiliated with the Inter-libertarians, an international association of Libertarian parties and organizations. Because of its strong defense of a market economy with minimal state interference, the party has been associated with the new right. Although their stances on economic issues tend to lean right, on social issues libertarianism tends to be left-wing. Traditionally, libertarian theory is related to the classical liberal tradition, whose proponents include John Locke, David Hume, Adam Smith and Immanuel Kant.

== Ideology ==
The party promotes economic libertarianism, drawing inspiration from the Russian-American writer and philosopher Ayn Rand, the American economist Murray Rothbard, and the American philosopher Robert Nozick. It supports free-market policies and is ideologically informed by Austrian-British writer and philosopher Friedrich Hayek and Austrian-American economist and historian Ludwig von Mises. The party identifies with the Austrian School.

In an interview with Instituto Pais Melhor, the former president of LIBER Bernardo Santoro defined libertarianism as "a political philosophy based on individual sovereignty, non-initiation of aggression, and self-ownership." In this definition, a man is the owner of his body and mixes his work with nature, which creates a legal system with private property ownership and an economic system with a free market and free interaction between individuals."

== Registration process ==
The party is not registered with the Superior Electoral Court, as they do not have the required 500,000 supporters.

== Directories ==
Note: The following table is sorted alphabetically by state names.

Directory listing in June 2020
Directories
National	City	State	Address	Status
National	Brasília	DF	Facebook	Active
National	São Paulo	SP	Facebook	Active
Regional	Salvador	BA		Inactive
Regional	Fortaleza	CE		Inactive
Regional	Goiânia	GO		Inactive
Regional	São Luís	MA		Inactive
Regional	Campo Grande	MS	Facebook	Active
Regional	João Pessoa	PB		Inactive
Regional	Curitiba	PR		Inactive
Regional	Rio de Janeiro	RJ		Inactive
Regional	Natal	RN		Inactive
Regional	Florianópolis	SC		Inactive
Regional	São Paulo	SP		Active
Regional	Aracaju	SE		Active

== See also ==
- Anarcho-capitalism
- Freedom of speech in Brazil
- List of political parties in Brazil
- Minarchism
- Mission (political party)
