= Das Pedras River (Anhumas River tributary) =

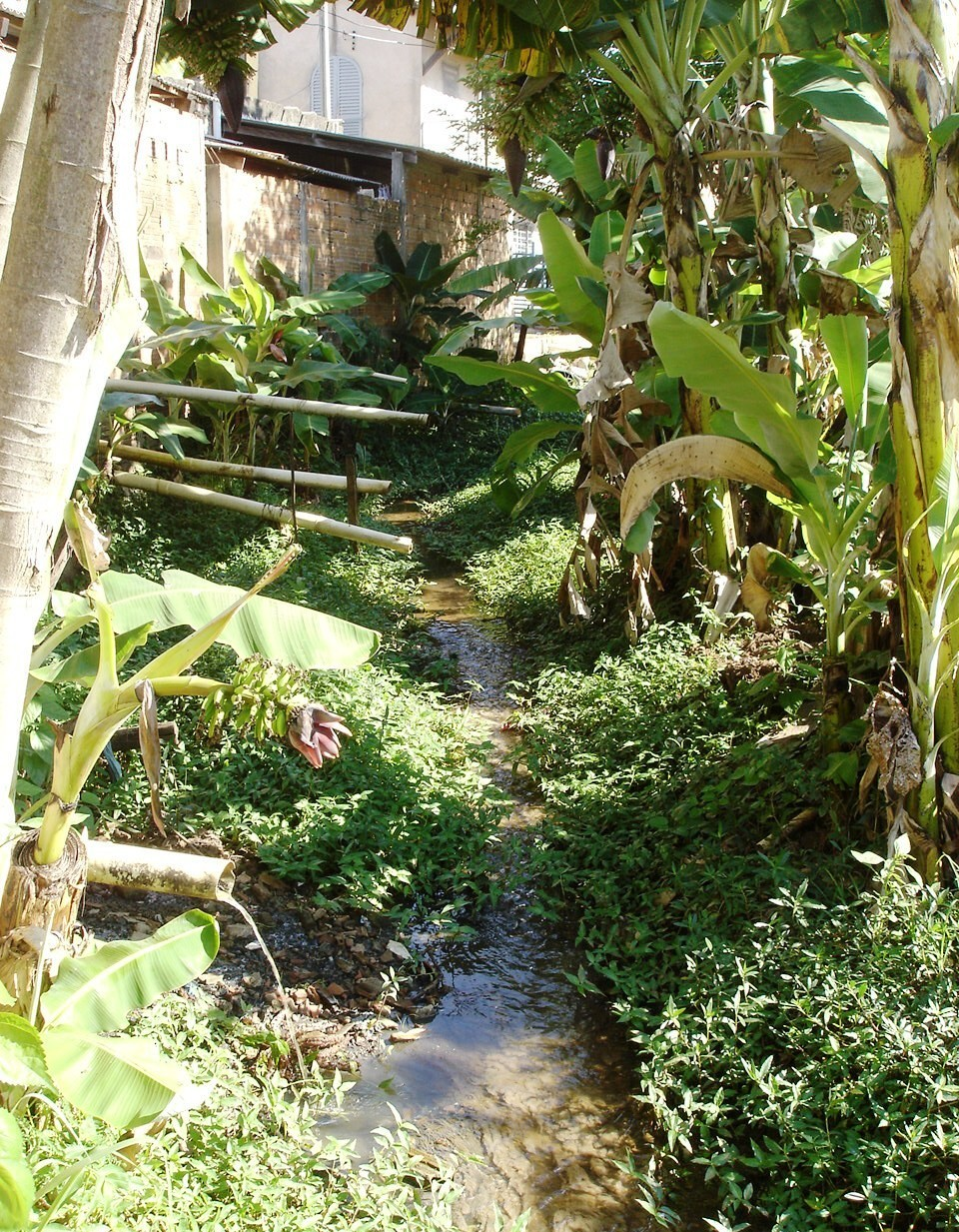

Location
- Country: Brazil

Physical characteristics
- Source
  - location: São Paulo state
- Mouth: Anhumas River
  - coordinates: 22°45′S 47°7′W

The Das Pedras River is a river of São Paulo state in southeastern Brazil. It is a tributary of the Anhumas River.

== See also ==
- List of rivers of São Paulo
