= Rosół =

Traditional Polish meat soup

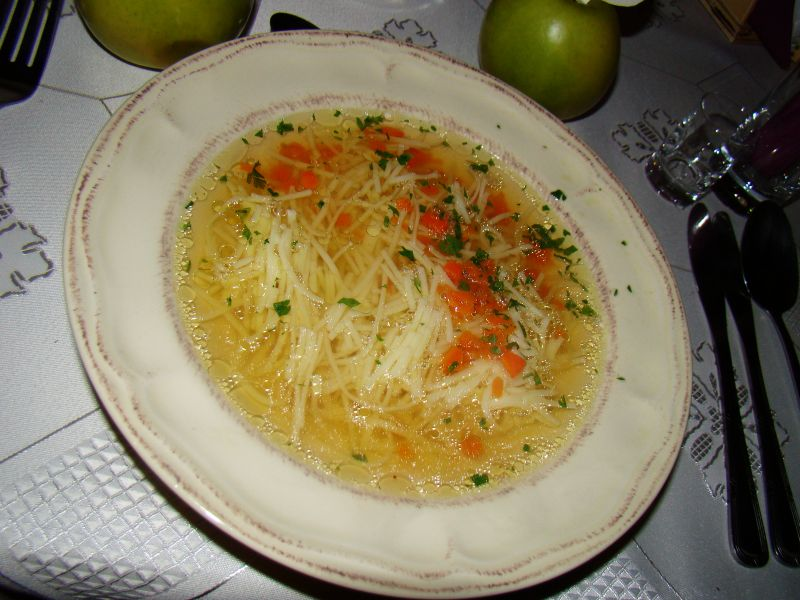
- Traditional rosół.
- Alternative names: Rosół z kury, rosół królewski, rosół myśliwski
- Course: Soup, entree
- Place of origin: Poland
- Associated cuisine: Polish
- Serving temperature: Hot
- Main ingredients: Chicken, noodle, broth

Rosół (Polish: [ˈrɔsuw]) is a traditional Polish soup based primarily on meat broth. Its most popular variety is the rosół z kury, or clear chicken soup. It is commonly served with capellini pasta (polish makaron nitki). A vegetarian version can be made, substituting meat with oil or butter.

It is one of the most popular Polish soups, served during family dinners and a traditional soup for weddings; it is also a traditional cold remedy. In the past it was a dish made of salted meat (an old conservation method) cooked in water to make it more edible. Later on, fresh meat was used instead. Over time the dish evolved to that of cooked meat in a soup that is commonly known today.

The name "rosół" derives from an Old Polish rozsół and rozsol, which is a description of desalting conserved meat (Polish sól, meaning salt).

There are many types of rosół, including:

- Rosół Królewski (royal rosół), made of three meats: beef or veal, white poultry (hen, turkey or chicken) and dark poultry, like duck or goose (crop only), just a couple of dried king boletes, one single cabbage leaf and a variety of vegetables such as włoszczyzna (parsnip, celeriac, carrot, and leek). The cooking must take at least six hours of slow boiling over a small fire. At the end, a lightly burnt onion is added to the soup.
- Rosół myśliwski (hunter's rosół) is made of a variety of wild birds as well as pheasant, capercaillie, wood grouse, black grouse, or grey partridge, with a small addition of roe deer meat, a couple of wild mushrooms, and 2–3 juniper fruits. Instead of wild poultry, helmeted guinea fowl can also be used.

The most important thing about making rosół is that there can be no addition of pork, since that would no longer make the broth clear. It cannot be boiled too quickly for the same reason.
