= Campo do Brito =

Municipality in Sergipe, Brazil

Coordinates: 10°43′58″S 37°29′34″W

- Municipality
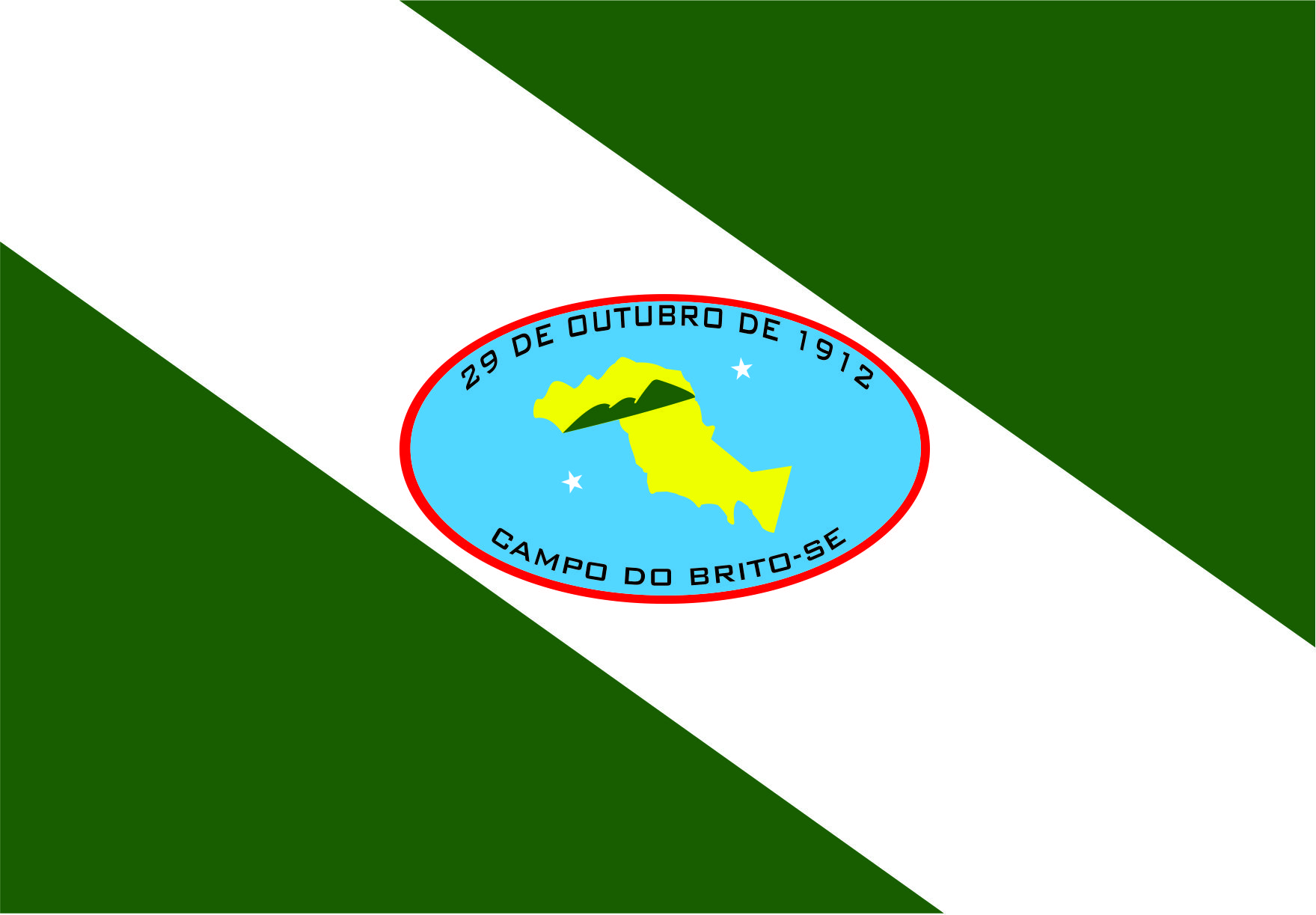
- Flag Coat of arms
- Interactive map of Campo do Brito
- Country: Brazil
- Time zone: UTC−3 (BRT)

Campo do Brito (Brazilian Portuguese pronunciation: [ˈkɐ̃pu du ˈbɾitu]) is a municipality in the Brazilian state of Sergipe.

Campo do Brito has a population of 18,218 (2020) and covers an area of 202 square kilometres (78 sq mi). The municipality contains part of the Serra de Itabaiana National Park.

== See also ==
- List of municipalities in Sergipe
