= Eyerlekh =

Unlaid eggs found inside just-slaughtered chickens

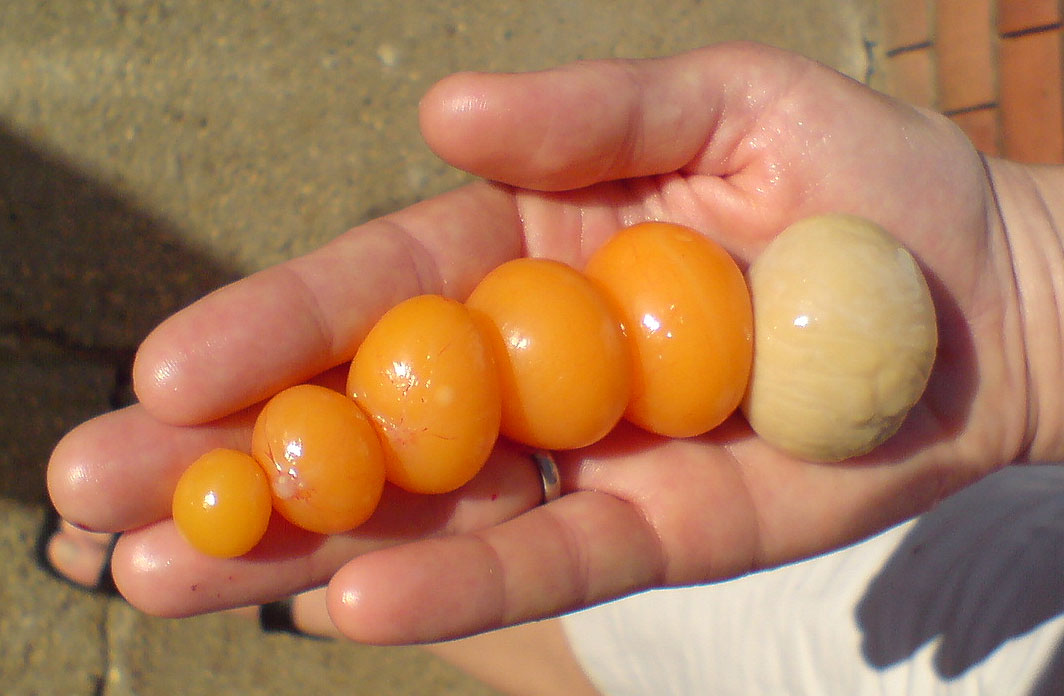
The first five orange chicken unlaid eggs in the image, from left to right, are the types of eggs referred to as Eyerlekh

Eyerlekh (Yiddish: אייערלעך, "little eggs") are unlaid eggs found inside just-slaughtered chickens, and typically cooked in soup. They were historically common in Ashkenazi Jewish cuisine, but their usage has become much less frequent with the rise of prepackaged chicken parts.

In kashrut meal preparation, laid eggs are considered pareve, while unlaid eggs are generally considered meat (fleishig). Because of this, eyerlekh was traditionally served with meat meals rather than dairy meals. According to the Shulchan Aruch (Yoreh De'ah 87:5), unlaid eggs are pareve only if fully formed, while unlaid eggs that are not fully formed are considered meat and may not be consumed with dairy products. However, dairy products can be consumed after eating partially formed eggs.
