= Freedom of speech in Brazil =

Overview of freedom of expression in Brazil

The freedom of expression in Brazil is protected by section IV and XII of Article 5 of the country's Constitution. Freedom of expression is not absolute. A July 2026 article in The Economist described Brazil's anti-racism laws as "the strictest in the world."

== Article 5 ==
Article 5 of the Constitution of Brazil encodes freedom of speech as a constitutional right. The Article was approved along with the Constitution of Brazil in 1988.

Article 5: All are equal before the law, without distinction whatsoever, guaranteeing Brazilians and foreigners residing in the country the inviolable right to life, liberty, equality, security and property, as follows:
[...]
IV – the expression of thought is free, anonymity being forbidden;
[...]
IX - are free the expression of intellectual, artistic, scientific and communication, regardless of censorship or license;

== Types of speech restrictions ==
There are several different types of laws that restrict speech.

=== Moral harassment ===
When the individual has their dignity shaken through continuous and repetitive depreciation of their self-esteem, it qualifies as moral harassment. Causing judicial proceeding and may be punishable by monetary compensation.

=== Hate Speech ===
Hate Speech is not considered freedom of speech. Causing arrest.

=== Bullying ===
Bullying is not considered freedom of speech. Causing judicial proceeding and may be punishable by monetary compensation.

== Crimes in the Penal Code ==
There are several articles of the Brazilian Penal Code that restrict freedom of speech defining some speeches as a crime.

=== Inducement, instigation or assistance to suicide ===
Article 122 - Causing or inciting a person to commit suicide or provide them assistance to do so:
Penalty - imprisonment from two to six years if the suicide is consummated; or imprisonment of one to three years if the suicide attempt resulting bodily injury of a serious nature.

Single Paragraph - The penalty is doubled:
I - if the crime is committed by selfish motive;
II - if the victim is a minor or has diminished, for any reason, capacity of resistance.

=== Slander ===
Article 138 - Slandering someone, charging them falsely with a fact defined as a crime:
Penalty - imprisonment from six months to two years and fine.

§ 1 - The same penalty applies to those who knowingly propagate or publish the falsehood.

§ 2 - Is punishable, slander against the dead.

§ 3 - It is recognized proof of the truth, unless:
I - if the offended has not been convicted by a final judgment;
II - the fact is attributed to any of the persons mentioned in item I of Article 141;
III - if the offended was acquitted by a final sentence.

=== Defamation ===
Article 139 - Defaming someone, charging them of fact offensive to his reputation:
Penalty - imprisonment of three (3) months to one (1) year and a fine.
Single Paragraph - The exception of truth only is allowed if the offended is a public official and the offense is on the exercise of their functions.

=== Injury ===
Article 140 - Insulting someone, offending his dignity or decorum:
Penalty - detention of one to six months, or a fine.

§ 1 - The court may forego applying the pen:
I - when the offended, the reprehensible manner, directly caused the injury;
II - for immediate retaliation, consisting of another injury.

§ 2 - If the injury is to violence or blows, which, by their nature or the means employed, if they consider demeaning:
Penalty - imprisonment from three months to one year and a fine addition to the penalty corresponding to violence.

§ 3 - If the injury is to use elements of race, color, ethnicity, religion, origin or condition of elderly or disabled person:
Penalty - imprisonment of one to three years and fine.

=== Threat ===
Article 147 - Threatening someone, by word, writing or gesture, or any other symbolic medium, to cause them harm unjust and severe:
Penalty - detention of one to six months, or a fine.

=== Outrage of worship and impediment or disruption of the act relating to it ===
Article 208 - Mocking someone publicly, by reason of belief or religious function; impede or disturb ceremony or practice of religious worship; publicly vilify material act or object of religious worship:
Penalty - detention of one month to one year or a fine.
Single Paragraph - If there is use of violence, the penalty is increased by one third, without prejudice to the corresponding violence.

=== Incitement to crime ===
Article 286 - Inciting publicly the practice of crime:
Penalty - detention of three to six months or a fine.

=== Apology of crime or criminal ===
Article 287 - Making publicly, praise or justification of criminal act or crime author:
Penalty - detention of three to six months or a fine.

=== Contempt ===
Article 331 - Insulting a public official on the job or by reason of their duties:
Penalty - detention of six months to two years or a fine.

=== Slanderous denunciation ===
Article 339 - To cause police investigation, court proceedings, administrative investigation, civil investigation or action administrative impropriety against someone, charging them with a crime knowing they are innocent:
Penalty - imprisonment of two to eight years and a fine.

§ 1 - The penalty is increased by the sixth part, if the agent makes use of anonymous or assumed name.

§ 2 - The penalty is reduced by half if the charge is the practice of misdemeanor.

=== False reporting of a crime or misdemeanor ===
Article 340 - Provoking the action of an authority, informing it of the occurrence of crime or misdemeanor, knowing it did not occur:
Penalty - detention of one to six months or a fine.

=== False self-accusation ===
Article 341 - Self-accuse, to the authorities of non-existent crime or practiced by others:
Penalty - detention of three months to two years or a fine.

=== Increase of penalty for slander, defamation and injury ===
There are specific causes of increased punishment for slander, defamation, injury.

Article 141 - The penalties prescribed in this chapter is increased by one third if any crime is committed:
I - against the President or against the head of government, foreign;
II - against a public official by reason of their duties;
III - in the presence of several people, or by facilitating the dissemination of slander, defamation or injury;
IV - against a person over sixty (60) years old or disabled, except in case of injury.
Single paragraph. If crime is committed through payment or promise of reward, applies to pen double.

=== Not punishable exceptions for injury or defamation ===
Article 142 - [The following provisions] Do not constitute punishable injury or defamation:
I - the offense made in court, during the discussion, by the defendant or his attorney;
II - the unfavorable opinion of literary, artistic or scientific criticism, unless there is the intention to insult or slander;
III - the unfavorable concept issued by a public official in the performance of duty.
Single Paragraph - In the case of sections I and III, is punishable by slander or defamation who gives you advertising.

=== Retraction for libel or defamation ===
Article 143 - The accused before conviction, apologizing fully for the libel or defamation, is free from penalty.
Single paragraph. Where the defendant has committed slander or defamation using media, the retraction will be given, if desired, by the same means in which it is practiced offense.

== Crimes in anti-racism law ==
Article 20 - Practice, induce or incite discrimination or prejudice based on race, color, ethnicity, religion or national origin.
Penalty: imprisonment for one to three years and fine.

§ 1 Manufacturing, selling, distributing or using symbols, emblems, ornaments, badges or advertising using the swastika for the Nazi disclosure purposes.
Penalty: imprisonment for two to five years and fine.

§ 2 If any of the crimes provided for in the caput is committed through the media or publication of any kind:
Penalty: imprisonment for two to five years and fine.

=== Sexual orientation and gender identity ===
On 13 February 2019, the Supreme Federal Court ruled, by a vote of 8–3, that discrimination based on sexual orientation and gender identity can be punished under the anti-racism law until the National Congress passes legislation on the matter.

== Crimes in the anti-discrimination law to HIV positive ==
Article 1 - It is a crime, punishable by imprisonment of one (1) to four (4) years and a fine, the following discriminatory behavior against HIV positive and AIDS patients, because of their carrier status or ill:
[...]
V - to disclose HIV-positive status, in order to offend his dignity;
[...]
