= Fausto Cardoso =

Fausto de Aguiar Cardoso
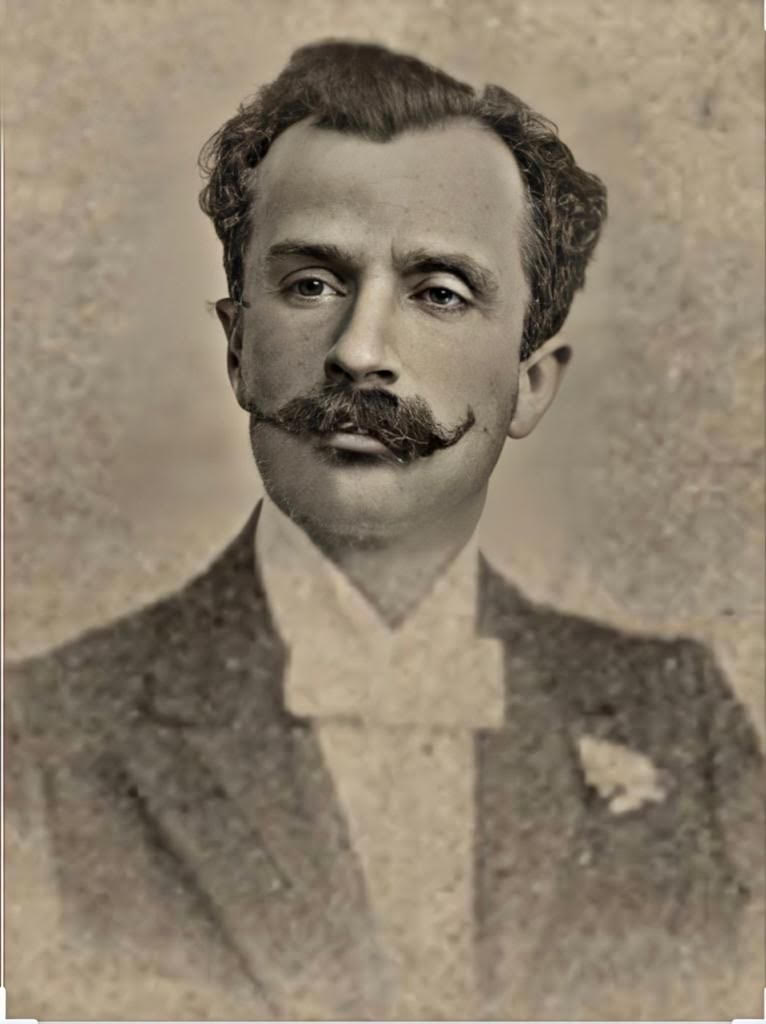
- Born: Fausto de Aguiar Cardoso; 22 December 1864; Divina Pastora, Sergipe, Brazil
- Died: 28 July 1906 (aged 41); Aracaju, Sergipe, Brazil
- Education: Faculty of Law of Recife
- Occupations: Lawyer, poet, philosopher, and politician

Fausto de Aguiar Cardoso (December 22, 1864 – August 28, 1906) was a Brazilian lawyer, poet, philosopher, and politician from the state of Sergipe. He was born in a rural part of the state Sergipe, and studied at the Faculty of Law of Recife in Pernambuco. He was elected to political office in 1900, and came into dispute with Olímpio Campos in Rio de Janeiro, the seat of the First Brazilian Republic. Cardoso returned to Sergipe in 1906 and led a revolt against the state government. He was assassinated in 1906 by federal troops summoned to the state by Olímpio Campos. Cardoso's sons, in turn, avenged their father's death and murdered Olímpio Campos shortly after in Rio de Janeiro.

== Early life and career ==
Fausto Cardoso was born in Sergipe on Engenho São Félix, a plantation in present-day Divina Pastora. Cardoso completed preparatory school in Sergipe, and secondary school at Colégio Sete de Setembro in Salvador, Bahia. He entered the Faculty of Law of Recife in Pernambuco in 1880. He became a disciple of Tobias Barreto (1839-1889), a poet and literary critic, also of Sergipe. He became a member of the Movement for the Renewal of National Thought (Movimento de Renovação do Pensamento Nacional). Cardoso wrote for newspapers in Recife and became an editor of the newspaper Saara.

Cardoso returned to Sergipe after graduation from law school in Recife. He became a public prosecutor first in Capela and later in Laranjeiras. Cardoso witnessed the strength of the growing republican movement in Laranjeiras that foreshadowed the end of the Empire of Brazil in 1889. He fell out of favor with local politicians in Sergipe due to his support of republican ideals, and moved to Rio de Janeiro. He worked as a law professor, journalist, and professor. Cardoso wrote Concepção Monistica do Universo, a book on philosophy, and later "Taxonomia Social", on social science in this period. He additionally published numerous articles on history and law.

== Political career ==
Cardoso and Sílvio Romero supported Colonel Manuel Prisciliano de Oliveira Valadão, who was running for a seat in the Senate from Sergipe in 1894; Valadão's investiture was approved by President Floriano Peixoto. The candidacy was declared illegal and created discontent, resulting in the shortening of the Constitutional Government presided over by José Calazans. The dispute led to the creation of two groups: the Pebas, which represented the elites of Aracaju; and the Cabaús, which represented the elites of the rural sugarcane region, and favored José Calazans. The dispute lasted for much of the 1890s.

Fausto Cardoso was elected Federal Deputy for Sergipe for two terms, once in 1900-1902 and again in 1906-1908. He became involved in the political group of Monsignor Olímpio Campos, but soon became his opponent and rival. Cardoso returned to Sergipe in 1906 and formed a political party, the Progressive Party (Portuguese: Partido Progressista, PP). The followers of Fausto Cardoso and the Military Police took over the Government Palace, invaded the Legislative Assembly, and impeached several deputies. They deposed the state president, Guilherme de Campos, brother of Olímpio Campos. The Campos brothers notified the Brazilian federal government about the illegality of the movement, which became known as "Revolt of Fausto Cardoso" or the "Tragedy of Sergipe".

== Death in Aracaju ==
Monsignor Olímpio Campos, as Senator for Sergipe, petitioned President Rodrigues Alves to send army troops from Bahia and Pernambuco to Aracaju. Fausto Cardoso went to the Government Palace unarmed, to appeal to the federal army troops on August 28, 1906. They shot him and two others with rifle and shotgun fire after his speech. Cardoso asked for water after the shooting at a house at on the corner of Rua de Pacatuba on Praça do Palácio, a broad public plaza, and died. Fausto Cardoso's sons, Armando de Aguiar Cardoso and Humberto de Aguiar Cardos, avenged their father's death; they murdered Olímpio Campos three months later in Rio de Janeiro.

Fausto Cardoso and Olímpio Campos are commemorated with broad public squares in the Historic Center of Aracaju, with Praça Fausto Cardoso located on the margins of the Sergipe River.
