= Serra de Itabaiana National Park =

National park in Sergipe, Brazil

- Parque Nacional Serra de Itabaiana
- IUCN category II (national park)
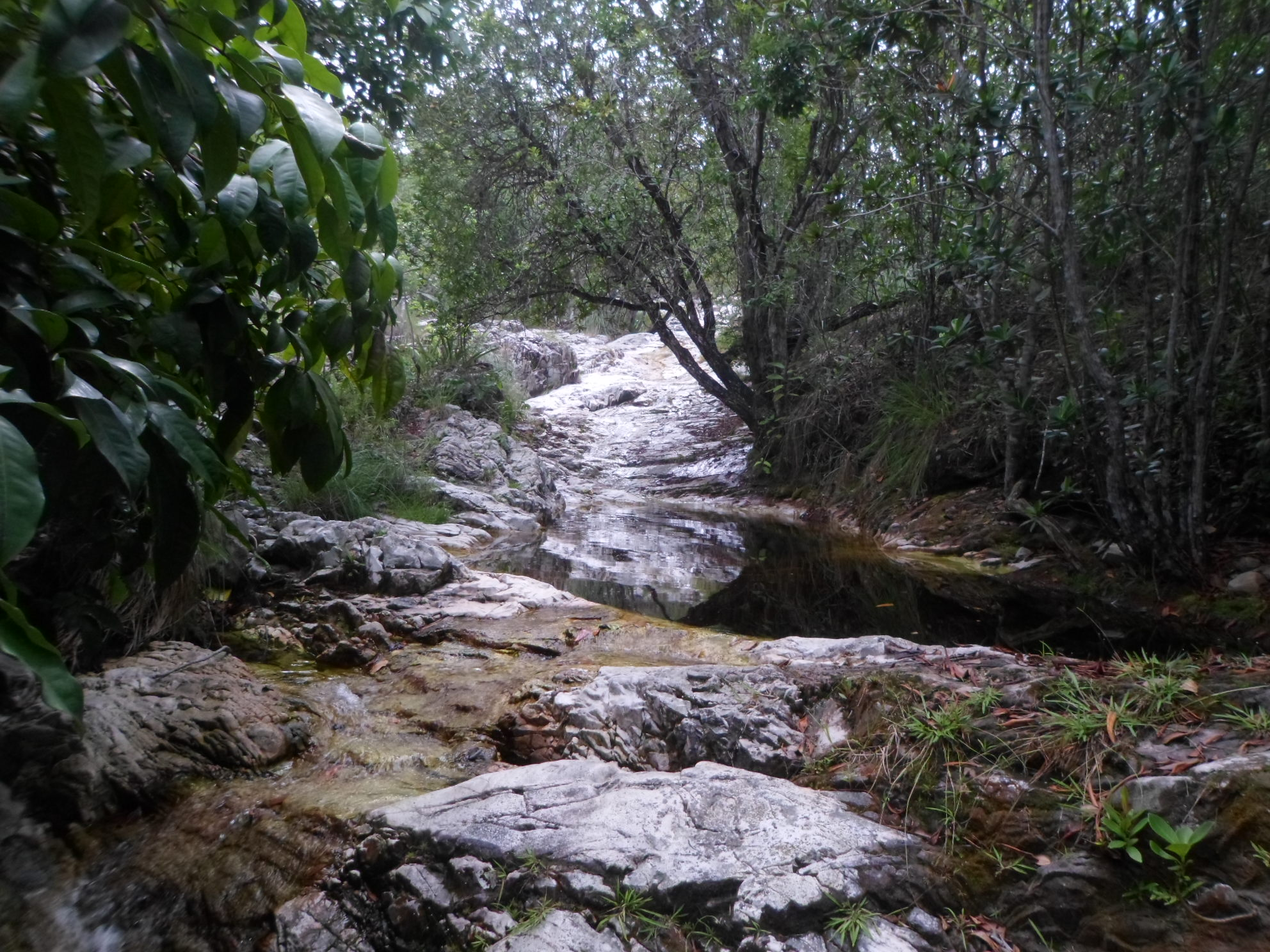

- Location within Brazil
- Nearest city: Itabaiana, Sergipe
- Coordinates: 10°46′44″S 37°20′56″W
- Area: 7,999 hectares (19,770 acres)
- Designation: National park
- Created: 15 June 2005
- Administrator: ICMBio

Serra de Itabaiana National Park (Portuguese: Parque Nacional Serra de Itabaiana) is a national park in the state of Sergipe, Brazil.

== Location ==
The park lies in the Atlantic Forest biome, and covers 7,999 hectares (19,770 acres). It was created on 15 June 2005, and is administered by the Chico Mendes Institute for Biodiversity Conservation. The park covers parts of the Areia Branca, Campo do Brito, Itabaiana, Itaporanga d'Ajuda, Laranjeiras and Malhador municipalities of the state of Sergipe.

== Conservation ==
The park is classified as IUCN protected area category II (national park). It has the objectives of preserving natural ecosystems of great ecological relevance and scenic beauty, enabling scientific research, environmental education, outdoors recreation and eco-tourism.

The lizard Cnemidophorus abaetensis is a protected species found in the park.

== Sources ==
- Parna Serra de Itabaiana (in Portuguese), Chico Mendes Institute for Biodiversity Conservation, archived from the original on 2016-03-03
- Unidade de Conservação: Parque Nacional da Serra de Itabaiana (in Portuguese), MMA: Ministério do Meio Ambiente
