= Canja de galinha =

Type of chicken soup

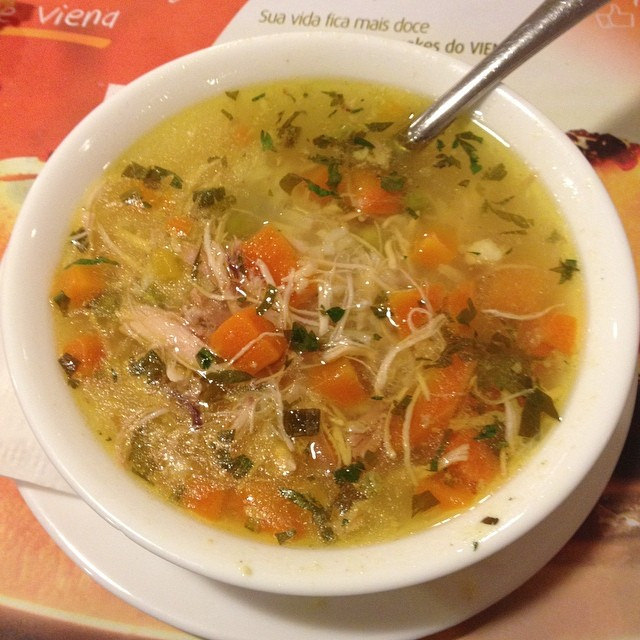
- Alternative names: Canja
- Type: Chicken soup
- Course: Entrée or supper
- Main ingredients: chicken, rice or massa pevide

Canja de galinha (European Portuguese pronunciation: [kɐ̃ʒɐ ðɨ ɣɐˈlĩɲɐ], Brazilian Portuguese pronunciation: [kɐ̃ʒɐ dʒi gaˈlĩj̃ɐ], (literally "chicken congee"), or simply canja, is a popular chicken soup of Portuguese, Cape Verdean, and Brazilian cuisine. The Portuguese term galinha literally means "hen", but became the generic name for the species, much like chicken in English. Portuguese chicken congee has the rice much more cooked than in most Western chicken soup recipes, but it is not disintegrated as in the Asian one.

== General recipe ==
=== Portugal ===
The basic ingredients include chicken, and usually small pasta (like alphabet pasta or pevide pasta) or sometimes rice. Common flavoring ingredients are carrot, eggs, olive oil, mint, saffron, clove, white pepper, salt and pepper. It is usually accompanied by slices of Portuguese broa bread (corn bread) on the side for dipping. This is only a variation of this recipe.

=== Brazil ===
The Brazilian recipe for canja de galinha uses whole pieces of chicken from the areas with more bones, fried in a very light refogado using a sole smashed garlic clove (fried in olive oil until golden but never toasted), has the rice and vegetables (generally solely potato and carrots, in very small cubes; rarely peeled tomato) boiled in broth much more cooked than the usual, and might call for parsley and green onions. Generally, no seasoning is used besides the light use of salt, sauteed garlic and onion (added before the boiling process), black pepper, parsley and green onion.

== Customs ==
Canja de galinha is usually consumed by Brazilians, Portuguese and Cape Verdeans when they have a cold. In Portugal, Cape Verde and Brazil, canja de galinha is widely believed to help a person overcome colds, digestive problems, and other mild forms of sickness. In Cape Verde, canja is sometimes served after the funeral, at the home of the deceased, perhaps because it "soothes" the heart. It is also served in that country during special occasions, such as New Year's Eve, birthdays, and other special family events.

Since canja de galinha is very simple and light, it is often consumed before a main course meal as well as a late supper.

== See also ==
- Caldo de pollo, canja's much "heavier" Hispanic American relative
- List of soups
