= Areia Branca, Sergipe =

Municipality in Sergipe, Brazil

Areia Branca Município de Areia Branca
- Municipality
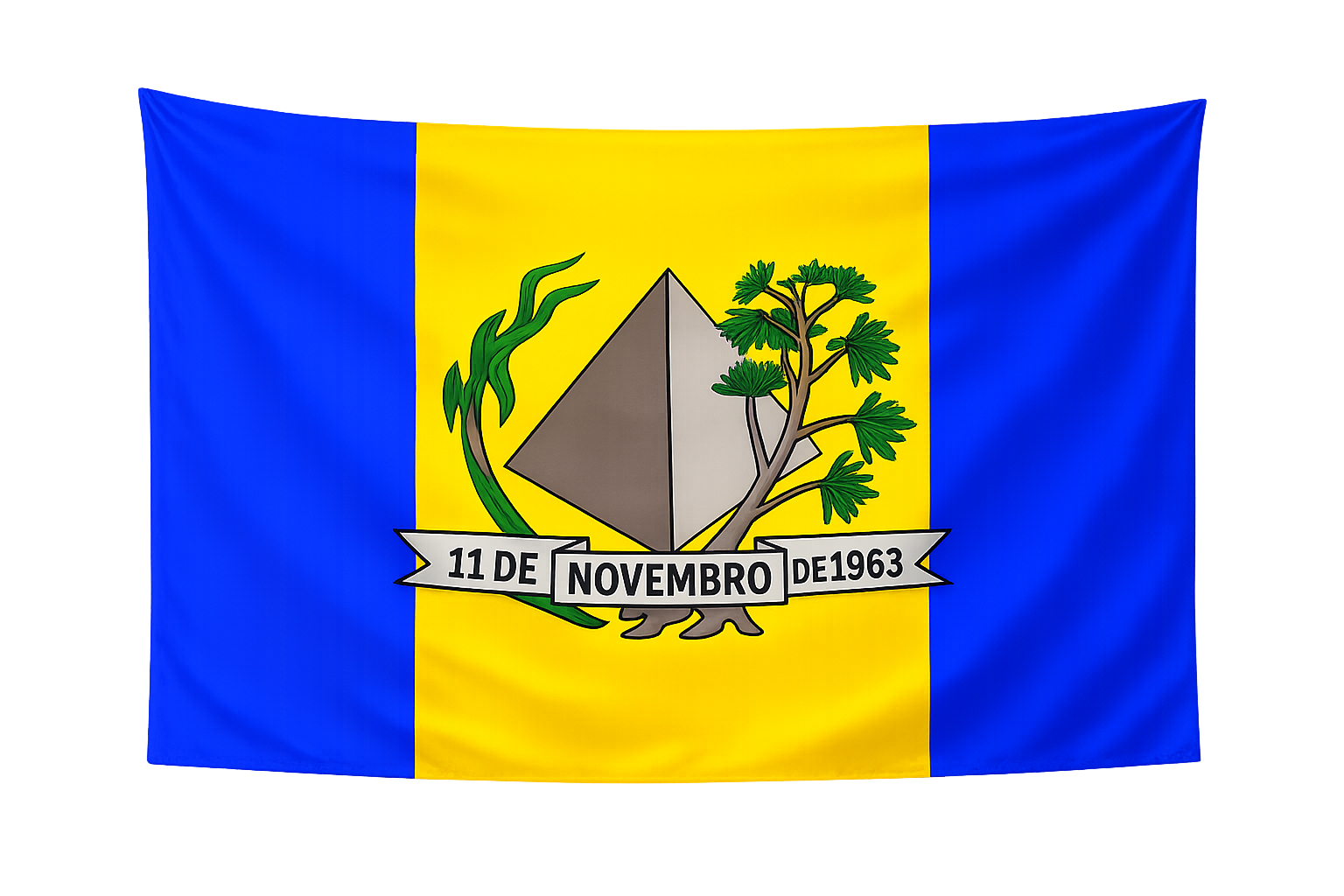
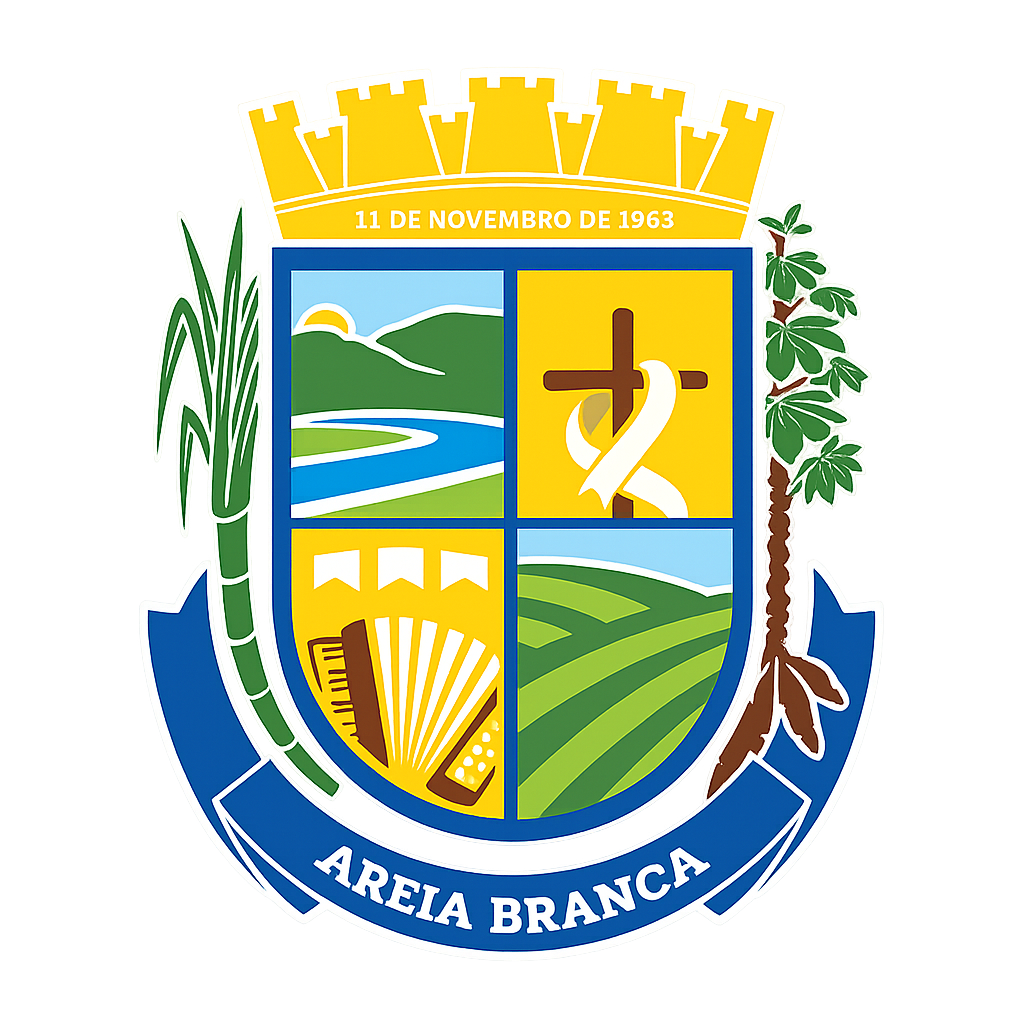
- Flag Coat of arms

- Location of Areia Branca in Sergipe

- Location of Areia Branca in Brazil
- Coordinates: 10°45′28″S 37°18′54″W
- Country: Brazil
- Region: Northeast
- State: Sergipe
- Founded: November 11, 1963

Government
  - Mayor: Agripino Andrelino Santos

Area
  - Total: 148.13 km^{2} (57.19 sq mi)
- Elevation: 193 m (633 ft)

Population (2020)
  - Total: 18,686
  - Density: 126.15/km^{2} (326.72/sq mi)
- Demonym: Areia-branquense
- Time zone: UTC−3 (BRT)
- Website: areiabranca.se.gov.br

Areia Branca (Brazilian Portuguese pronunciation: [aˈɾejɐ ˈbɾɐ̃kɐ], transl. White Sand) is a municipality located in the Brazilian state of Sergipe. Its population was 18,686 (2020) and it covers 148.13 km^{2} (57.19 mi^{2}). Areia Branca has a population density of 120 inhabitants per square kilometer. It is located 36 km (22 mi) from the state capital of Sergipe, Aracaju. The municipality contains part of the Serra de Itabaiana National Park.

== See also ==
- List of municipalities in Sergipe
