= List of kosher restaurants =

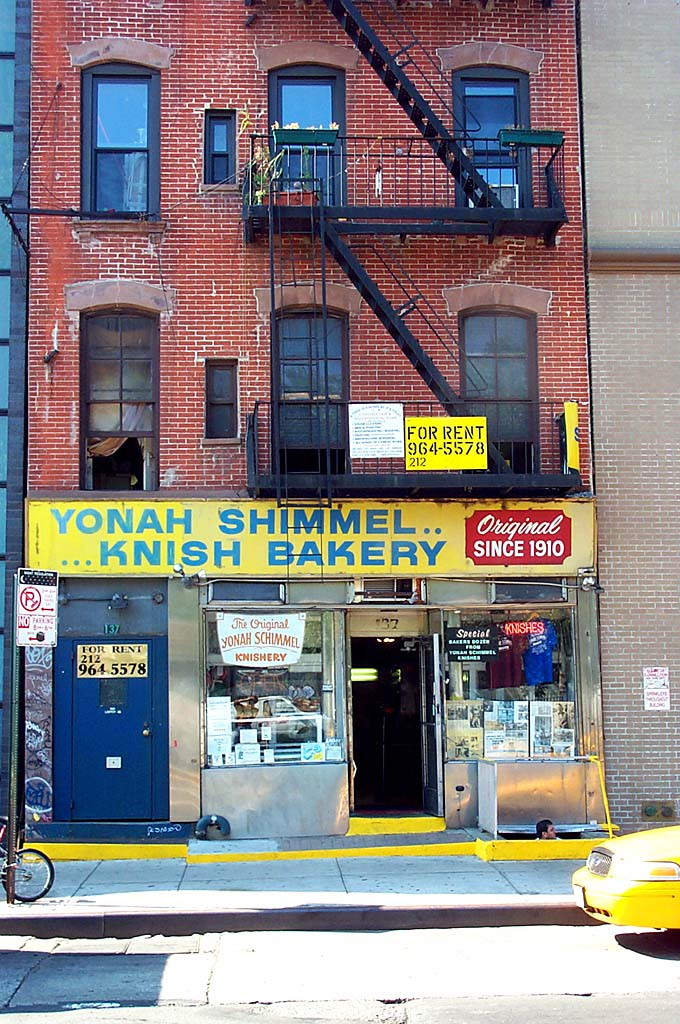
Yonah Shimmel's Knish Bakery specializes in knishes.

This is a list of notable kosher restaurants. A kosher restaurant is an establishment that serves food that complies with Jewish dietary laws (kashrut). These businesses, which also include diners, cafés, pizzerias, fast food, and cafeterias, and are frequently in listings together with kosher bakeries, butchers, caterers, and other similar places, differ from kosher-style establishments, which offer traditionally Jewish foods made from non-kosher ingredients (i.e., Katz's Delicatessen is kosher-style, meaning they sell all-beef frankfurters made from non-kosher beef).

Kosher restaurants typically operate under rabbinical supervision, which requires that kashrut, as well as certain other Jewish laws, must be observed.

== Kosher restaurants ==
Name	Origin	Description
Basil Pizza & Wine Bar	Brooklyn, United States	foodie destination restaurant
Ben's Kosher Deli	New York City, United States	Long Island and Florida locations of a chain
Bloom's	England	Until its last branch closed in summer 2010, Bloom's restaurant was the longest-standing kosher restaurant in England.
B&H Dairy	New York City, United States	1930s era luncheonette and kosher dairy
Creole Kosher Kitchen	New Orleans, United States	Was one of the only kosher restaurants in the city of New Orleans, Louisiana prior to Hurricane Katrina. It remains closed.
Deli 613	Dublin, Ireland	Opened in 2023, first fully kosher eatery operating in Ireland since the late 1960s.
Grodzinski Bakery	England	A chain of kosher bakeries in London, England, and Toronto, Canada.
Jeff's Gourmet Sausage Factory	Los Angeles, United States	Established in 1999 in a storefront in the Pico-Robertson district, Jeff's Gourmet makes and sells its own sausages, hamburgers, and delicatessen meats carrying glatt kosher certification. In 2015 the restaurant opened the first glatt kosher hot dog stand at Dodger Stadium, open for all home games except those held on Friday, Shabbat, and Jewish holidays.
Jewish Museum Munich	Munich	Museum and kosher restaurant.
L'As du Fallafel	Paris France	A kosher Middle Eastern restaurant located in the "Pletzl" Jewish quarter of the Le Marais neighborhood in Paris, France.
Lavana's	New York City	Fine dining kosher restaurant in New York City. Permanently closed.
Liebman's Deli	Riverdale, New York	The last kosher deli in the Bronx.
Masbia	New York City, United States	A network of kosher soup kitchens in New York City.
Pardes Restaurant	Brooklyn, United States	Kosher bistro in Brooklyn, New York City. Permanently closed.
Ratner's	Manhattan, United States	A famous Jewish kosher dairy (milchig) restaurant on the Lower East Side of New York City. Closed in 2002.
Second Avenue Deli	Manhattan	Certified-kosher delicatessen in Manhattan, New York City, it originally opened in 1954.
Taïm	Manhattan	An Israeli vegetarian restaurant located at 45 Spring Street (on the corner of Mulberry Street), in NoLita in Manhattan, in New York City.
Yonah Shimmel's Knish Bakery	Manhattan	A bakery, located at 137 East Houston Street (between First Avenue and Second Avenue) on the Lower East Side of Manhattan, that has been selling knishes since 1890 from its original location on Houston Street.
Zak the Baker	Miami, United States	A kosher bakery and cafe known for sourdough bread and challah bread, among other items. Zak the Baker opened a new glatt kosher deli in January 2017.

Kosher restaurants

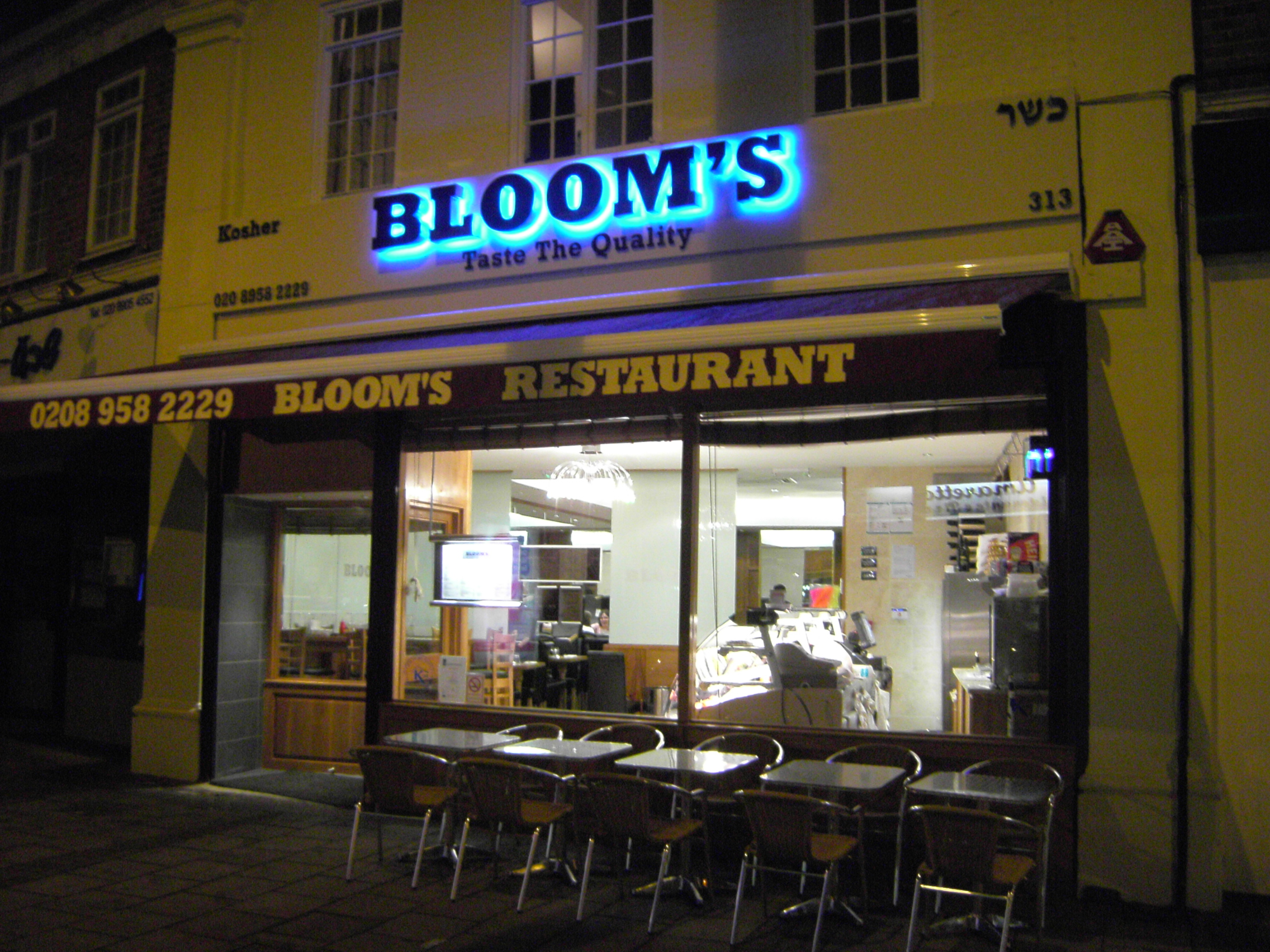
Bloom's restaurant was the longest-standing kosher restaurant in England.

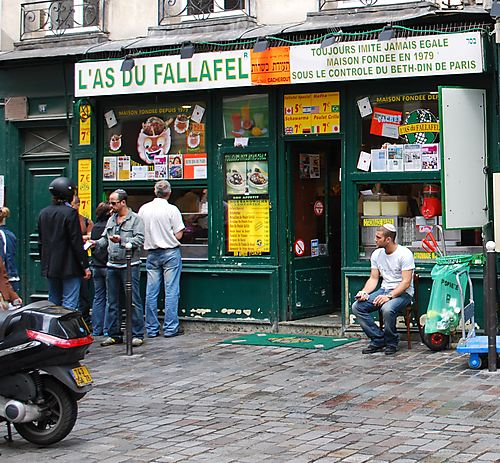
L'As du Fallafel

== See also ==
- American Jewish cuisine
- Israeli cuisine
- Jewish cuisine
- Kosher foods
- Kosher style
- Kosher airline meal
- List of delicatessens
- List of Israeli dishes
- List of Jewish cuisine dishes
- List of restaurants in Israel
- Lists of restaurants
