= Sherman's Deli & Bakery =

Pair of kosher delis in the U.S. state of California

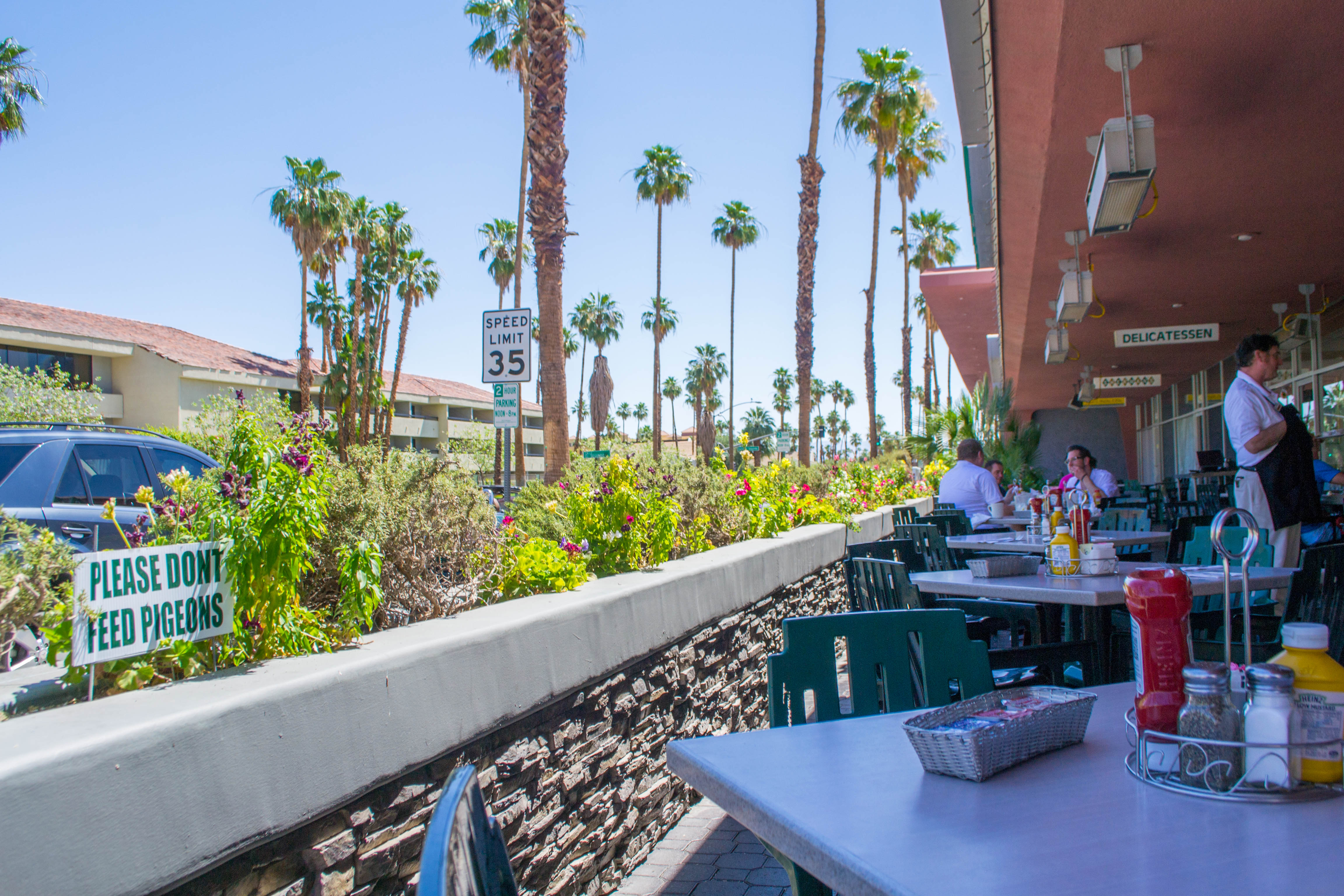
- Outdoor seating at the restaurant in Palm Springs, California, in 2013

Restaurant information
- Location: California, United States

Sherman's Deli & Bakery is a pair of kosher delicatessens in Palm Springs and Palm Desert, California.

The Palm Springs location has appeared on the Food Network's Diners, Drive-Ins and Dives.

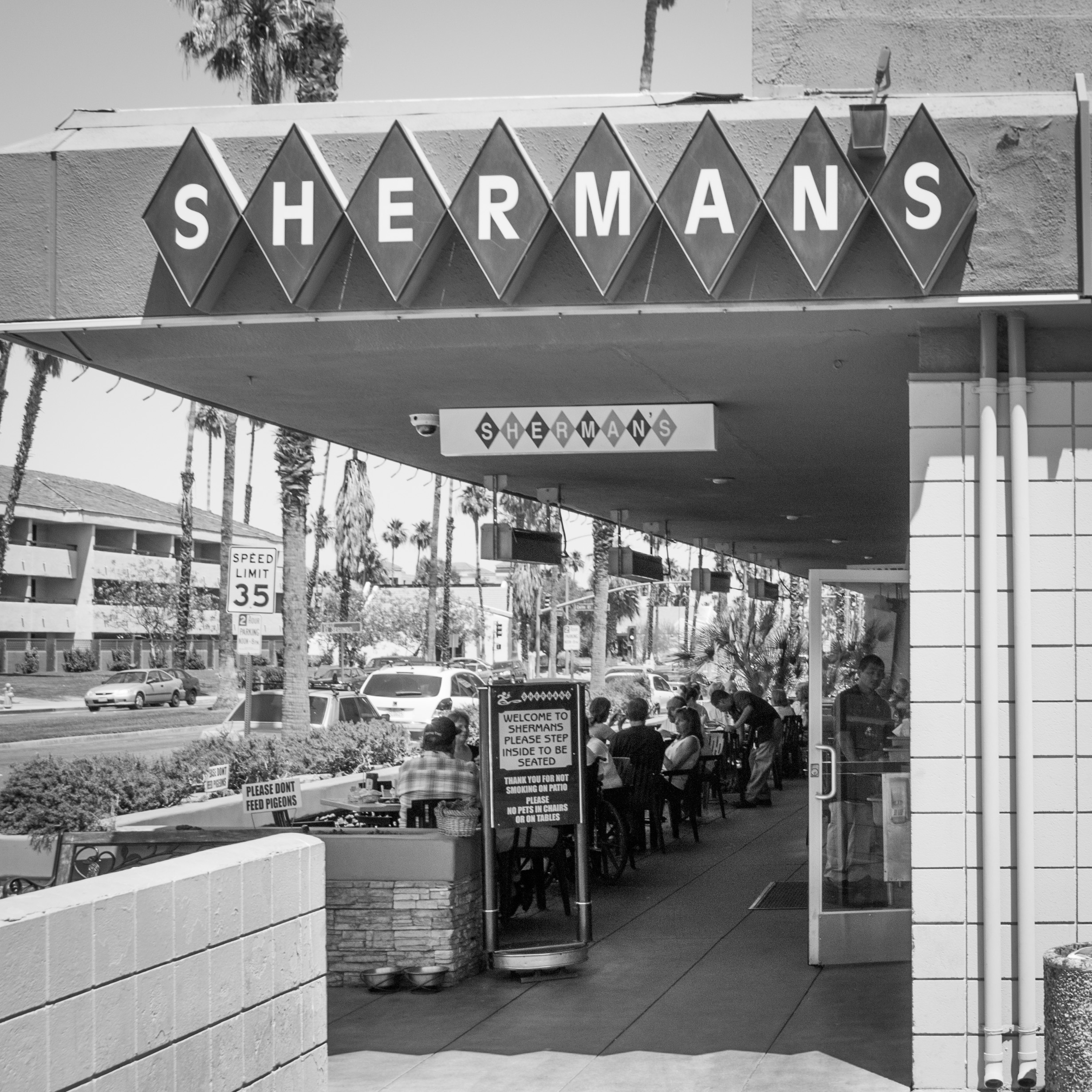

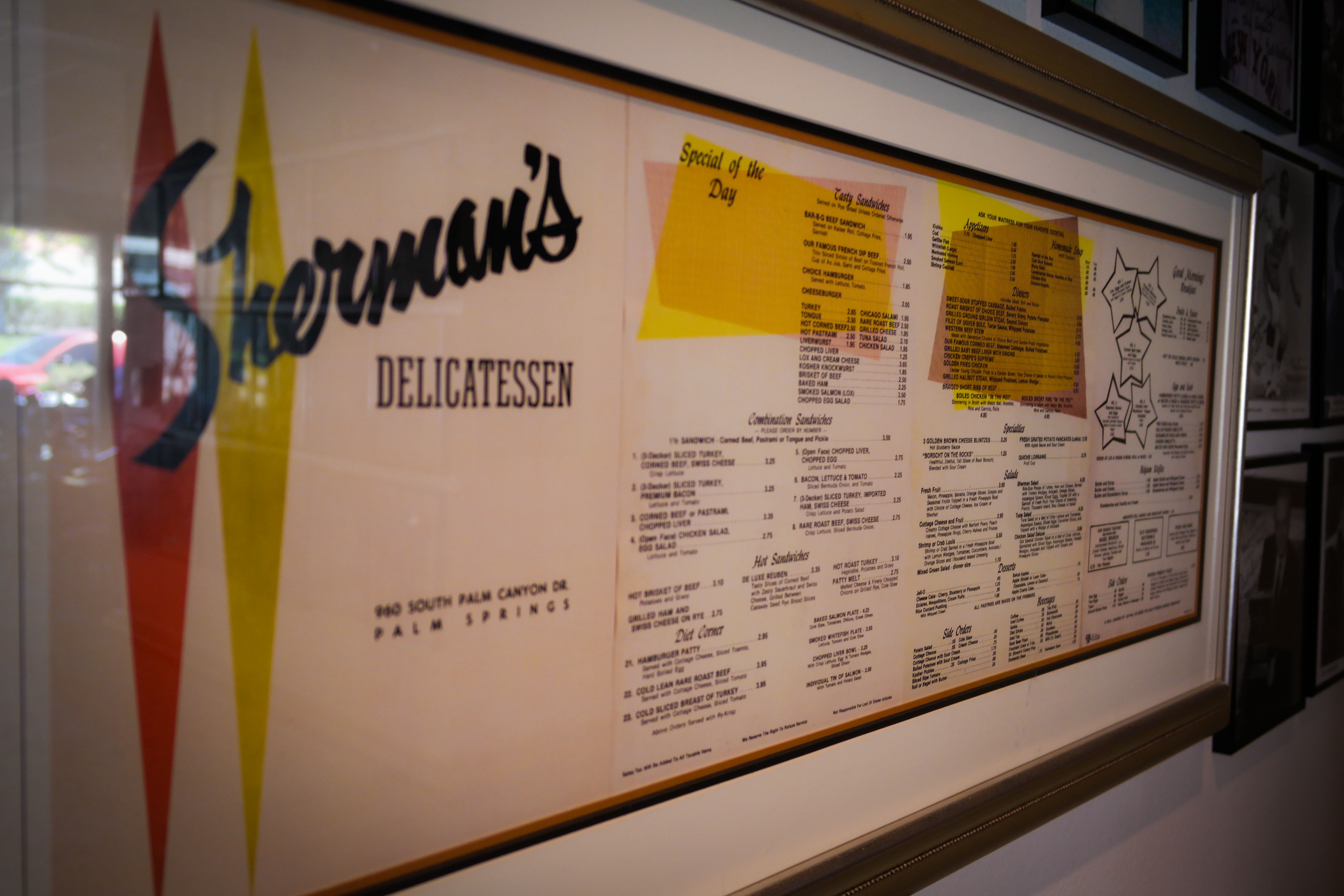

== See also ==
- List of Diners, Drive-Ins and Dives episodes
- List of kosher restaurants
