= Zak the Baker =

Company based in Miami

Restaurant information
- Established: 2012
- Head chef: Zak Stern
- Food type: Kosher food, bakery and deli items
- Location: 405 NW 26th St. (deli); 295 NW 26th S. (bakery), Wynwood, Miami, Florida, United States
- Website: zakthebaker.com

Bakery or Zak the Baker is a kosher restaurant in the Wynwood neighborhood of Miami, Florida. After the bakery was moved into a larger building, Zak the Baker opened a new glatt kosher delicatessen in January 2017 in the old bakery location. The associated bakery and café were both founded by local baker Zak Stern. The bakery closes on Saturdays, in keeping with kosher requirements.

The bakery has developed a reputation for its sourdough bread, among other items such as challah bread.

== Recognition ==
In 2013, Zak Stern was named Best Baker by the Miami New Times in their Best of Miami Awards. In 2014 the Zak the Baker Wynwood Bakery & Cafe won Best Bakery in the Best of Miami Awards, and Stern won the Baking & Pastry Chef of the Year award at the JWU Zest Awards for his work with the restaurant in 2015.

== See also ==
- List of kosher restaurants
- List of bakeries
- List of delicatessens
- List of Michelin Bib Gourmand restaurants in the United States
