= East Side Kosher Deli =

- Interactive map of East Side Kosher Deli

Restaurant information
- Established: 1991
- Owner: Joshua Horowitz
- Previous owners: Michael and Marcy Schreiber
- Food type: Kosher
- Location: 499 South Elm Street Glendale, Glendale, Colorado, 80246, United States
- Coordinates: 39.7077°N 104.9303°W
- Website: https://www.eastsidekosherdeli.com/

East Side Kosher Deli (ESKD), is a combination grocer, deli, bakery, butcher, sushi bar and kosher restaurant located at 499 S Elm St, Glendale, Colorado, U.S. It has been in business since 1991 and is one of the only fully Kosher grocers and sit-down restaurants in the city. The restaurant space in the back contrains a multipurpose event room. The official business licensee name is DENVER KOSHER LLC. The Kosher supervision is The Scroll K and Vaad Hakashrus of Denver. The 24,000-square-foot retail store contains over 5,000 distinct kosher items.

On Labor Day 1996, Marcy and Michael Schreiber purchased the deli to prevent it from closing down. In 2015, Joshua Horowitz purchased and took over ownership of the deli. The restaurant menu contains a variety of traditional Jewish cuisine options, as well as kosher versions of international cuisines, such as Asian, Italian and Hispanic dishes. The restaurant serves catering gigs for office parties and hotels that need Kosher options.

In 2024 Radio Chavura awarded previous owners Marcy and Michael Schreiber the “Pillars of the Colorado Jewish Community” award for their contributions to the Jewish community through running the deli. The current deli building was previously a Russian nightclub.
