= Creole Kosher Kitchen =

- Location within Louisiana

Restaurant information
- Established: 2000
- Closed: 2005
- Location: 115 Chartres St, New Orleans, Louisiana
- Coordinates: 29°57′11″N 90°4′4.25″W

Creole Kosher Kitchen was a kosher restaurant in the city of New Orleans. The restaurant, which was located in the French Quarter, was forced to close following severe devastation from the hurricane that ultimately led to the relocation of the family business to Los Angeles.

Creole Kosher Kitchen was started in 2000 by Gideon Daneshrad, also known as Chef Gideon, a local businessman who had operated several area shops. Gideon's goal was to provide an escape from the non-kosher food that filled the tourist area of New Orleans. The food served replicated the style of traditional New Orleans food, minus non-kosher ingredients such as shrimp and crawfish. The location was a popular hangout for Jewish and non-Jewish travelers alike, and was one of the only kosher restaurants in the city.

When Katrina struck, the Daneshrads, a well-known family in the New Orleans area, traveled to Los Angeles, where members of their family lived. Following the storm, they returned briefly to New Orleans to assess the damage to their property. Soon after, they permanently settled in Los Angeles, where Chef Gideon contemplated bringing his recipes to the area.

Following Katrina, the other kosher restaurants in the Greater New Orleans area reopened. Creole Kosher Kitchen, however, has remained closed. An Italian cafe currently operates out of its former location.

== See also ==
- List of kosher restaurants
- Geographies of New Orleans By Richard Campanella, University of Louisiana at Lafayette. Center for Louisiana Studies, ISBN 1-887366-68-7, ISBN 978-1-887366-68-7
