= Deli 613 =

Kosher deli in Dublin, Ireland

Coordinates: 53°19′09″N 06°15′53″W

- Interactive map of Deli 613

Restaurant information
- Established: March 2023
- Owners: Rifka and Zalman Lent
- Food type: Kosher
- Location: 89 Rathmines Road Upper, Dublin, D06 CX89, Ireland
- Website: deli613.ie

Deli 613 is a kosher deli in Rathmines, Dublin, Ireland. It is located in the Chabad house building of the Chabad-Lubavitch of Ireland, which operates the deli. Opened in 2023, it is believed to be the first fully kosher eatery in Ireland since the 1960s, and has seating as well as takeaway service.

== Background ==
The small Jewish community in Ireland traditionally relied on suppliers in the United Kingdom for kosher products. Following the UK's withdrawal from the European Union, there was a shortage of kosher food in Ireland due to additional regulatory requirements and checks.

The owners, Rifka and Zalman Lent, emissaries of the Chabad-Lubavitch movement in Dublin, envisioned the deli as a partial solution to the kosher food shortage in Ireland. The "613" in the deli's name references the 613 mitzvot (commandments) in the Torah.

== History ==
The deli opened in a former 19th-century schoolhouse attached to the Chabad house in the southern part of Dublin in March 2023. Upon its opening, Deli 613 was believed to be the first fully kosher eatery in Ireland since the late 1960s.

== Food ==
Deli 613 serves a mix of local and Jewish cuisine. Made-to-order items include Ashekenazi foods such as salt beef, chopped liver and herring alongside Israeli foods such as hummus, falafel and tahini.

The kosher food is mainly sourced from the EU. Previously, the Lents shipped their kosher food supply from the UK. The deli imports its bagels frozen from New York due to a lack of kosher bagel wholesalers in Europe. Deli 613's chef Robbie Burns is not Jewish, but has experience in the Irish food market, and he works alongside a part-time Jewish assistant chef.

== Facilities ==
Deli 613 has seating inside and outside, as well as takeaway service, and offers cakes and catering on an advance-order basis.

== Reception ==
According to the owners, the majority of Deli 613's clientele is non-Jewish. After its opening, a number of celebrities visited the establishment. In July 2023, Leo Varadkar, Ireland's Taoiseach, went to Deli 613 for traditional Jewish foods like latkes, matzah ball soup, and a salt beef sandwich. Former Scottish football player Graeme Souness, actor Colm Meaney, and celebrity chef Donal Skehan have also visited.

The Irish Times awarded the restaurant four-and-a-half stars, describing it as a "great addition to the neighbourhood".

== See also ==
- List of kosher restaurants
- History of the Jews in Ireland
