= Levana (disambiguation) =

Levana is an ancient Roman goddess.

Levana may also refer to:

- brand name of Cinazepam
- Hebrew feminine name. Notable people with the name include:
  - Levana Finkelstein (born 1947), Israeli actress and sculptress
  - Levana Kirschenbaum, American restaurateur, caterer, cooking teacher and food writer
  - Levana Moshon (born 1952), Israeli writer, journalist, teacher and children's storyteller
- Queen Levana, from a series of novels by Marissa Mayer, The Lunar Chronicles.

== See also ==
- Levanna
