= Grodzinski Bakery =

Chain of kosher bakeries in London, England and Toronto, Canada

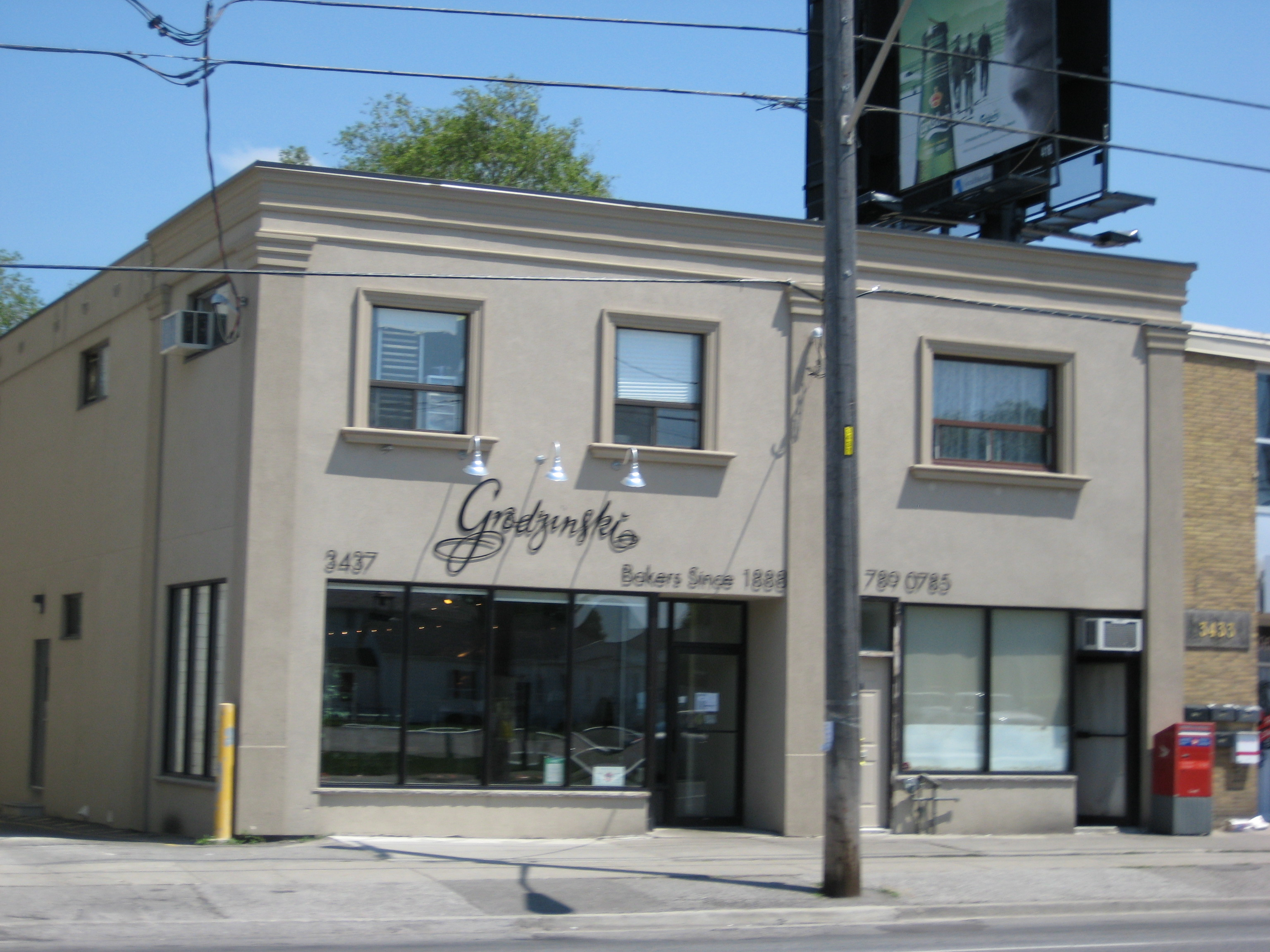
- Industry: Bakery
- Founded: 1888; 138 years ago
- Founder: Harris and Judith Grodzinski
- Area served: London; Toronto
- Website: grodz.co.uk (Golders Green / Edgware); grodzinski.co.uk (Stanford Hill); grodzinskibakery.com (Toronto)

Grodzinski is a chain of kosher bakeries in London, England and in Toronto, where it is known as "Grodz."

The Golders Green branch was visited by UK Prime Minister Boris Johnson during his campaign before the 2019 general election, where he iced doughnuts.

== Notable products ==
Grodzinski is known for its challah, a yeast bread eaten on the Sabbath, and for its babka, a cake made from a variant of yeast dough with chocolate, cinnamon, fruit, or cheese filling. Other products include bagels and cookies.

== History ==
=== Early years ===
Around 1888, bakers Harris and Judith Grodzinski joined many members of the Jewish community in the Russian Empire by migrating westward from Voranava (once a shtetl near Lida, currently in Belarus) and establishing themselves in the East End of London. There, they hired kosher ovens and set out baking Bilkele, thereby beginning a business that would grow from a trading barrow to a full-scale bakery founded in 1888.

Harris and Judith were followed by Harris's nephew, Hyam Elyah Grodzinski, who had married Judith's sister Jessie. He had a bakery at 20 Cavell Street, then called Bedford Street, before moving to a shop in Fieldgate Street, Whitechapel, over which he lived. Around the same time, the Fieldgate Street Great Synagogue was established next door, with the bakery's basement ovens extending beneath the synagogue.

The two families exchanged premises, including the accommodation above, for a period of time until there was significant improvement in the Fieldgate Street bakery. Later, Hyam changed his name to Hyam Hyams and entered the cinema business along with his sons Phil and Sid.

=== Domestic expansion ===
The bakery was then run by Harry and Judith's son Abraham (Abie) Grodzinski, who took over management of the business at the age of 18 after his father's death at the age of 54. Abie's widow, Bertha Jeidel, took over the company when Abie died from the Spanish flu pandemic. Their eldest children, Harry and Ruby Grodzinski, took over the company in 1930.

Under Harry's and Ruby's tenure, the bakery opened a second location at 91 Dunsmure Road, Stamford Hill, to which baking was moved. A decade later, the bakery expanded to six locations. The original 31 Fieldgate Street location was destroyed by a German air raid on 29 December 1940. By the mid-1960s Grodzinski was the largest kosher bakery in Europe, preparing both fine pastries and a range of bread, and adding to their retail business, an advancing wholesale operation distributed through British retailers and department stores such as Selfridges, Marks & Spencer and Harrods.

In 2014, the bakery had multiple locations in England.

=== Overseas expansion ===
In 1999, the first Grodzinski bakery was opened in Toronto, continuing the family baking tradition into the fourth and fifth generations. When it opened, the Edgware branch in London was managed by Tova Grodzinski, the great-great-granddaughter of the founders.

In 2014, the bakery had two Toronto locations, one on Bathurst Street and the other in Thornhill.

In February 2022, the Thornhill location was sold to the owners of Tova's Bakery.

== See also ==
- List of kosher restaurants
