= Yonah Schimmel's Knish Bakery =

Bakery and restaurant located in Manhattan

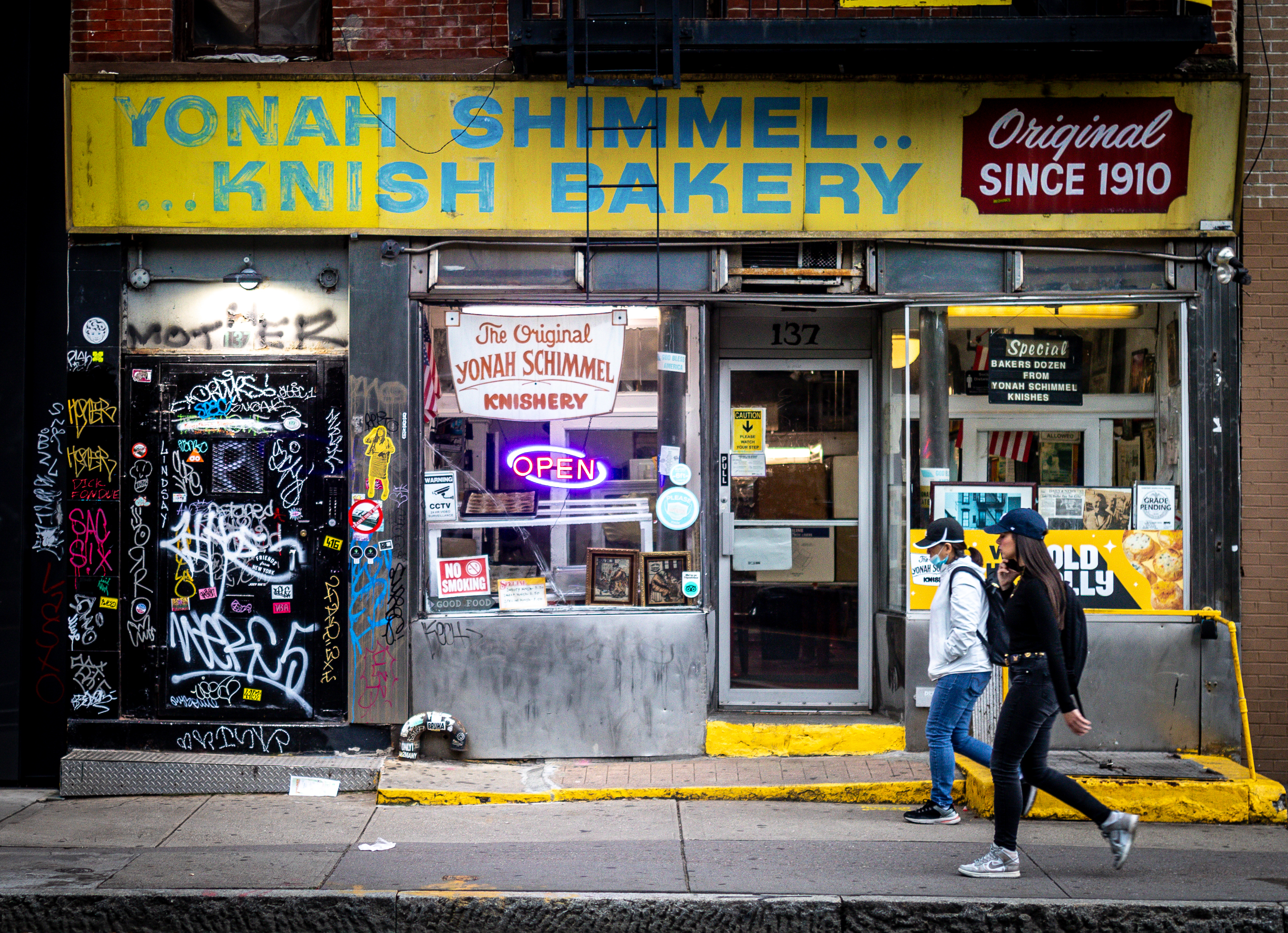
- Yonah Schimmel's Knish Bakery

- Location within Manhattan

Restaurant information
- Established: 1890
- Food type: Kosher bakery
- Location: 137 East Houston Street (between First Avenue and Second Avenue), on the Lower East Side of Manhattan, New York City, New York, 10002, United States
- Coordinates: 40°43′23.23″N 73°59′24.51″W
- Website: knishery.com

Yonah Schimmel's Knish Bakery is a bakery and restaurant, located at 137 East Houston Street (between First Avenue and Second Avenue), on the Lower East Side of Manhattan, that has been selling knishes since 1890. Its current location on Houston Street opened in 1910. It is certified CupK Kosher.

As the Lower East Side has changed over the decades and many of its Jewish residents have departed, Yonah Schimmel's is one of the few Jewish businesses and restaurants that remain as a fixture of this culture and cuisine.

As cited in The Underground Gourmet, a review of Yonah Schimmel's in a collection of restaurant reviews by Milton Glaser and Jerome Snyder, "No New York politician in the last 50 years has been elected to office without having at least one photograph showing him on the Lower East Side with a knish in his face." The business in mentioned in The Hoods by Harry Grey published in 1953, the source material for the film Once Upon a Time in America directed by Sergio Leone.

== History ==
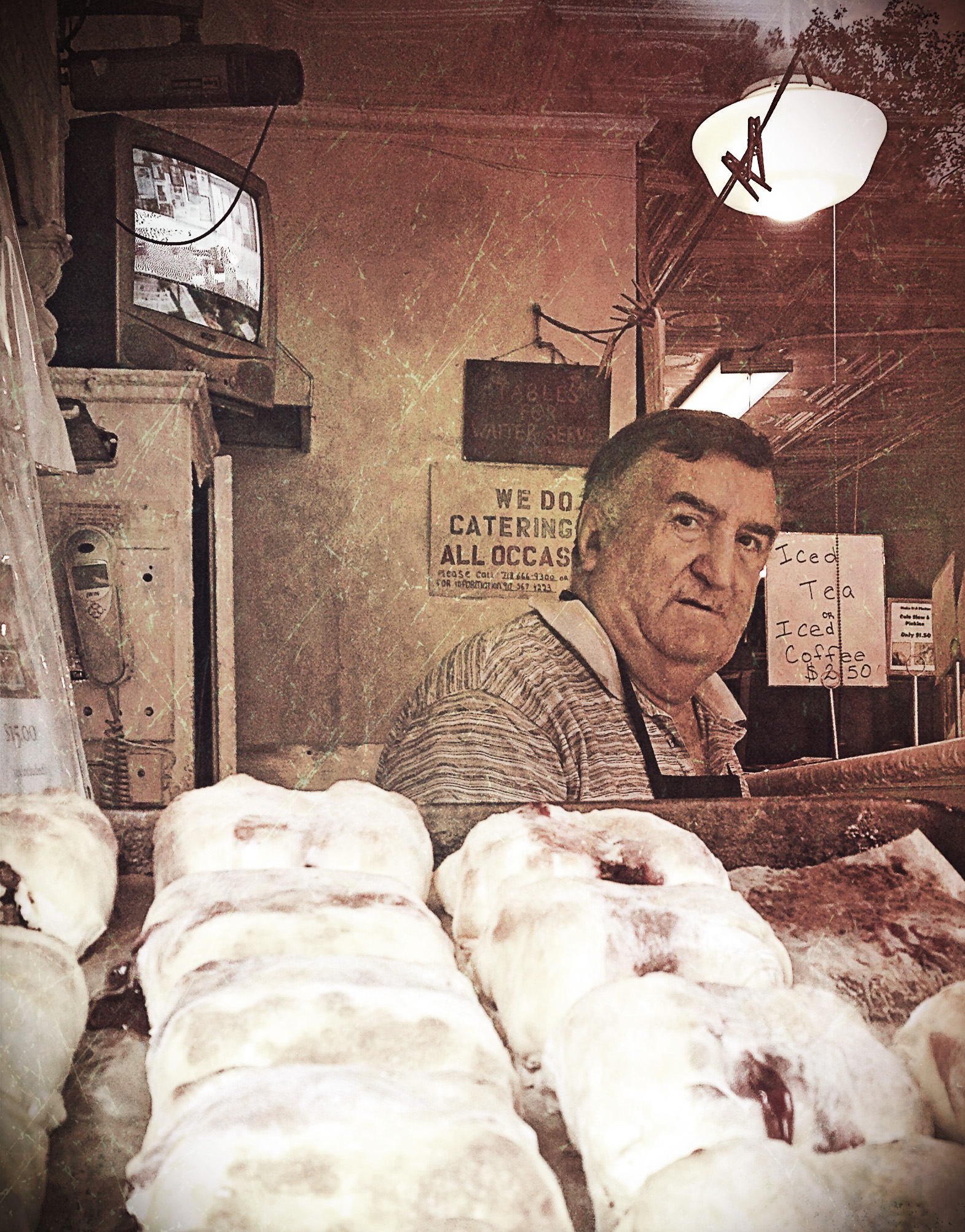
Alex Wolfman in Yonah Schimmel's window

About 1910, Yonah Schimmel, an immigrant from the Austro-Hungarian province of Galicia, used a pushcart to start his knish bakery. As business grew, a small store at 156 Allen Street was rented by Yonah.

By 1916, Schimmel operated knish bakeries at Allen St., 74 Rivington, 44 Ave. B, and 144 E. Houston (across the street from the present knishery location).

Around 1915, Schimmel went into partnership at the 144 E. Houston St. store with Josef Berger, who had married Yonah’s cousin Rose Schimel. Berger eventually took over the Houston St. store, retaining the original name.

In the 1930s, a widening of Houston St. was undertaken in order to accommodate construction of the Subway system’s Sixth Avenue line. At some point in the 1930s the Houston St. store moved from the North side of the street to its present location at 137 E. Houston.

In 1931 Josef Berger died, and his son Arthur Berger operated Yonah Schimmel's Knishery until he passed in 1974. Arthur's widow, Lillian Berger, continued to run the bakery until approximately 1990.

Yonah Schimmel's has been family owned since its inception and is currently operated by Yonah's great nephew, Alex Wolfman.

In 1995, the shop's then-owner, Sheldon Keitz, was implicated in a loan-sharking scheme. The shop was amongst the locations where loans were repaid.

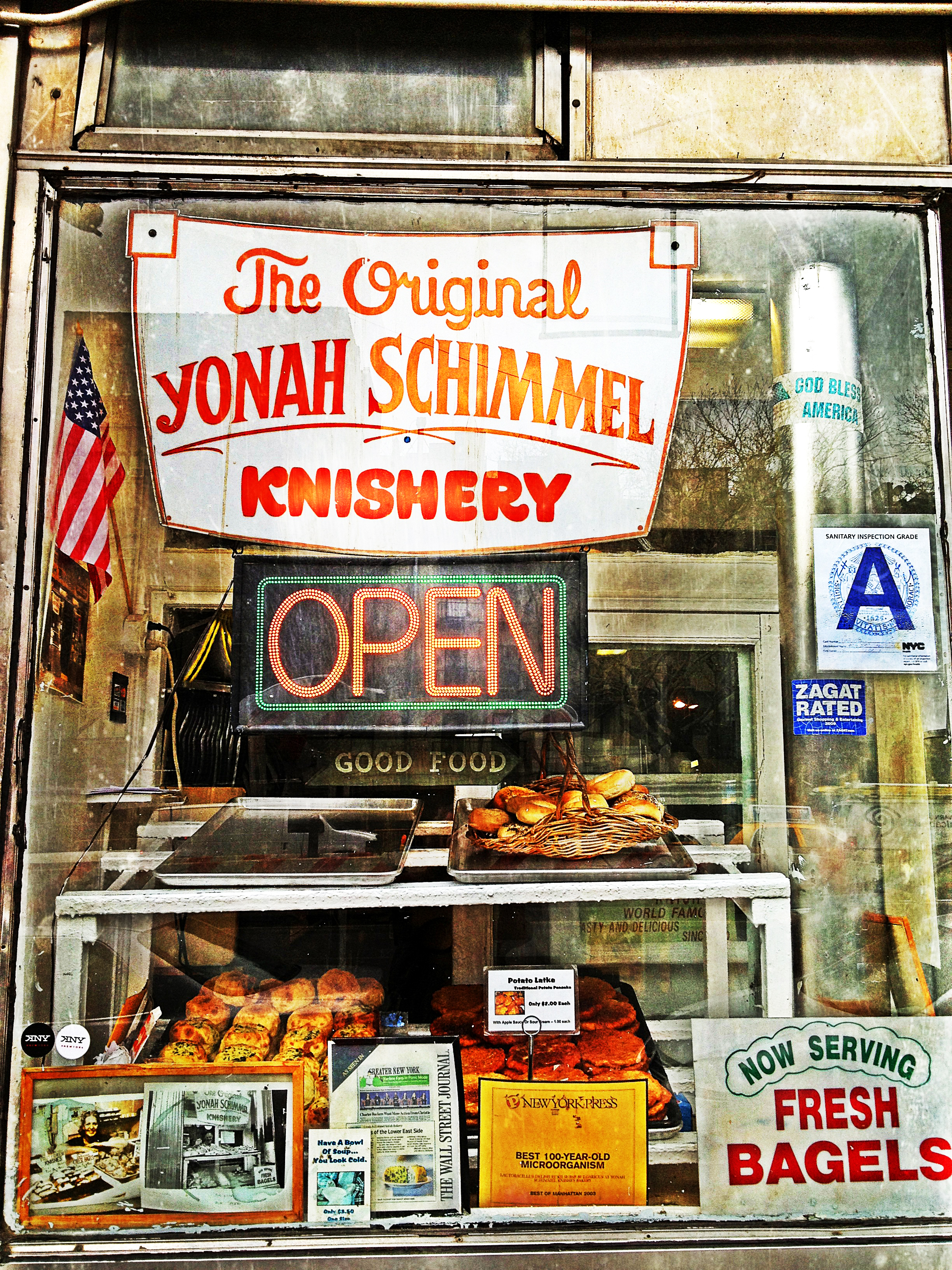
Yonah Schimmel's Knish Bakery Front Window

It is as much a landmark as an eatery and has frequently been an artist's subject. A portrait of the Yonah Schimmel Knish Bakery by Hedy Pagremanski (b. 1929) is in the permanent collection of the Museum of the City of New York. Jewish-Irish painter Harry Kernoff painted this bakery on a trip to New York in 1939. More recently it features in the 2009 Woody Allen film Whatever Works.

The restaurant offers a number of varieties of knishes, including the traditional potato and kasha (buckwheat groats) knishes, known for using the same recipe since the bakery's opening, as well as dessert knishes such as Cherry-Cheese, and Blueberry-Cheese, in addition to other kinds of Eastern European food such as borscht, and runs a takeout business. In recent years the restaurant has delivered its knishes nationally through Goldbelly, and has been featured in the site's YouTube series.

== See also ==
- List of Ashkenazi Jewish restaurants
- List of bakeries
- List of delicatessens
- List of kosher restaurants
- Jews in New York City
