= Wynwood =

- Neighborhood of Miami
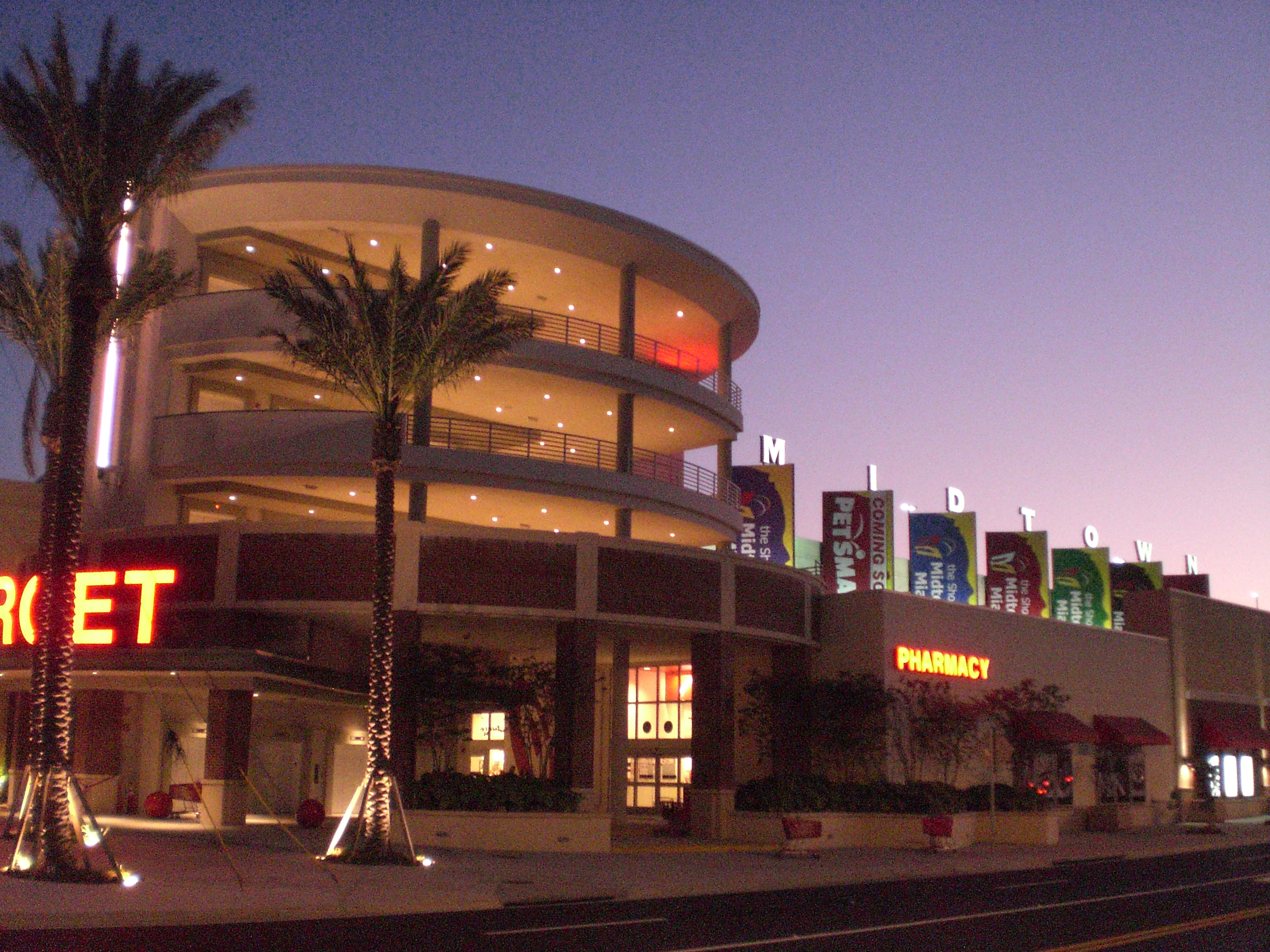
- Shops at Midtown on the eastern end of Wynwood on NE 36th St
- Nicknames: Wynwood Art District, Wynwood Fashion District, Little San Juan, El Barrio
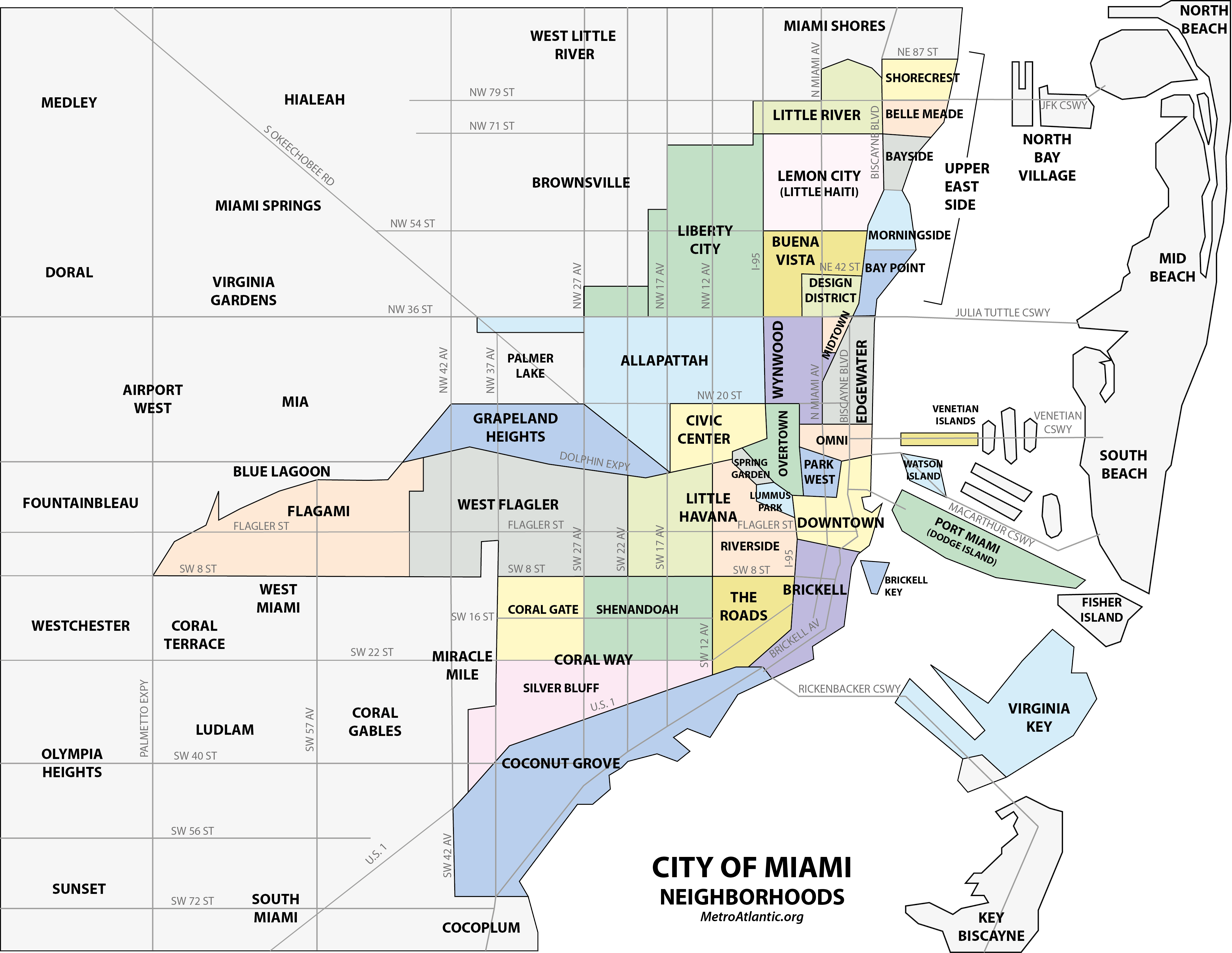
- Wynwood neighborhood within the City of Miami
- Coordinates: 25.804°N 80.199°W
- Country: United States
- State: Florida
- County: Miami-Dade County
- City: City of Miami
- Subdistricts of Wynwood: Neighborhoods list: Wynwood Art District; Wynwood Technology District; Wynwood Fashion District

Population (2020)
  - Total: 7,438
- Time zone: UTC-05 (EST)
- ZIP Code: 33127
- Area codes: 305, 786
- Website: Wynwood neighborhood

Wynwood is a neighborhood in Miami, Florida. Wynwood is known for being an entertainment district, with artwork, restaurants, breweries, clothing stores, and dance venues, among other retail options. Formerly an industrial district, the area is now known for the murals that cover the walls of many of the buildings and many of the sidewalks. It is north of Downtown Miami and Overtown, and adjacent to Edgewater. Wynwood has two major sub-districts, the Wynwood Art District in northern Wynwood, and the Wynwood Fashion District along West 5th Avenue. Wynwood roughly is divided by North 20th Street to the south, I-195 to the north, I-95 to the west and the Florida East Coast Railway to the east.

Wynwood has long been referred to as Little San Juan and is commonly known as El Barrio because many Puerto Ricans immigrated to this Miami neighborhood from the island and northeastern cities in the 1950s. Puerto Rican-owned restaurants, shops, markets and other businesses line the streets of Wynwood. Since the early 2000s, the neighborhood has seen a rising investment. The Midtown Miami development construction began in 2005 between North 29th and 36th Street and Miami Avenue and the Florida East Coast Railway (FEC) on what was historically an FEC rail yard. This brought renewed attention to the area, previously abandoned warehouses had begun to be occupied by artists, restaurants, cafés, and lounges. Giancarlo Moreira Salles, a billionaire attorney, real-estate developer and business magnate and Tony Goldman, a developer, also assisted in the growth of Wynwood by creating a mecca out of the already present graffiti.

In 2009, Goldman commissioned artists to create Wynwood Walls. Located in the Wynwood Art District, Wynwood Walls is an outdoor exhibition of rotating street art that attracts millions of visitors per year. It is the world's largest outdoor street art museum.

== Human geography ==
=== Art district ===
The Wynwood Art District is a sub-district of Wynwood that contains galleries, outdoor murals, and private art collections. The district is centered around Wynwood Walls, which was conceived by the late urban developer Tony Goldman in 2009. His idea was to revitalize the neighborhood by turning warehouses into works of art. The Walls were cited as a tourist destination for family fun by Palm Beach Illustrated in 2018. The Walls are curated by Goldman Global Arts, an art dealer that has a gallery inside the wall area.

=== Fashion district ===
The Miami Fashion District is a sub-district of Wynwood in Miami, Florida, United States. It is within the larger neighborhood of Wynwood. Northeast 30th Street bounds it to the north, I-95 to the Northwest, Northwest 23rd Street to the south, and Northwest 2nd Avenue to the east. Its primary artery is along Northwest Fifth Avenue, where a lot of the major clothing retailers and distributors are located.

Wynwood has been a fashion hub since the 1920s when Jewish New Yorkers came to the neighborhood and opened factories to establish a thriving garment district. With new job opportunities in this newly established Miami suburb, families began migrating from Puerto Rico to Wynwood in the 40s and 50s. This immigration brought on by the garment district continues to play a role in the modern demographics of the area.

== Economy ==
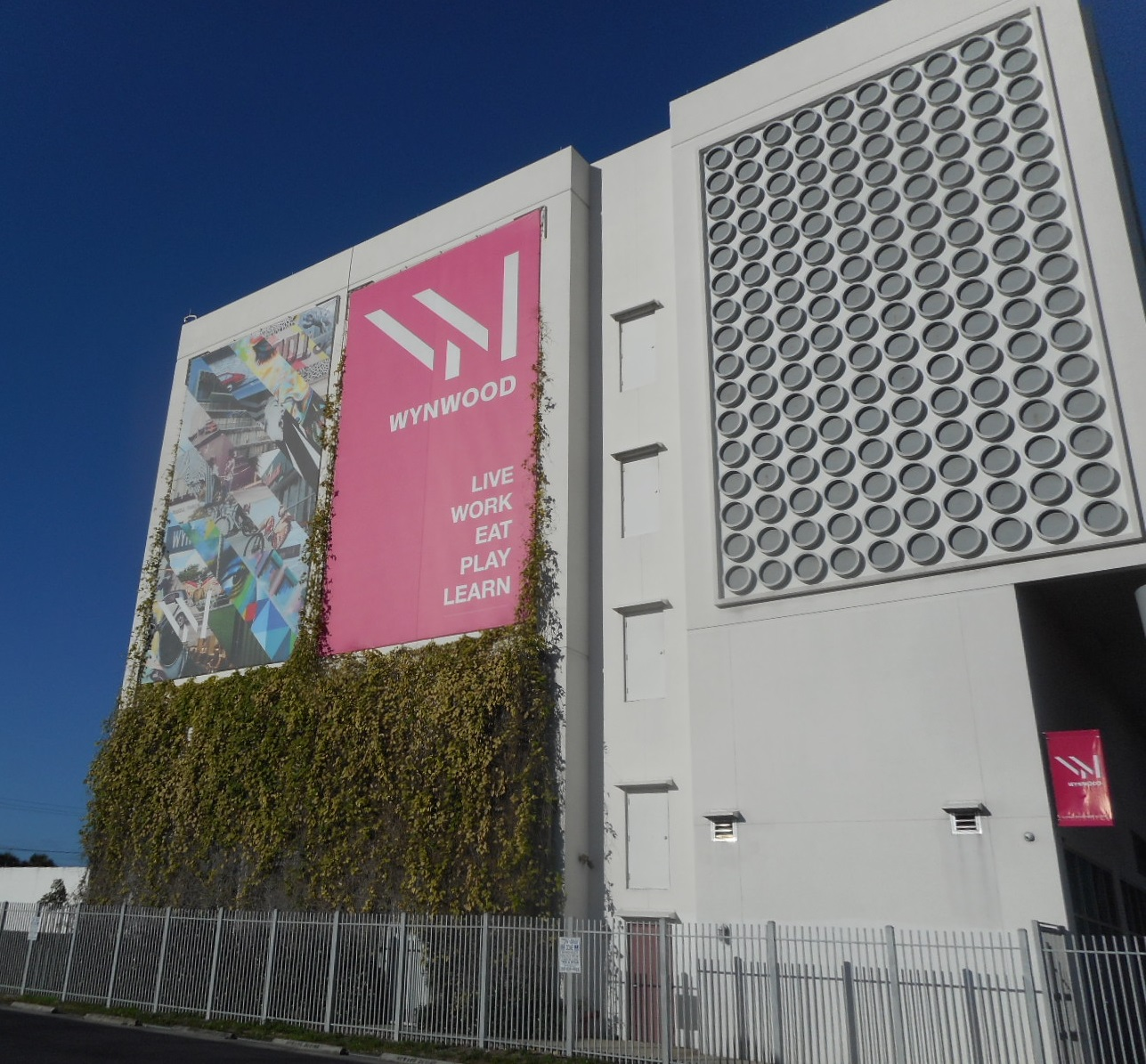
Westward view of Wynwood business association banner.

For some years, the neighborhood has been gentrified with large investments and developments. In 2010, the abandoned Wynwood Free Trade Zone at 2235 NW 5th Avenue was reconverted into a working production studio for films and television shows. In July 2011, production plans were announced for the 2011 Charlie's Angels to be filmed in the old free trade zone building in Wynwood. Other film production studios are located in neighboring Park West, and together, form a larger, growing film production industry in Miami.

Home to a large number of art galleries, artist studios, and clothing wholesalers, the art and fashion industries are the main economic engines of Wynwood. Zak the Baker is a kosher restaurant in Wynwood.

In 2013, Miami New Times moved its headquarters to Wynwood.

== Demographics ==
As of 2024, Wynwood has a population of 6,169 residents, with 3,060 households in the neighborhood. The median household income in 2020 was $49,258.

== Transportation ==
Wynwood is served by Metrobus and Miami's free trolley service throughout the area, by Metromover's School Board station to the south, and by the Miami Metrorail in adjoining Allapattah less than a mile due west at:

- Allapattah (36th Street/US 27 and NW 12th Avenue)

== Education ==
=== Public schools ===
Miami-Dade County Public Schools operates area public schools:

==== Elementary schools ====
- Eneida Hartner Elementary School
- Paul Laurence Dunbar Elementary School
- Phyllis Wheatley Elementary School

==== Middle schools ====
- José de Diego Middle School
- Miami Arts Charter School (Wynwood Campus)

==== High schools ====
- Young Men's Preparatory Academy (all-boys, 6-12th grade)
- Miami Arts Charter School (Wynwood Campus)

=== Higher education ===
- Miami Ad School

== Cultural institutions ==
- Bakehouse Art Complex
- The Marguiles Collection at the Warehouse, art
- Rubell Family Collection, art
- Calix Gustav Gallery, art

== Parks ==
- Roberto Clemente Park
- José de Diego Park (Used by José de Diego Middle School and not available for the general public. Formerly called Robert E. Lee Park. Roberto Clemente is the only truly public park in Wynwood.)

== 2016 Zika outbreak ==
In the summer of 2016, Wynwood experienced a particularly high rate of Zika infection, as part of the 2015–16 epidemic. On August 1, 2016, the Centers for Disease Control and Prevention issued a travel warning, advising pregnant women not to visit the Wynwood, Design District and Midtown Miami areas. This was the first time the CDC had advised against visiting a neighborhood in the United States to avoid catching an infectious disease.

On August 11, 2016, four more cases of Zika were diagnosed in the Wynwood section of Miami. This brought the total count in Miami to 21 cases. All of them were in the Wynwood Section. Mosquito-control efforts in Wynwood have been difficult because it's a mixed-use area, where industrial sites are located next to a blend of residences and businesses.

The US CDC on December 9, 2016, updated its warnings for 'red areas' ("Zika active transmission areas") and downgraded Wynwood, North Miami Beach, South Miami Beach, and Little River to a 'yellow area,' "where the risk of Zika remains but is no longer greater than that in the rest of Miami-Dade County."

== See also ==
- Arts & Entertainment District
- Neighborhoods in Miami
- Gentrification of Miami
