= Seven Mile Market =

American supermarket chain

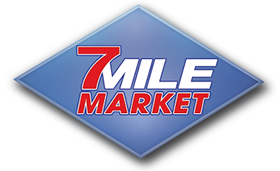
- Type: Supermarket
- Industry: grocery
- Predecessor: Jack's
- Headquarters: 201 Reisterstown Road, Pikesville, Maryland, United States
- Area served: Baltimore
- Products: Kosher foods
- Owner: Hershel Boehm
- Website: https://sevenmilemarket.com/

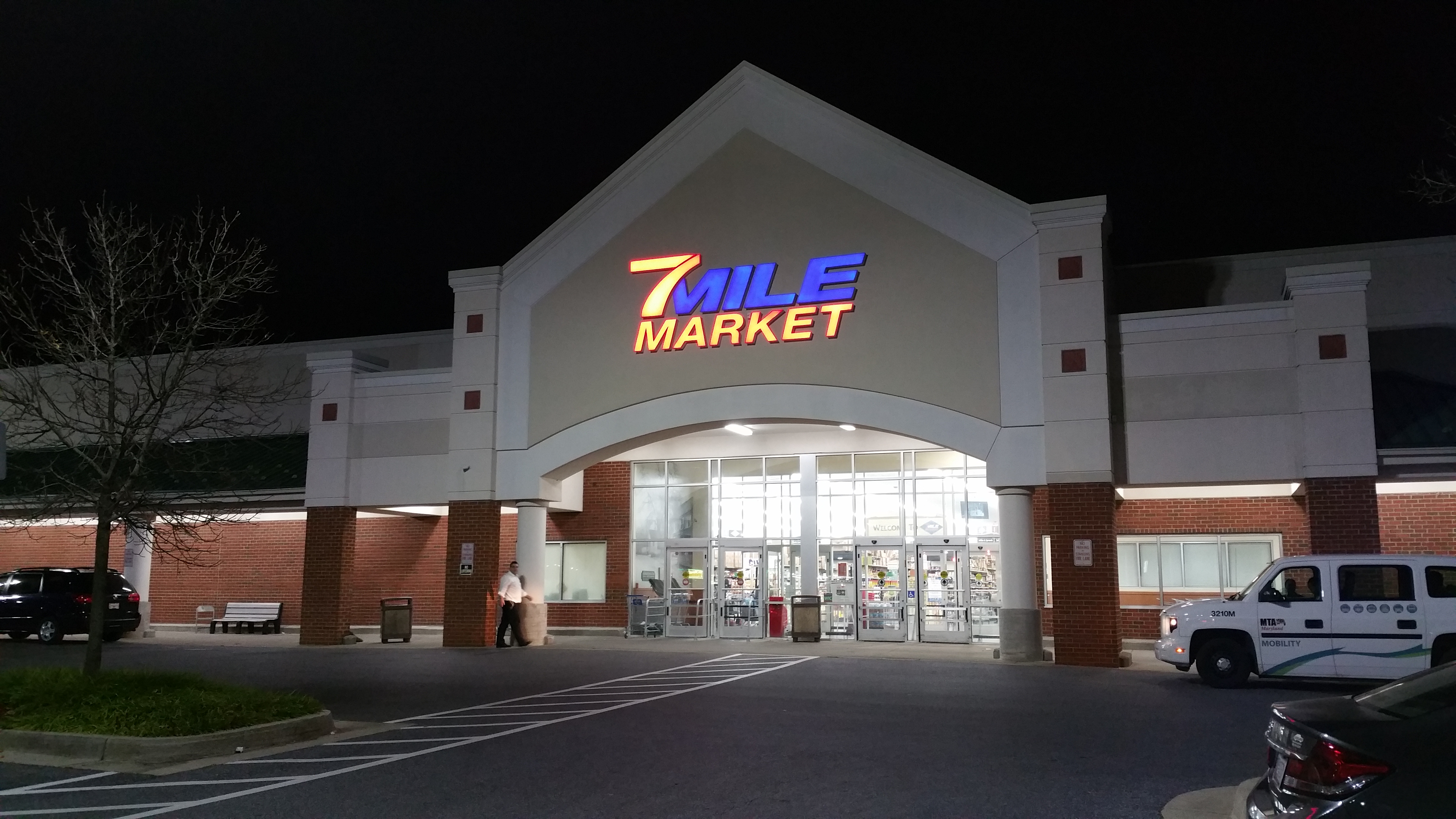
Current location

Seven Mile Market is the largest kosher supermarket in the United States. The store, which is located in Pikesville, Maryland, was established in 1988, and has been in its current location since November 16, 2010. The store, which is under the kashrut supervision of the Star-K, includes a floral department, and formerly included a pharmacy and an eyeware store.

== History ==
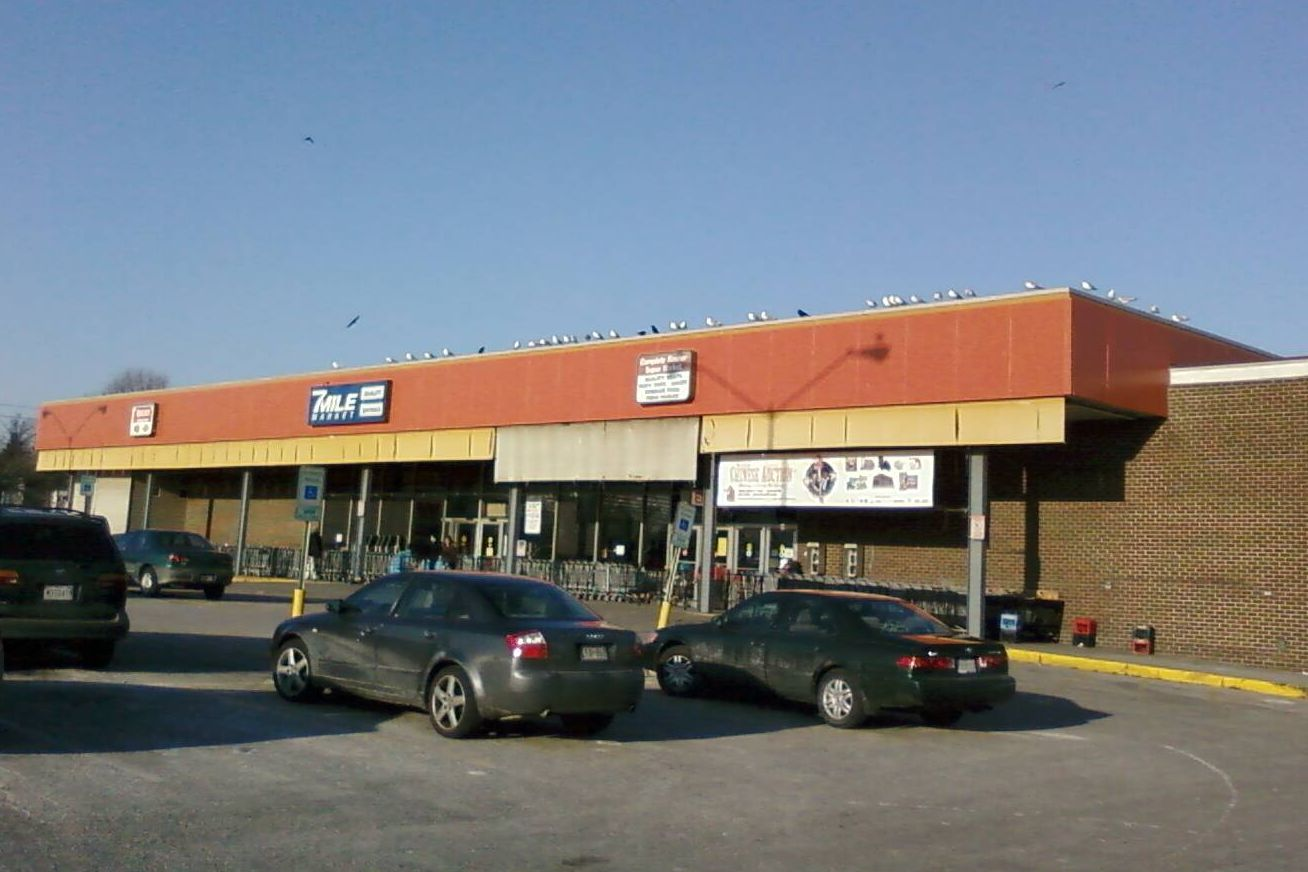
Outside of Seven Mile Market at its old location

Seven Mile Market first opened in 1988, marketing to the 100,000 in Baltimore's Jewish community. Its name comes from Seven Mile Lane, where it was originally located. The owner previously had a small store called Jack's.

The store has capitalized on a market for kosher food that has grown during the 2000s, as many consumers, including those who do not keep kosher, consider the food to be more sanitary.

In 2002, Seven Mile Market was sued by a wheelchair user for failure to comply with the Americans with Disabilities Act Title III. The case was settled out of court.

In 2010, the establishment moved into a former Safeway store on Reisterstown Road adjacent to its former location. It is currently located on Reisterstown Rd. At 55,000 square feet (5,100 m^{2}), this nearly doubled its prior amount of space, and made it the largest kosher supermarket in America. The Safeway once housed a kosher delicatessen, but that operation closed, and it was believed to be due to its inability to compete with Seven Mile Market. The previous largest kosher supermarket was Rockland Kosher in Monsey, New York, which has 45,000 square feet (4,200 m^{2}) of retail space.
