= Sidney Bloom =

- Born: Solomon Bloom; 1 January 1921; 58, Brick Lane
- Died: 1 June 2003 (aged 82); Wellington Hospital, London
- Education: Raine's Grammar School
- Spouse: Evelyn Radzan (m. 1942)
- Children: 2
- Culinary career
- Cooking style: Jewish cuisine

Solomon Bloom, known as Sidney Bloom (1 January 1921 – 1 June 2003), was a British Jewish restaurateur, who founded the famous kosher restaurant of Bloom's in London.
