= Bloom's restaurant =

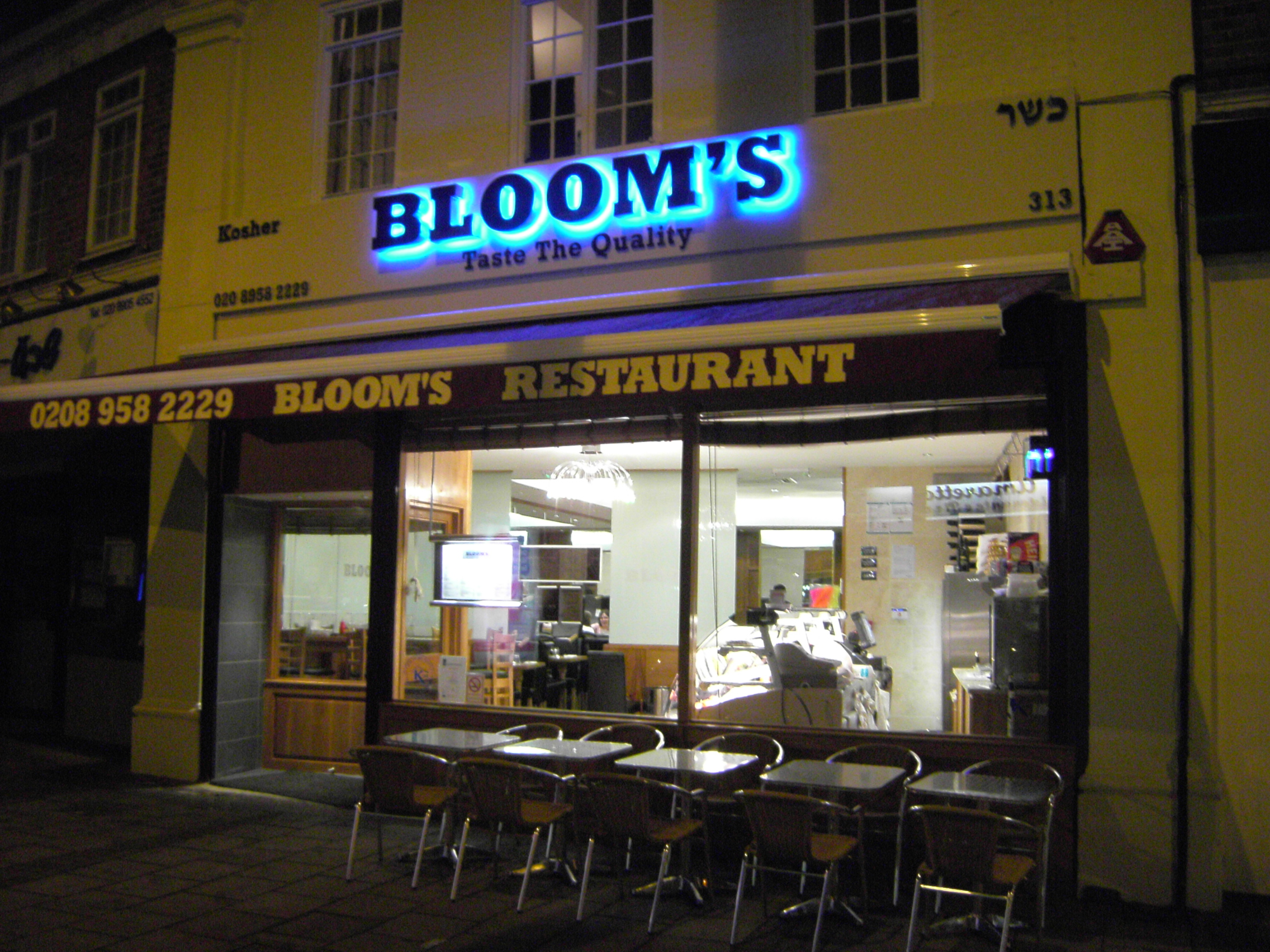
- Former Edgware branch

- Location within London

Restaurant information
- Established: 1920
- Closed: 2010
- Food type: Ashkenazi-style Jewish cuisine
- Location: London, United Kingdom
- Coordinates: 51°34′26″N 0°12′4″W

Bloom's restaurant was a kosher Jewish deli restaurant in London. Until its last branch closed in summer 2010, it was the longest-standing kosher restaurant in England, and was well-known beyond the Jewish community. Blooms was under the supervision of the London Beth Din.

== History ==
The original restaurant, in Brick Lane, London, was established by Morris Bloom in 1920. Morris Bloom was a Lithuanian immigrant. His son Sidney continued to run the family business, and in the early 1930s, the restaurant moved to Old Montague Street. In 1952, the restaurant moved to Whitechapel High Street, and subsequently, a second restaurant was opened in Golders Green. The East End restaurant closed in 1996, due to the changing nature of the neighborhood.

For many years the Bloom's brand was maintained by the surviving restaurant in Golders Green in north west London. It was renovated in summer 2007, and served traditional Ashkenazi-style Jewish cuisine (as opposed to many other Kosher restaurants in London which are more influenced by Israeli-style food).

A new Bloom's restaurant opened in Edgware in 2007, but has now closed. Shortly thereafter, the final Bloom's outlet, the Golders Green restaurant, also closed, in summer 2010.

== See also ==
- List of delicatessens
- List of kosher restaurants
- List of restaurants in London
