= Jeff's Gourmet Sausage Factory =

Sausage factory and restaurant in Los Angeles

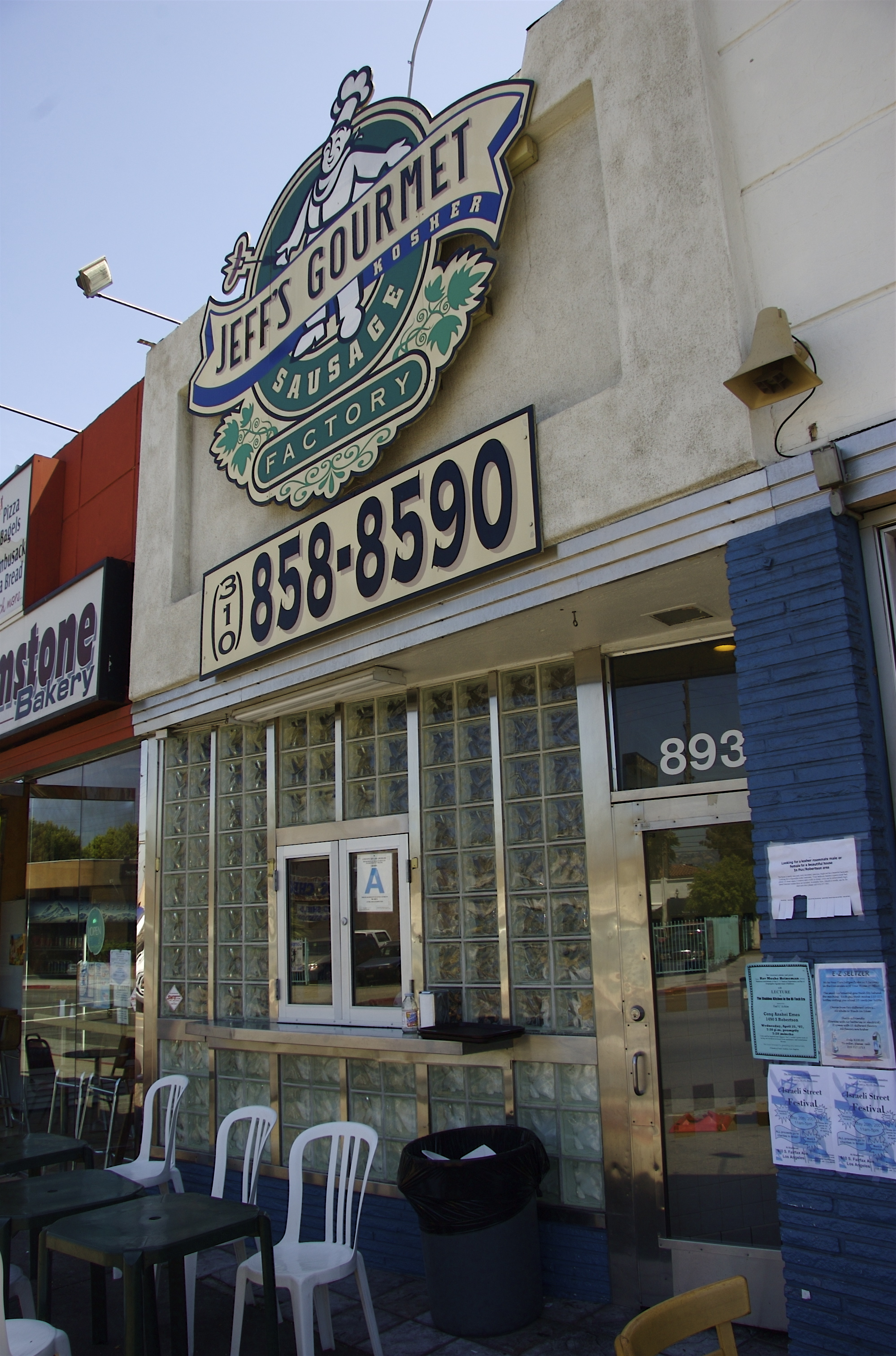
- Restaurant exterior
- Interactive map of Jeff's Gourmet Sausage Factory

Restaurant information
- Established: 1999
- Owner: Jeff Rohatiner
- Food type: Kosher sausages, hamburgers
- Location: 8930 W. Pico Blvd., Los Angeles, California, United States
- Coordinates: 34.0551°N 118.3868°W
- Other locations: Dodger Stadium concession stand
- Website: jeffsgourmet.com

Jeff's Gourmet Sausage Factory is a glatt kosher sausage factory and restaurant in Los Angeles, California. Established in 1999 in a small storefront in the Pico-Robertson district, it serves a variety of Eastern European Jewish– and Mediterranean-style sausages, hamburgers, and deli sandwiches and wraps. All of its meats are prepared in-house.

In 2015, owner Jeff Rohatiner opened the first glatt kosher hot dog stand at Dodger Stadium. Jeff's was able to survive permanent closure during the COVID-19 pandemic by cutting down its menu.

== History ==
=== Initial opening and later years ===
Jeff's Gourmet Sausage Factory is a kosher, fleishig restaurant established in 1999, located in Los Angeles, California, where it is surrounded by many other such restaurants as a part of the Pico-Robertson neighborhood. The eatery was founded by Jeff Rohatiner, who grew up in the Los Angeles Jewish community and earned a degree in hotel management from the University of Nevada, Las Vegas; Rohatiner had had a sausage-making hobby and wanted to allow other kosher-keeping Jews to enjoy the same quality of hot dog as non-Jews. He said he opened his restaurant because "nobody was being creative in the kosher meat business," so he figured that a fresh take on the food would be appreciated in the community. Rohatiner's inspiration also came in part from stories he had heard about his zayde (grandfather), who was known for making delicatessen-style meats.

Rohatiner opened Jeff's Gourmet in a small storefront on Pico Boulevard in the Pico-Robertson Jewish district. Jeff's Gourmet is certified glatt kosher by OK Kosher Certification (OK). In accordance with standard kosher-restaurant policy, Jeff's is closed on Friday afternoon and Shabbat (the Sabbath). While its customer base is largely Orthodox and Modern Orthodox, Jeff's Gourmet also appeals to Conservative and Progressive Jewish families and individuals who may or may not keep kosher.

=== Dodger Stadium concession ===
In July 2015, Rohatiner opened the first glatt kosher hot dog stand at Dodger Stadium of the Los Angeles Dodgers. While Hebrew National hot dogs had previously been sold in the stadium, they do not have the stricter kosher certification preferred by Orthodox customers. Located in the right-field plaza beside Tommy Lasorda's Trattoria, the stand sells hot dogs, jalapeño hot dogs, and sweet Italian sausage sandwiches, along with beer and bottled water. The stand is open during every home game except those that take place on Friday, Shabbat, and Jewish holidays.

A story about the new stand was featured on Los Angeles's local KCAL-TV/KCBS-TV CBS News station, in which Rohatiner was quoted as confirming its certification by a rabbi. The Dodgers' Executive Vice President, Lon Rosen, mentioned that they had had "a lot of fans asking for it, and when fans ask for it, we try to serve our fan base the best we can."

=== Effects of the COVID-19 pandemic ===
The global COVID-19 pandemic greatly affected the sausage factory. After a full five-week-long period of closure, Rohatiner chose to reopen but drastically cut down the menu and seating; attempting to look out for the health of him and his employees, he also decreased hours and staff present for any given shift. Rohatiner noted that it had been "impossible to operate under the circumstances," and he considered not reopening at all. The "roller coaster" of the pandemic forced a transition to a business model that focused more on takeout and delivery options than they ever had before.

The pandemic also made Jeff's unable to provide kosher hot dogs in Dodger Stadium for the 2021 season. The official Major League Baseball website said that "We are unable to offer Jeff's Gourmet until further notice." In June, however, they were able to reopen.

== Menu ==
Jeff's Gourmet's full menu—which was put on hold in 2021—includes a variety of prepared Eastern European– and Mediterranean-style sausages. All of its meats are made in-house, including kielbasa, veal bratwurst, Italian sausage, boerewors sausage, and delicatessen meats such as corned beef, roast beef, salami, and pastrami. Sausages are made from whole cuts of beef, lamb, chicken, turkey, and veal, which are then ground with fruits and spices. Those meats were among the forty-odd that Rohatiner produced, which included fifteen sausages and eight deli-style meats. All sausages are served on buns.

Vacuum-packed prepared sausages were also available for sale. The restaurant provides catering, fulfills mail orders, and sells sausages in bulk. However, due to the COVID-19 pandemic, Rohatiner was forced to cut back; Jeff's made the decision to greatly shrink the menu, going to just seven meats. This shift also saw the end of indoor seating, with takeout and delivery becoming the business's new focus. Only a few outdoor tables remain as the dine-in option.

== Reception ==
Jeff's has received positive reviews in both the Jewish and non-Jewish media. Featured extensively in LA's The Jewish Journal of Greater Los Angeles, Jeff's Gourmet was also the subject of multiple local secular papers' articles, including a 2010 rave review in the Los Angeles Times that spoke passionately about the sausages and sandwiches.

Rohatiner is locally known as a sausage-making expert. In 2022, the Vegas Stats & Information Network included Jeff's in its recommendations for people visiting Los Angeles for Super Bowl LVI.
