= Basil Pizza & Wine Bar =

Restaurant in Brooklyn, New York

- Interactive map of Basil Pizza & Wine Bar

Restaurant information
- Established: 2010
- Closed: 2023
- Location: 270 Kingston Avenue, Brooklyn, Kings, New York, 11213, United States
- Coordinates: 40°40′13″N 73°56′32.5″W

Basil Pizza & Wine Bar was a restaurant in the Crown Heights neighborhood of Brooklyn, New York.

Basil is credited with "ushering in the new era of fine kosher dining in the neighborhood, " so that by 2017 The Jewish Week described Crown Heights as "an eating destination." The menu featured a range of vegetarian and fish dishes, in addition to pizza baked in a wood-fired oven.

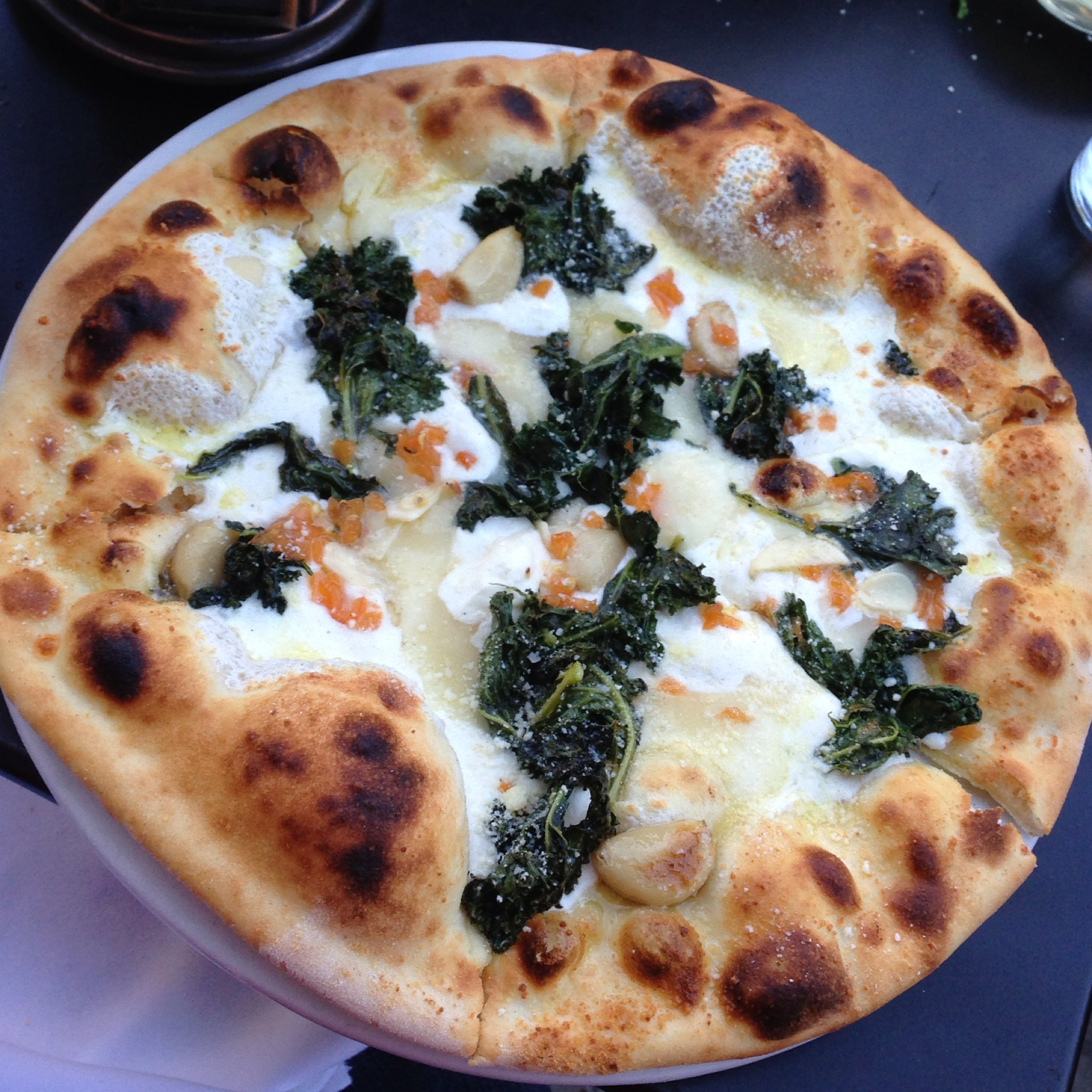
A kale pizza from Basil Pizza & Wine Bar.

Frank Bruni of The New York Times describes Basil, which opened in 2010 on the West Indian side of a neighborhood with a mixed population of Orthodox Jews and immigrants from the West Indies, that was beginning to attract hipsters and upscale purchasers for its fin de siecle row houses, as a "cross-cultural experiment, trying to promote better integration of, and communication between, groups in Crown Heights that haven’t always mingled much or seen eye to eye."

Moshe Wendel was part of the team that opened Basil. The Forward called Wendel, one of the "small band of chefs has led the way in kosher dining, with restaurants that rival their local non-kosher competition."

Daniel Branover was the owner.

== Controversies ==
In February 2017, the owners of Basil's brought the owners of Calabria, a kosher pizza shop set to open directly across the street from them, to Beth Din (rabbinical court). They claimed unfair competition, known as Hasagat Gevul in Jewish law. The court ultimately ruled that Calabria could open, but they were not allowed to serve any specialized pies, including the "Roman-style" pies they had originally advertised. After modifying their recipe to a "New York-Style" pie, Calabria was permitted to open. Calabria closed on September 11, 2019.

In June 2017 OK Kosher removed kosher certification from the restaurant. A back and forth ensued in which Basil claimed the certification was removed for "personal issues" and the OK claiming it was due to contractual failure, but not saying publicly what the issue was. Basil continued to operate for several mounts under the self certification of Menachem Mendel Schneerson, not the late Lubavitch Rebbe whose synagogue and office are just around the corner on Eastern Parkway, but rather a business partner with the same name. In November of the same year they received a new kosher certification from the Orthodox Union.

== Closure ==
In April 2023, Basil announced via their social media that they were temporarily closed and hoping to reopen shortly, But by late June it was reported that they were closing for good.
