= Moshe Wendel =

American chef

- Occupation: Chef

Moshe Wendel is an American chef known for his creative approach to contemporary kosher cooking at Pardes Restaurant, in the Boerum Hill neighborhood of Brooklyn.

== Training and early career ==
Wendel, trained in a Philadelphia culinary apprentice program in Pennsylvania, and worked in cooking in the South of France in Philadelphia area French restaurants including Django and La Bohème.

Wendel and his wife Shana were working at Django, a small, French restaurant in Philadelphia, when they began personally following the Jewish kosher rules in 2008, making it necessary to move to the New York area where there were more opportunities for kosher chefs. Wendel worked at Mosaica in New Jersey before becoming part of the team that opened Basil Pizza & Wine Bar in Crown Heights, Brooklyn, a restaurant known for serving upscale, contemporary food that is kosher.

The Forward describes Wendel as one of the "small band of chefs [who] has led the way in kosher dining, with restaurants that rival their local non-kosher competition."

== Pardes ==
Wendel opened his Pardes Restaurant in October, 2010, together with his wife Shana, telling a reporter that "It’s just like any Brooklyn bistro, it just happens to be kosher." He describes the restaurant as a "seasonal, progressive, French” kosher bistro.

Wendel credits Shana Wendel, who manages the restaurant, with challenging him to make food that is "as good as the stuff I was making when I cooked" non-kosher food. He cites the emphasis on top quality ingredients that they learned while cooking in France as key to great food.

Wendel has become a role model for younger kosher chefs.
