= Kosher airline meal =

Meal served to airline passengers that follows Jewish dietary laws

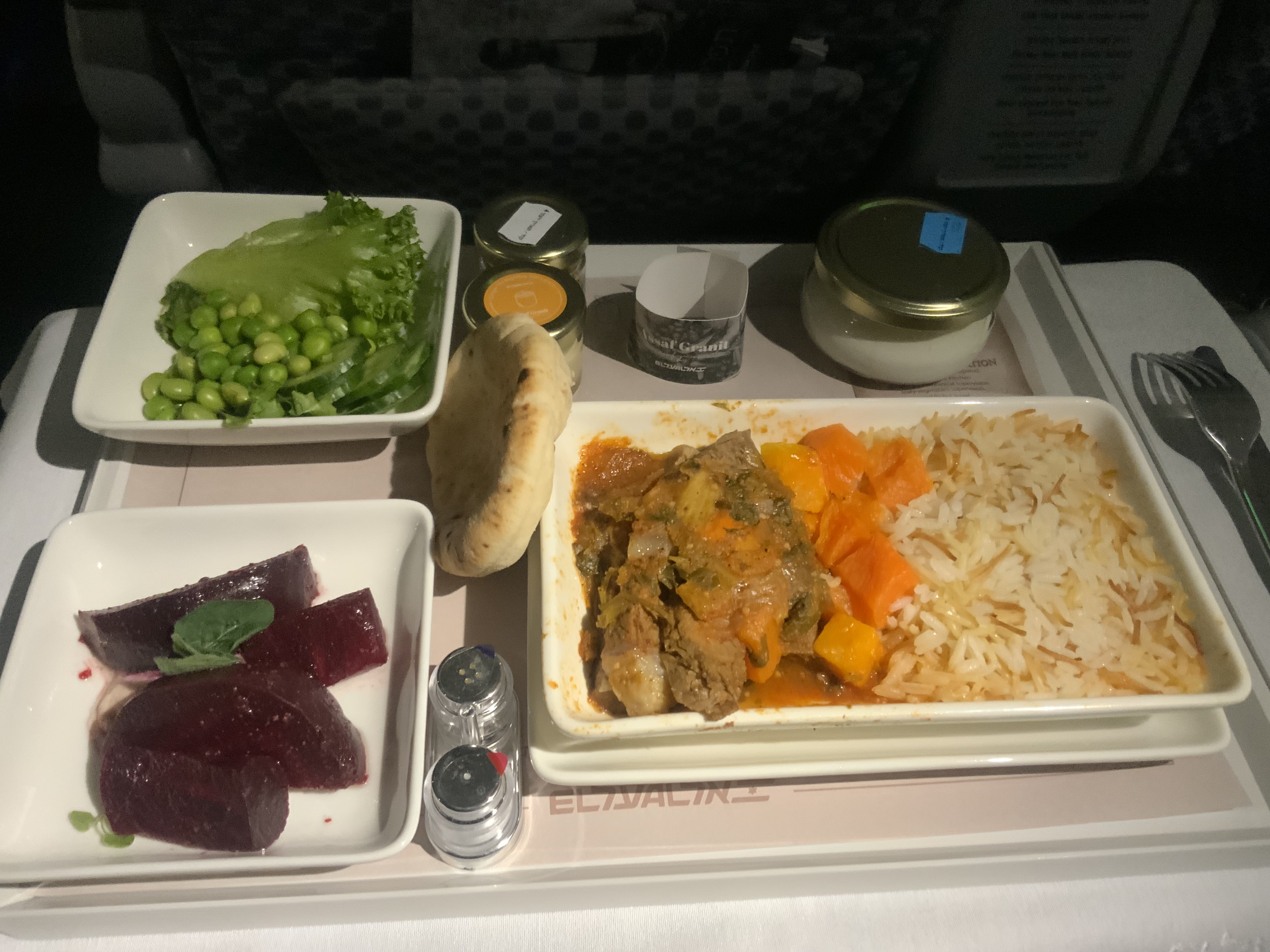
El Al in-flight meal in Business class. Due to its position as Israel's flag carrier, all of El Al's in-flight meals are kosher by default.

A kosher airline meal is an airline meal that conforms to the standards of kashrut. Many airlines offer the option of kosher meals to passengers if ordered in advance. These not only contain food that is kosher, but also other features to aid observant Jews, such as copies of Tefilat HaDerech (the Traveler's Prayer) and prayers that are recited before and after eating and bread on which the mezonot blessing is recited, thereby enabling observant Jews to consume the bread without washing hands.

"Kosher" is one of several options for special meals offered to air travelers. Similarly styled meals that are packaged in double wrapping with verifiable kashrut certification are offered in a variety of other settings, such as cruise ships, hospitals, or catered events. The double wrapping allows for the meals to be heated in a non-kosher oven.

On airlines, kosher meals are the most commonly requested special meal. Kosher meals have become popular even among non-Jewish passengers who perceive kosher foods to be cleaner and healthier. As they cost approximately twice as much as standard meals, airlines may charge more for them.

== History ==
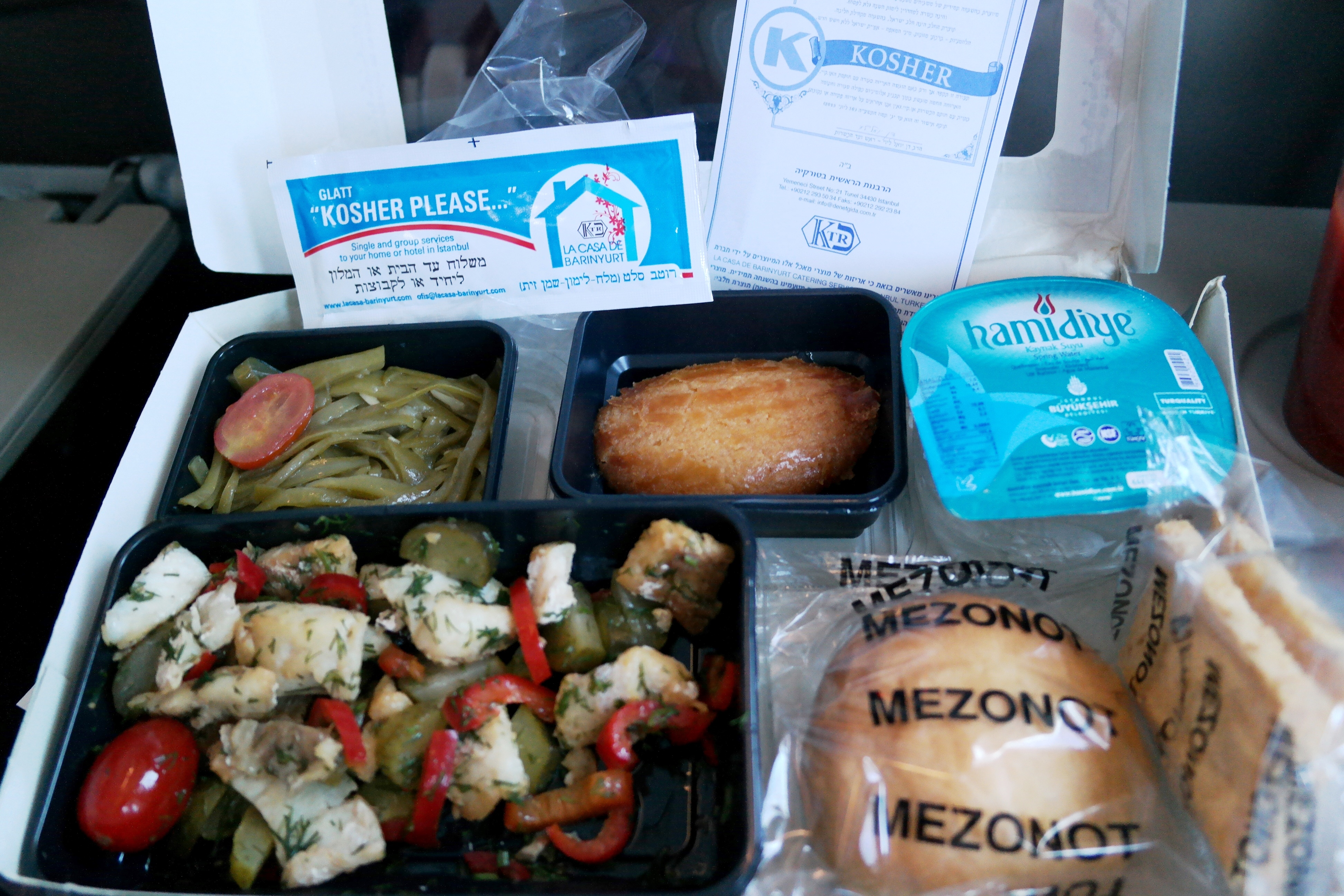
Turkish Airlines kosher airline meal with typical mezonot bread

Kosher airline meals started appearing as an option in the 1960s for Orthodox Jewish travelers.

== Issues ==
Airlines have sometimes been subject to criticism due to their failure to provide kosher meals. American Airlines was fined R$16,000 by a Brazilian court in January 2022 for failing to serve kosher meals on several flights. Air France provided a Jewish family with a meal which was labeled as kosher despite not being kosher in February 2025.

Airline employees who harbor antisemitic views sometimes leave antisemitic messages on the labels of Kosher meals.

Sometimes, dairy and meat foods are mixed by airline employees unaware of the kashrut guideline prohibiting such mixtures, or dairy is served too soon after a meat meal. On Passover, meals containing chametz (bread which has leavened beyond 18 minutes) are sometimes served by mistake.

== Cost ==
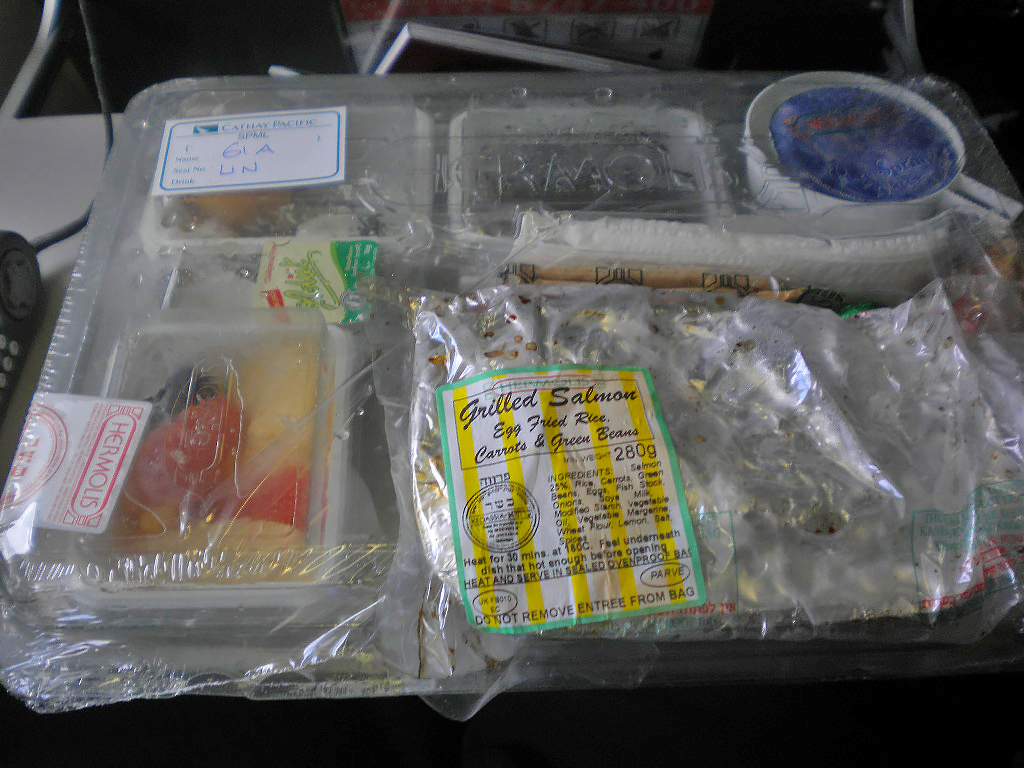
A kosher airline meal offered on a Cathay Pacific flight

Kosher meals cost the airline nearly twice as much as standard meals, even as they are usually offered at no additional cost to the traveler. Smithsonian Magazine has reported that kosher airline meals are the most expensive type of airline meal served.

== See also ==
- Kosher certification agency
- Kosher foods
- Kosher restaurant
