= Knish =

Ashkenazi Jewish and Eastern European baked or fried snack food

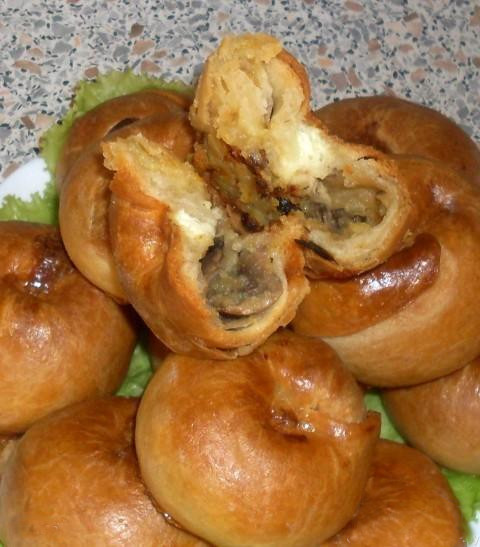
- Knishes with mashed potato and fried onions
- Alternative names: Knysh
- Type: Snack, side dish, finger food
- Place of origin: Eastern Europe
- Region or state: Ukraine, United States, Israel, Argentina, other countries with a significant Ashkenazi Jewish population
- Associated cuisine: Ukrainian cuisine, Ashkenazi Jewish cuisine, Jewish American cuisine, New York City cuisine
- Created by: Ukrainians (original version), Jewish communities in Central and Eastern Europe (modern version)
- Main ingredients: Mashed potatoes, dough, ground meat, sauerkraut, onions, kasha, cheese
- Ingredients generally used: Beef, chicken, sweet potatoes, black beans, spinach
- Variations: Baked or deep-fried; round, rectangular, or square; fully enclosed or open-topped
- Similar dishes: Pirozhki, bourekas

A knish or knysh (/kəˈnɪʃ/ or /knɪʃ/, Ukrainian: книш) is a traditional food of Eastern European origin, characteristic of Ukrainian and Ashkenazi Jewish cuisine. It typically consists of a filling covered with dough that is baked or sometimes deep-fried.

In most traditional versions, the filling is made entirely of mashed potato, kasha (buckwheat groats), or cheese. Other varieties of fillings include beef, chicken, sweet potatoes, black beans, or spinach.

Knishes may be round, rectangular, or square. They may be entirely covered in dough, or some filling may peek out of the top. Sizes range from those that can be eaten in a single bite as an hors d'oeuvre to sandwich-sized.

== Etymology ==
The word is of Slavic origin (Ukrainian: knysh (книш) and Polish: knysz), the exact origin of which is uncertain. It could be connected to the Greek words κνίσα / κνίση - "smell of roasting meat", ϰνισάριον, or ϰνισάρι; (Note: For Greek words, see Liddell, Scott, Jones, Ancient Greek Lexicon) or from German 'knītsch', knitschеl, knīst. Zygmunt Gloger's Encyklopedia staropolska [Old Polish Encyclopedia] (1900) seconds the German origin:

Knish, a small, round dumpling with a raised edge, lined with fried onions in the center. Karłowicz speculates that the word comes from the German name for the Königsberg roll, knist, and the word knischen, meaning to 'mix the leaven', 'to knead'.

Grimm's German dictionary lists other spellings of the word knischen: *knitschen*, *knüschen*, *knisten*, *knüsten*, *knitschen*, *knüssen*, *knauzen*. It was borrowed into Yiddish from Polish as קניש, knish, and in English it was borrowed from Yiddish.

== In Poland, Ukraine and Belarus ==
The multi-ethnic and multi-confessional Polish–Lithuanian Commonwealth ensured mutual influence of the cultures in the lands of Central and Eastern Europe it covered: Polish, Ukrainian, Lithuanian, Belarusian, Jewish, and Russian cultures.

The ancestor of the knish was a medieval fried vegetable patty or fritter; eventually, it became a stuffed item. In Ukraine, the knysh evolved into a filled yeasted bun, and today it is usually sweet rather than savoury; the Russian cousin to the knish is the pirozhok (пирожóк, plural пирожки́). The traditional food spread to neighbouring countries, migration from which helped spread the food further. Knishes began to be baked (rather than fried) around the same time the potato was popularized in Eastern Europe, and the dough wrapper gradually became more like a pastry than bread.

The traditional Ukrainian knysh could be made both with and without a filling. In Volhynia, a special kind of knysh would be baked before Christmas and decorated with crosses or other symbolic figures, playing an important part in festivities. On Christmas Eve, a knysh was used to meet the guests and accompanied kutia, the traditional festive food. One or several knyshes would be put near a didukh, where they remained for two weeks until the end of the holidays. During Epiphany, it would be used as an attribute of the blessing ceremony by the head of the household. Afterward, a knysh would be given to a priest or shared between the family, with the crust being fed to a cow or other household animals, as it was considered to possess its own "soul". In parts of Ukraine, knyshes would also be baked in memory of a deceased person and brought to churches during wake ceremonies, as well as on memorial days. Small varieties of knysh made from sweet dough would also be given to children singing carols (shchedrivky) on New Year's Eve.

In Ukrainian Galicia, knysh was a daily food of the local population and could have various fillings, such as cabbage and potatoes. Among Boykos from the Carpathian region, knyshes with boiled potato, buckwheat, or cheese were widespread and are still cooked in some places. In Hutsul territories, knyshes without filling were used during confession and on Christmas Eve, meanwhile filled ones would be consumed as ordinary food. In the Ukrainian part of Polesia, knyshes could be baked without a filling or stuffed with various ingredients such as onions, dill, cheese, salo, apples, pears, berries, and poppy seeds. In Chernihiv oblast, knyshes were traditionally baked with hemp seeds. In Dnieper Ukraine, a specialty known as knysh was more similar to a pancake. In modern-day Poltava region during the early 19th century, knyshes were baked from rye and buckwheat dough with an addition of pork lard. There and in nearby Chernihiv region, knyshes were baked by unmarried girls before the New Year and would be used during a ritual of searching for a potential husband.

On May 31, 2022, knysz was included in the Polish List of Traditional Products in the category Confectionery and Bakery Products, described as "a kind of triangular or round pierog made of yeast dough, filled with buckwheat and mushrooms", "with the cross-section showing the structure of the dough filled with filling". They are slightly salty and their taste fragrance is typical of yeast bakery and the fillings used. There is a recorded legend that the name of the town of Knyszyn derives from the word knysz.

== In the United States ==
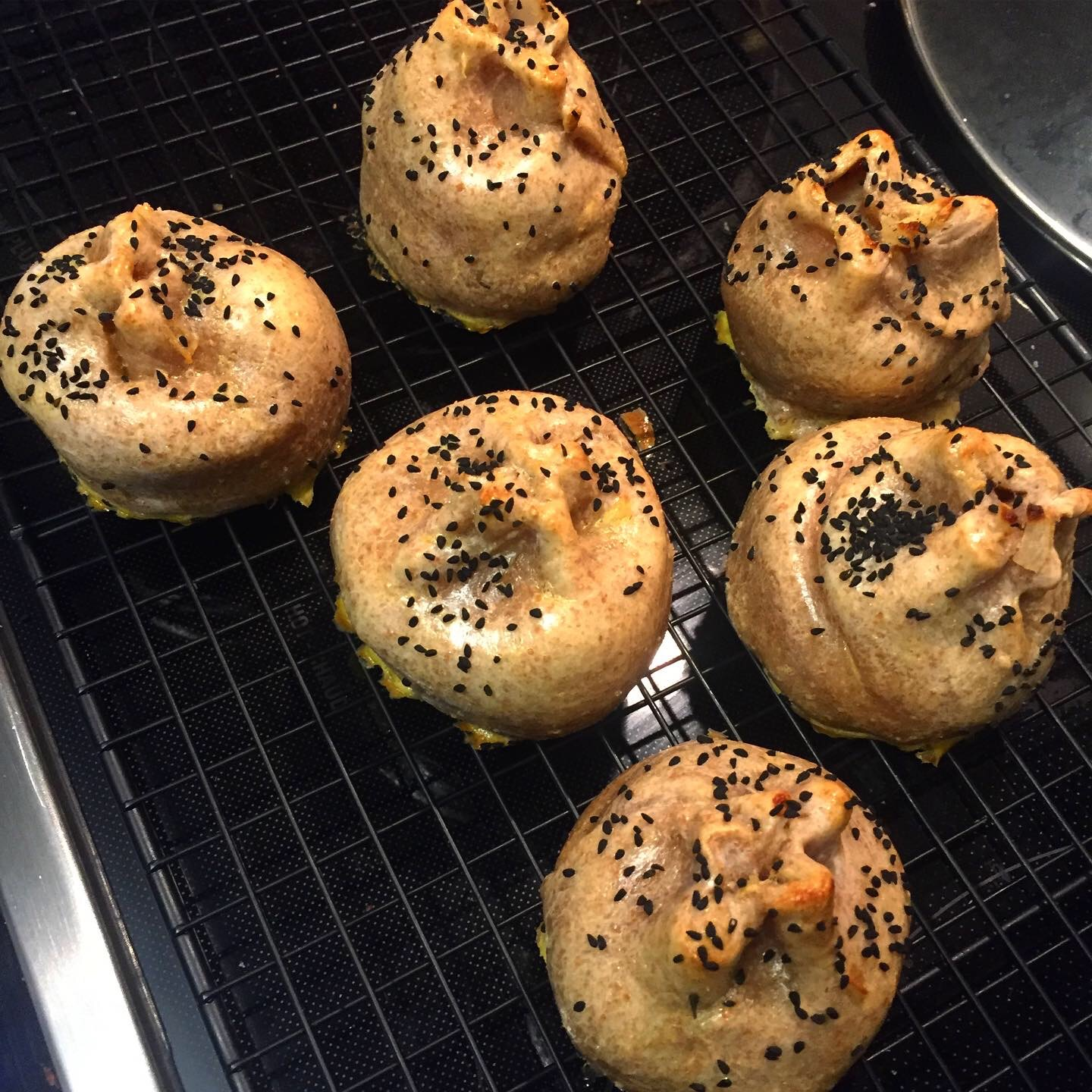
Potato knishes with nigella seed topping.

Ashkenazi Jewish immigrants who arrived sometime around 1900 brought knishes to the United States.

The first knish bakery in America was founded in New York City in 1910. Generally recognized as a food made popular in New York City by Jewish immigrants in the early 20th century, the United States underwent a knish renaissance in the 2000s driven by knish specialty establishments such as Knishes and Dishes in Philadelphia, the Knish Shop in Baltimore, Maryland, Buffalo and Bergen in Washington, DC, or My Mother's Knish, in Westlake Village, California.

In the 20th century, New York City and state politicians portrayed themselves eating knishes to show solidarity with Jewish working-class people. The trend declined after suburbanization and the policies of Ed Koch and Rudy Giuliani that restricted the sale of knishes from food carts.

Knishes are often purchased from street vendors in urban areas with a large Jewish population, sometimes at a hot dog stand, or from a butcher shop. They are still strongly associated with New York City cuisine.

== See also ==
- Baozi – a Chinese steamed bun that can be made with a variety of fillings, such as meat
- Bourekas – Filled turnover in Sephardic Jewish cuisine
- Croquette – Small breaded, deep-fried food
- Turnover – Baked or fried filled good
- Yonah Schimmel's Knish Bakery – Bakery and restaurant located in Manhattan
