= Levana Kirschenbaum =

American restaurateur, caterer, cooking teacher and food writer

Levana Kirschenbaum is an American restaurateur, caterer, cooking teacher and food writer. She is almost always referred to solely by her given name, Levana.

== Childhood, education and personal life ==
Levana was born and reared in Morocco. She studied in France, and immigrated to the United States in 1972. She is married to Maurice Kirschenbaum, they have three children.

== Career ==
Levana has taught kosher cooking classes, written cookbooks, and run a catering service and a bakery, but is probably best known as one of the partners in Levana's Restaurant.

Levana opened a kosher bakery on the Upper West Side of Manhattan in 1976.

== Restaurant ==
Levana’s was a fine dining restaurant in Manhattan, now defunct after more than thirty years in business.

Levana’s was credited with "pioneering" the category of fine dining for a kosher observant clientele.

The restaurant, located in Manhattan's Lincoln Square neighborhood, opened in the 1970s and was owned and operated by the Kirschenbaum family, including its namesake, Levana Kirschenbaum, her husband Maurice, his brother Sol, and a third brother. The manager was Sol Kirschenbaum.

== Cookbooks ==
- Levana Cooks
- Lévana's Table: Kosher Cooking for Everyone (Stewart, Tabori & Chang, 2002)
- Lévana Cooks DairyFree!
- The Whole Foods Kosher Kitchen: Glorious Meals Pure and Simple
