= Kosher restaurant =

Restaurant serving food permissible in Jewish dietary law

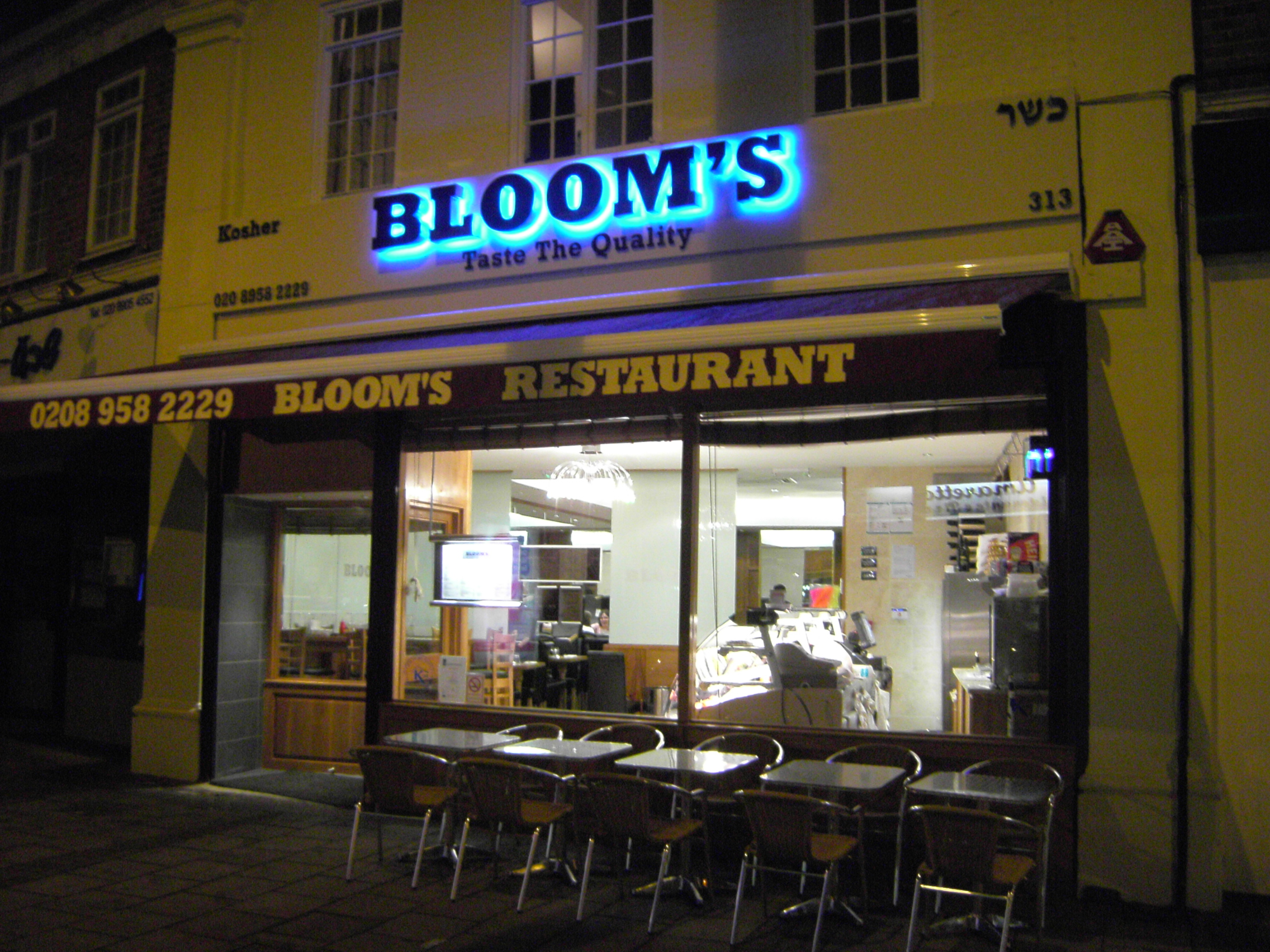
Until its last branch closed in summer 2010, Bloom's restaurant was the longest-standing kosher restaurant in England.

A kosher restaurant or kosher deli is an establishment that serves food that complies with Jewish dietary laws (kashrut). These businesses, which also include diners, cafés, pizzerias, fast food, and cafeterias, and are frequently in listings together with kosher bakeries, butchers, caterers, and other similar places, differ from kosher-style businesses in that they operate under rabbinical supervision, which requires the observance of the laws of kashrut, as well as certain other Jewish laws, including the separation of meat and dairy.

Such locations must be closed during Shabbat and Jewish holidays if under Jewish ownership. In most cases, a kosher establishment is limited to serving exclusively either dairy (milchig) or meat (fleishig) foods.

Some types of businesses, such as delicatessens, frequently serve both, kept in separate areas. Vegetarian (pareve) kosher restaurants serve only vegetarian fare.

== Types of kosher restaurants ==
=== Dairy (milchig) restaurants ===
Kosher dairy restaurants began to emerge in modern Europe and then 19th century America, primarily in New York. Descended from the milchhallen or "milk pavilions" of Europe, they popped up in the Jewish immigrant community of the Lower East Side in the late 19th, where there were at once hundreds of dairy restaurants.

Due to rules about milk and meat in Jewish law, kosher dairy restaurants do not serve meat. Their offerings may include dairy products, such as cheese and milk. Milchig restaurants may, and often do, serve fish, eggs, vegetarian and vegan dishes, and other foods classified as "pareve" under kosher rules. In the U.S., there have been many kosher pizza restaurants.

=== Meat (fleishig) restaurants ===
Kosher fleishig (meat) establishments often serve meat dishes popular within Middle Eastern cuisine, such as shawarma, along with common American fast-food staples like hot dogs and hamburgers. Fish is also frequently served at fleishig restaurants, though Orthodox kosher rules stipulate that fish should not be served on the same plate as meat.

Kosher Chinese restaurants are also common. These are mostly either fleishig or vegetarian (serving only pareve food).

In recent years, a tradition has developed in Jewish communities to eat Chinese food on Christmas Day (and Christmas Eve), as many Chinese restaurants are open on these days. This phenomenon is the subject of the song "Chinese Food on Christmas."

=== Pareve and vegan restaurants ===
In the 21st century, there has been an increase in vegan restaurants that, among other things, deliberately cater to the needs of Jews who keep kosher. In the New York area, in particular, there are a growing number of restaurants with a kashrut certification as pareve. This label means that they must not contain any meat or dairy (e.g., cheese) products, though it does allow for fish and eggs.

Some Orthodox Jewish authorities reportedly treat strictly vegan restaurants as kosher, absent a certificate. In May 2023, vegan restaurants gained a similar vote of approval by Conservative Judaism's Committee on Jewish Law and Standards. The committee ruled that the kashrut restriction on cooking by gentiles does not apply to restaurants and that Jews may follow kashrut while eating at an unsupervised vegan or vegetarian restaurant, as long as (1) they do not eat there on the Sabbath, (2) nor on Saturday nights, preferably, and (3) avoid weeks near Passover, and (4) exclude eating fish at unsupervised vegetarian restaurants. The ruling also specified that Jews are permitted to eat at Indian restaurants that have images or statues of Hindu deities.

Israel has a vibrant veganism movement, including Orthodox spokesman Asa Keisar, with more than 500 vegan restaurants, which are seen as "naturally kosher" even without a certificate.

=== Standalone restaurants and franchises ===
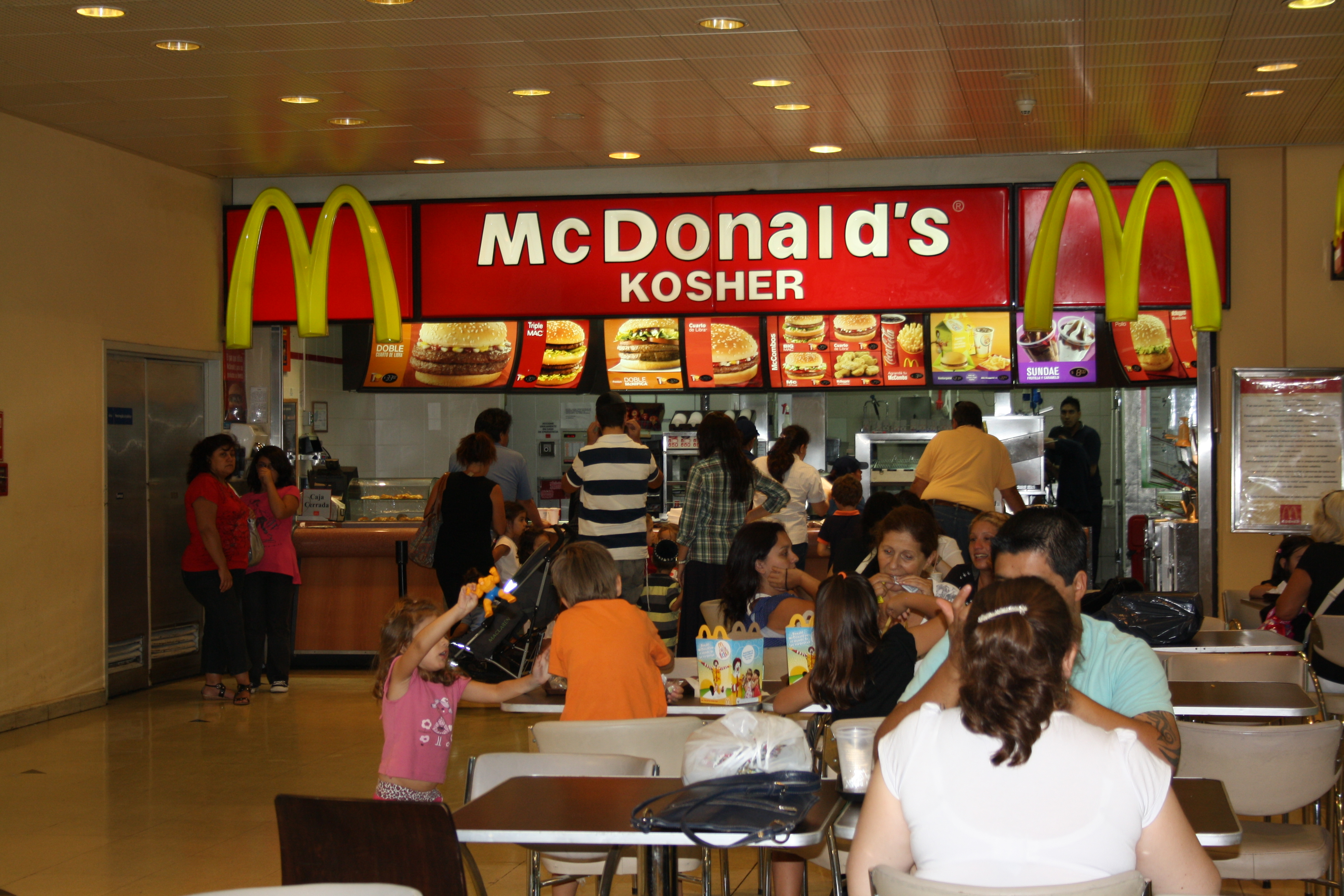
Kosher McDonald's in Buenos Aires, Argentina.

While most kosher restaurants are small businesses operating only a single location, some operate multiple locations within a city (often in New York City). Some corporate restaurants and fast food chains operate kosher locations in places with Jewish populations.

In Israel, kosher McDonald's, and Sbarro franchises can be found. In the United States, there are many kosher Dunkin' Donuts, Krispy Kreme and Subway locations. Most kosher Subways had failed by 2011, and some of these locations must modify their typical menus in order to comply with Jewish dietary laws.

Among other major corporate chains, Baskin-Robbins ice cream is kosher at all locations, certified by the Vaad Hakashrut of Massachusetts, with most flavors kosher. Rita's Italian Ice operates some locations under rabbinical supervision, in states such as Maryland, New Jersey, New York, and Pennsylvania.

== Distribution of restaurants ==
Areas with large Jewish populations, such as Jerusalem, New Jersey and Toronto, Ontario, Canada, are described as having many kosher restaurants, while other areas such as Dublin, Ireland may be lacking.

In the United States, New York City has the highest number of kosher restaurants, and in Canada, Toronto has the most. As of 2017, there were over 500 kosher restaurants in the New York area. Locations such as Philadelphia also have relatively small numbers of certified kosher restaurants.

In cities with smaller Jewish populations, kosher dining is often limited to just a single establishment. Some cities do not have any kosher dine-in facilities, but small communities have other arrangements for Jewish residents to obtain ready-made kosher meals and other types of food that may be hard to obtain otherwise.

In 2019, about 30 of the roughly 55,000 restaurants then using OpenTable were reported as suitable for a diner observing strict kashrut. The platform’s Orthodox Jewish chief technology officer, Joseph Essas, said he sometimes had sealed kosher airline meals brought into non-kosher restaurants for business meetings.

== Rules and holidays ==
A kosher restaurant serves food that complies with Jewish dietary laws (kashrut). These businesses operate under rabbinical supervision, which requires that the laws of kashrut, as well as certain other Jewish laws, must be observed. Among those laws, the meat and dairy cannot be mixed, and grape products made by non-Jews cannot be consumed.

Pork and shellfish cannot be served, and animals must be slaughtered by a certified shochet, frequently a rabbi. In most cases, the location is limited to serving exclusively either dairy or meat foods. But some types of establishments, such as delicatessens, frequently serve both, kept in separate areas.

Such locations must be closed during Jewish holidays if under Jewish ownership. For example, kosher restaurants are closed from Friday evening to Saturday evening for Shabbat. In the New York area, many kosher restaurants close over the eight days of Passover as "a matter of practicality," as staying open requires that no yeast-related products be used. The restaurants must also be thoroughly cleaned of yeast residue to be opened for Passover.

According to the Wall Street Journal, more New York kosher restaurants in recent years have remained open on Passover, including both casual and fine-dining locations.

== Kosher cuisine ==
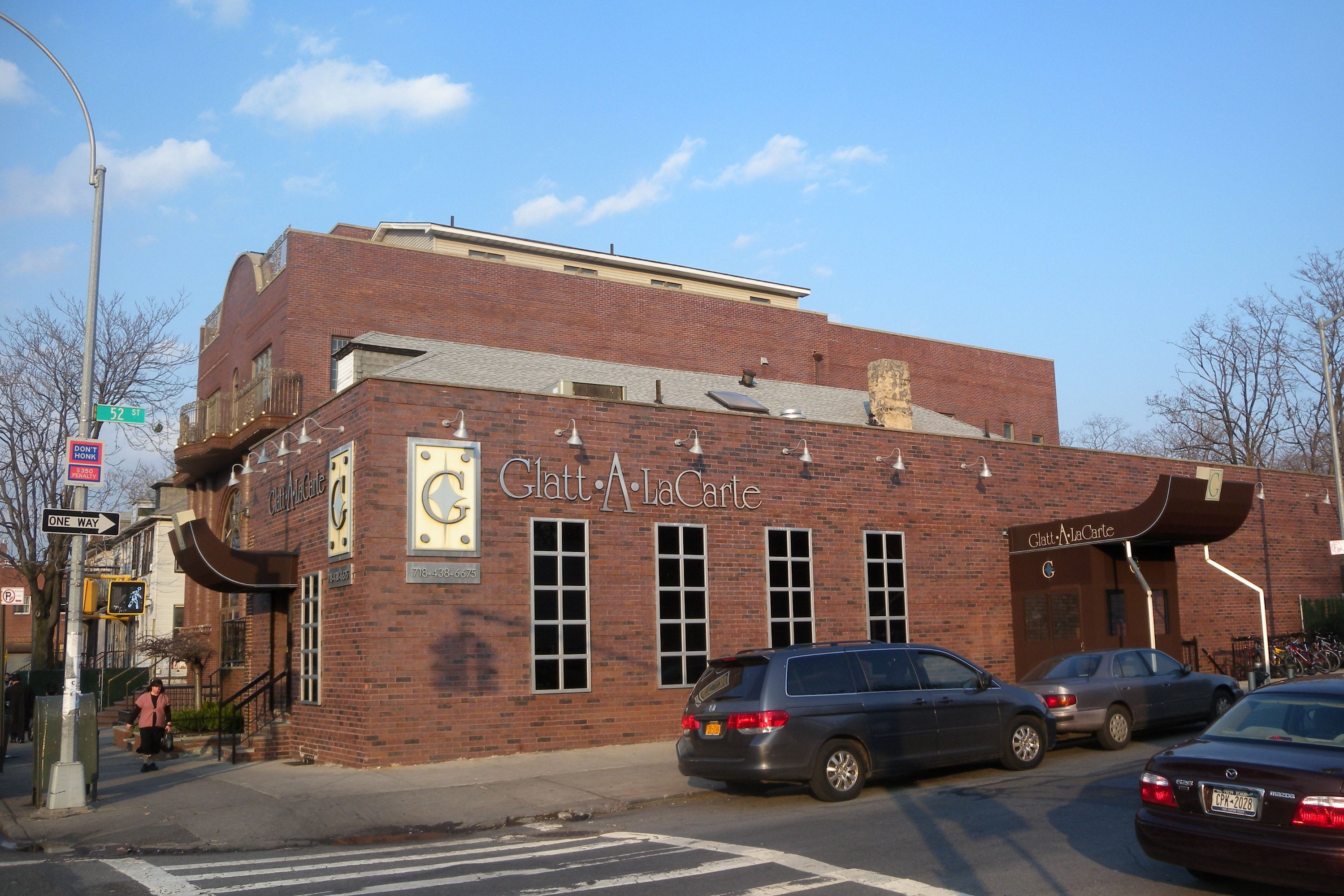
A kosher restaurant in Borough Park, Brooklyn

Because many foods (excluding among others pork or shellfish) can be kosher as long as food is prepared heeding Jewish laws, there are "kosher steakhouses, kosher pizzerias, kosher fish joints, kosher Indian restaurants, kosher Thai places," and other sorts.

Unlike in the general population, where many restaurants and fast food businesses specialize in a particular type of food, many kosher establishments have a variety of different types of popular food. Many kosher delicatessens exist that serve both milchig (dairy) and fleishig (meat) foods that are kept separate.

=== Dairy (milchig) dishes ===
Dairy items include sliced cheeses and cream cheese. Many pareve items and fish items are also served, such as smoked whitefish salad and herring.

Pizza is a popular food served at kosher restaurants, but kosher pizza shops typically also serve Middle Eastern cuisine, such as falafel, and other foods that can be served with dairy, such as fish and pasta. Some locations also have the menus common at pizza shops.

Bagel shops are also common, serving bagels and cream cheese with lox and a variety of other spreads. At kosher bagel shops, salads may also be served.

== Other kosher businesses ==
Many cities with Jewish communities also have kosher grocery stores. These can range in size from a corner store, similar in style to a delicatessen, or a full-sized supermarket similar in appearance to a big box store. As of 2010, the largest such store in the United States is Seven Mile Market in the Baltimore suburb of Pikesville.

Corporate supermarket chains also sometimes have "kosher" sections inside their locations in Jewish areas that specialize in food that is popular among religiously observant Jews.

Kosher cafeterias and food stands can sometimes be found at college and university campuses, Jewish community centers, hospitals, professional sports stadiums, and some tourist attractions. In some of these locations where special stands do not exist, prepackaged kosher sandwiches and other meals are offered, or can be pre-ordered. Some airlines also offer kosher meals when ordered in advance.

== Controversies ==
With kashrut being a very sensitive issue, there have been many controversies surrounding the kosher-dining industry.

=== Errors ===
In 1990, a planned kosher fundraising meal aboard a ship on the Baltimore Inner Harbor contained non-kosher food due to lack of business planning. The mix-up was caused by a kosher and a non-kosher caterer under the same ownership.

=== Dropping of certification ===
Occasionally, an establishment operating as kosher will make the choice to drop its certification and become non-kosher.

One such instance was a Dunkin in Rockville, Maryland (a suburb of Washington, D.C.), which made the decision to be non-kosher in 2007 in order to offer menu items sold at non-kosher Dunkin' Donuts locations (such as ham). This led to a protest. Dunkin' Donuts still has several other kosher locations in the Greater Washington and Baltimore area.

In 2024, the kosher cafe was decertified in Australia, prompting an accusation of racism by the owner, an Ethiopian Jew.

=== Governmental enforcement in the United States of Kosher laws ===
In some U.S. states and other jurisdictions, laws have been passed that mandate establishments that claim to be kosher to actually comply with Jewish dietary laws. These jurisdictions sometimes employ rabbis to aid in enforcing these laws. Some of these laws, including one in New York State, have been overturned by courts on constitutional grounds.

The more recent trend for these laws is simply to allow the establishment to disclose its own kashrut standards, with the governmental authority then scrutinizing whether the establishment in fact lives by the kashrut standards it discloses. This approach appears to overcome the Establishment Clause issue successfully.

== See also ==
- Appetizing store
- Kosher style - restaurants that mimic some aspects of kosher laws, but are not actually kosher.
- Kosher airline meal
- List of kosher restaurants
- Chinese cuisine in Jewish culture in the United States
- 1902 Kosher Meat Boycott
