= Lokshen mit kaese =

Traditional Ashkenazi Jewish egg noodle dish similar to macaroni and cheese

- Alternative names: Lokshen with cheese, lokshen with cottage cheese, Jewish egg noodles with cottage cheese, Jewish mac and cheese, itriyot v’gvina, lokshyn mit kaese, lockshen noodles with cheese
- Type: Cheese noodles
- Course: Main
- Place of origin: Jewish from Eastern Europe. Today mostly in Israel, the United States, France, Canada, United Kingdom, Australia, Argentina, South Africa, and other communities in the Jewish diaspora.
- Created by: Ashkenazi Jews
- Serving temperature: Warm
- Main ingredients: Lokshen noodles, cottage cheese or farmers cheese, salt, black pepper, less commonly butter, cream cheese, parmesan cheese, sour cream, cinnamon sugar, caramelized onions
- Variations: Lokshen kugel

Lokshen mit kaese (in Yiddish: Lokshn mit kez לאָקשן מיט קעז, Makaronen mit kez מאקאראָנען מיט קעז, or Mak-mit-Kez מאק־מיט־קעז; in Hebrew: itriyot ve gvinah איטריות וגבינה), also known as lokshen with cheese or Jewish mac and cheese, is an Ashkenazi Jewish dish popular in the Jewish diaspora, particularly in the United States. It consists of lokshen (or Jewish egg noodles) that are served with a cheese sauce — typically made with cottage cheese and black pepper (sometimes farmers cheese may be used in place of the cottage cheese) — and sour cream. Butter, caramelized onions, garlic, tomatoes, mint, currants, parmesan, and other ingredients may be added depending on the region and season. Sometimes a sweet variety is made with cinnamon sugar. It has been compared to a deconstructed noodle kugel and is considered by many to be a Jewish comfort food.

== Etymology ==
Lokshen mit kaese comes from the almost identical Yiddish term for the dish, Lokshn mit kez, meaning Lokshen (Jewish egg noodles) with cheese.

== History ==
"For generations before me, Jews across Central and Eastern Europe shared my devotion to starch and cream, serving egg noodles mixed with pot cheese as a quick, satisfying meal. Like many weeknight dishes, the recipe for lokshen mit kaese, as it is called in Yiddish, was budget-friendly, alluringly homey, and effortless. As Arthur Schwartz writes in his book Jewish Home Cooking: Yiddish Recipes Revisited, it is a dish you cook “when you think there’s nothing in the house to eat.” Seasoned in the Litvak manner with a copious sprinkle of salt and pepper, as Schwartz enjoys it, or dusted with sugar in the Galitzianer tradition, noodles and pot cheese is Jewish comfort food par excellence." — Leah Koenig

According to the late Jewish culinary historian Rabbi Gil Marks, lokshen mit kaese originated more than 800 years ago in the Jewish communities of Eastern Europe sometime during the Middle Ages as a relative of the lokshen kugel, and was a relatively cheap meal for the then impoverished Jewish population of the shtetl. The Lithuanian Jews preferred a savory version of the dish seasoned with salt and pepper while the Polish Jews preferred a sweet version of the dish sprinkled with sugar and sometimes cinnamon. When Jews fled from the escalating antisemitism and pogroms in Eastern Europe and sought refuge in the United States and other countries in the Jewish diaspora, as well as in Israel, they brought this dish with them. Lokshen mit kaese remained popular in the American Jewish community, though beginning in the late 20th century it began to decrease in popularity due to a growing mistrust of saturated fat due to its possible health effects, and a general desire to move away from old-fashioned tastes.

Today lokshen mit kaese remains popular and is considered a comfort food comparable to macaroni and cheese for many American Jews, some of whom introduced new ingredients into the dish such as Italian pasta, butter, parmesan cheese, mint, cherry tomatoes and currants, among others.

== Overview ==
"My mom actually managed to [cook when I was growing up], which was amazing because she was the primary breadwinner. She was a big muckety muck in the nursing world, and she eventually ran a school of nursing out of the St. Barnabas hospital in Livingston. So she had kind of kooky hours, but she still managed to be the mom who came home and cooked dinner. She was actually a very good cook. A lot of it was not traditional Jewish food, but on holidays certainly the Passover plate was the Passover Plate, and Hanukkah was latkes, and flanken was very big in our house. She made a dish, I can’t remember what she called it, but it was bowtie egg noodles with pot cheese, much moister than the buckwheat. That was one of our favorites. She was a terrific cook. I say was, she’s still alive at 93." — Jason Alexander

Two main types of the dish exist, a savory and a sweet. Both are typically made with lokshen noodles along with cottage cheese, sour cream and sometimes butter. The savory version of lokshen mit kaese usually includes salt, pepper and caramelized onions. While the sweet version is topped with cinnamon and sugar similar to a noodle kugel. Melissa Clark makes a variation with mint, cherry tomatoes, scallions and dried currants.

== Preparation ==
Lokshen mit kaese is typically prepared by boiling a variety of lokshen or Jewish egg noodles. Traditionally longer homemade lokshen egg noodles were and are still sometimes used, however store bought lokshen as well as varnishkes also known as bowtie pasta are a popular choice as well, sometimes various shapes of Italian pasta such as macaroni elbows are used as well. The Jewish egg noodles are boiled until al dente and then mixed with cottage or pot cheese, and sometime butter, cream cheese, parmesan cheese, shallots, garlic, chive, or other ingredients may be added, along with a fair amount of cracked black pepper. Sometimes it is made with broad lokshen and served with ketchup.

== In popular culture ==
- Lokshen mit kaese is used as a Yiddish slang phrase equivalent to hunky dory, or "everything is easy".
- Lokshen mit kaese is mentioned in a song listing Jewish foods during the 2013 Broadway play When You're in Love the Whole World is Jewish by Jason Alexander, who has said the dish is a childhood favorite of his, based on the 1963 comedy album by Bob Booker and George Foster.

== See also ==
- Lokshen kugel
- Jewish penicillin
- Kasha varnishkes
- Ashkenazi Jewish cuisine
- Kugel
- Kugel yerushalmi
- Shabbat meals
