= Lokshen =

Traditional Ashkenazi Jewish egg noodle

- Alternative names: Jewish egg noodles, itriyot, lockshen, locshen, lokshyn, lockshen noodles
- Type: Noodle or pasta
- Place of origin: Jewish from Eastern Europe. Today mostly in Israel, the United States, France, Canada, United Kingdom, Australia, Argentina, South Africa, and other communities in the Jewish diaspora.
- Region or state: Eastern Europe
- Associated cuisine: Jewish, Israeli
- Created by: Ashkenazi Jews
- Main ingredients: Eggs, flour, salt, less commonly whole wheat flour, cooking oil, potato starch, matzo meal, rice flour, spelt flour
- Variations: Farfel

Lokshen (Yiddish: לאָקשן, lokshn), also known as Itriyot (Hebrew: איטריות), locshen, lockshen, or Jewish egg noodles, is the common name of a range of Ashkenazi Jewish egg noodles that are commonly used in a variety of Jewish dishes including chicken soup, kugel, kasha varnishkes, lokshen mit kaese, and as a side dish to Jewish brisket, sweet and sour meat balls, apricot chicken, and many other dishes. They may also be served with melted butter or a simple tomato sauce. In the United States, lokshen are also used as the basis for various casseroles and baked dishes including tuna noodle casserole, and both sweet and savory lokshen kugels.

== History ==
Jews eat lots of lokshen on Shabbat because noodles are symbolic of the unity of the people of Israel: They are so tangled that they can never be separated.

— Rabbi Pinchas of Koretz

=== Origins ===
Noodles are mentioned in the Jerusalem Talmud (Hallah 57d, Beitza 60d), which was published circa 350 CE, these were the first clear mentions of boiled noodles in general outside China according to food historian Charles Perry. Chinese noodles spread via the Silk Road to Persia where they entered the local cuisine around the 5th century CE, and Jewish merchants played a prominent role in the Silk Road trade. Noodles are later mentioned around this time in the Babylonian Talmud as "rihata" (probably related to "reshteh"), a word of Persian origin. Noodles were popular among the Jews of the Middle East during the first millennium CE period, and remained popular among the Sephardi Jewish population when they were later introduced to Italy, Spain, and Southern Europe. Pasta was popular among the Sephardi and Italian Jews, and later was popular among the French Jews of Provence which had a notable population in the 12th century CE. Mizrahi Jews also had numerous noodle varieties of their own during the first millennium as well.

=== Early history ===
The definitive Ashkenazi noodle, lokshen, was the confluence of both Central Asian and Provençal by way of Germany influences. According to Jewish food historian Rabbi Gil Marks, lokshen noodles were first made sometime around the 13th century.

=== Modern history ===
In Israel, lokshen as the term for "Jewish egg noodle" fell out of use in Hebrew by the mid-20th century due to the efforts of Eliezer Ben-Yehuda, who in 1908 suggested replacing lokshen with the word "itriyot," deriving from Judeo-Arabic via the Greek word itrion, a word which slowly overtook lokshen in the Hebrew lexicon and by which they are still known today.

== Overview ==
=== Brands ===
There are many brands of lokshen around the world. Common North American brands include Manischewitz, No Yolks, Gefen, Kemach, Heimishe, and Greenblatt's. Israeli brands of lokshen (more commonly known as itriyot) include Osem and Meshubach. British brands of lokshen include Kleinblatt's Pure Egg and Sova Foods. Some European brands of lokshen such as Sova Foods sell their lokshen noodles in a in individual "nests", similar to Chinese noodles. There are also various private-label brands offering lokshen.

== Types ==
=== Extra-fine ===
Extra-fine lokshen consist of very fine noodles similar in thickness to vermicelli, though they are often even thinner. They are very fragile and due to their fragility they are almost exclusively used in chicken soup, matzo ball soup, and other Jewish soups.

=== Fine ===
Fine lokshen are similar to extra-fine; however, they are slightly thicker and are more similar in thickness to vermicelli or angel hair pasta, though they sometimes are thicker than the aforementioned varieties. Like extra-fine lokshen, these are typically used in various soups; however, many people also use them in various lokshen kugels as the fine texture of the lokshen noodles creates a more dense consistency in kugel.

=== Medium ===
Medium lokshen are much thicker than fine egg noodles, and are somewhat similar to pappardelle or Chinese egg noodles, though medium egg noodles have a somewhat richer flavor due to the liberal amount of egg yolks traditionally used in their production. When boiled, medium lokshen are flat and are not wavy or curly like the varieties mentioned below. Medium Jewish egg noodles are mainly used to serve on their own dressed with a simple sauce or butter as a side dish, or they are used in a lokshen kugel; often sweet but sometimes savory varieties use medium lokshen.

=== Wide ===
Wide lokshen are the most-commonly found variety of lokshen, and unlike the aforementioned varieties of lokshen, wide lokshen are somewhat curly and are not flat after cooking unlike medium lokshen. They are mainly used for lokshen kugel and other noodle casseroles like tuna noodle casserole. They are favored by some for use in noodle kugel as their width and curly texture allow the cheese or whatever accompaniment within the kugel to remain distinct from the lokshen itself and not become one contiguous dense mass, which some people prefer. Medium and fine lokshen often absorb more of the kugel batter and make more dense kugels.

=== Extra-wide ===
Extra-wide lokshen are more curly than wide lokshen, and are somewhat wider as well. These are less popular for use in lokshen kugel due to their broad width and curly shape, however they are sometimes used in lokshen kugel. These are most commonly served as a side dish on their own or with a simple butter, margarine, or tomato-based sauce.

=== Broad ===
Broad lokshen are similar to extra-wide except they are even wider and curlier than extra-wide lokshen and as their name suggests are the broadest variety of lokshen.

=== Varnishkes ===
Varnishkes are a variety of lokshen that are similar in shape to bow tie pasta, except there are differences in terms of their preparation as they are made with plain flour instead of semolina, and have a higher quantity of egg yolks as is typical of Jewish egg noodles. These are used in the Jewish dish kasha varnishkes, which consists of varnishkes that are prepared with buckwheat kasha and caramelised onions.

=== Passover version ===
Various kosher for passover versions of lokshen noodles are made during the spring around Passover and are either made at home, or commercially produced by various brands such as Manischewitz. Kosher for Passover varieties of lokshen are typically made with potato starch in place of the usual flour, which is not permissible for consumption during Passover according to traditional Jewish law.

=== Square ===
In the Jewish diaspora this shape is often called "egg flakes" and is sold by brands such as Gefen and Kleinblatt's. It is most often used for soup or served to children with butter. There is an Israeli variety of square lokshen sold by brands such Meshubach, consisting of small square shape lokshen that is popular with children and for use in soups.

=== Farfel ===
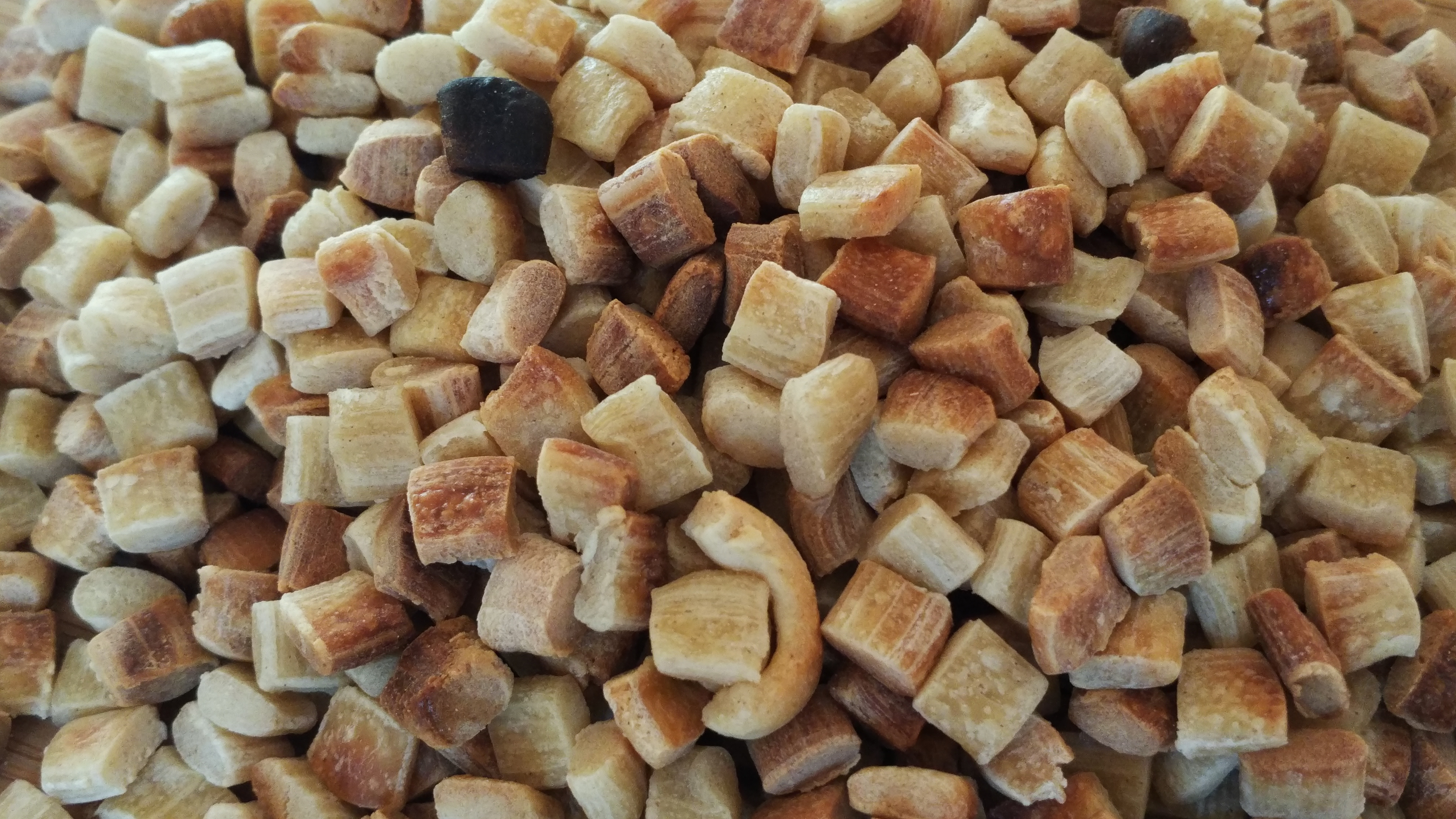
Farfel, a Jewish noodle similar to lokshen

Farfel (Yiddish: פֿאַרפֿל, romanized: farfl; from Middle High German: varveln) is small pellet- or flake-shaped pasta used in Ashkenazi Jewish cuisine. It is made from egg noodle dough and is frequently toasted before being cooked. It can be served in soups or as a side dish. In the United States, it can also be found pre-packaged as egg barley.

== In popular culture ==
- Lokshen became a slang term in Yiddish culture; the phrase "schtaffen mit lokchen" means "to stuff with noodles," that is, to feed someone an empty food, which was considered an offence in Ashkenazi Jewish culture and this was metaphorically carried over to Israeli culture as a common Hebrew expression, as to feed someone "lokshim" means to give wrong information to intentionally confuse someone. The Hebrew phrase "ma'akhil lokshim" literally translates to "feeding lies", the expression persisted and was recently augmented with the variation, "to sell lokshim" or "limkor lokshim" with the same meaning.

== See also ==
- Lokshen kugel
- Kasha varnishkes
- Ashkenazi Jewish cuisine
- Kugel
- Yerushalmi Kugel
- Shabbat meals
