= Yapchik =

Jewish potato and beef casserole

- Type: Casserole
- Course: Main course
- Place of origin: Israel, Jewish diaspora
- Region or state: Jewish diaspora
- Created by: Hungarian Jews, Polish Jews
- Serving temperature: Warm
- Main ingredients: Potatoes, onions, flanken, brisket

Yapchik is a potato-based Ashkenazi Jewish meat dish similar to both cholent and kugel, and of Hungarian Jewish and Polish Jewish origin. It is considered a comfort food, and yapchik has increased in popularity over the past decade, especially among members of the Orthodox Jewish community in North America.

== Overview ==
Yapchik, somewhat similar to a kugel, consists of a layer of meat, typically beef flanken or brisket that has been enveloped between two layers of a mixture similar to a potato kugel, containing shredded potatoes and onions, along with beaten eggs, spices, and matzo meal, and then left to slow-cook for many hours and often overnight. It is a popular dish for Shabbat and many other Jewish holidays.

== Other variations ==
As it is a heimish (homestyle) dish, there are many variations of yapchik including those made with red potatoes, zucchini, or pulled beef.

== In popular culture ==
A restaurant in the predominantly Jewish city of Lakewood, New Jersey, is named after the dish.

== See also ==
- Potatonik
- Cholent
