= Brisket (disambiguation) =

Brisket is a cut of beef coming from the front part of a cow that is used in various dishes.

It may also refer to:

- Brisket (Jewish dish), an Ashkenazi Jewish dish traditionally served for Passover and other Jewish holidays
- Smoked brisket, a Texan dish
