= Potato babka =

Potato and bacon dish found in Belarus and Poland

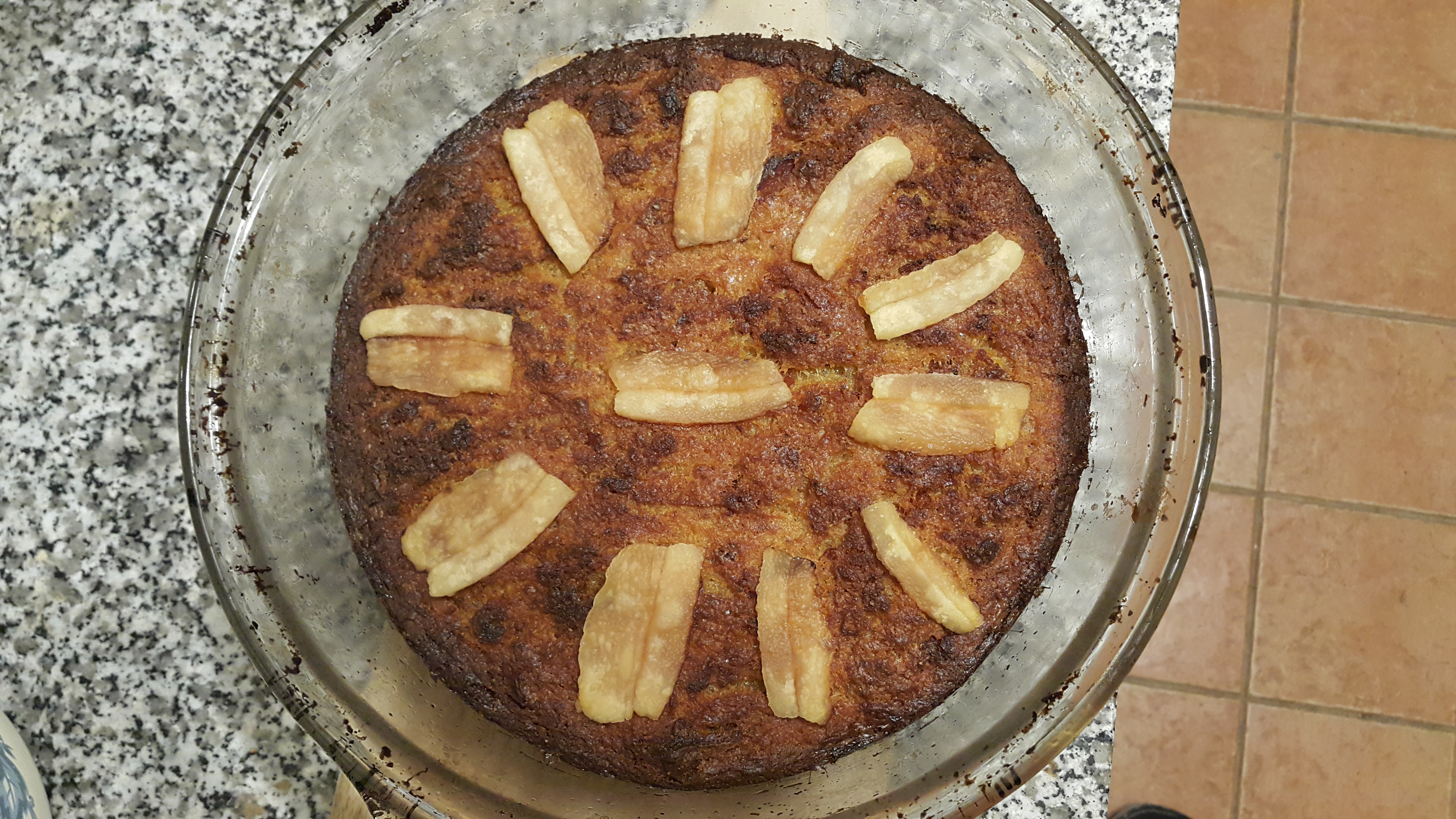
- Babka ziemniaczana made according to traditional recipe from Podlachia, Poland
- Type: Pie or pudding
- Place of origin: Belarus
- Main ingredients: Potatoes, eggs, onions, bacon

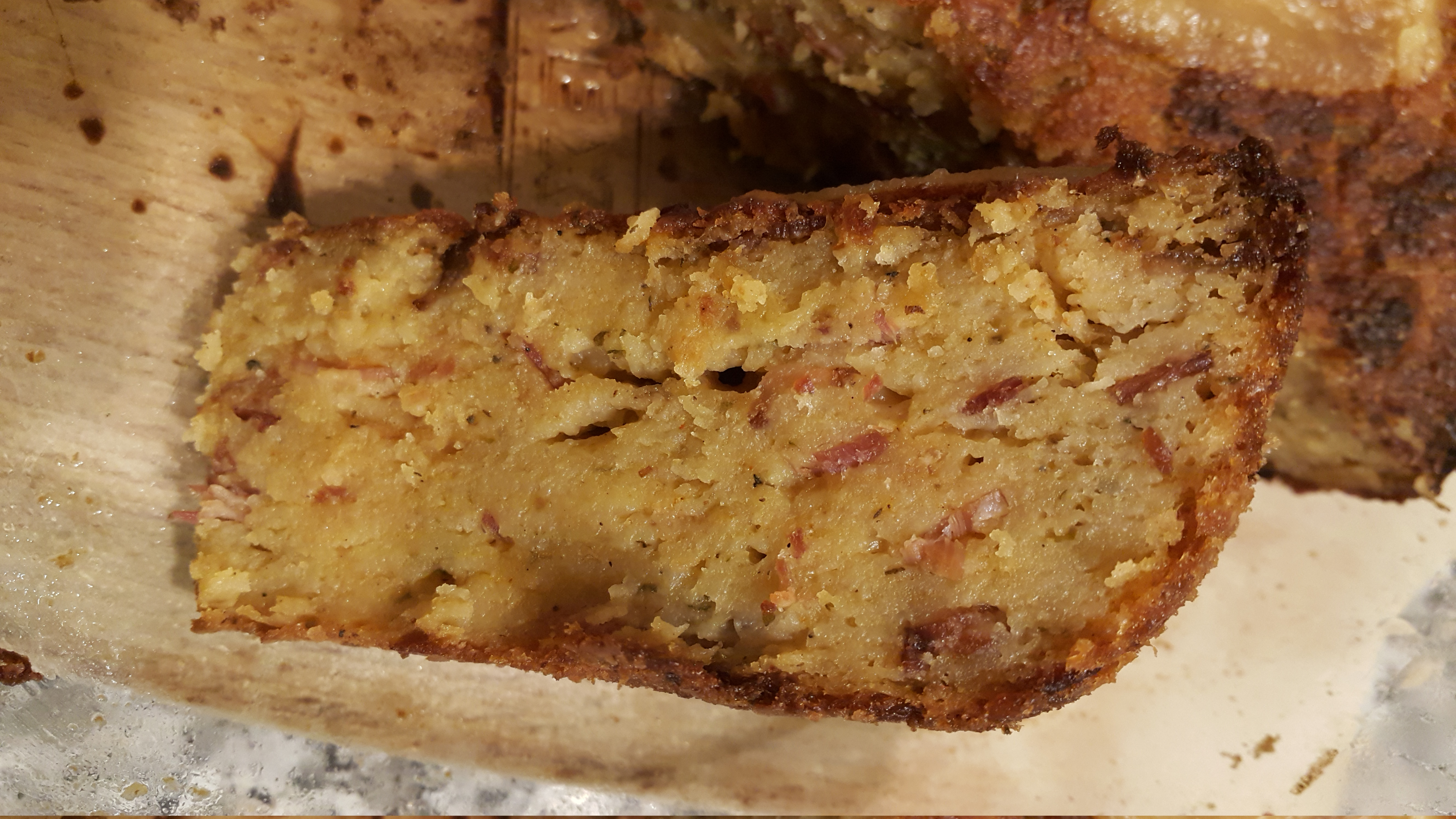
Babka ziemniaczana made according to traditional recipe from the Polish region of Podlachia, cross section

Potato babka is a savoury baked potato dish, popular especially in Belarus (Note: In Belarusian, бульбяная бабка) and northeastern Poland, where it is known as babka ziemniaczana. (Note: Other names include kartoflak, bugaj, rejbak and kugiel.) It is considered the most famous dish of the Polish region of Podlachia.

It is made from grated potatoes, eggs, onions, and pieces of smoked, boiled or fried bacon and (especially in Poland) sausage. It is oven-baked in a crock, and often served with a sauce of sour cream and pork flitch. Depending on recipe and cooking method, it may be either a flaky potato pie or a heavy potato pudding.

In 2016, the purported world's largest potato babka, 2 metres (6 1/2 ft) in diameter, was baked in the village of Sula, Belarus.

== Similar dishes ==
The dish is similar to the Lithuanian kugelis and the Ashkenazi Jewish potato kugel, also known as kartoffelkugel in Yiddish.

== See also ==
- Babka
- Bourekas
- Draniki
- List of casserole dishes
- List of egg dishes
- List of potato dishes
