= Kasha varnishkes =

Ashkenazi buckwheat and noodle dish

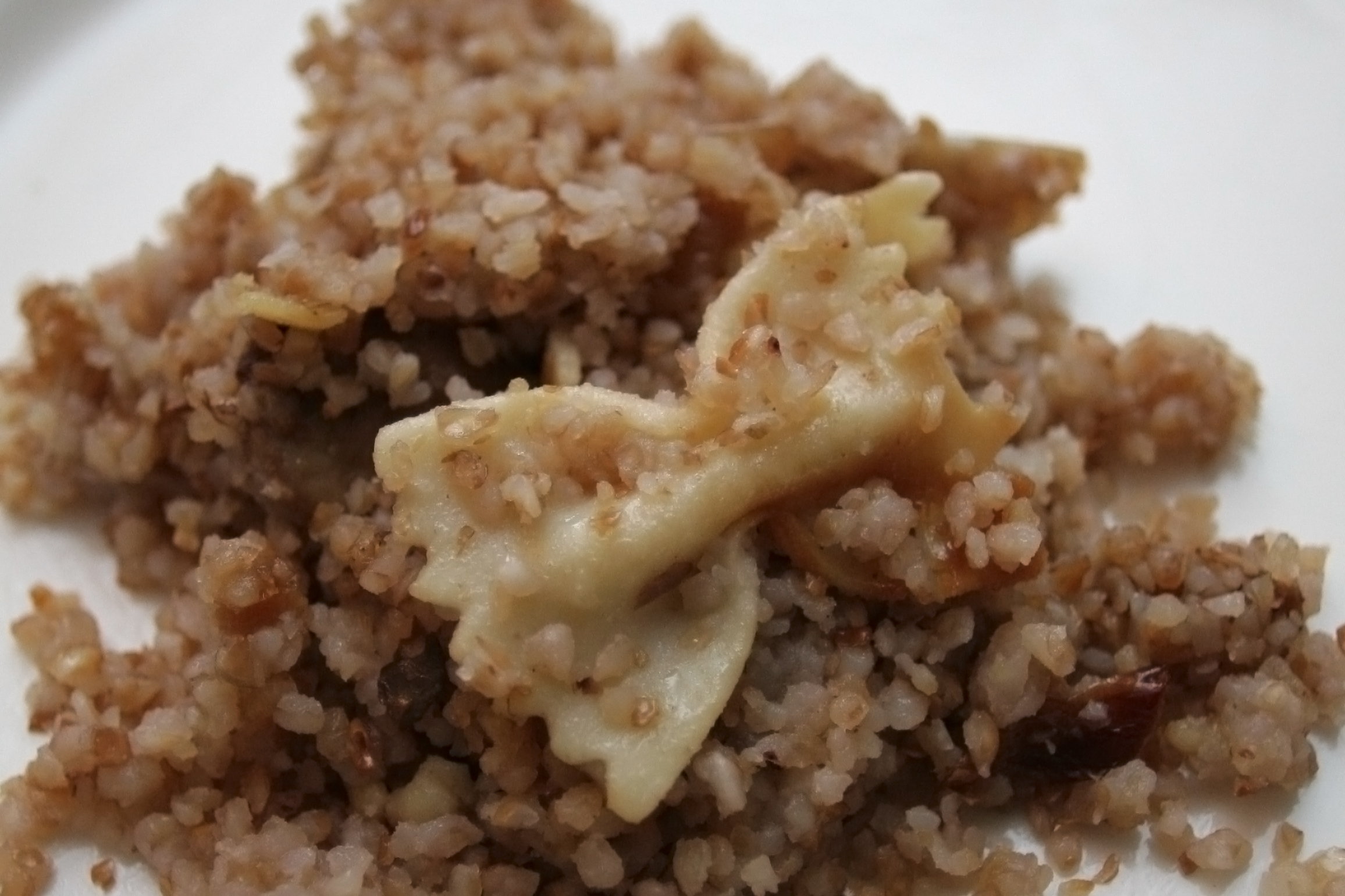
Kasha varnishkas

Kashe varnishkes (sometimes Americanized as kasha varnishkas) is a traditional dish of the Jewish Ashkenazi community. It combines kasha (buckwheat groats) with noodles, typically bow-tie shape lokshen egg noodles.

Buckwheat groats (gretshkes/greytshkelach or retshkes/reytshkelach in Yiddish) are prepared separately from, and then fried together with, lokshen and tsibelach (onions) in schmaltz (poultry fat). Sometimes briye (chicken or beef stock) is used in the preparation.

== Origins ==
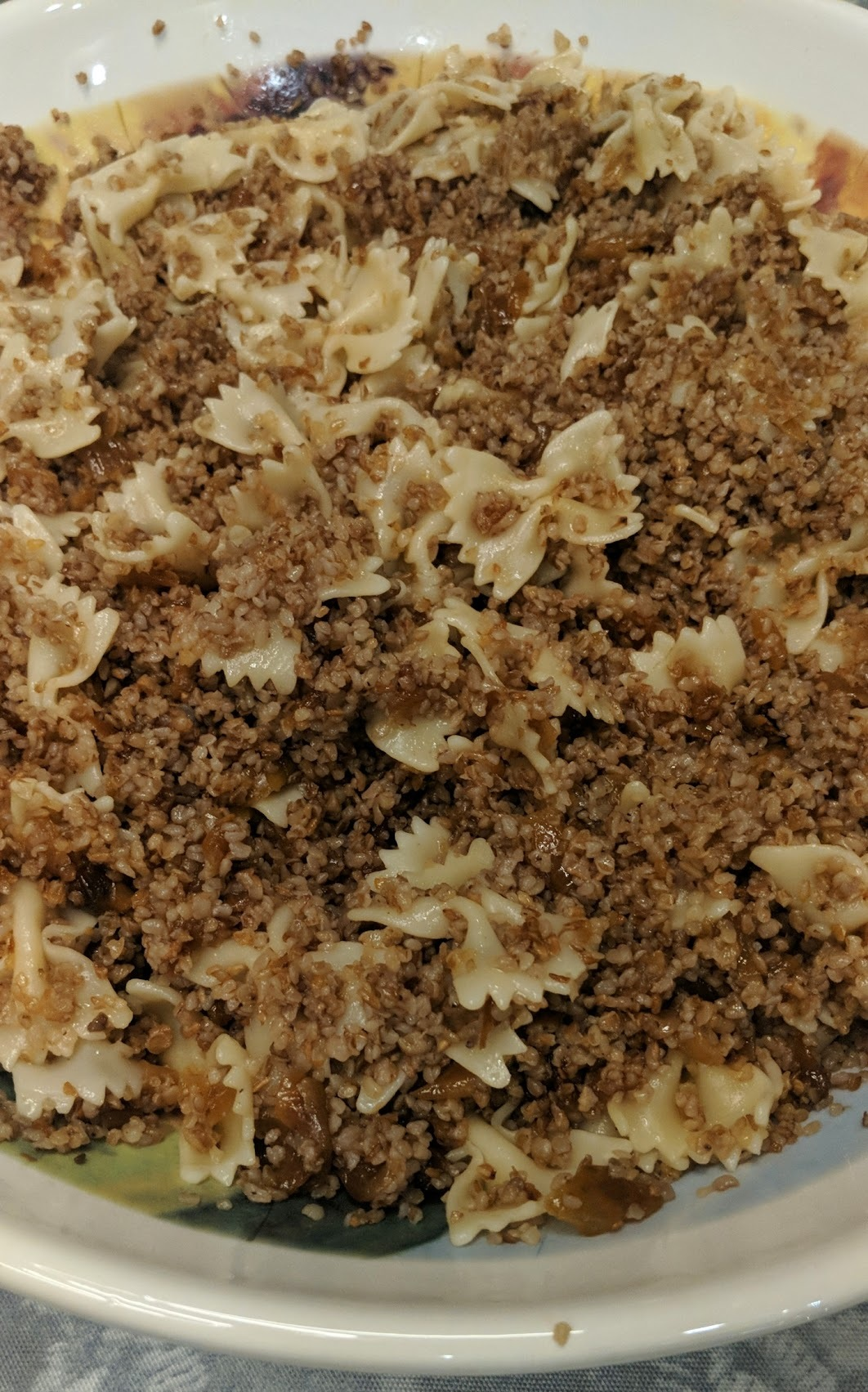

Kasha varnishkes are part of the cuisine introduced as Ashkenazi Jewish communities of Eastern Europe fled Europe due to rising antisemitism and pogroms and sought refuge in the United States and other countries. They brought with them food of their tradition including kasha varnishkes to America, and it became widely popular in the American Jewish cuisine and community. The name and the dish varnishkes as a whole seems to be a Yiddish adaptation of the Ukrainian vareniki (varenyky, stuffed dumplings). Buckwheat came to Ukraine and became one of the most common fillings of Ukrainian dumplings. This dish was enhanced by emigrating Jews in the Ashkenazic manner.

One of the first records of the dish is in an 1898 Yiddish play Die Mumeh Sosye (Aunt Sosya) by Abraham Goldfaden. A recipe published in a Yiddish American cookbook in 1925 shows kashe-filled noodles or dumplings, rather than the simpler kashe with farfalle. Food writer Gil Marks proposes that the dish was developed in New York City in the late nineteenth century through cultural exchange with Italian pasta makers. An increase in access to and ease of using dried pasta by the mid-twentieth century also likely contributed to a shift to the now standard farfalle.

== See also ==
- List of buckwheat dishes
- List of Jewish cuisine dishes
