= Kugelis =

Lithuanian potato dish

Bulvių plokštainis
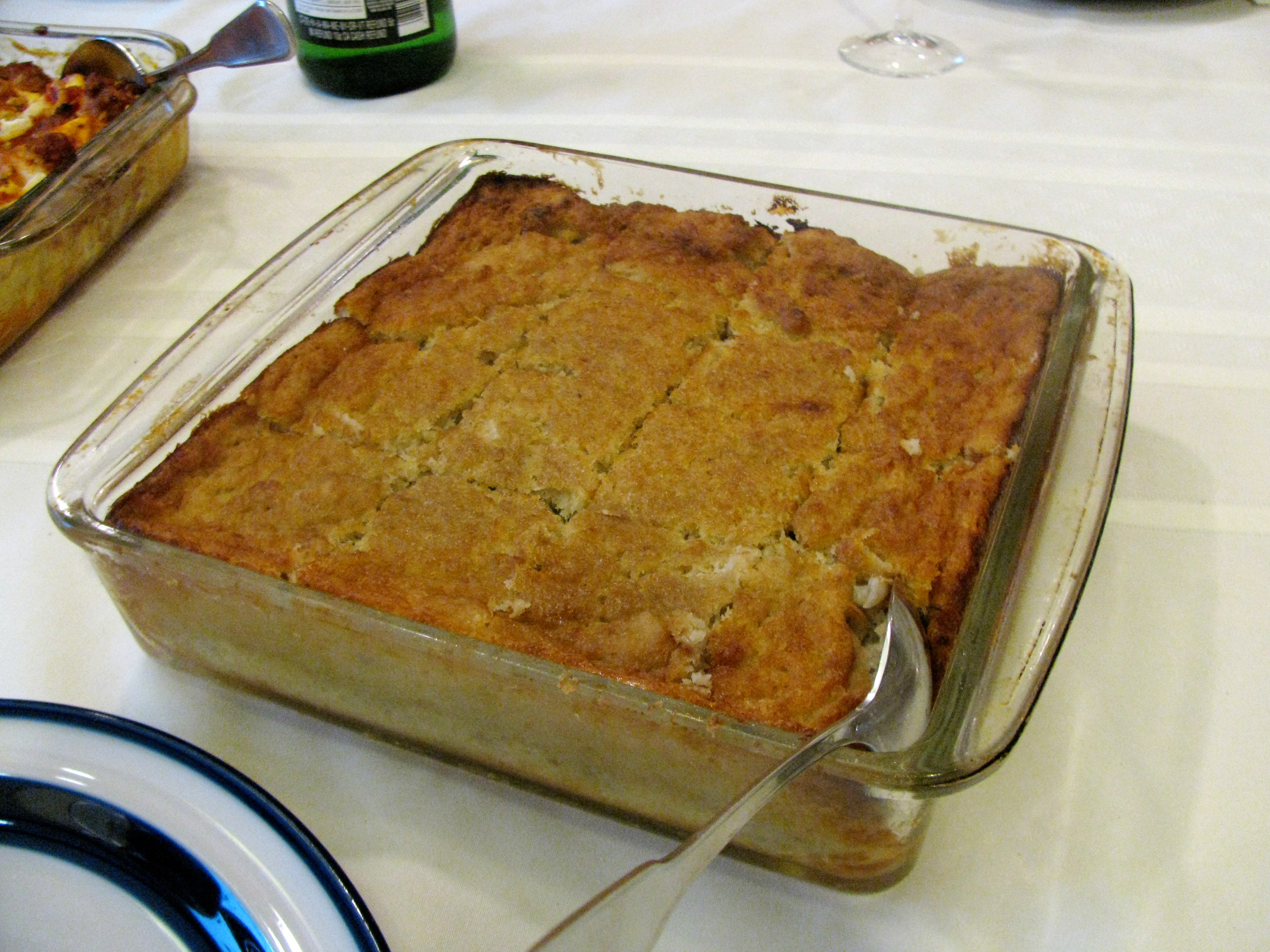
- Type: Pudding
- Place of origin: Lithuania
- Main ingredients: Potatoes, bacon, milk, onions, and eggs

Kugelis, also known as bulvių plokštainis ("potato pie"), is a potato dish from Lithuania. Potatoes, bacon, milk, onions, and eggs are seasoned with salt and pepper and flavoured, for example with bay leaves and/or marjoram, then oven-baked. It is usually eaten with sour cream or pork rind with diced onions.

Similar dishes include the Jewish kugel and the Belarusian and Polish potato babka.

== See also ==
- Lithuanian cuisine
- Kugel
- Potato babka
- History of the potato
