= Israeli couscous =

Toasted pasta in tiny balls

Ptitim
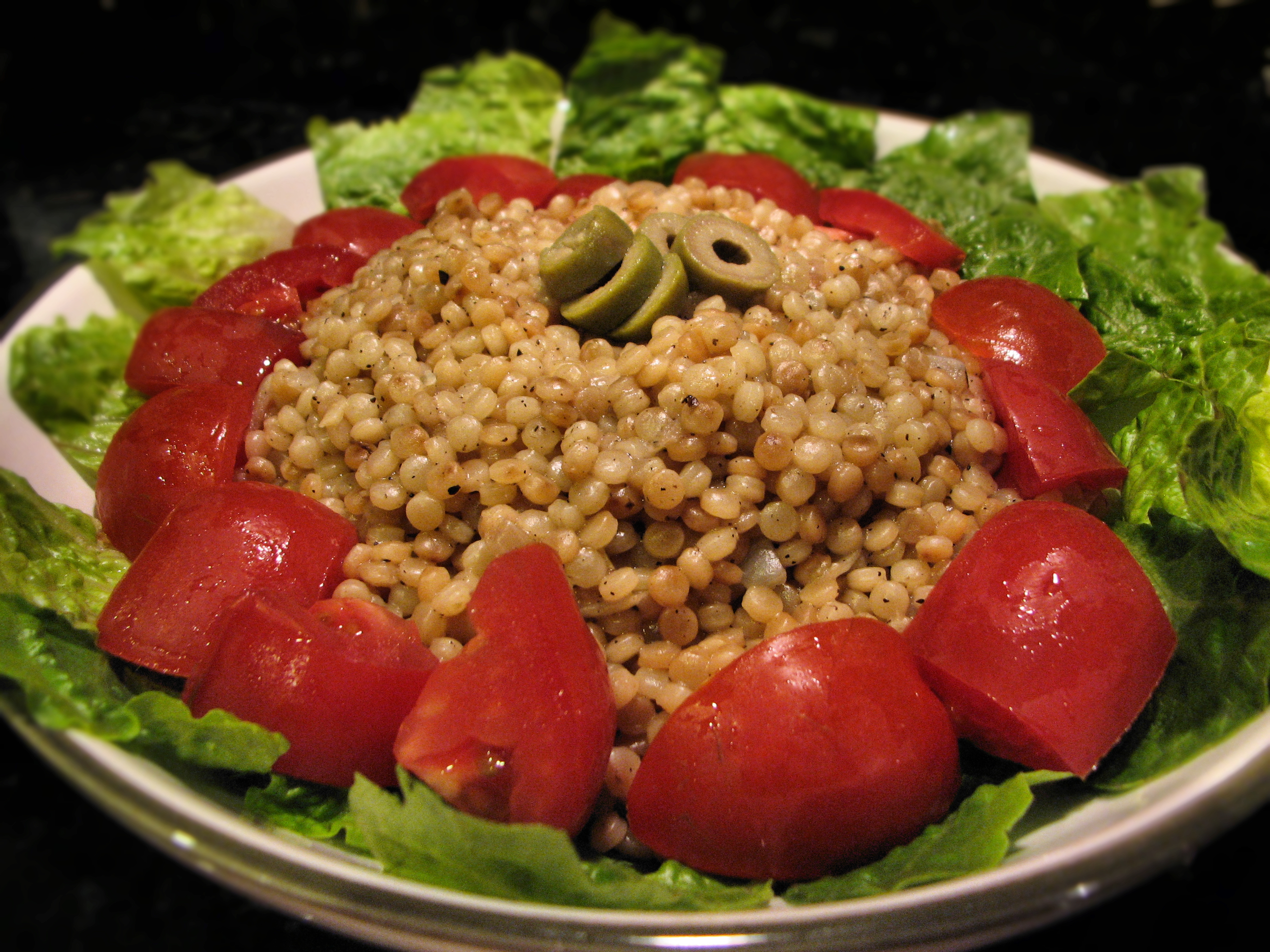
- Alternative names: Ben-Gurion rice Israeli couscous
- Type: Pasta
- Course: Side dish
- Place of origin: Israel
- Created by: Osem
- Main ingredients: Wheat
- Food energy (per 55 g (1/3 cup) serving): 200 kcal (840 kJ)
Nutritional value
(per 55 g (1/3 cup) serving)
- Protein: 6 g
- Fat: 0 g
- Carbohydrate: 43 g

Ptitim (Hebrew: פְּתִיתִים, romanized: pṯīṯīm, lit. 'flakes', singular: פְּתִית, pṯīṯ, 'flake') is a type of toasted grain-shaped pasta. Other names for it include Ben-Gurion rice (used especially for the original rice-shaped varieties) and Israeli couscous, hinting at its origins in the rice shortages experienced in 1950s Israel.

== History ==
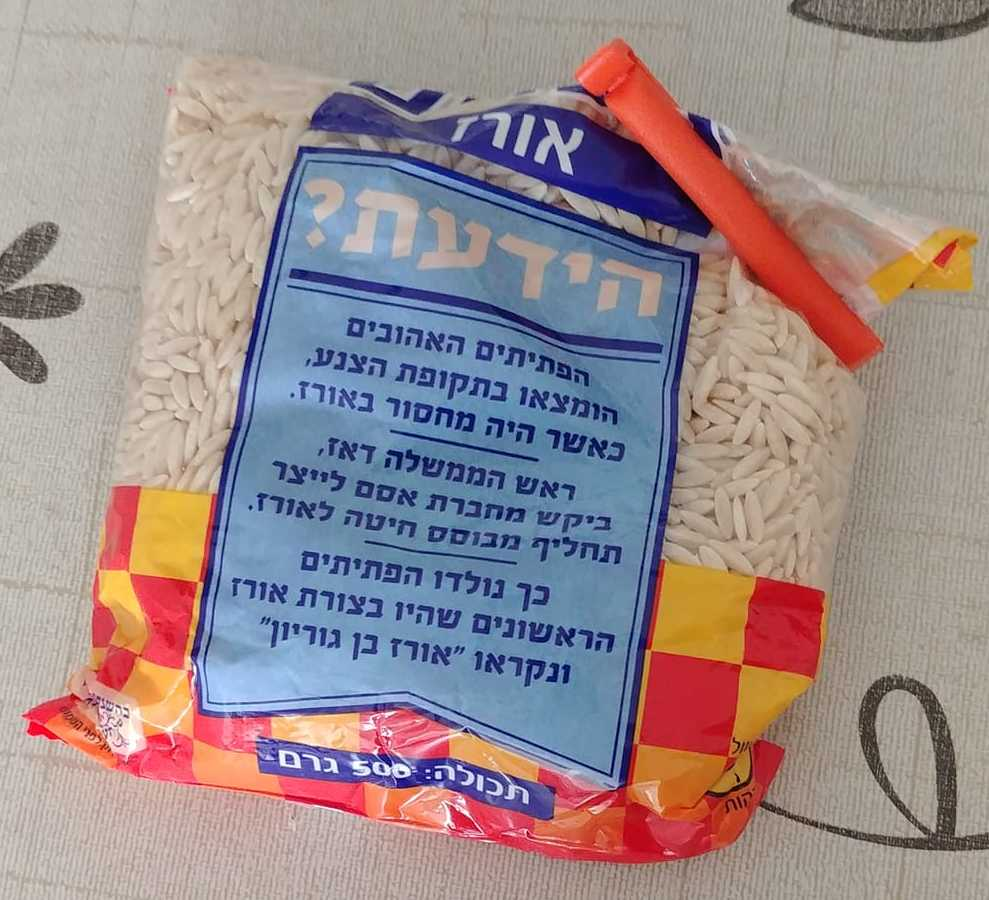
Original rice-shaped "Ben-Gurion rice". The front label introduces the history of the product (see above).

Ptitim was created in 1953, during the austerity period in Israel.

Israel's first prime minister, David Ben-Gurion, asked Eugen Proper, one of the founders of the Osem food company, to devise a wheat-based substitute for rice. The company took up the challenge and developed ptitim, which is made of hard wheat flour and toasted in an oven. Ptitim was initially produced with a rice-shape, but after its success Osem also began to produce a ball-shaped variety inspired by couscous.

Consequently, ptitim is sometimes called "Ben-Gurion rice".

== Preparation ==
Ptitim is made by extruding dough through a round mold, before it is cut and toasted, giving it the uniform natural-grain-like shape and its unique nutty flavor. Unlike common types of pasta and couscous, ptitim was factory-made from the outset, and therefore is rarely seen home-made from scratch. The store-bought product is easy and quick to prepare.

In Israel, ptitim is popular among children, who eat it plain, or mixed with fried onion and tomato paste. Ptitim is now produced in ring, star, and heart shapes for added appeal. Varieties made with whole wheat and spelt flour are also available for health-conscious consumers. Ptitim has also been popularised in other countries, and in the United States, it can be found on the menus of contemporary American chefs and in gourmet markets.

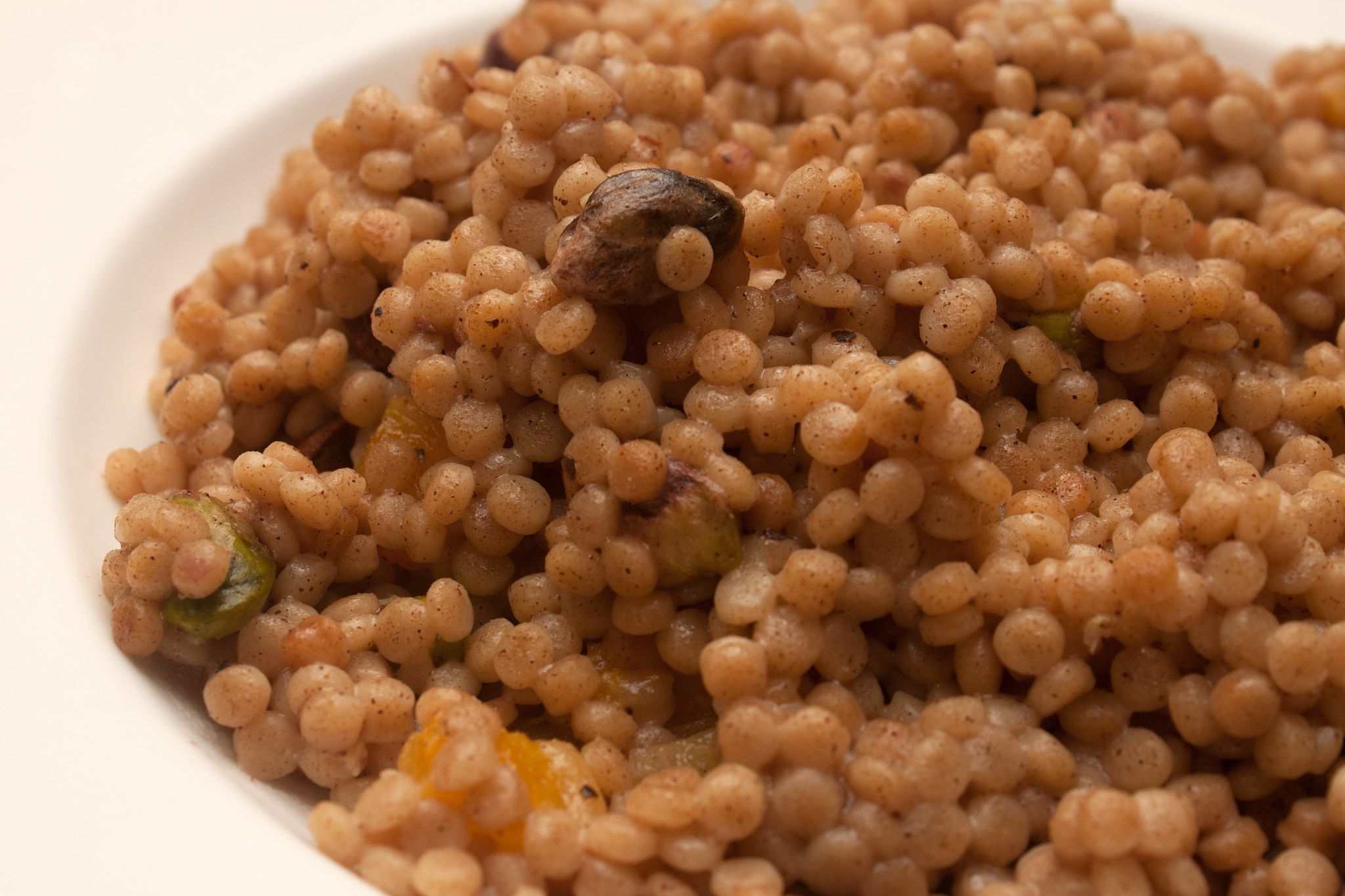
Couscous-style ptitim prepared as a dish of the Israeli cuisine

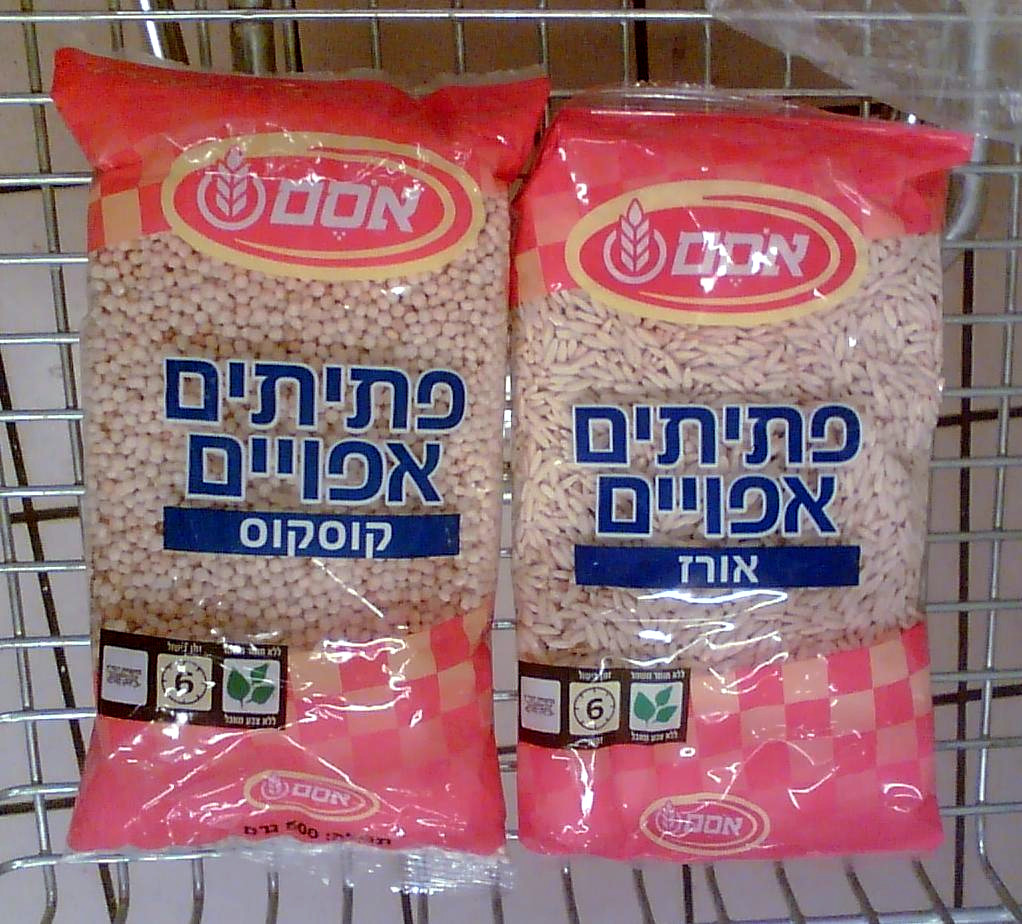
Ptitim in two types: "couscous" (left) and "rice" (right)

Ptitim can be used in many different types of dishes, both hot and cold. The grains retain their shape and texture even when reheated, and they do not clump together. Commonly, ptitim is prepared with sautéed onions or garlic (vegetables, meat, chicken or sausage can also be added). The ptitim grains may be fried for a short time before adding water. They can also be baked, go in soup, served in a pie, used for stuffing, or made as a risotto. Ptitim may also be used in other dishes as a substitute for pasta or rice. American chef Charlie Trotter has produced a number of recipes for ptitim-based gourmet dishes, even as a dessert.

== Similar products ==
=== European foods ===
Ptitim is very similar to the German farfel, which was brought by German Jews from Europe beginning in the 1800s, and the two are often substituted for each other.

The Sardinian fregula is a hand-rolled, toasted semolina product dating back to the 14th century. Ptitim has a similar nutty flavour to fregula, but is extruded rather than rolled.

Ptitim also resembles some products of the pastina family, in particular acini di pepe, orzo ("risoni") and stellini. However, unlike pastina, the ptitim grains are pre-baked/toasted.

=== Southwest Asian and North African foods ===
Moghrabieh in Jordan, Lebanon and Syria is made from durum wheat semolina, maftoul in Palestinian cuisine is made from bulgur and wheat, and Amazigh berkoukes (aka abazine, aïch) is semolina-based.

Berkoukes is documented in North African literature as early as the 12th century, and maftoul and moghrabieh likely date back to the early modern period, when couscous was brought to the Levant from North Africa.

While ptitim is produced by extrusion through a die like many pastas, moghrabieh, maftoul and berkoukes are produced by rolling dough between the palms or fingers, or between the hands and a flat surface. Ptitim is toasted before it is packaged and sold, while moghrabieh, maftoul and berkoukes are sold untoasted, but often toasted during their preparation by the consumer.

== See also ==
- Levantine cuisine
- Tarhonya
- Orzo
