= Orzo =

Type of pasta

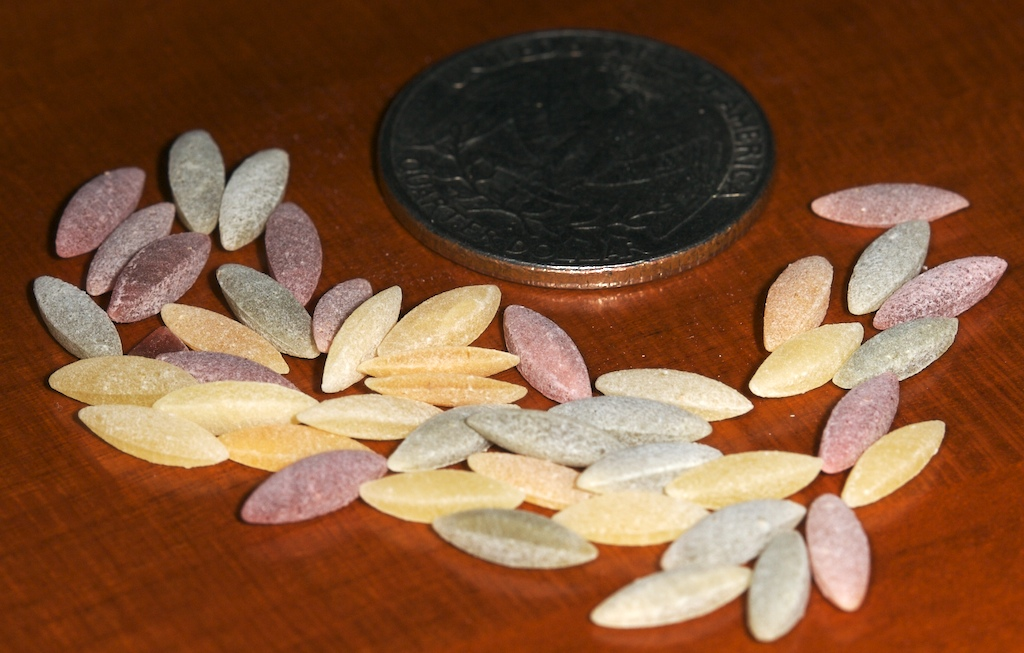
- Uncooked orzo
- Alternative names: Risoni
- Type: Pasta
- Place of origin: Mediterranean basin
- Main ingredients: Durum wheat

Orzo (/ˈɔːrzoʊ, ˈɔːrtsoʊ/, Italian: [ˈɔrdzo]; lit. 'barley'; from Latin hordeum), also known in Italy as risoni (Italian: [riˈzoːni]; 'large [grains of] rice'), is a form of short-cut pasta shaped like a large grain of rice. Orzo is made from flour, often with semolina.

The name orzo is common for this pasta shape in North America, but less so in Italy, where the word usually means 'barley'.

== Preparation ==
There are many different ways to serve orzo. It can be an ingredient in soup, including avgolemono, a Greek soup, and in Italian soups, such as minestrone. It can also be part of a salad, a pilaf or giouvetsi, or baked in a casserole.

It can also be boiled and lightly fried, to create a dish similar to risotto.

== Other names ==
Orzo is essentially identical to the κριθαράκι (kritharáki, lit. 'little barley') or μανέστρα (manestra when in soup) in Greek cuisine, arpa şehriye (lit. 'barley noodle') in Turkish cooking, and لسان العصفور (lisān al-ʿaṣfūr, lit. 'bird tongue') in Egyptian cooking. In Spain, the equivalent pasta is called piñones (also the Spanish word for 'pine nuts', which orzo resembles) or gurullos. Ptitim is a rice-grain-shaped pasta developed in the 1950s in Israel as a substitute for rice.

It is also part of the traditional cuisine of eastern France, from Lorraine to Provence, where orzo is called pépinettes or riewele depending on the region. In Alsace, orzo is typically served in a chicken broth.

== See also ==
- List of pasta
