= Brisket (Jewish dish) =

Ashkenazi Jewish dish

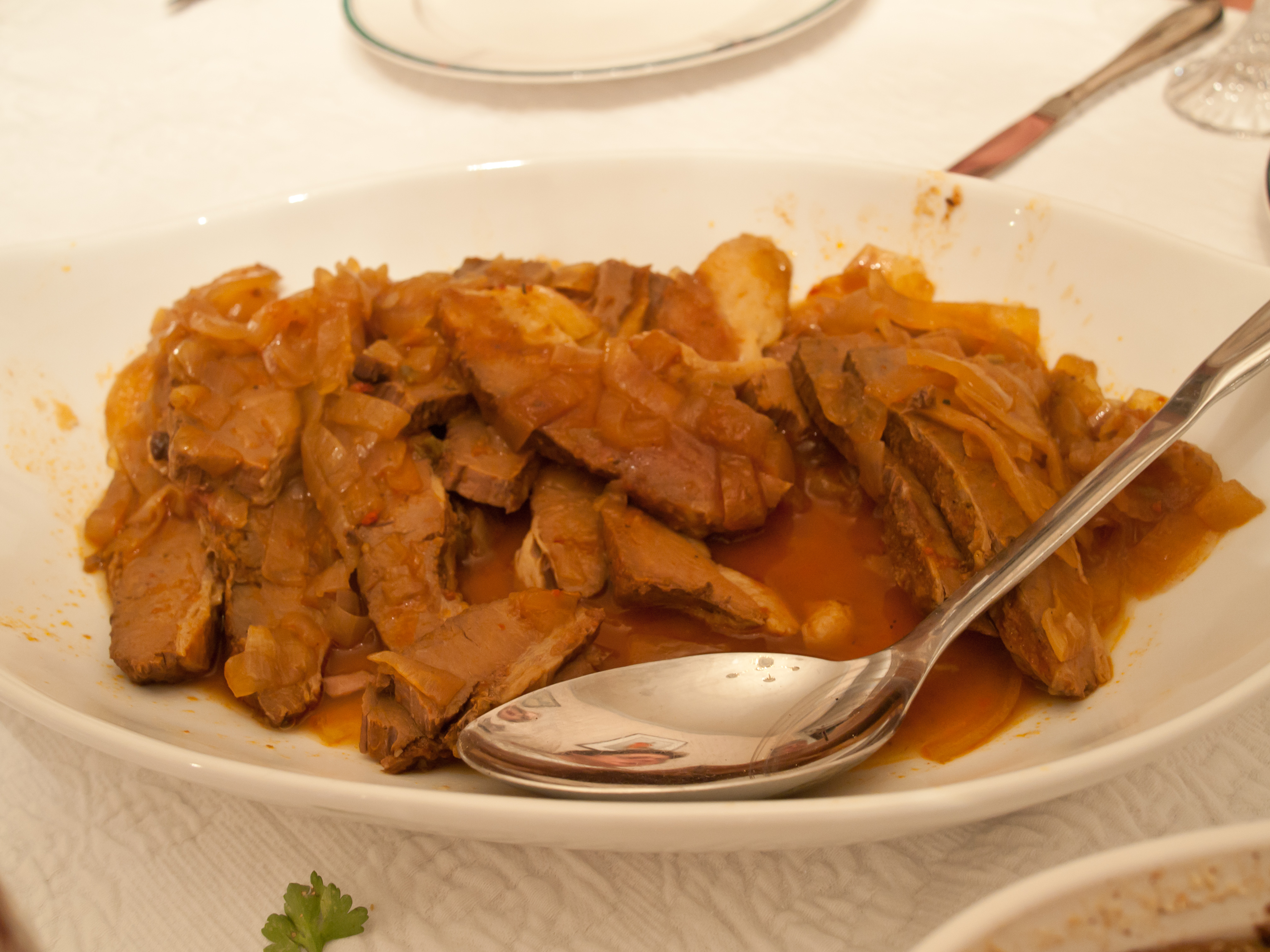
- Alternative names: Jewish brisket; beef brisket; Shabbat brisket
- Type: Jewish cuisine
- Place of origin: Europe
- Created by: Ashkenazi Jews

Brisket is a popular Ashkenazi Jewish dish of braised beef brisket, served hot and traditionally accompanied by potato or other non-dairy kugel, latkes, and often preceded by matzo ball soup. It is commonly served for Jewish holidays such as Hanukkah, Passover, Rosh Hashanah, and Shabbat. It is commonly found in Jewish communities worldwide, though it is most commonly associated with Jews in the United States, where it has been considered the most important and iconic Jewish main course since the early 20th century.

== Overview ==
In traditional Jewish cooking, brisket is most often slow cooked in an oven for many hours at a low temperature, which helps tenderize the otherwise-tough (but exceptionally flavorful) meat.

Brisket is especially popular as a holiday main course, usually served at Rosh Hashanah, Passover, Hanukkah, and on Shabbat. For reasons of economics and kashrut, it was historically one of the more popular cuts of beef among Ashkenazi Jews.

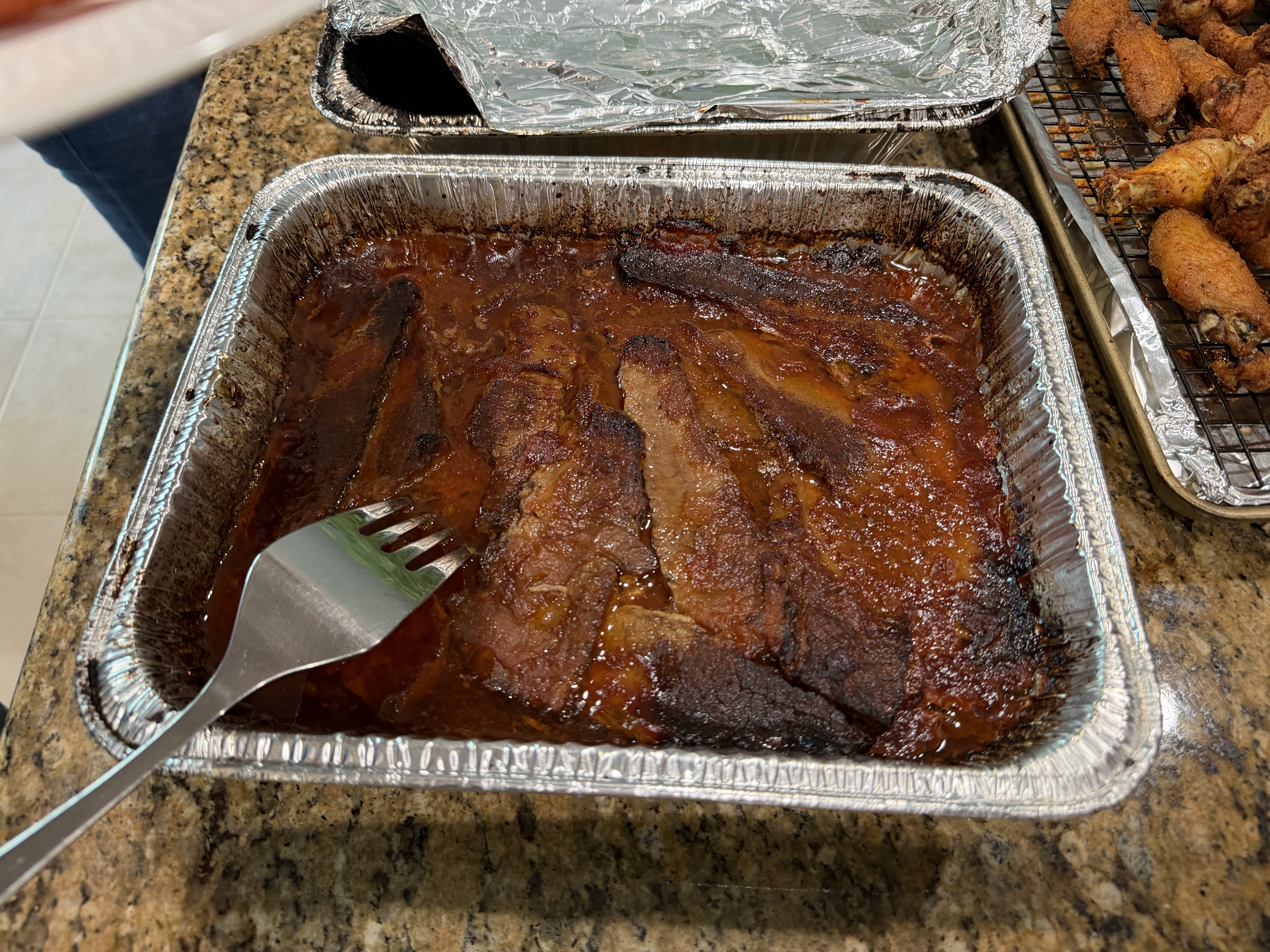
Tray of slow-cooked, sliced brisket made for Passover

== History ==
Brisket is implicitly kosher since it is from the front of the animal, and it was cheap because anything that takes a long time to cook and that cannot be grilled has challenges, especially in a restaurant

— Julia Moskin, reporter for The New York Times

Brisket has been eaten by Ashkenazi Jews in Europe for special occasions such as Passover.

Brisket is tough, but cheap, and if cooked for many hours at a low temperature it becomes tender. Brisket became popular among Ashkenazi Jews due to its low cost; farmers would sell the expensive cuts and keep the cheaper ones.

Ashkenazi Jewish refugees brought shtetl cooking with them, and introduced brisket to the general American population.

Brisket then went on to become one of the most important foods in Jewish cuisine and culture, especially in America.

== Preparation ==
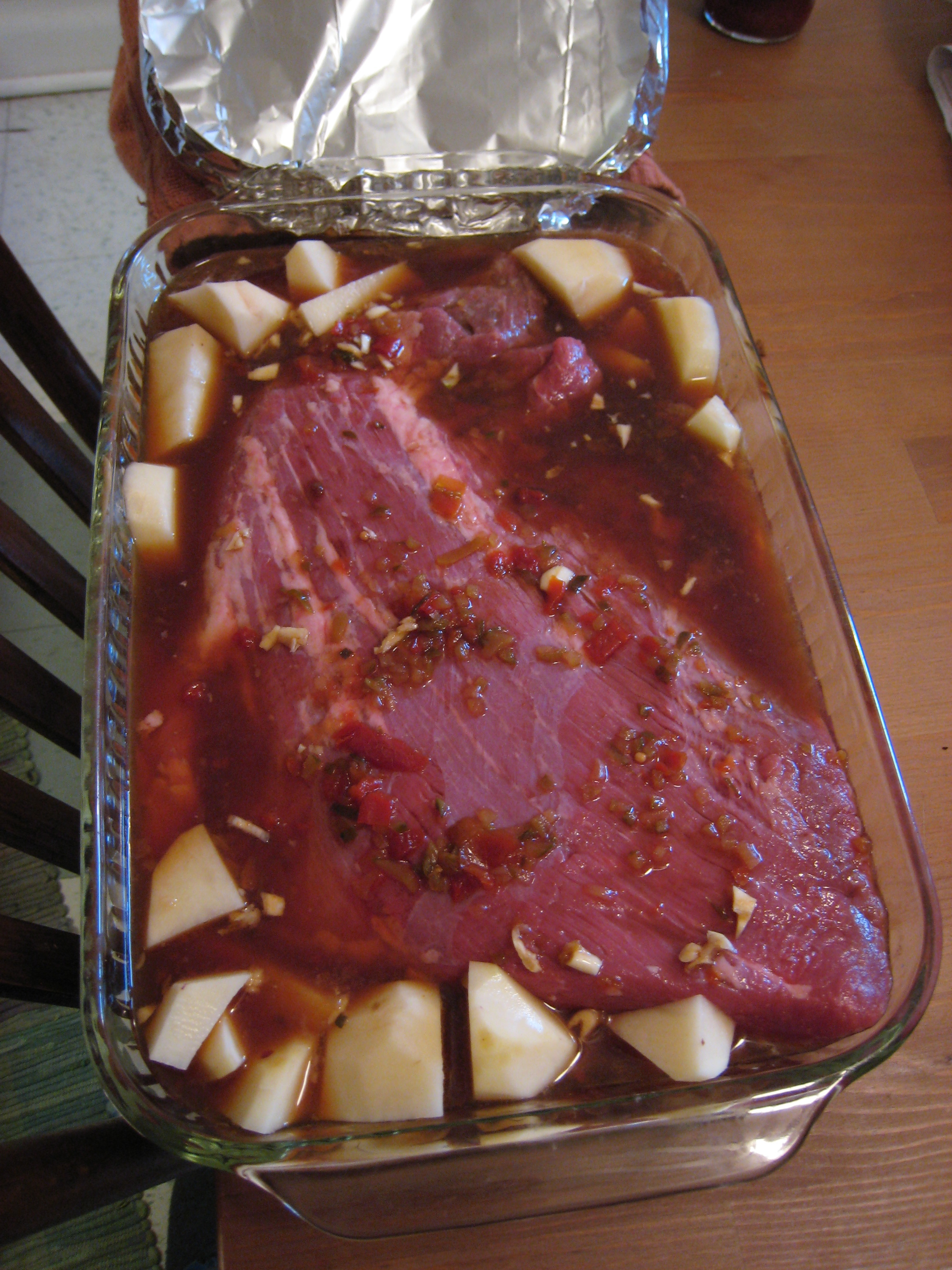
Brisket being prepared for Passover

Brisket is prepared in a wide variety of ways by Ashkenazi Jews.

Brisket is cooked for several hours at a low temperature and is cooked with a flavorful sauce and root vegetables.

It is commonly seasoned or cooked with a sauce, such as chili sauce or ketchup, or even Coca-Cola, and vegetables such as onions, garlic, potatoes and carrots are added and the brisket is then cooked for several hours in an oven. In modern times a slow cooker has also become a popular cooking method for brisket. One of the most common ways brisket is prepared in American Jewish cuisine is called a sweet-and-sour brisket and consists of a brisket cooked in a sauce containing crushed tomatoes, seasonings, brown sugar, vinegar, and beef or chicken stock. Another preparation of brisket is marinated and cooked with a sauce containing brewed coffee.

== Uses ==
Brisket is commonly eaten on its own, or alongside pareve kugel (potato or noodle), or matzah ball soup. The leftovers of brisket are traditionally used in a variety of ways, such as in cholent, chamin, and other soups or stews, as well as in sandwiches.

== See also ==
- Texas smoked brisket, which originated from Jewish immigrants in Texas
- Corned beef
- Montreal-style smoked meat
- Pastrami
- Sauerbraten
