= Kugel =

Traditional Ashkenazi Jewish casserole

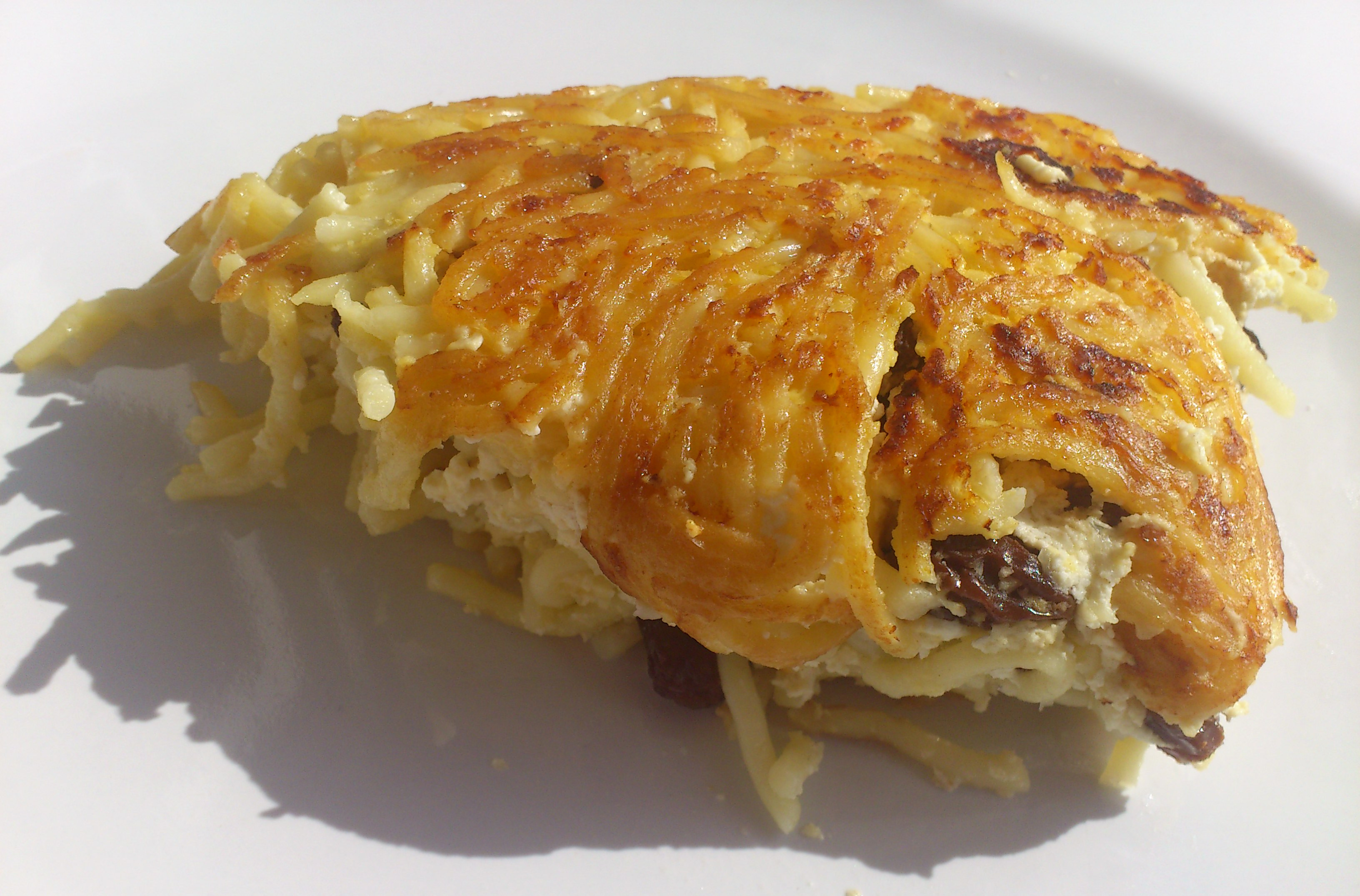
- Type: casserole
- Place of origin: Jewish communities from Central Europe, United States, France, Canada, United Kingdom, Australia, Argentina, South Africa, and other communities in the Jewish diaspora.
- Created by: Ashkenazi Jews
- Main ingredients: Lokshen noodles or potatoes, less commonly matzo, challah, rice, apple, cornmeal, dough

Kugel (Yiddish: קוגל kugl, pronounced [ˈkʊɡl̩] or [ˈkɪɡl̩]) is a baked casserole, most commonly made from egg noodles (lokshen) or shredded potato. It is a traditional Ashkenazi Jewish dish, often served on Sabbath and Jewish holidays. American Jews also serve it for Thanksgiving dinner. In Hungary it is known as "vargabéles" and served as a sweet dish.

== Etymology ==
The name of the dish comes from the Middle High German kugel meaning 'sphere, globe, ball'; thus the Yiddish name likely originated as a reference to the round, puffed-up shape of the original dishes (compare to German Gugelhupf—a type of ring-shaped cake). However, nowadays kugel is often baked in square pans.

In Yiddish (and sometimes in English), noodle and potato kugel are called לאָקשן קוגל lokshn kugl and קאַרטאָפל קוגל kartofl kugl, respectively. The name of the dish may also be spelled kigel, reflecting the Galitzianer (Southeastern European) Yiddish pronunciation.

== History ==
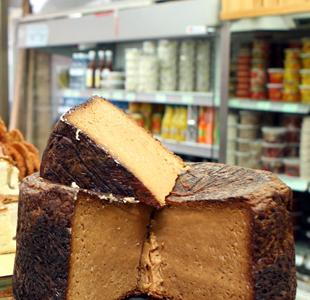
Yerushalmi or Jerusalem kugel

The first kugels were made from bread and flour and were savory rather than sweet. About 800 years ago, Jewish cooks in Germany replaced bread mixtures with lokshen noodles or farfel. Eventually eggs were incorporated. The addition of cottage cheese and milk created a custard-like consistency common in today's dessert dishes. In Poland, Jewish homemakers added raisins, cinnamon and sweet curd cheese to noodle kugel recipes. In the late 19th century, Israelites combined caramelized sugar and black pepper in a noodle kugel known as the Jerusalem kugel (Hebrew: קוגל ירושלמי, romanized: kugel yerushalmi), which is a commonly served at Shabbat kiddushes and is a popular side dish served with cholent during Shabbat lunch.

In Romania, this dish is called Budinca de macaroane ("macaroni pudding") or Baba acolo. It is made with or without cheese, but almost always includes raisins. In Transylvania, especially in the Hungarian-speaking regions, a very similar dish is called Vargabéles.

Savory kugel may be based on potatoes, matzah, cabbage, carrots, zucchini, spinach, or cheese.

Romani people call it pirogo. The Romani version is made with raisins, cream cheese, and butter.

== Varieties ==
=== Jerusalem kugel ===
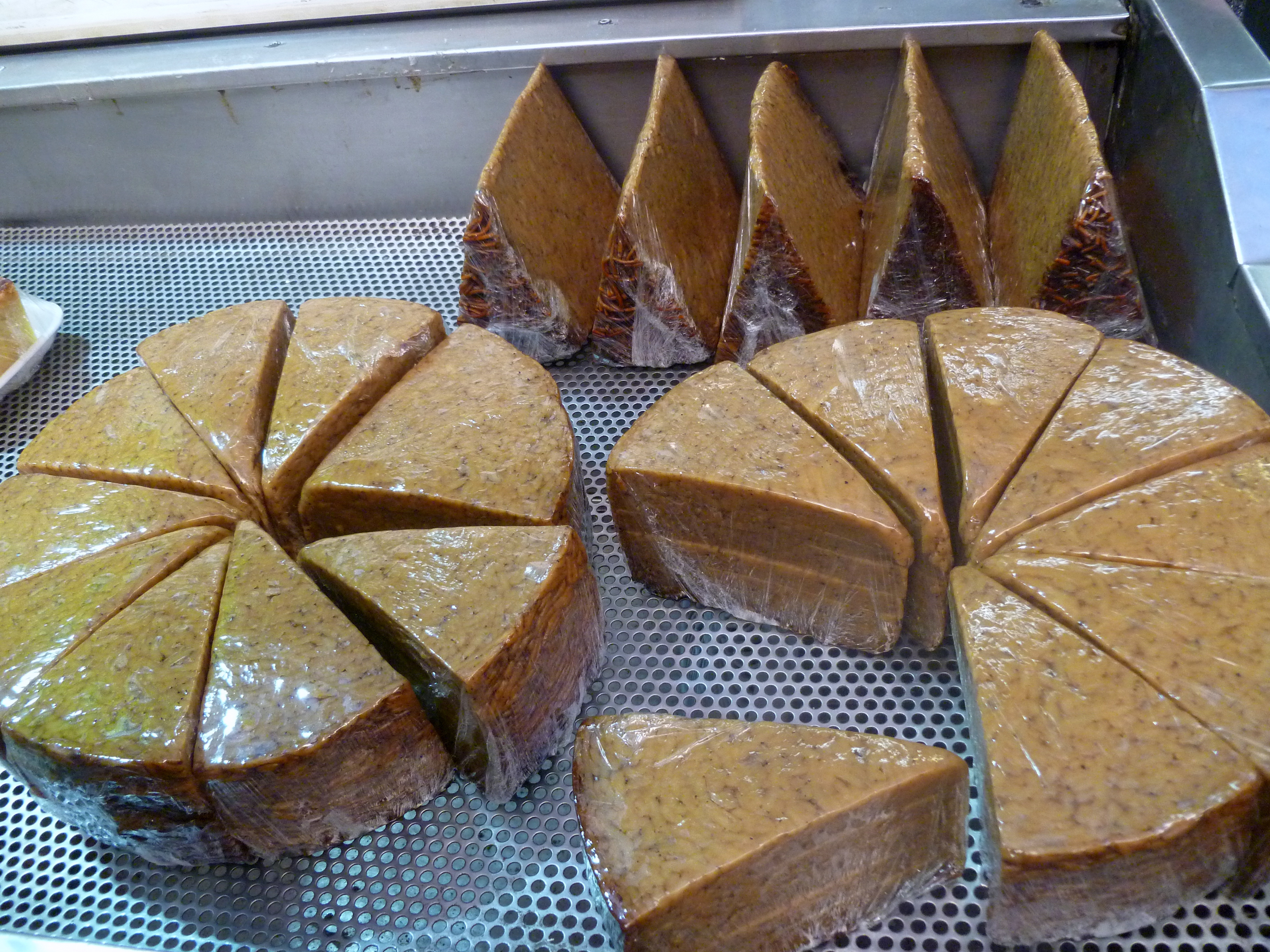
Yerushalmi Kugel packaged for sale at a market in Israel

Yerushalmi Kugel, (ירושלמי קוגל 'Jerusalem kugel'), also known as Galilean kugel, is an Israeli Jewish kugel dish originating from the local Jewish community of Jerusalem in the 1700s.

=== Noodle kugel ===
Noodle kugel (lokshen kugel) is an Ashkenazi Jewish casserole, side dish and popular variety of kugel made with lokshen noodles and either a variety of dairy or pareve ingredients.

=== Potato kugel ===
Potato kugel is a potato-based kugel of Ashkenazi Jewish origin, made with grated or pureed potatoes, onions, eggs, flour or matzo meal, oil, salt and pepper.

=== Vargabéles ===
A Hungarian sweet dish made with angel hair pasta, curd, eggs, raisin, and phyllo pastry.

== Jewish festivals ==
Kugels are a mainstay of festive meals in Ashkenazi Jewish homes, particularly on the Jewish Sabbath and other Jewish holidays or at a tish. Some Hasidic Jews believe that eating kugel on the Jewish Sabbath brings special spiritual blessings, particularly if that kugel was served on the table of a Hasidic Rebbe.

== South African slang usage ==
Among South African Jews, the word kugel was used by the elder generation as a term for a young Jewish woman who forsook traditional Jewish dress values for those of the ostentatiously wealthy and became overly materialistic and overgroomed, mirroring how the kugel is a plain pudding garnished as a delicacy. The women thus described made light of the term, and it has since become an amusing rather than derogatory slang in South African English for a materialistic young woman.

== Similar dishes ==
- Hotdish
- Potatonik
- Zucchini slice
- Kugelis

== See also ==
- Cuisine of Israel
- List of casserole dishes
