= Tarhonya =

Dried egg- and wheat- based ingredient in Hungary and Slovakia

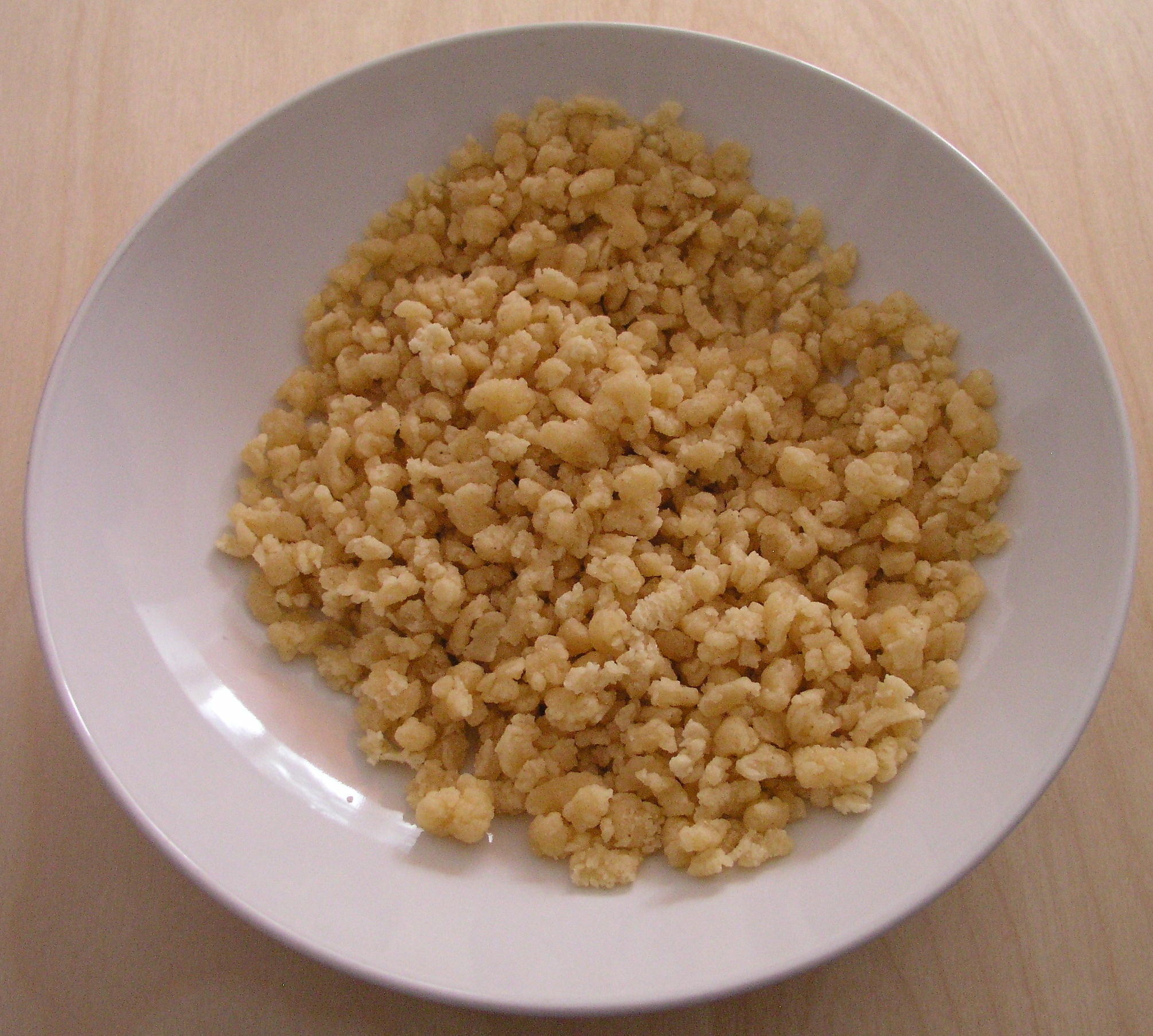
Homemade tarhonya

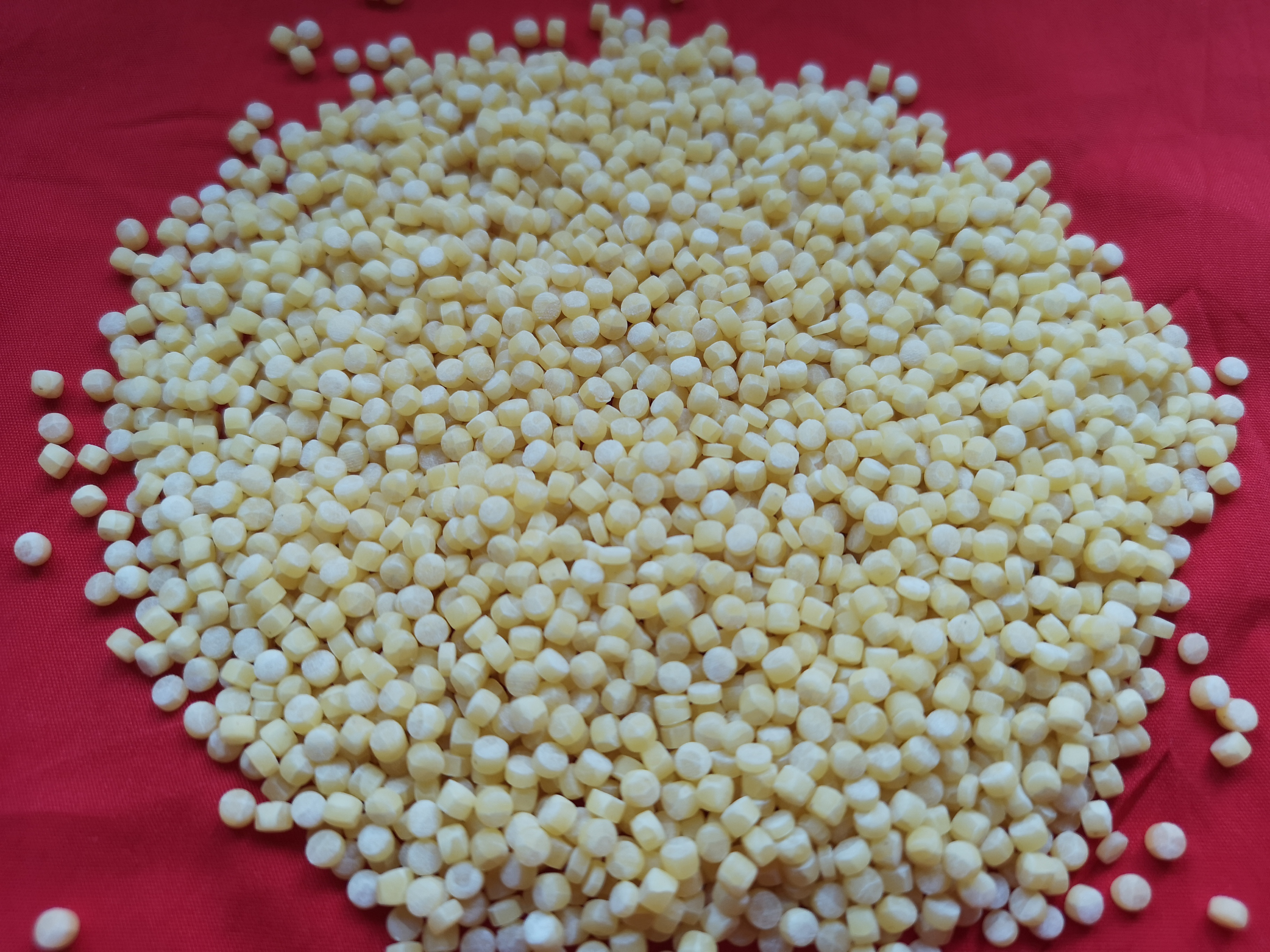
Dried shop-bought tarhonya

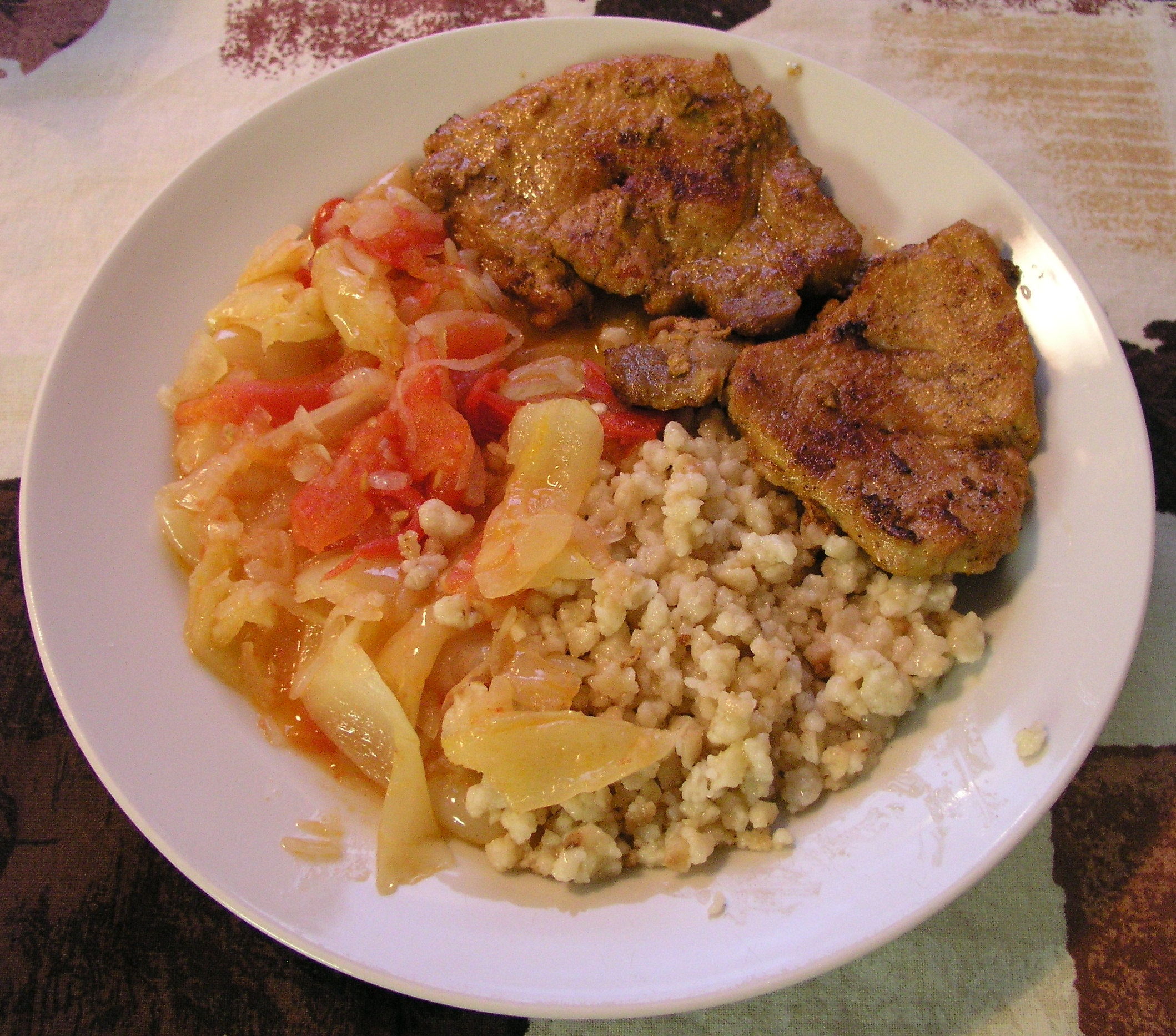
Fried and boiled tarhonya as side dish

Tarhonya (Hungarian: [ˈtɒrhoɲɒ]) or tarhoňa (Slovak: [ˈtarɦɔɲa]) is a dried egg- and wheat-based ingredient found in Hungarian and Slovak cuisine.

The ingredient was adapted from tarhana, which was introduced to Hungarians by the Ottoman Turks in the 16th century. The "barley" moniker is derived from its superficial resemblance to cooked pearl barley. Because of the relatively large size of the flakes, it is sometimes considered a type of small dumpling.

Tarhonya already appears in 16th-century handwritten Hungarian cookbooks. It is a simple product made of water, wheat flour, and whole eggs, that is formed into barley-sized "grains" by hand, or by cutting or grating.

The grains, once dried and stored, can be roasted and then boiled before being used in a variety of dishes. They are served with meat or vegetable stews, egg dishes, roasted poultry, fried sausages, or in salads. In Hungary, tarhonya is sometimes fried in butter or lard before boiling.

== See also ==
- Farfel
- Ptitim (Israeli couscous)
