= Farfel =

Small pellet-shaped or flake-shaped pasta

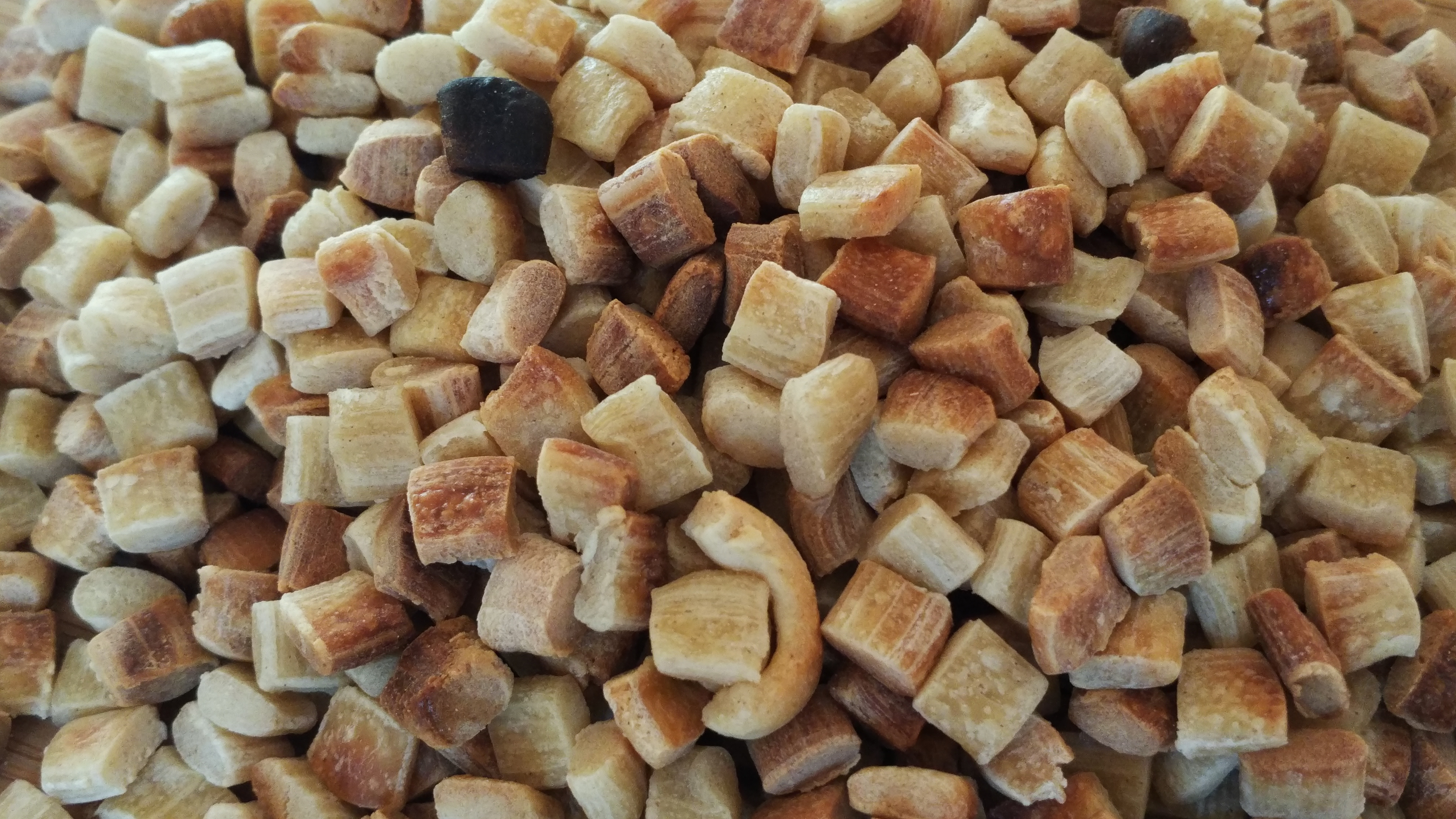
- Type: Pasta
- Main ingredients: Egg noodle dough

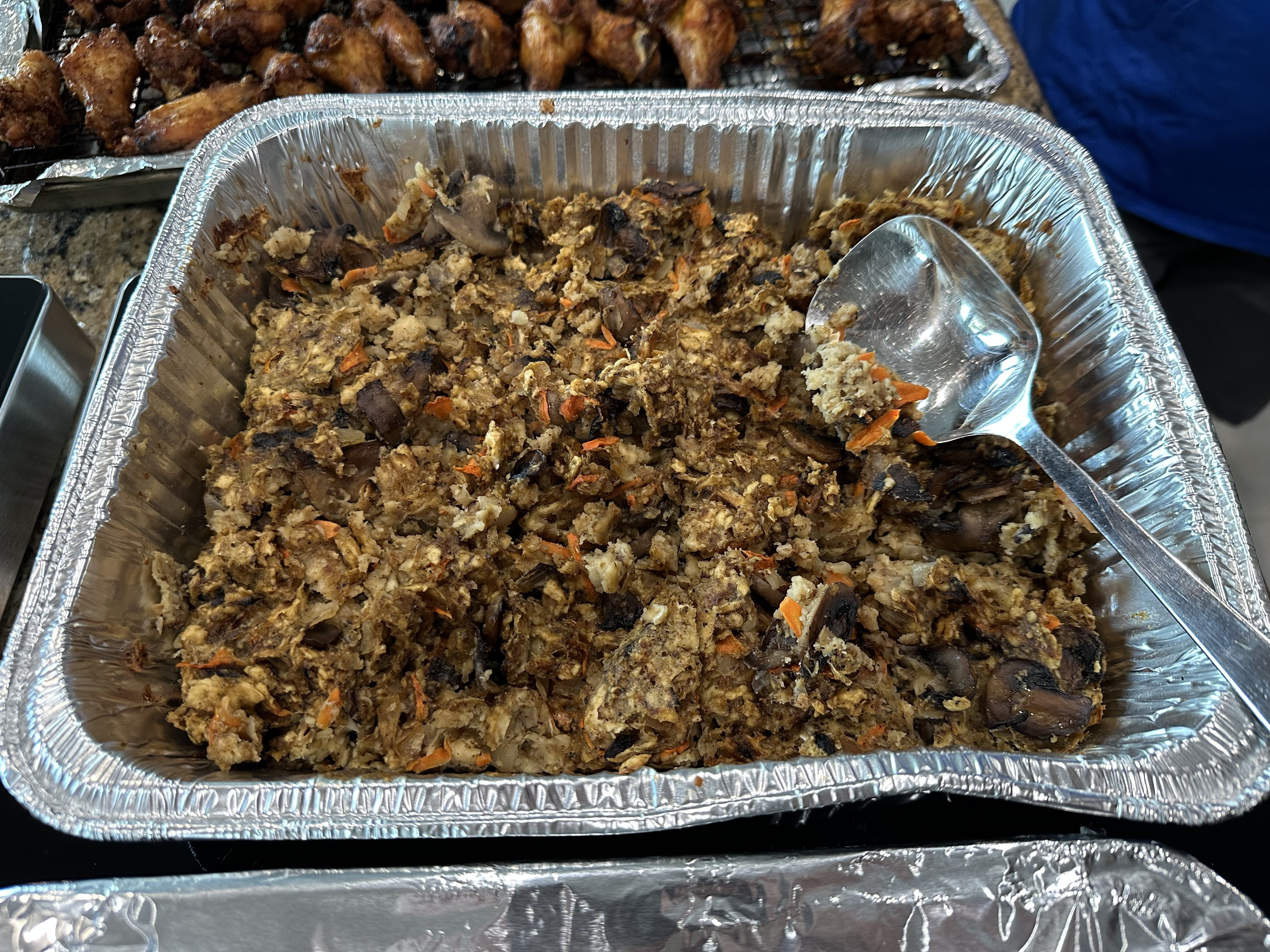
A tray of matzah and mushroom farfel served on Passover

Farfel (Yiddish: פֿאַרפֿל, romanized: farfl; from Middle High German: varveln) is small pellet- or flake-shaped pasta used in Ashkenazi Jewish cuisine. It is made from a Jewish egg noodle dough and is frequently toasted before being cooked. It can be served in soups or as a side dish. In the United States, it can also be found pre-packaged as egg barley.

During the Jewish holiday of Passover, when dietary laws pertaining to grains are observed, "matzah farfel" takes the place of the egg noodle version. Matzah farfel is simply matzah broken into small pieces.

The Baal Shem Tov, founder of the Hasidic movement, is said to have eaten farfel every Friday night because the word was similar to the word farfaln which means "wiped out, over and finished". He considered the noodles symbolic of the end of the old week.

== See also ==
- Ptitim
- Lokshen
- Çorbalık kesme
- Tarhonya
