= Noodle kugel =

Traditional Ashkenazi Jewish noodle casserole

Noodle Kugel
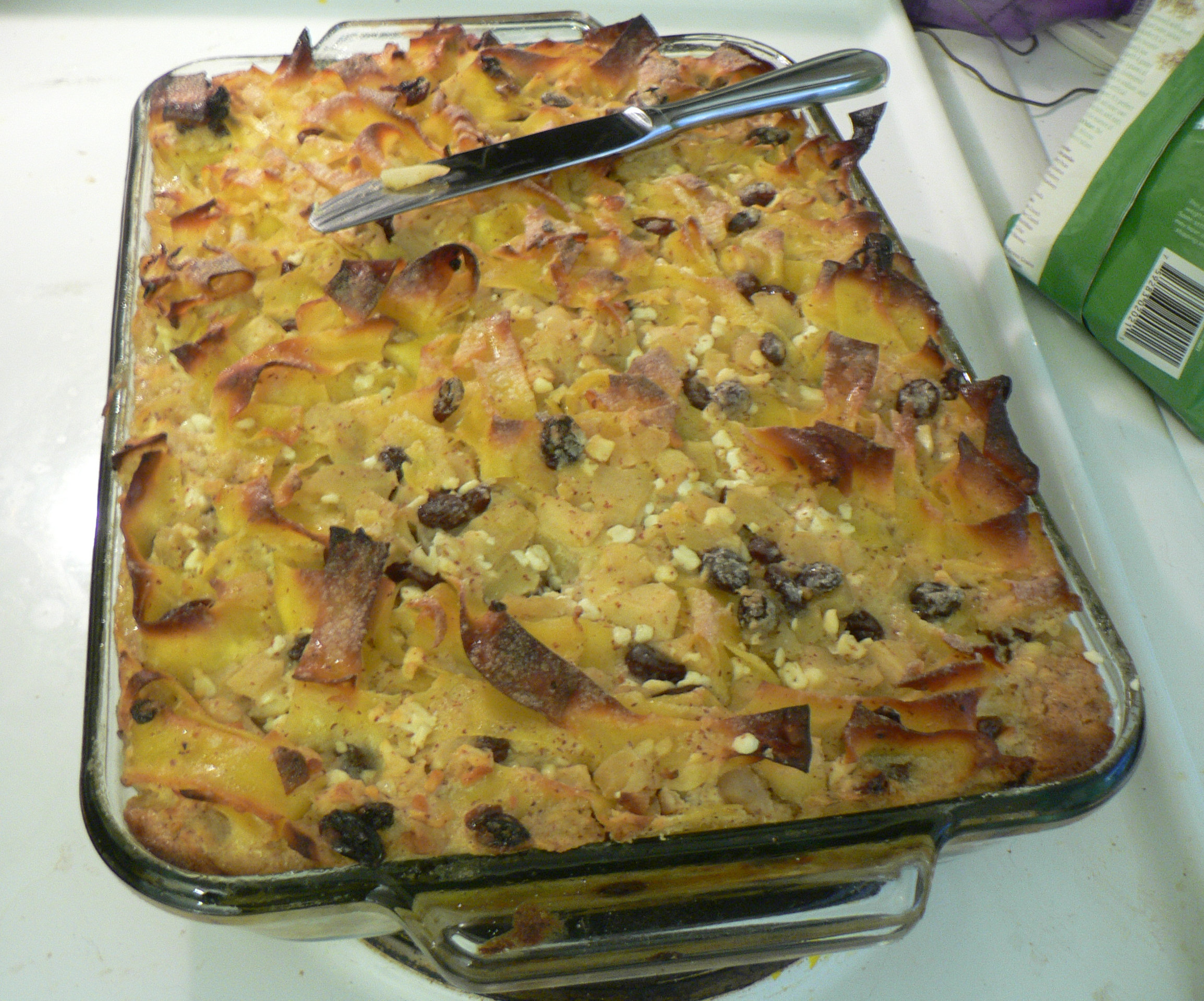
- Type: Kugel or casserole
- Course: Side dish
- Place of origin: Jewish from Russia, Eastern Europe and Central Europe. Today mostly in Israel, the United States, France, Canada, United Kingdom, Australia, Argentina, South Africa, and other communities in the Jewish diaspora.
- Created by: Ashkenazi Jews
- Serving temperature: Cold, room temp, sometimes warm
- Main ingredients: Lokshen noodles, eggs, sugar, vanilla, cinnamon, oftentimes raisins or other dried fruit, can be made with dairy or pareve ingredients, if dairy: cottage cheese, sour cream, cream cheese, butter, milk, ricotta, farmers cheese are common, if pareve: cooking oil or margarine, applesauce, toppings include cornflakes, streusel and crushed graham crackers
- Variations: Kugel Yerushalmi

Noodle kugel (לאָקשן־קוגל lokshen kugel, pronounced [ˈkʊɡl̩]), also known as lokshen kugel or kigel, is an Ashkenazi Jewish casserole that is traditionally served as a side dish and popular variety of kugel made with lokshen noodles and either a variety of dairy or pareve ingredients, often served on Shabbat and Jewish holidays.

== Etymology ==
The name of the dish comes from the Yiddish word kugel meaning 'sphere, globe, ball'; thus the Yiddish name likely originated as a reference to the round balls of dough that were placed in the center of the cholent, a traditional Shabbat stew, to cook alongside it and absorb its flavors for its later use as a side dish. The kugel later would evolve into its present form sometime in the 13th century CE.

== History ==
Though sweet noodle kugels predominate, there is a wide range of noodle kugel varieties ranging from sweet, slightly sweet, to savory. They may be baked in a large casserole dish or in individual ramekins. Noodle kugels often contain raisins or other dried fruits, though some choose to omit these as a personal preference. They were traditionally either topped with a cinnamon streusel or more commonly not topped at all, however beginning in the 20th century noodle kugels began to be topped with a variety of toppings including crushed cornflakes.

The Lithuanian Jews (also known as Litvaks) are known for their preference for dishes seasoned with a fair amount of salt and pepper and are said to be the progenitors of many of the savory noodle kugels, while the Polish Jews (those from southeastern Poland also known as Galitzianers) are known for their preference for sweet dishes and are said to be progenitors of many of the sweet noodle kugels. When the Jews fled antisemitic oppression and pogroms in Eastern Europe and found refuge in North America since at least the 19th century, more Jews emigrated from Poland than Lithuania, which resulted in the Polish Jews and Galitzianers having a larger influence on American Jewish cuisine and the later predominance of the sweet noodle kugel that would appear in North America.

== Variations ==
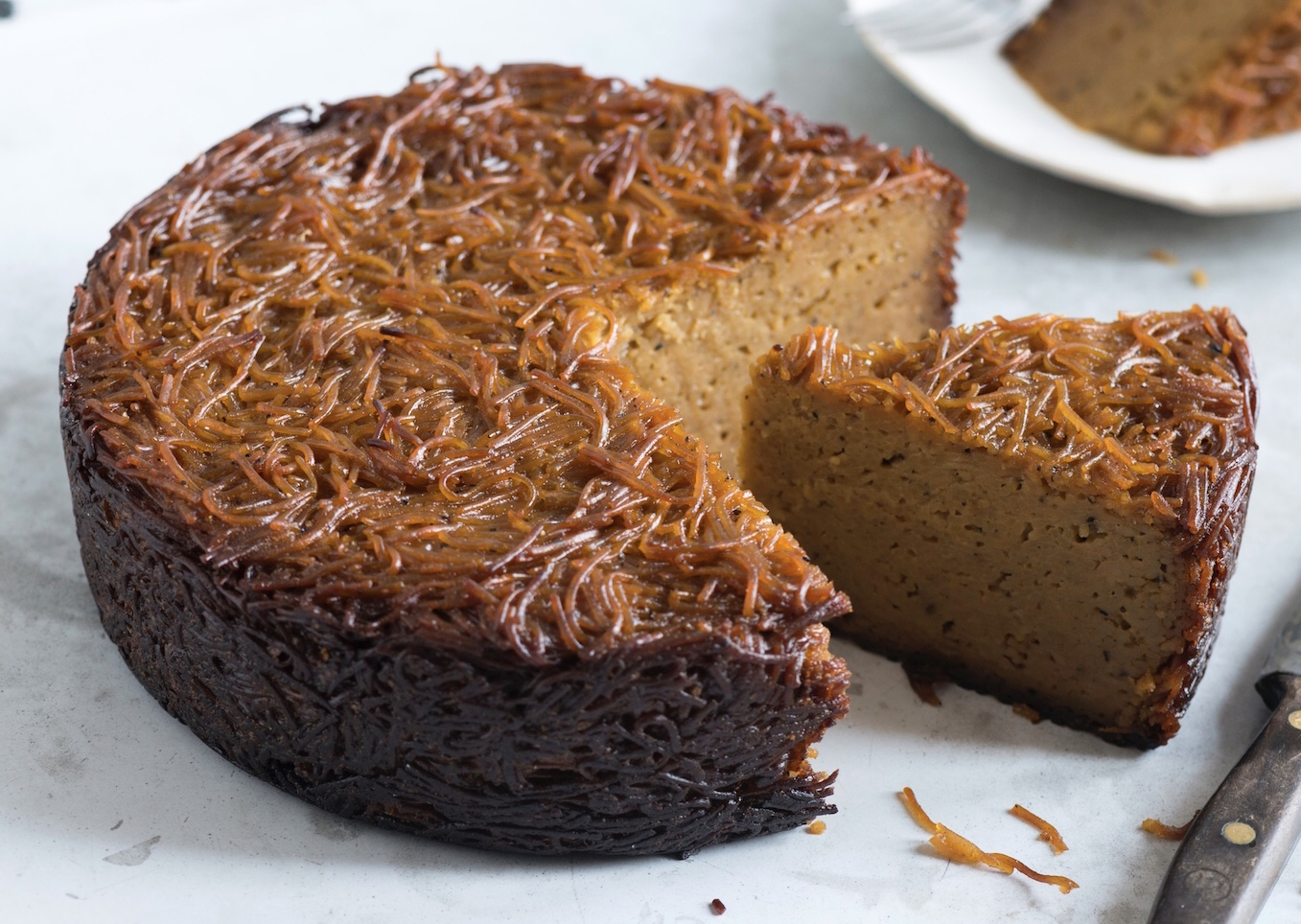
Jerusalem kugel

Sweet noodle kugel is the most common variation of noodle kugel, and is frequently made at home by those in the Jewish community especially for various Jewish holidays and Shabbat. It is also a popular dish at various Jewish delis and restaurants.

Though some prefer their noodle kugels without any additional toppings, as they enjoy the traditional crispy top of the kugel, consisting of lokshen noodle poking through the surface of the kugel and getting crispy through the baking process, many also prefer their noodle kugel to be topped with a variety of toppings including various crushed cereals such as cornflakes. A streusel or crumb topping was first popularized by the German Jews. Jews in the American South top their noodle kugels with pecan pralines. Savory noodle kugels may be topped with breadcrumbs, similar to a macaroni and cheese.

A cornflake topping for sweet noodle kugels, typically for those containing dairy ingredients and not pareve, was first popularized in the early 20th century in the United States as the confluence of American and Ashkenazi Jewish cuisine. This topping is prepared by pulverizing cornflakes either by hand or with a food processor, and then mixing them with sugar, cinnamon and melted butter. The sweet noodle kugel is prepared and then the topping is placed either prior to baking or in the middle of the baking process.

== See also ==
- Cuisine of Israel
- Potato kugel
- List of casserole dishes
- Potatonik
- Jerusalem kugel
