= Yerushalmi Kugel =

Baked casserole from Jerusalem

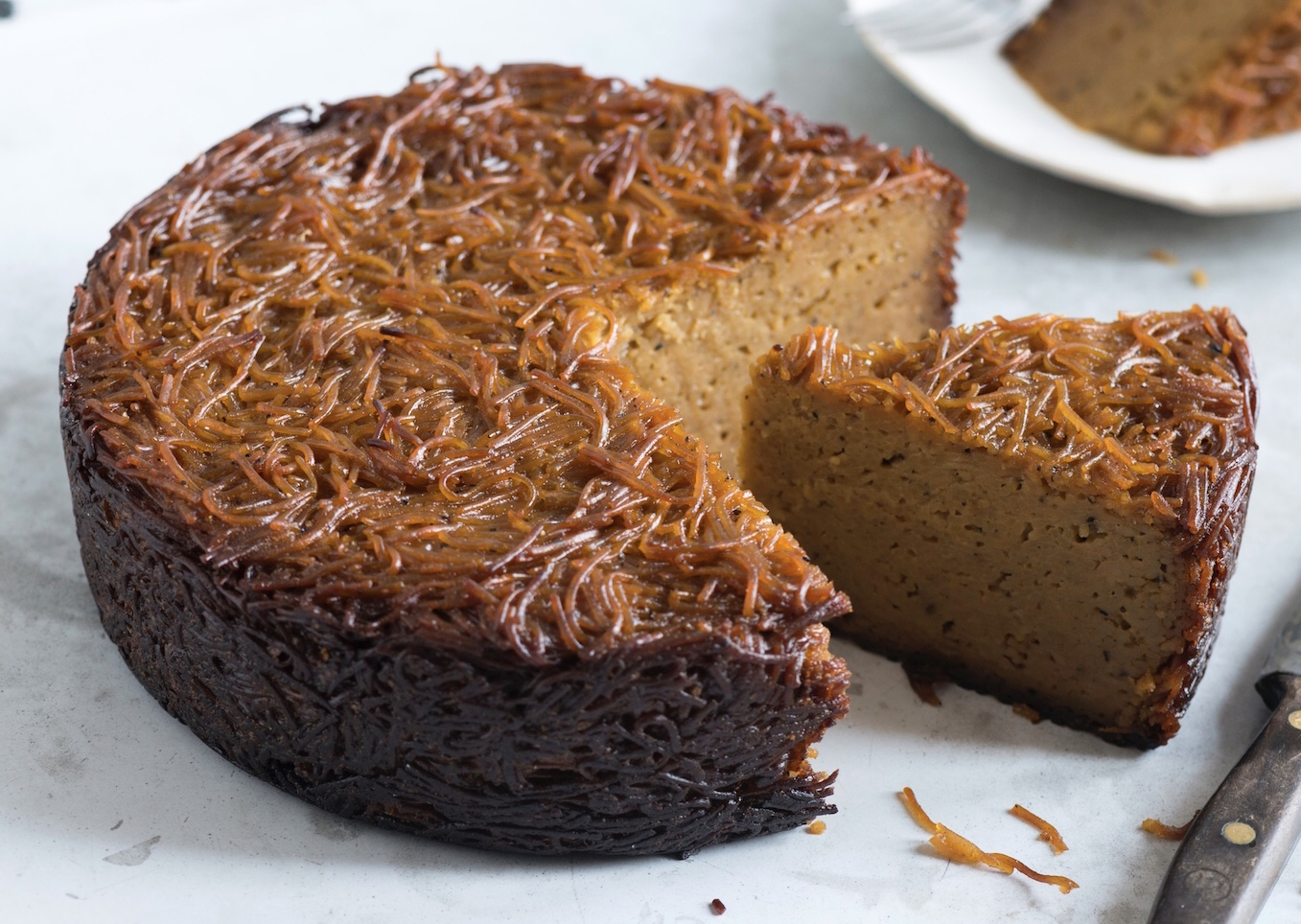
- Yerushalmi Kugel
- Alternative names: Jerusalem kugel
- Type: Kugel
- Place of origin: Jerusalem, Ottoman Empire
- Region or state: Israel
- Created by: Old Yishuv followers of the Gaon of Vilna
- Main ingredients: Noodles, caramel, black pepper

Yerushalmi Kugel (Hebrew: קוגל ירושלמי, romanized: kūgel yerūshálmi), also known as Jerusalem kugel, is an Israeli kugel originating from the local Jewish community of Jerusalem in the 18th century. The dish is served on Shabbat and on Jewish holidays.

== History ==
Yerushalmi Kugel is said to have been created in Jerusalem in the 18th century by local Ashkenazi Jewish followers of the Vilna Gaon, known as Perushim.

== Overview ==
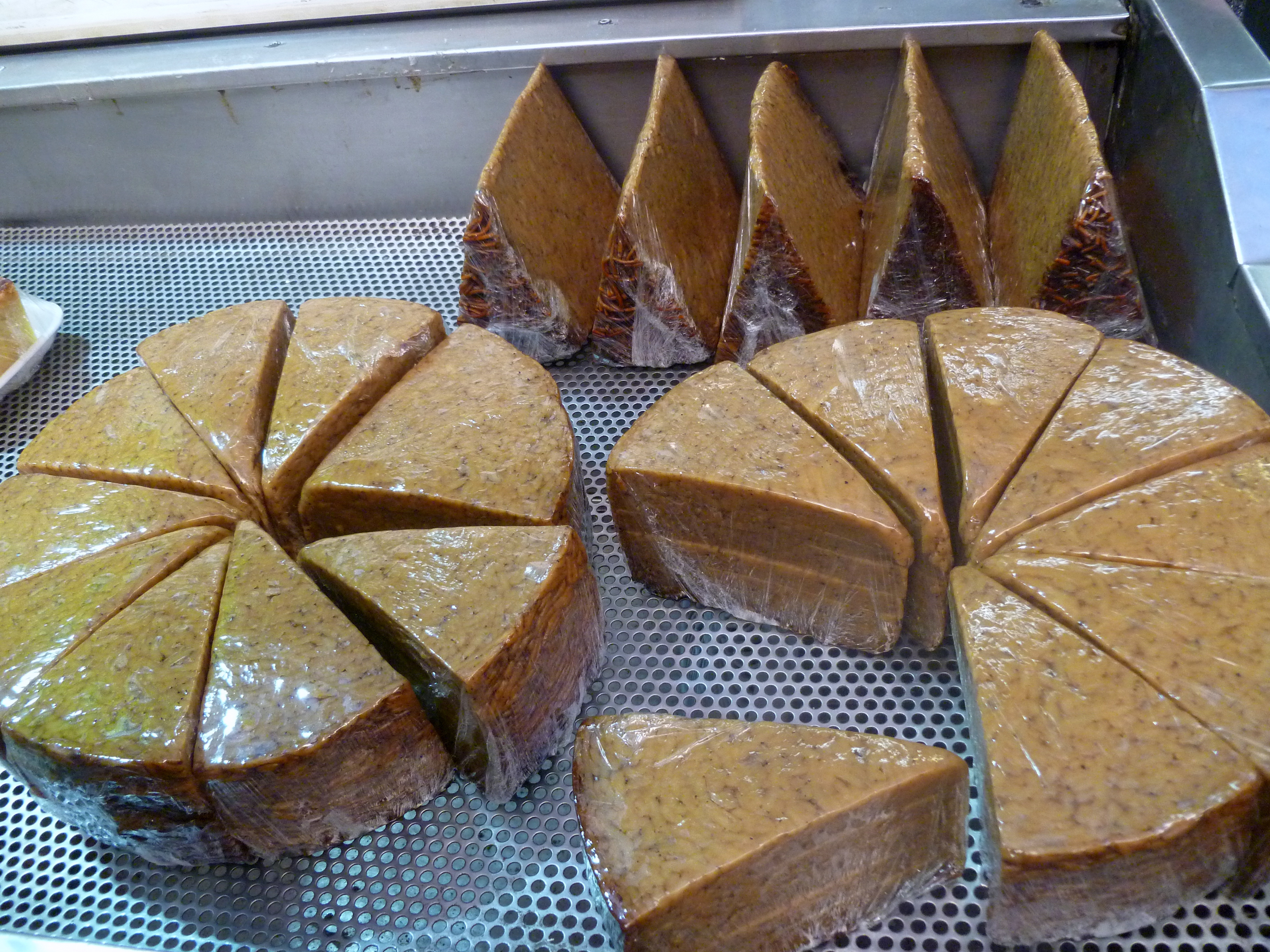
Yerushalmi Kugel sliced and packaged for sale

Jerusalem kugel differs from other traditional Ashkenazi style noodle kugels in a number of ways, incorporating caramel and black pepper, ingredients less accessible in Europe. Nonetheless, it has become a staple of Ashkenazi foods.

Jerusalem kugel is always made with thin egg noodles, similar in appearance to spaghetti. The defining ingredient of Jerusalem kugel is black pepper, which is uncommon in other varieties of kugel, and which can give it what the New York Times food writer Melissa Clark has described as a "sinus-clearing" potency. It is made with a sauce similar to caramel, which the noodles are then coated with and then seasoned with black pepper before being placed in a baking pan (either a pan with a hole in the middle similar to a Bundt pan, or a round and flat pan similar to a cake pan), and placed in the oven to bake.

Jerusalem kugel does not typically contain dairy and is pareve.

== See also ==
- Israeli cuisine
- Jewish cuisine
- Cuisine of Jerusalem
- Potato kugel
