= Potatonik =

Potato-based dishes

- Main ingredients: Potatoes, onions, flour, yeast

Potatonik may refer to two distinct potato-based dishes derived from Ashkenazi Jewish cuisine. One version is a hybrid between potato kugel and bread, containing shredded potatoes and onions as well as ample flour and leavened with yeast. Another dish, apparently unrelated but called by the same name, is essentially a very large latke meant to be cut into wedges at the table. It is also known as geribinik.

"Potatonik" is an Anglicization of the Yiddish kartoflnik that appeared in Ashkenazi-American communities – the word kartofl is one of many Yiddish terms for potato, and the suffix -nik indicates something associated with a specified thing or quality and creates an "agent noun" in Slavic languages.

According to food writer Joel Haber, "kartoflnik uniquely started with raw, grated potatoes, rather than cooked and mashed ones [as is done with potato breads]. Thus, [kartoflnik] held onto its potato-y flavor, while also remaining a member of the kugel family." A related dish, ulnik, used buckwheat flour with grated potato, but no yeast.
