= Farfalle =

Italian butterfly-shaped pasta

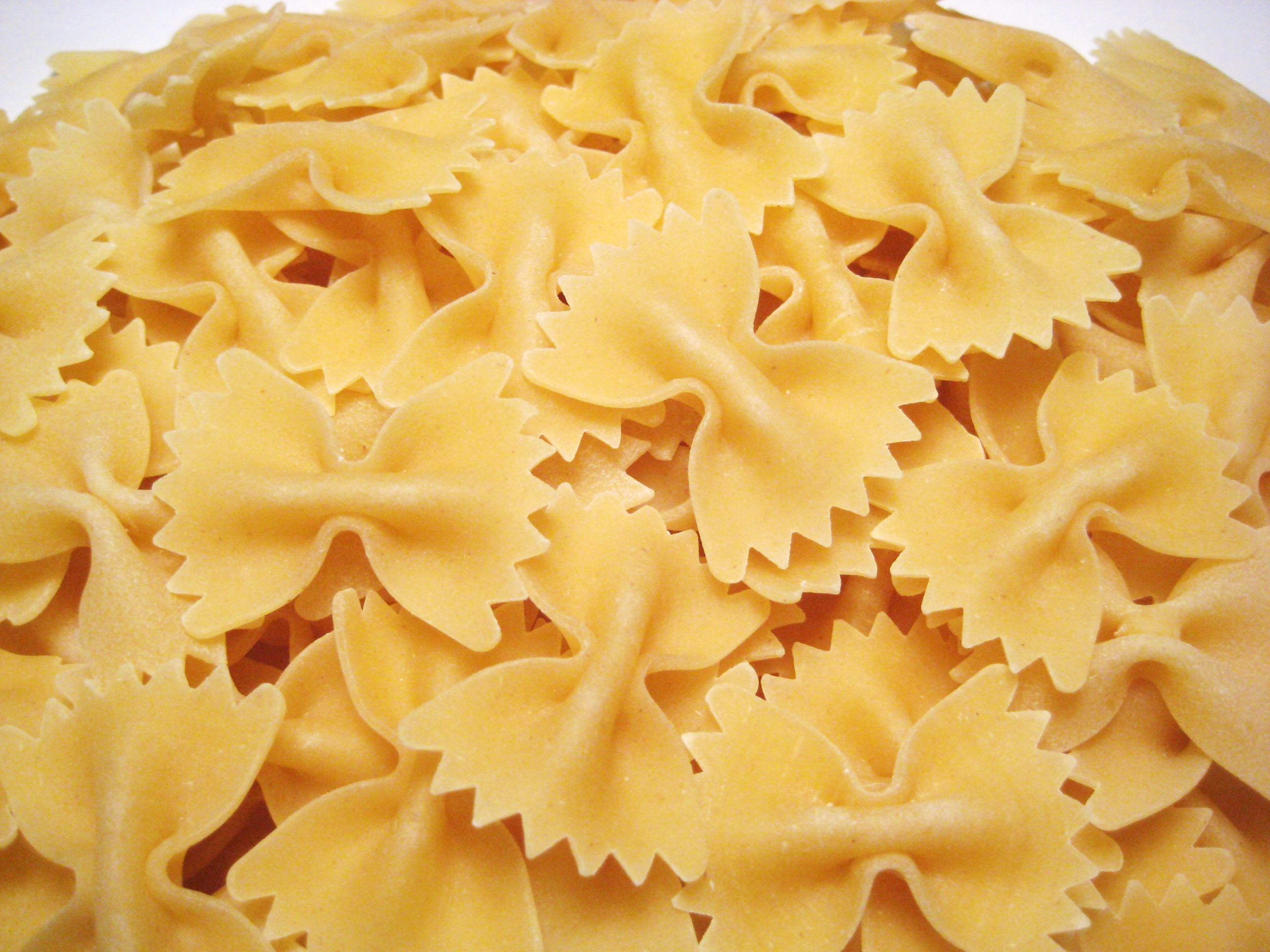
- Uncooked farfalle pasta
- Alternative names: Strichetti, bow tie (United States)
- Type: Pasta
- Place of origin: Italy
- Region or state: Lombardy; Emilia-Romagna
- Main ingredients: Durum wheat
- Variations: Farfalle rigate, farfalloni, farfalline

Farfalle (Italian: [farˈfalle]) are a type of pasta. The name is derived from the Italian word farfalle ('butterflies'). In the Italian region of Emilia-Romagna, farfalle are known as strichetti (a local word for 'bow ties'). A larger variation of farfalle is known as farfalloni, while the miniature version is called farfalline. Farfalle date back to the 16th century in the Lombardy and Emilia-Romagna regions of Italy.

== Varieties ==
Farfalle come in several sizes, but they all have a distinctive "butterfly" shape. Usually, the farfalle are formed from a rectangle or oval of pasta, with two of the sides trimmed to a ruffled edge and the center pinched together to make the unusual shape of the pasta. A ridged version of the pasta is known as farfalle rigate.

In addition to durum wheat and plain, whole-wheat varieties, colors are added by mixing certain ingredients into the dough, which also affects the flavor (as with any pasta). For example, beetroot can be used for red, spinach for green, and cuttlefish ink for black. Green, white, and red varieties are often sold together in a mix that reflects the colors of the flag of Italy.

== See also ==
Media related to Farfalle at Wikimedia Commons

- List of pasta
