= Potato kugel =

Kugel of Ashkenazi Jewish origin

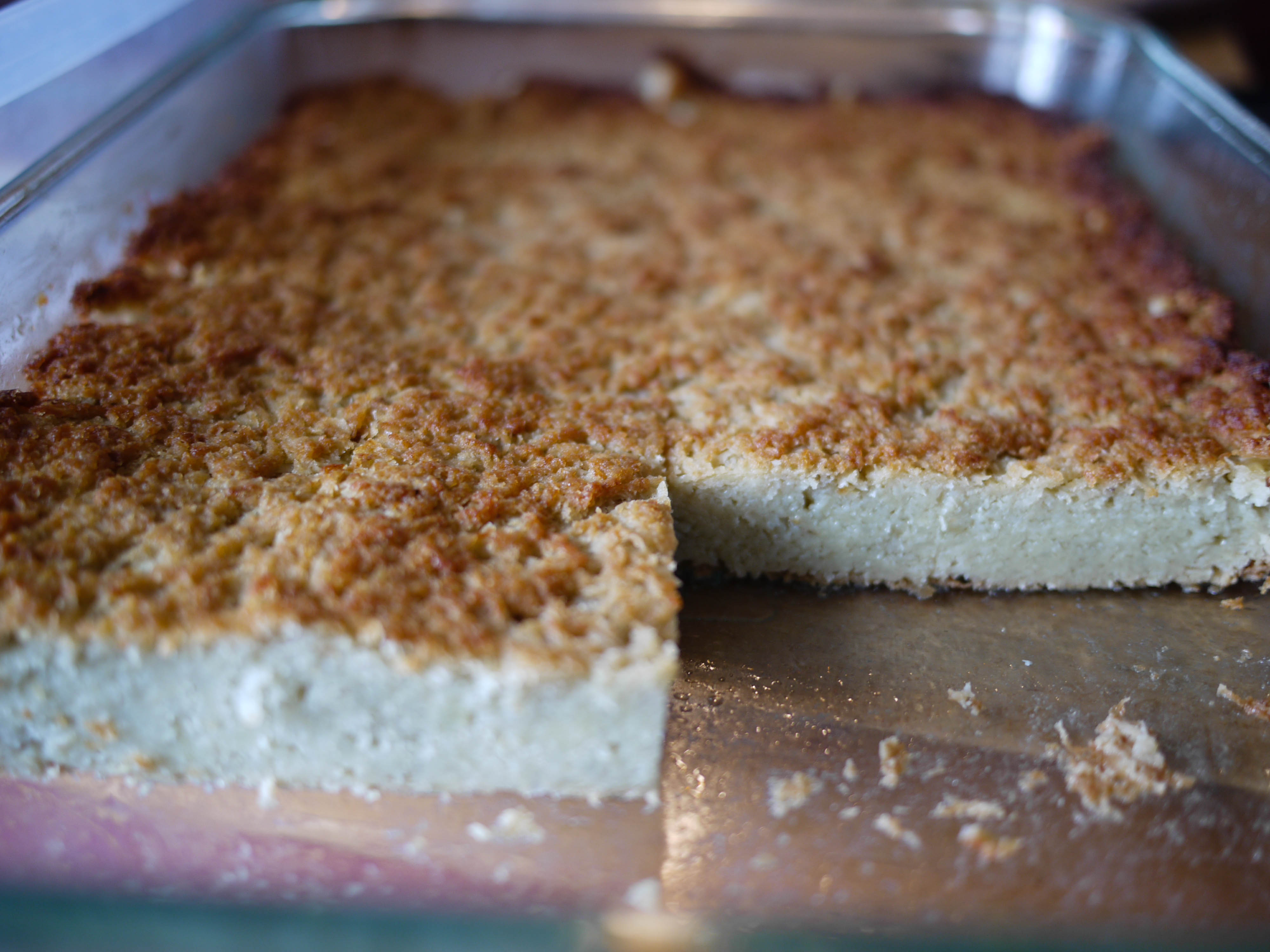
A rectangular potato kugel, partially eaten

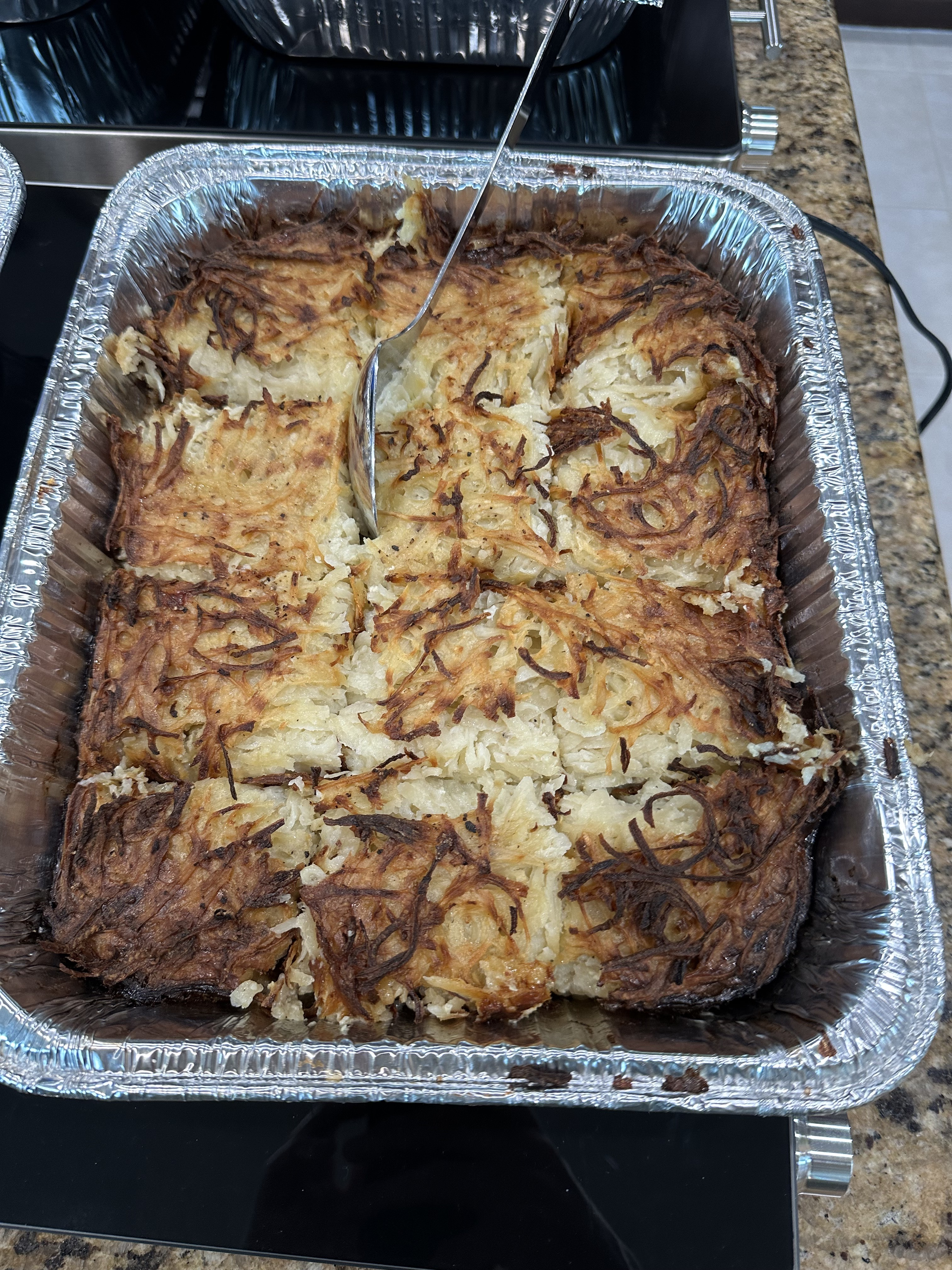
A tray of potato kugel served on Passover

Potato kugel is a potato-based kugel of Ashkenazi Jewish origin, made with grated or pureed potatoes, onions, eggs, flour or matzo meal, oil, salt and pepper.

== Overview ==
It is commonly served for Shabbat and other Jewish holidays. It is more similar to a latke than it is to a noodle kugel, as there are sweet variations of noodle kugel but all potato kugel are savory dishes. Potato kugel is typically made in a large casserole dish, although it is also sometimes prepared in individual ramekins. Potato kugel can be made with grated potatoes, which gives it a crispier texture, or it can be made with potatoes puréed in a food processor, creating a "pudding-like consistency" according to Jewish chef Jamie Geller.

Some modern cooks add a small amount of baking powder. The powder's alkaline chemistry breaks down the potatoes and produces a smoother texture while promoting browning.

== See also ==
- Latke
- Noodle kugel
