= Big Three (Sweden) =

Group of Swedish association football clubs

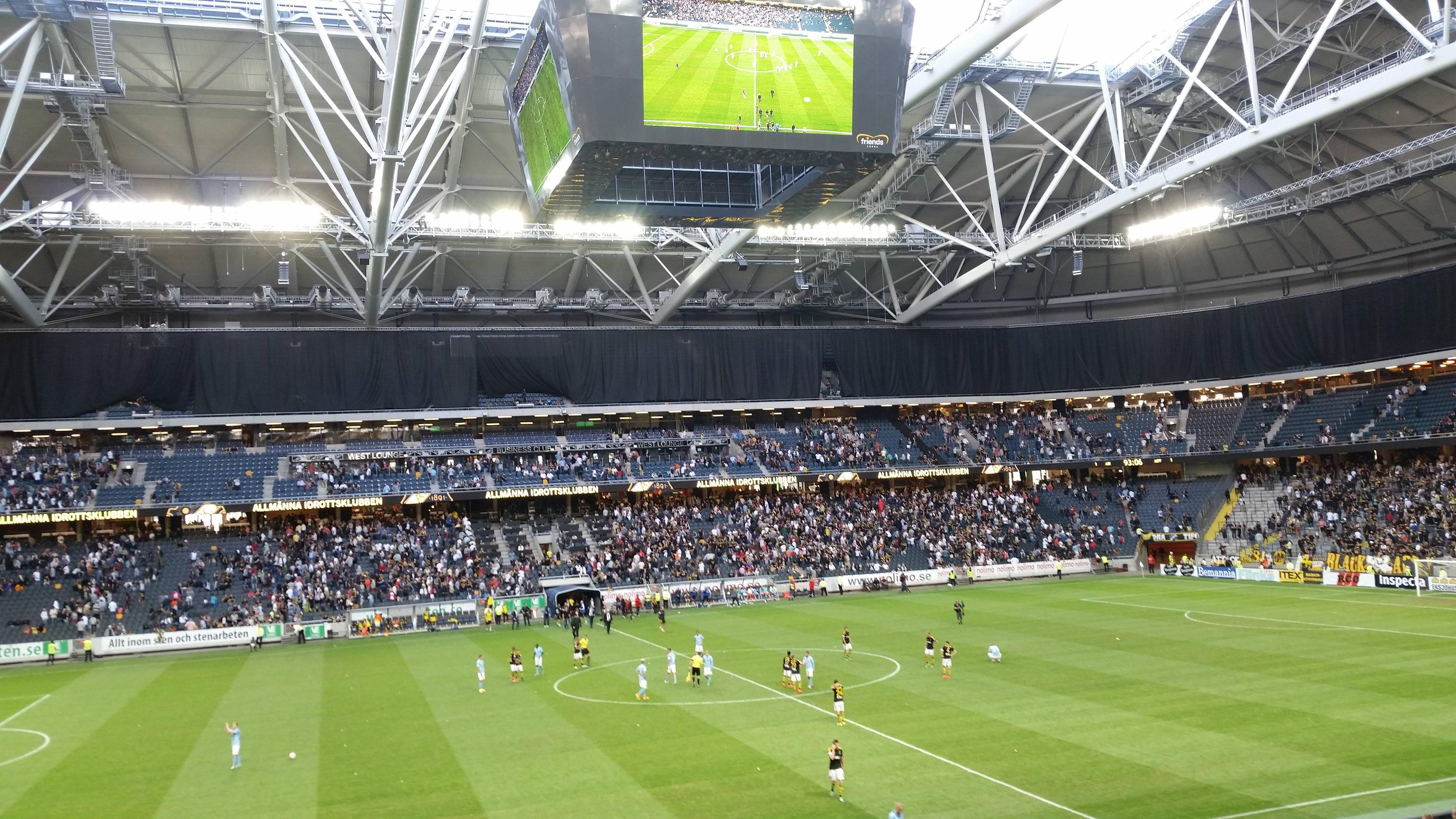
Strawberry Arena, Stockholm

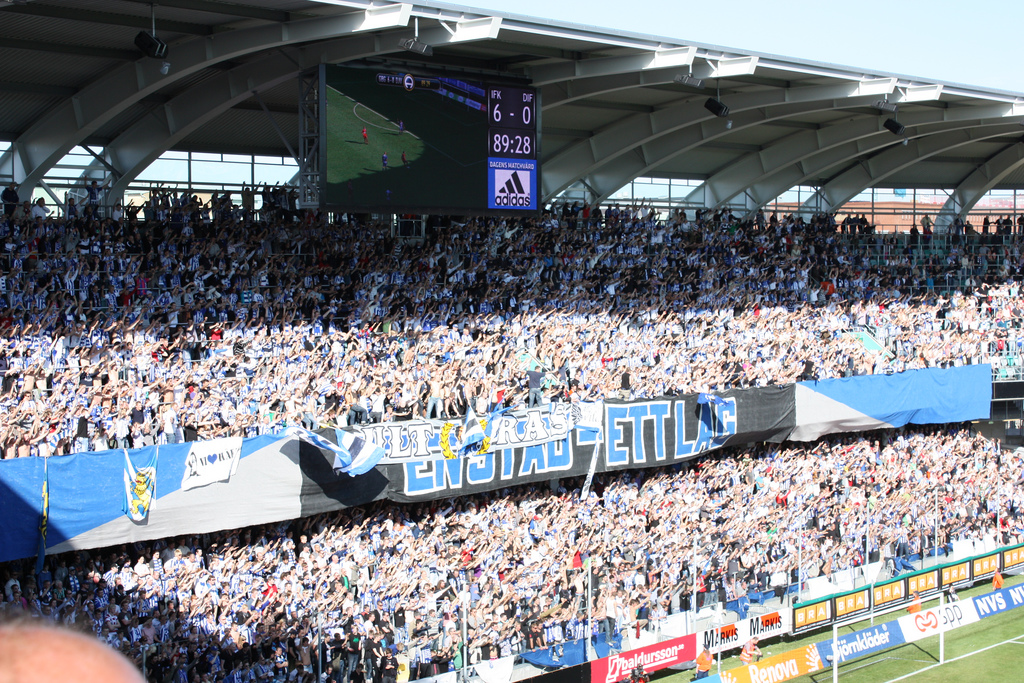
Gamla Ullevi, Gothenburg

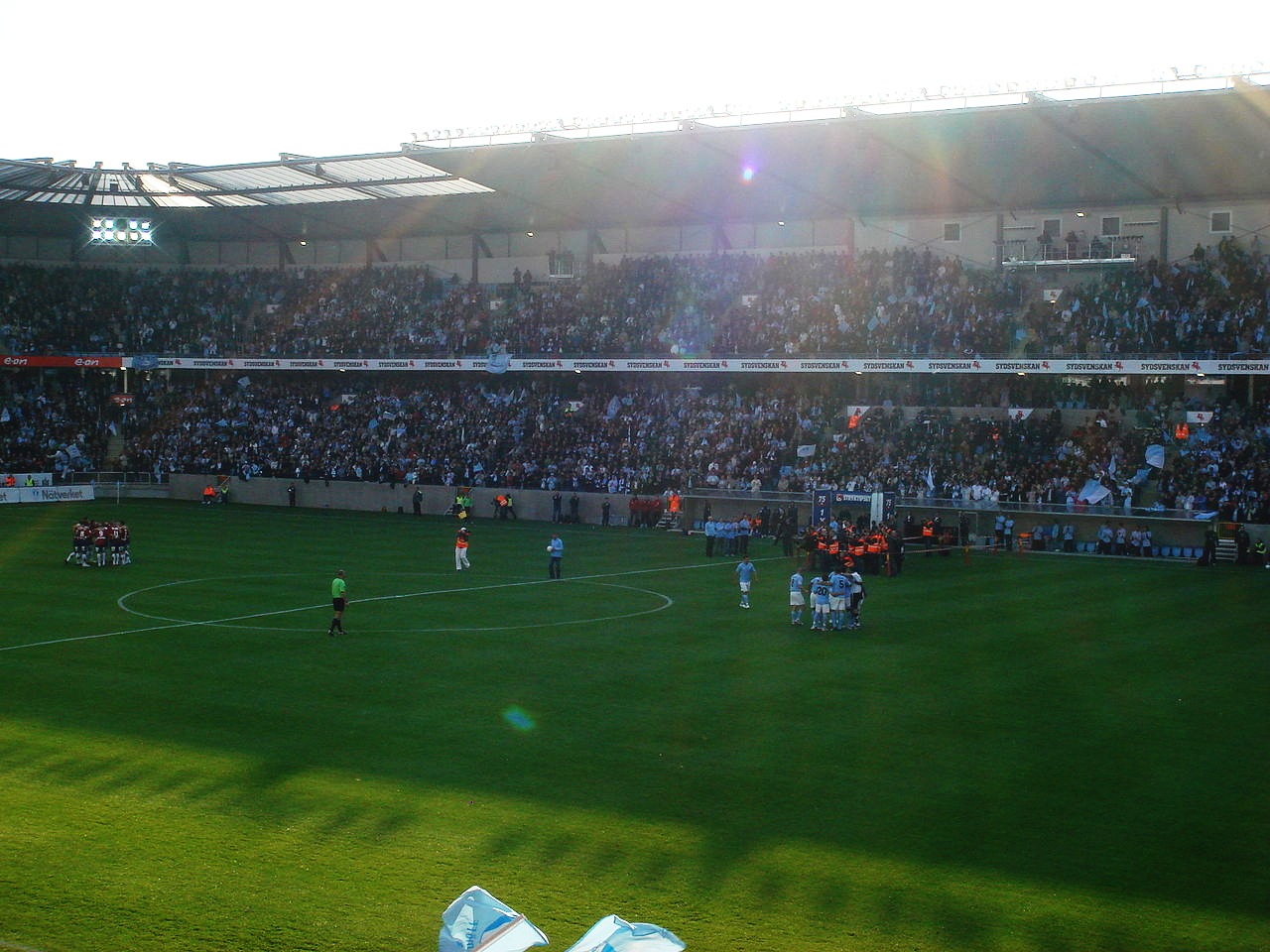
Stadion, Malmö

Location of the three clubs in Sweden

The Big Three (Clubs) (Swedish: De tre största (klubbarna)) is a phrase used to refer to the three most successful football clubs in Sweden by authors, journalists, club representatives, and supporters. The three clubs AIK from Stockholm, IFK Göteborg from Gothenburg, and Malmö FF from Malmö have a combined 50 out of 119 Swedish championship titles, 30 out of 64 Svenska Cupen titles, and occupy the top three places in the All-time Allsvenskan table.

Malmö FF lead the all-time Allsvenskan table, but AIK have played the most seasons in the highest league. The three have led the all-time table for 83 out of 95 seasons, and no other club has led the table since 1937. As for Swedish championship titles, the Malmö side have 24, IFK Göteborg have 18, while AIK is trailing with 12 in fourth place, behind IFK Norrköping and their 13 titles. In the national cup, Malmö FF have won 16 times, IFK Göteborg and AIK share the second place with 8 titles each. IFK Göteborg and Malmö FF are the only clubs to have reached the final of a European competition, IFK Göteborg having won the UEFA Cup in 1981–82 and again in 1986–87 while Malmö FF were runners-up in the 1978–79 European Cup.

As IFK Göteborg distanced itself from its old informal alliance, Göteborgsalliansen, with the other Gothenburg clubs in the 1970s, they instead established a closer cooperation with Malmö FF and AIK under the partnership name "The Three Traditional Teams of Sweden" for some time. Football historian Torbjörn Andersson refers to the three clubs as Sweden's three "proper large clubs" ("verkliga storklubbar").

The Swedish football magazine Offside ranked the largest clubs in Sweden in 2010 by defining five categories ("national honours", "international honours", "excellence", "attendance", and "trend") in which AIK ranked 4th, 3rd, 5th, 1st, and 1st, IFK Göteborg ranked 2nd, 1st, 2nd, 2nd, and 3rd, and Malmö FF ranked 1st, 2nd, 1st, 4th, and 2nd. Totalling the scores of each category, Malmö FF ranked first scoring 87 points narrowly beating IFK who scored 85 points, with AIK third at 79 points. The fourth-ranked club Djurgårdens IF scored 60 points in total, the only other club together with IFK Norrköping outside the big three that managed to rank top 3 in any category. AIK, IFK Göteborg and Malmö FF are also the three clubs that have contributed with the most players, as well as the most caps, to the Sweden national team.

== Rivalries ==
The fixture between AIK and IFK Göteborg, the two largest clubs from the two largest cities, has been called the "Swedish El Clásico". The two clubs have, besides some Swedish local derbies, the largest rivalry in Swedish football. Fixtures between the clubs gather the largest nationwide interest out of any Swedish club fixtures.

The rivalry between the two most successful clubs in terms of honours, IFK Göteborg and Malmö FF, is sometimes called "Mesta mästarmötet" (English: Clash of the greatest champions).

== Honours ==
Team	Champ (Note: The Swedish football champions have been decided through four different tournaments: Svenska Mästerskapet 1896–1925, Allsvenskan 1931–1981 and 1993–, Allsvenskan play-offs 1982–1990, and Mästerskapsserien 1991–1992. No champions were declared 1926–1930.)	National leagues			National cups				International
Team	Champ	AS	MS	SvS	ASPO	SvM	SvC	SvSC	UC
AIK	12	6	1	0	0	6	8	1	0
IFK Göteborg	18	13	1	5	5	6	8	1	2
Malmö FF	24	27	0	0	2	0	16	2	0

== See also ==
- Big Three (Belgium)
- Big Three (Costa Rica)
- Big Three (Greece)
- Big Three (Italy)
- Big Three (Netherlands)
- Big Three (Peru)
- Big Three (Portugal)
- Big Three (Spain)
- Big Three (Turkey)
- Big Four (Mexico)
- Big Five (Argentina)
- Big Six (Premier League)
- Big Twelve (Brazil)
- List of association football club rivalries in Europe
