= Big Three (Spain) =

Nickname of the three most successful and biggest football clubs in Spain

Santiago Bernabéu

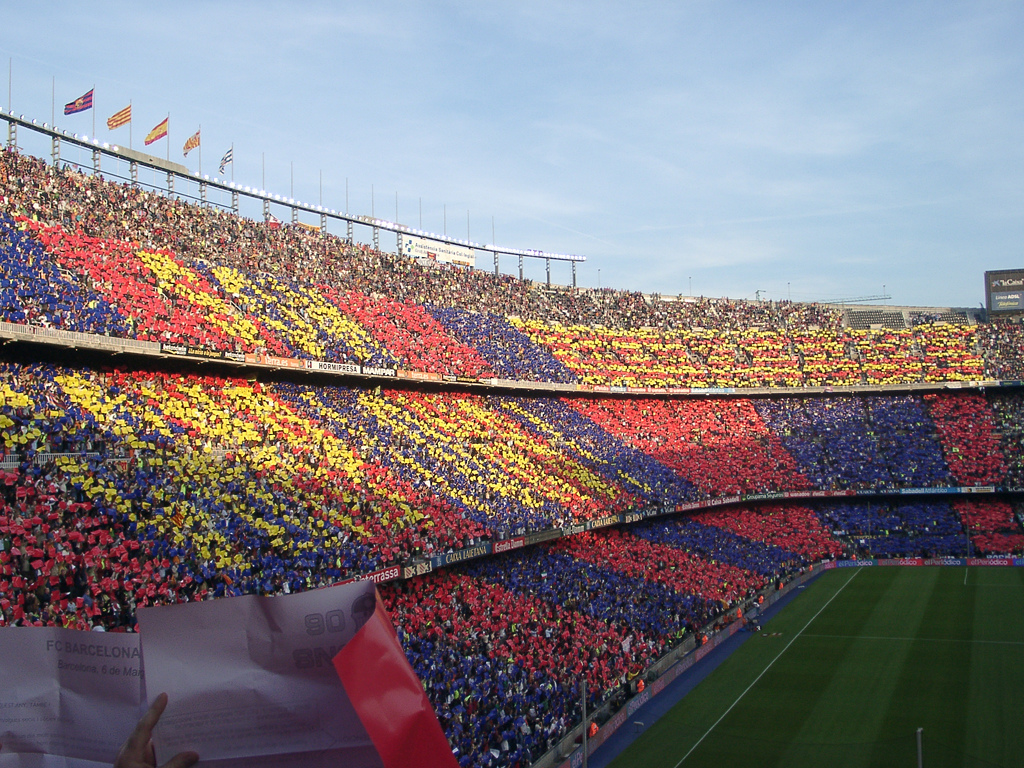
Camp Nou

Metropolitano

The Big Three (Spanish: Los Tres Grandes) is the nickname of the three most successful and biggest football clubs in Spain.

Real Madrid, Barcelona and Atlético de Madrid are, in that order, the three greatest La Liga winners, winning most of its seasons especially since the 1960s. They won all but three of the Spanish First Division since the 1984–85 season, and since the 2004–05 season no other club won this championship. Between 2012–13 and 2022–23 season, they occupied the Top 3 places at every season of it. By the year of 2025, that same order occupy the Top 3 places at the All-Time La Liga table, in which they also are the only three clubs wih more than 4.000 points accumulated in this tournament's history.

Also in that same order, this trio has the biggest amount of supporters. Blancos, blaugranas and rojiblancos also are the only three Spanish clubs regarded as "World Champions": as runner up of 1973–74 European Cup, Atleti could beat Independiente in 1974 Intercontinental Cup. Real Madrid had already won the 1960 Intercontinental Cup and would achieve also the 1998 and 2002 ones before Barça win its first world title in 2009 FIFA Club World Cup. In the FIFA tournament, Barcelona could also win in 2011 and in 2015, while Real Madrid won it in 2014, 2016, 2017, 2018, 2022 and 2024.

The proposal of European Super League, in the beginning of the 2020s, had just these three clubs to represent Spanish football. They are indeed the national clubs with best campaigns in UEFA Champions League: Real Madrid (fifteen titles, a record) and Barcelona (five) are the only Spanish teams to win it; among the non-winners, Atlético has the biggest number of finals achieved (three, one above Valencia).

== History ==
La Liga was created in 1929 and, for its first 25 years, there were more variety of winnings clubs: in 1953, prior to arrival of Alfredo Di Stéfano at Real Madrid, this club was not even among the four biggest champions of the tournament, by having just two titles, less than Barcelona (six), Athletic Bilbao (five), Atlético de Madrid (four) and Valencia (three). Also from those first years, Seville clubs had their only titles in Spanish First Division: Sevilla at 1945–46 season and Real Betis at 1934–35.

Before La Liga creation, the main national trophy was the Copa del Rey. Barcelona and Athletic, the biggest La Liga winners until the end of the 1950s, still hold by the 2020s the biggest number of titles in that Cup. Since the 1960s, however, Athletic have just two more winning seasons at La Liga, both in the 1980s. This made even the Basque media accept Athletic at outside the Big Three group of teams.

On the other hand, while Real Madrid saw a surge in the number os trophies since the mid 1950s, quickly establishing itself as the biggest winner of UEFA Champions League and La Liga, Atlético and Barcelona pass through the 1960s, 1970s and the 1980s by having just one or two La Liga number of titles as difference from each other, before the coming of Johan Cruijff as Barça manager.

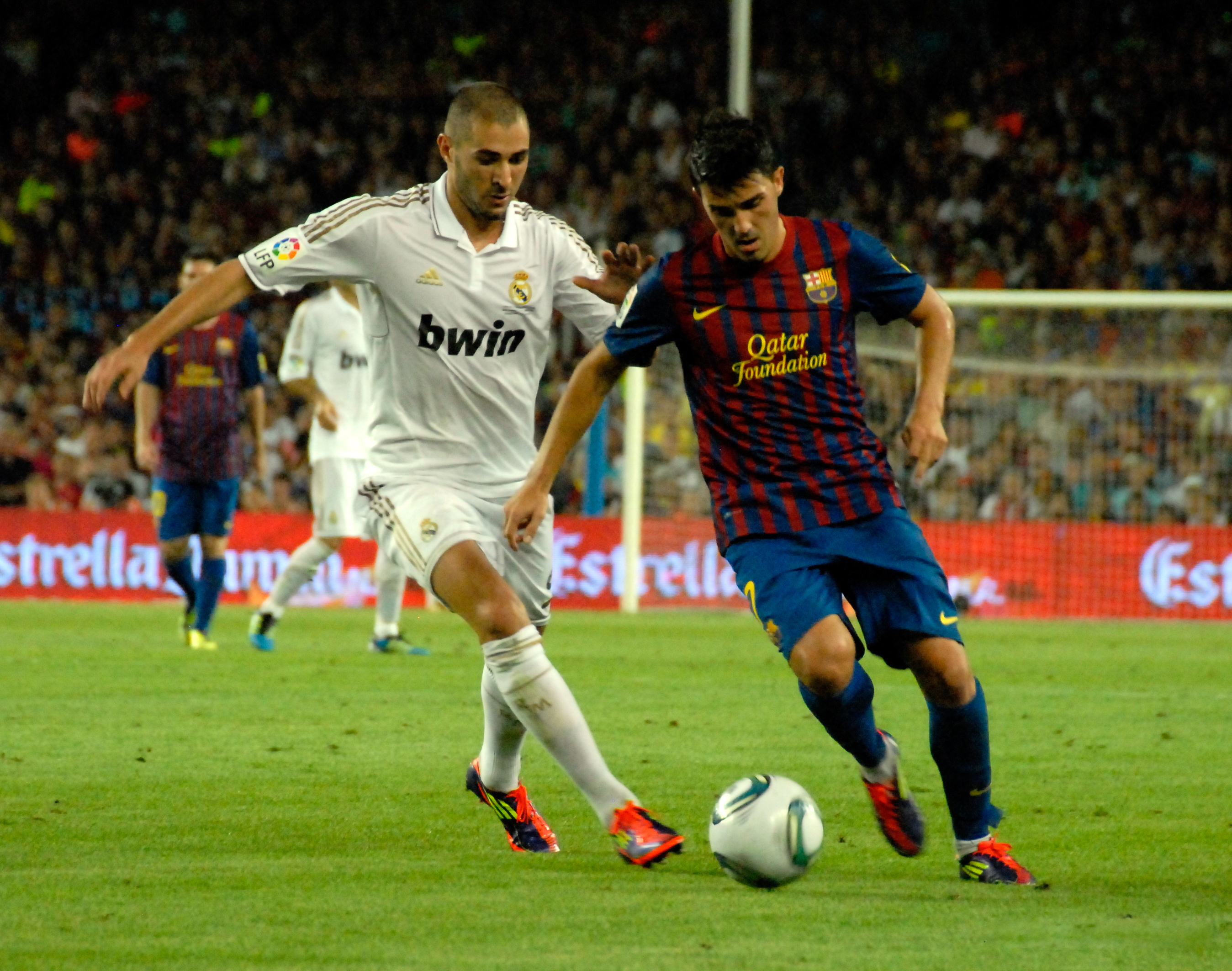
El Clásico

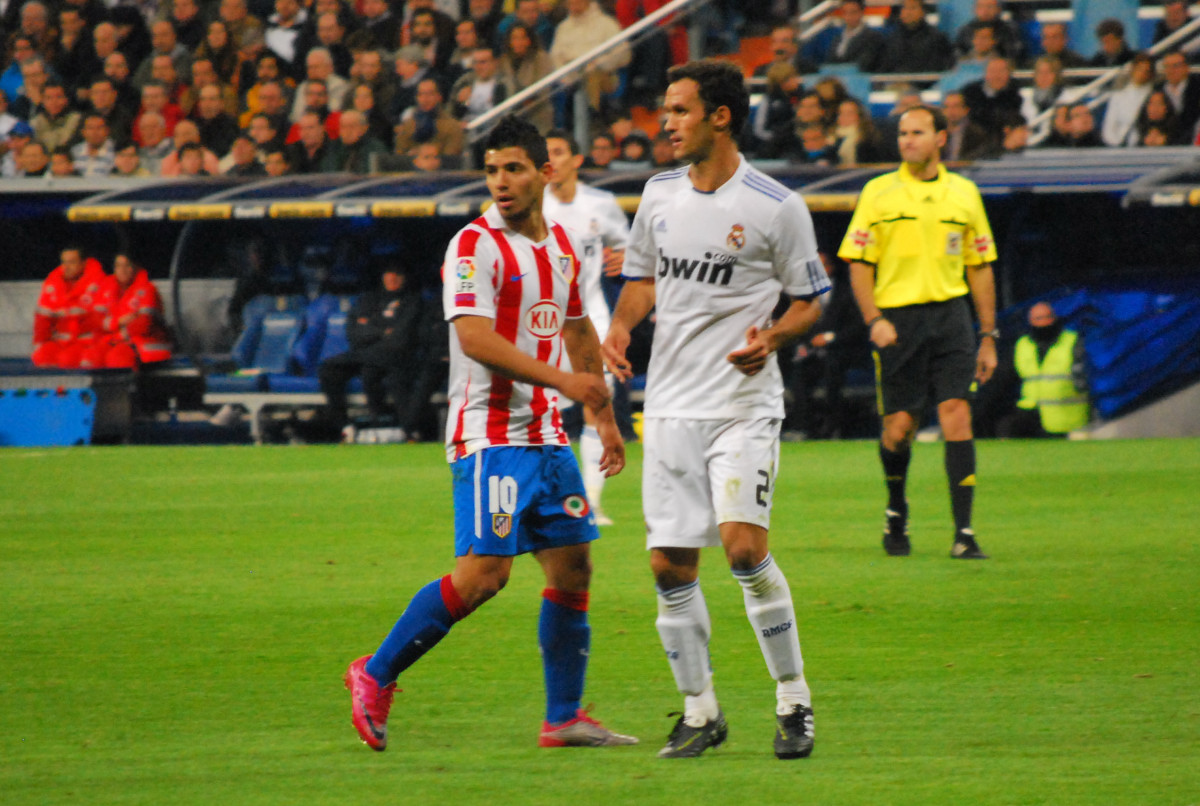
El Derbi Madrileño

El Otro Clásico

In the 20th century, the three clubs made the Top 3 final standings at La Liga by the 1944–45 season (Barcelona as champion), 1957–58 (Real Madrid as champion), 1961–62 (Real Madrid as champion), 1965–66 (Atlético de Madrid as champion) 1975–76 (Real Madrid as champion) 1990–91 and 1991–92 (Barcelona as champion in both).

The trio also had fierce races at 1948–49 season, with Barcelona being champion with three points ahead both Madrid clubs and two above runner up Valencia; 1970–71, with Valencia being champion with the same points of runner up Barcelona, one ahead Atlético and two ahead fourth placed Real Madrid; 1972–73, remembered by the uncommon fight between both Madrid teams alongside both city of Barcelona clubs, with Espanyol ending as third in a season won by Atlético; and in 1980–81, won by Real Sociedad after an unusual dispute kept with several clubs until the last journeys: this champion made 45 points, the same of Real Madrid, with Atlético ending third with 42, the same of Valencia, while Barcelona ended in fifth with 41. The four seasons (two won by Real Sociedad and another two won by Athletic Bilbao) in a row until 1983–84 remains as the biggest gap without any title of the trio at La Liga, one ahead of the three consecutive seasons played just before the Spanish Civil War.

In the three decades between the "Cruijff Era" in the 1990s and Lionel Messi years by the 2000s and 2010s, Barcelona achieved more times La Liga then the whole period between inaugural 1929 season and 1989. Atlético suffered a particular decline by most of these years, including a relegation at 1999–2000 season. Atleti supporters saw another clubs being regarded as the "third strongest" against a long Real Madrid and Barcelona duopoly: firstly with Deportivo de A Coruña in the ending of the 1990s, and then with Valencia in the beginning of the 2000s. Even in that time, however, Atlético kept mentioned as one of the Tres Grandes, and promoting itself as well. Deportivo (one time) and Valencia (two) are precisely the only Spanish champions since 1985 outside the trio.

From the 2010s onwards, Atlético re-established itself as a consistent contender for trophies. The Derbi Madrileño decided the UEFA Champions League twice and one UEFA Super Cup, while the clashes against Barcelona renewed prominence by being recognized as El Otro Clásico ("The Other Derby"). The three clubs made the Top 3 in every La Liga season between 2013 and 2023, until Girona reach a third place at 2023–24 season. Barcelona (six times Spanish champion in this 2013–2023 period), Real Madrid (three times) and Atlético (two times), in that order, would made the Top 3 again in following season although.

== People in all three clubs ==
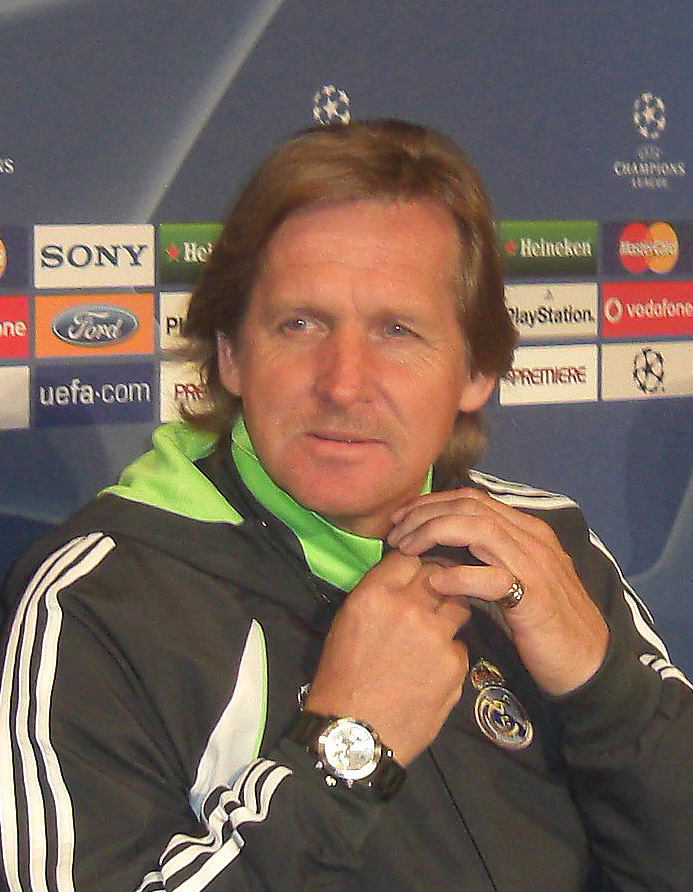
Bernd Schuster, champion in all three as player

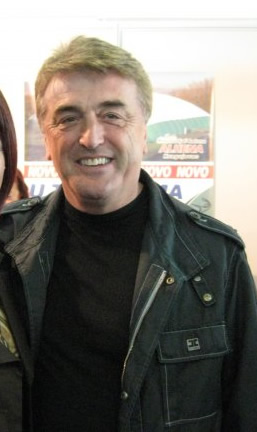
Radomir Antić, the only coach in all three

Ricardo Zamora had titles in both city of Barcelona clubs and both Madrid teams as well

=== Footballers ===
- (Spain) Luis Miranda: Real Madrid 1939, Barcelona 1939–1940, Atlético de Madrid 1941
- (Germany) Bernd Schuster: Barcelona 1980–1988, Real Madrid 1988–1990, Atlético de Madrid 1990–1993
- (Spain) Miquel Soler: Barcelona 1988–1991 and 1992–1993, Atlético de Madrid 1991–1992, Real Madrid 1995–1996

Soler curiously played for Espanyol, the other club from the city of Barcelona, before his career on the Big Three. Alfredo Di Stéfano also participated in matches by these four clubs, although he wore Barcelona and Atlético uniform only in friendlies.

Schuster later came back to Real Madrid as coach, on the years of 2007 and 2008.

=== Coaches ===
- (Serbia) Radomir Antić: Real Madrid 1991–1992, Atlético de Madrid 1995–1998, 1999 and 2000 and Barcelona 2003

Antić, as Real Madrid manager, could not prevent Barcelona's titles under Johan Cruijff. The Serb was particularly recognized at Atlético de Madrid, as the coach of the historic double at 1995–96 season, with titles in both La Liga and (by winning Barcelona in the final) Copa del Rey. Thus, he was urgently called upon in 2000 to try to avoid Atleti relegation, which proved impossible, although his team could reach the 2000 Copa del Rey final. In 2002, Antić then went to Barcelona, averting the threat of relegation seen in the beginning of 2002–03 season and promoting Andrés Iniesta's debut in the first team. That 1996 Spanish title was the only won by Atlético at First Division between the 1970s and the 2010s.

=== Miscellaneous ===
- (Spain) Josep Samitier: Barcelona player 1919–1932 and coach 1944–1947; Real Madrid player 1932–1934 and Atlético de Madrid coach 1936
- (Spain) Ricardo Zamora: Barcelona player 1919–1922; Real Madrid player 1930–1936; Atlético de Madrid coach 1939–40 and 1940–1946
- (Spain) Luis Aragonés: Real Madrid player 1958–1960; Atlético de Madrid player 1964–1974 and coach 1974–1978, 1979–1980, 1982–1987, 1991–1993 and 2001–2003; Barcelona coach 1987–1988

Zamora and Aragonés both had times also in Espanyol, also a club from the city of Barcelona. Zamora was the coach who won the first two titles of Atlético at La Liga.

== See also ==
- El Clásico
- Madrid derby
- El Otro Clásico
- Big Three (Belgium)
- Big Three (Costa Rica)
- Big Three (Greece)
- Big Three (Italy)
- Big Three (Netherlands)
- Big Three (Peru)
- Big Three (Portugal)
- Big Three (Sweden)
- Big Three (Turkey)
- Big Four (Mexico)
- Big Five (Argentina)
- Big Six (Premier League)
- Big Twelve (Brazil)
