= Big Four (Mexico) =

Group of four Mexican football clubs

- Location: Mexico City; Guadalajara; Toluca (contested)
- Teams: América; Guadalajara; Cruz Azul; Pumas UNAM (contested; other designations include Toluca)
- Stadiums: Estadio Azteca (América and Cruz Azul); Akron (Guadalajara); Olímpico Universitario (Pumas UNAM; contested); Estadio Nemesio Diez (Toluca; contested)

In Mexican football, the Big Four (Spanish: Los Cuatro Grandes) refers to a group of clubs traditionally considered the most successful and widely supported in the country. América, Guadalajara, Cruz Azul, and Pumas UNAM were historically assigned this designation, though the designation has been debated over the years given the rise of other successful teams in Mexico's Liga MX.

In the 2020s, Toluca surpassed Cruz Azul and Pumas UNAM in league titles and drawn level with Guadalajara, leading some to argue for Toluca's inclusion in the group, replacing Pumas UNAM, or the recognition of an expanded Big Five.

== Clubs ==
Location of the Big Four Liga MX football clubs
Greater Mexico City Liga MX football clubs

Mexico City is home to three members of the "Big Four"; América (16), Cruz Azul (10), and Pumas UNAM (7) have 33 Liga MX titles among them. Guadalajara (located in Zapopan), with 12 titles brings the total count of Liga MX titles amongst them to 45.

Club	Founded	City	Venue	Capacity
América	12 October 1916; 110 years ago	Mexico City	Estadio Azteca	87,523
Cruz Azul	22 May 1927; 99 years ago (Note: Controversy exists on the date of the founding of Cruz Azul. On 22 March 1927, workers from the company Cooperativa La Cruz Azul, together with Carlos Garcés, decided to form a football team. This founding date is kept in the institution's Hall of Fame, as well as in various official publications of the team. However, after playing several matches internally, on 22 May 1927, Cruz Azul played its first official match against Jilotepec. Because of this, the club has adopted this date as its founding date in recent years.)	Mexico City	Estadio Azteca	87,523
Guadalajara	8 May 1906; 120 years ago	Zapopan	Estadio Akron	48,071
Pumas UNAM	2 August 1954; 72 years ago	Mexico City	Estadio Olímpico Universitario	58,445

== Rivalries ==
=== El Súper Clásico ===
One of Guadalajara’s principal rivalries is with Mexico City-based América. Their matches are known as El Súper Clásico and are generally played at least twice during each league season. Guadalajara won their first meeting 3–0, while América won the second 7–2. The rivalry developed over subsequent decades and included confrontations between the teams in 1983 and 1986. FourFourTwo included the fixture in its list of the world’s 50 biggest derbies.[10]

=== Clásico Capitalino ===
The rivalry between América and Pumas UNAM is known as the "Clásico Capitalino" (Spanish for "Capital Classic"), due to the fact that both teams are based in Mexico City—the country's capital. The first match between the two clubs took place on 1 July 1962, where América hosted Pumas, who had recently been promoted from the second division. In Mexico the match is often perceived as the representation of a struggle between two antagonistic powers and institutions: América is regarded as the club representing the establishment and the wealthy. The fact that the club is owned by the mass media company Televisa has further intensified this image. Pumas representing the Universidad Nacional Autónoma de México, identifies itself as the club of the intellectuals and middle-class. The rivalry is particularly fierce from Pumas's side: according to surveys the majority of their supporters consider América as their main rival. However, America's fans see it as an important match but deem the match against Chivas as more important.

=== Clásico Joven ===
América's other capital-based rival, and the most important, is Cruz Azul, with whom they compete in the derby known as the "Clásico Joven" (Spanish for "Young Classic"). Although both teams reside in Mexico City, Cruz Azul was founded in Jasso, Hidalgo. In a similar perspective between América and Pumas's rivalry, the rivalry between América and Cruz Azul is also seen as based on social class differences: América representing the wealthy and powerful while Cruz Azul is said to represent the working class, hence fans of Cruz Azul and the team itself being dubiously referred to by the nickname of "Los Albañiles" (Spanish for bricklayers), a reference to Cruz Azul's eponymous parent company, which is one of Mexico's major companies specializing in concrete and construction.

=== Pumas UNAM vs. Guadalajara ===
In recent years, Pumas UNAM and Guadalajara have increased their rivalry. Most of it is due to the 2004 Final; Pumas vs. Guadalajara. Also, Pumas went 36 years without winning an away match against Guadalajara.

On 6 October 2018, Pumas faced Guadalajara away in Liga MX. They had won this fixture ten days earlier in the Copa MX Round of 16 by a score of 3–1, though many considered the winless streak still unbroken because it did not occur in Liga MX play. Guadalajara quickly took the lead, Isaác Brizuela opening the scoring. However Guadalajara had little time to celebrate, as Pumas tied the game shortly thereafter. The score remained 1–1 until the 66th minute, when Felipe Mora scored on a header to give Pumas the lead. Pumas then saw out the 2–1 win, officially ending the 36-year record of not winning against Guadalajara in an away match in the Liga MX.

== Honours ==
=== National ===
Liga MX
Club	Titles	Recent
América	16	Apertura 2024
Guadalajara	12	Clausura 2017
Cruz Azul	10	Clausura 2026
Pumas UNAM	7	Clausura 2011

Copa MX
Club	Titles	Recent
América	6	Clausura 2019
Guadalajara	4	Clausura 2017
Cruz Azul	4	Apertura 2018
Pumas UNAM	1	1974–75

Campeón de Campeones
Club	Titles	Recent
Guadalajara	7	1970
América	7	2024
Cruz Azul	4	2026
Pumas UNAM	2	2004

Supercopa de la Liga MX
Club	Titles	Recent
Cruz Azul	1	2022
América	1	2024
Guadalajara	—	—
Pumas UNAM	—	—

Supercopa MX
Club	Titles	Recent
Guadalajara	1	2016
Cruz Azul	1	2019
América	—	—
Pumas UNAM	—	—

=== Continental ===
CONCACAF Champions Cup/League
Club	Titles	Recent
Cruz Azul	7	2025
América	7	2015–16
Pumas UNAM	3	1989
Guadalajara	2	2018

CONCACAF Giants Cup
Club	Titles	Recent
América	1	2001
Cruz Azul	—	—
Guadalajara	—	—
Pumas UNAM	—	—

=== International ===
Copa Interamericana
Club	Titles	Recent
América	2	1990
Pumas UNAM	1	1981
Cruz Azul	—	—
Guadalajara	—	—

== Finals against each other ==
Key
*	Match was won on a penalty shoot-out
&	Match was won after a replay

- The "Year" or "Season" column refers to the season or year the competition was held, and links to the article about that match.
- The two-legged finals are listed in the order they were played.

Liga MX ^{†}	Copa MX ^{^}	Campeón de Campeones ^{‡}

List of finals between the Big Four
Season/Year	Winners	Score	Runners-up	City	Attendance	Ref.
1953–54^{^}	América	1–1* (Note: Score was 1–1 after 110 minutes. América won the penalty shoot-out 3–1.)	Guadalajara	Mexico City	30,000	
1954–55^{^}	América	1–0	Guadalajara	Mexico City	36,000	
1964^{‡}	Guadalajara	2–0	América	Mexico City	70,000	
1965^{‡}	Guadalajara	2–1	América	Mexico City	70,000	
1971–72^{†}	Cruz Azul	4–1	América	Mexico City	100,000	
1973–74^{^}	América	1–1	Cruz Azul	Mexico City		
1973–74^{^}	América	2–1	Cruz Azul	Mexico City	75,000	
1973–74^{^}	América won 3–2 on aggregate.					
1974^{‡}	Cruz Azul	2–1	América	Mexico City	110,000	
1978–79^{†}	Cruz Azul	0–0	Pumas UNAM	Mexico City		
1978–79^{†}	Cruz Azul	2–0	Pumas UNAM	Mexico City		
1978–79^{†}	Cruz Azul won 2–0 on aggregate.					
1980–81^{†}	Pumas UNAM	0–1	Cruz Azul	Mexico City		
1980–81^{†}	Pumas UNAM	4–1	Cruz Azul	Mexico City		
1980–81^{†}	Pumas UNAM won 4–2 on aggregate.					
1983–84^{†}	América	2–2	Guadalajara	Guadalajara	56,713	
1983–84^{†}	América	3–1	Guadalajara	Mexico City	110,000	
1983–84^{†}	América won 5–3 on aggregate.					
1984–85^{†}	América	1–1	Pumas UNAM	Mexico City		
1984–85^{†}	América	0–0	Pumas UNAM	Mexico City		
1984–85^{†}	América	3–1^{&}	Pumas UNAM	Querétaro City		
1984–85^{†}	América won 4–2 on aggregate.					
1986–87^{†}	Guadalajara	1–2	Cruz Azul	Mexico City	100,000	
1986–87^{†}	Guadalajara	3–0	Cruz Azul	Guadalajara	56,713	
1986–87^{†}	Guadalajara won 4–2 on aggregate.					
1987–88^{†}	América	0–1	Pumas UNAM	Mexico City		
1987–88^{†}	América	4–1	Pumas UNAM	Mexico City		
1987–88^{†}	América won 4–2 on aggregate.					
1988–89^{†}	América	2–3	Cruz Azul	Mexico City		
1988–89^{†}	América	2–2	Cruz Azul	Mexico City		
1988–89^{†}	América won 5–4 on aggregate.					
1990–91^{†}	Pumas UNAM	2–3	América	Mexico City		
1990–91^{†}	Pumas UNAM	1–0	América	Mexico City		
1990–91^{†}	3–3 on aggregate; Pumas UNAM won on the away goals rule.					
Clausura 2004^{†}	Pumas UNAM	1–1	Guadalajara	Guadalajara		
Clausura 2004^{†}	Pumas UNAM	0–0*	Guadalajara	Mexico City		
Clausura 2004^{†}	1–1 on aggregate; Pumas won 5–4 on penalty kicks.					
2005^{‡}	América	0–0	Pumas UNAM	Mexico City	55,000	
2005^{‡}	América	2–1	Pumas UNAM	Mexico City	60,000	
2005^{‡}	América won 2–1 on aggregate.					
Clausura 2013^{†}	América	0–1	Cruz Azul	Mexico City	30,203	
Clausura 2013^{†}	América	2–1*	Cruz Azul	Mexico City	85,170	
Clausura 2013^{†}	2–2 on aggregate; América won 4–2 on penalty kicks.					
Apertura 2018^{†}	América	0–0	Cruz Azul	Mexico City	59,244	
Apertura 2018^{†}	América	2–0	Cruz Azul	Mexico City	71,240	
Apertura 2018^{†}	América won 2–0 on aggregate.					
Clausura 2024^{†}	América	1–1	Cruz Azul	Mexico City	27,224	
Clausura 2024^{†}	América	1–0	Cruz Azul	Mexico City	73,604	
Clausura 2024^{†}	América won 2–1 on aggregate.					
Clausura 2026^{†}	Cruz Azul	0–0	Pumas UNAM	Mexico City	27,500	
Clausura 2026^{†}	Cruz Azul	2–1	Pumas UNAM	Mexico City	48,445	
Clausura 2026^{†}	Cruz Azul won 2–1 on aggregate.					

== See also ==
- Football in Mexico
- Big Three (Belgium)
- Big Three (Costa Rica)
- Big Three (Greece)
- Big Three (Italy)
- Big Three (Netherlands)
- Big Three (Peru)
- Big Three (Portugal)
- Big Three (Spain)
- Big Three (Sweden)
- Big Three (Turkey)
- Big Five (Argentina)
- Big Six (Premier League)
- Big Twelve (Brazil)
