= Big Six (Premier League) =

Group of English football clubs

Location of the Big Six in England

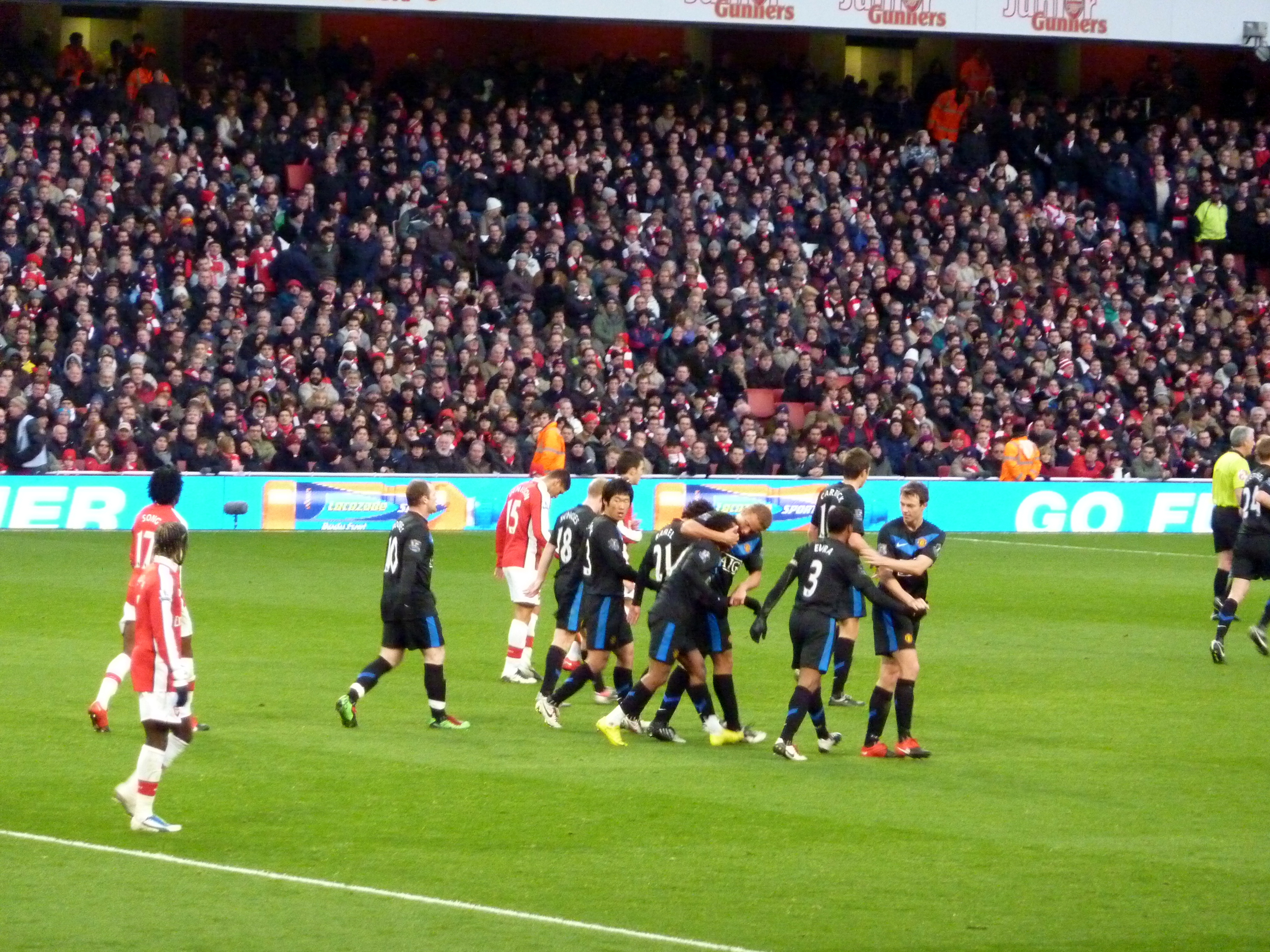
Big Two from the 1990s – Arsenal and Manchester United

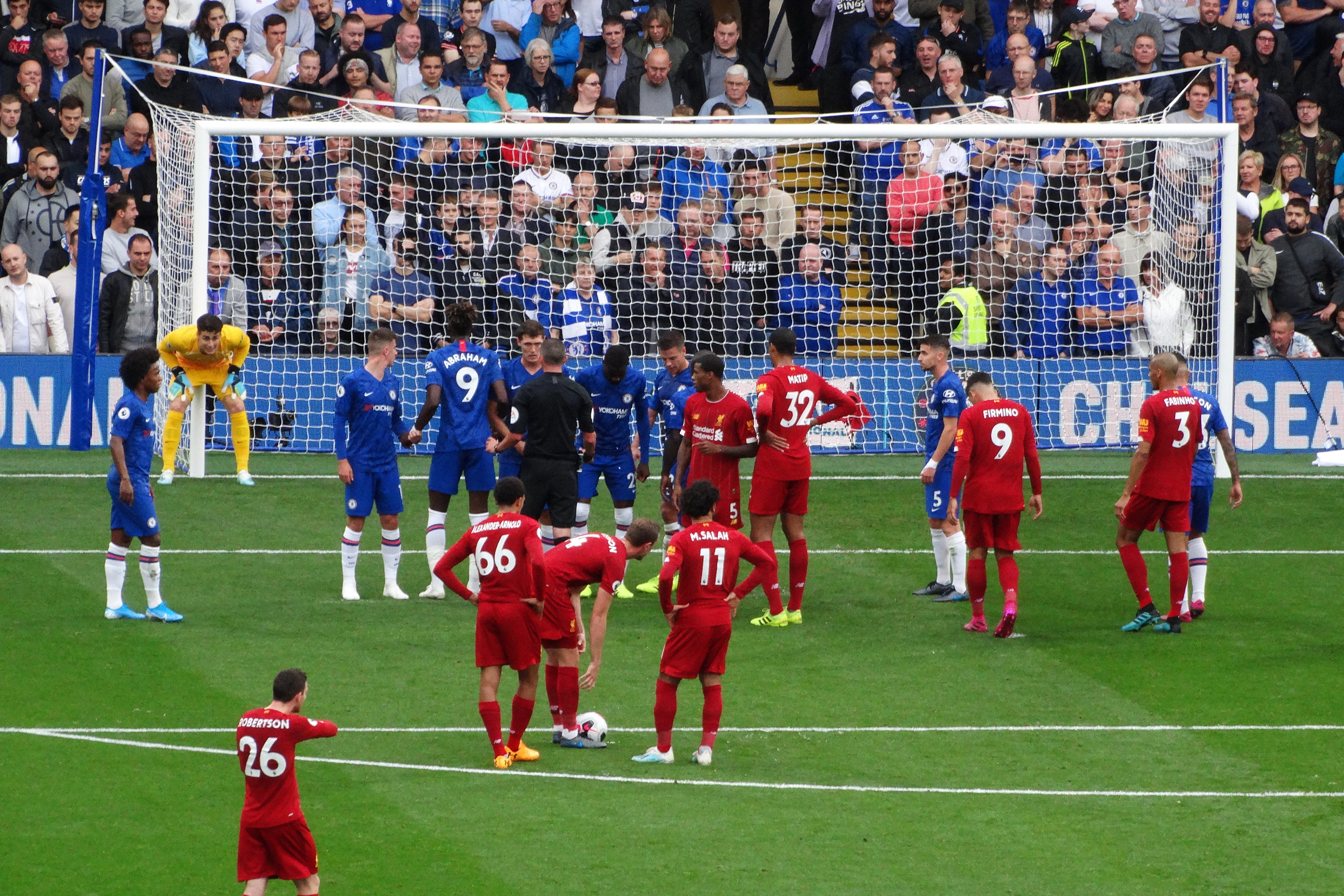
Expansion with Chelsea and Liverpool to make the Big Four

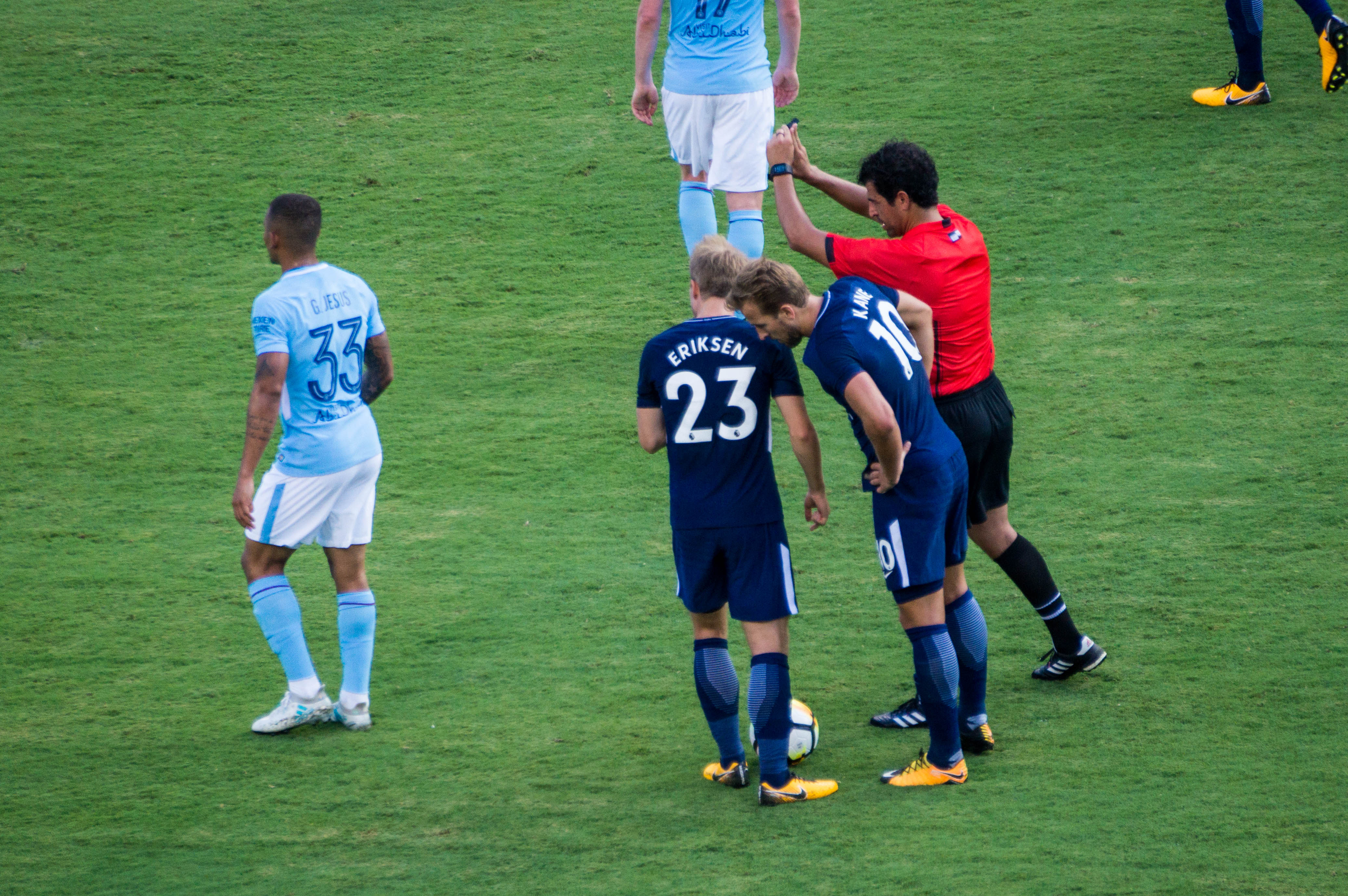
Additions of Manchester City and Tottenham Hotspur to form the Big Six

The Big Six is an informal term used to describe a group of six clubs in the Premier League: Arsenal, Chelsea, Liverpool, Manchester City, Manchester United, and Tottenham Hotspur. These are the six clubs with the largest fan base sizes. They are also often recognised for their sustained success and financial strength in the competition. While not an official designation, clubs in this group have typically accounted for at least half of the total annual revenue generated by Premier League clubs since 2004.

The concept first emerged in the 1980s as the Big Five, comprising Arsenal, Everton, Liverpool, Manchester United, and Tottenham Hotspur. These clubs had the largest fan bases and associated financial power. They dominated TV coverage between around 1985 and 1991. In the late 1990s and early 2000s, a duopoly formed between Manchester United and Arsenal due to their dominance in league titles. This Big Two was the dominant force of English football between 1997 and 2003. The term Big Four gained prominence in the mid 2000s when Chelsea and Liverpool consistently finished in the league's top four, with the clubs dominating between 2004 and 2009. By the early 2010s, Manchester City and Tottenham Hotspur were regularly competing at the top end of the table, leading to the informal expansion into the Big Six. The Big Six would dominate the Premier League from 2010 to 2022. As of 2026, the Premier League title was won by a Big Six club in every season since its foundation except in the 1994–95 and 2015–16 seasons which were won by Blackburn Rovers and Leicester City respectively. Of the Big Six, only Tottenham Hotspur have never won a Premier League title since its foundation.

Since around 2023, the concept of the Big Six has been called into question. This discussion has been driven by the improved performances of teams outside of the Big Six, such as Newcastle United and Aston Villa, and by the poor form of Big Six clubs, particularly Tottenham Hotspur and Manchester United. However, there is no widespread consensus on what form a replacement for the Big Six would take, and the Big Six continue to feature as a concept across a broad range of sporting publications.

== History ==
Finishing places of the Big Six in the Premier League since 2009
Season	ARS	CHE	LIV	MCI	MUN	TOT
2009–10	3	1	7	5	2	4
2010–11	4	2	6	3	1	5
2011–12	3	6	8	1	2	4
2012–13	4	3	7	2	1	5
2013–14	4	3	2	1	7	6
2014–15	3	1	6	2	4	5
2015–16	2	10	8	4	5	3
2016–17	5	1	4	3	6	2
2017–18	6	5	4	1	2	3
2018–19	5	3	2	1	6	4
2019–20	8	4	1	2	3	6
2020–21	8	4	3	1	2	7
2021–22	5	3	2	1	6	4
2022–23	2	12	5	1	3	8
2023–24	2	6	3	1	8	5
2024–25	2	4	1	3	15	17
2025–26	1	10	5	2	3	17
League champions Champions League; Europa League; Conference League

=== Origins ===
Before the 1980s the elite of English football would regularly fluctuate. Despite this, teams could go through lengthy periods of success, such as Huddersfield Town winning the First Division three times in a row between 1924 and 1926 and Nottingham Forest winning the European Cup consecutively in both 1979 and 1980. However, it was much rarer for teams to dominate the top positions over lengthy periods. For example, in the 1960s, there were seven different First Division winners, compared with four in the 1980s and three in the 2000s.

=== Big Five ===
In the 1980s, a Big Five—consisting of Liverpool, Manchester United, Arsenal, Everton and Tottenham Hotspur—emerged. The clubs dominated major competitions in the 1980s. Three of the clubs (Arsenal, Everton and Liverpool) dominated the First Division title during this period, with no club other than those three winning the First Division between 1982 and 1991. Between 1982 and 1988, Everton and Liverpool won every First Division title, in a period known as the Merseyside Monopoly. In October 1990, representatives of the Big Five met with media executive Greg Dyke to discuss the foundation of the Premier League, leading to its establishment in 1992.

=== Big Two ===
Manchester United finished first in five of the first seven seasons, and second in the other two. Following the appointment of Arsène Wenger as its head coach in 1996, Arsenal began to engage in higher levels of competitiveness with Manchester United, with the two clubs dominating the Premier League's top-two positions between 1998 and 2003. As a result, they were recognized as the Big Two of the Premier League by mainstream media. Manchester United won five league titles (1999–2000, 2000–01, 2002–03, 2006–07, 2007–08), while Arsenal secured two (2001–02, 2003–04). Arsenal's unbeaten 2003–04 season led to the nickname "The Invincibles," the only team to achieve this in the Premier League era.

=== Big Four ===
Liverpool began to challenge the Big Two from 2001, due to their treble win of the UEFA Cup, Football League Cup and FA Cup, along with its striker Michael Owen winning the Ballon d'Or the same year, in addition to the club finishing in the top six of the Premier League in the early 2000s consistently. However, the Big Two continued to dominate in the Premier League. The following year, Liverpool finished second, becoming the first club outside the Big Two since Newcastle United in 1997 to finish in the top two of the Premier League, though the Big Two would dominate the top two places once more the following season.

In 2003, Chelsea was bought by Russian businessman Roman Abramovich, something which guided the club to improved performances and higher recognition. That, alongside Liverpool's increasing success, eventually formed a Big Four with Arsenal and Manchester United. Between 2004 and 2009, the Big Four dominated the top four of the Premier League, with Everton in 2005 being the only occurrence of a club outside the Big Four finishing in the top four during that time. From 2005 to 2012, the Big Four clubs appeared in seven of eight Champions League finals, with Liverpool, Manchester United, and Chelsea each winning one title, while Arsenal finished as runners-up in 2006.

=== Big Six ===
Following an acquisition by Abu Dhabi United Group and subsequent increase in spending funds, Manchester City started to purchase elite players and qualified for the UEFA Champions League in 2011, for the first time in its history as well as winning the Premier League title in the 2011–12 season. Tottenham Hotspur, under the management of Harry Redknapp from 2009 to 2012, finished in 4th and 5th place consistently, leading to its addition to the Big Four with Manchester City to form the Big Six. The 2010–11 season of the Premier League was the first time in the competition's history all six clubs finished in the top six.

The Big Six dominated the finishing places of the top four in the Premier League between 2010 and 2022, with the 2015–16 season being the only one with a top-four finish by a club outside the Big Six, as it ended with Leicester City becoming the champions for first time. In seasons between 2010 and 2024, there were twelve occurrences of a Big Six club not finishing in the top six, and between 2019 and 2024, there was one season in which the Big Six clubs finished in the top six of the league, shifting from the 2016–17 to 2019–20 seasons, when the Big Six occupied all top-six places.

In 2022 and 2023, the Big Six clubs each generated an annual revenue between £372 million to £713 million. In 2021, the Big Six clubs' average spending on transfers was £50.9 million, more than twice the amount spent by any other club in the league. The Herald described them as clubs with "the biggest bank balances and the biggest fanbases".

==== Project Big Picture and European Super League ====
In October 2020, two Big Six clubs, Liverpool and Manchester United, put together a plan called Project Big Picture, which would have seen teams in the English Football League given £250m to share between themselves, plus 25% of revenue from future TV deals that the Premier League secures. The number of Premier League teams would be reduced from 20 to 18 and the EFL Cup and Community Shield would be abolished. The Big Six and three other clubs (Everton, West Ham United and Southampton) would also be given special voting rights on certain issues. The idea was rejected by Premier League clubs.

In 2021, the European Super League (ESL), a competition created with the purpose of replacing the UEFA Champions League, was founded, consisting of the Big Six and six other clubs from Europe's Big Five leagues. After receiving backlash from the UK government, the Football Association and the Premier League, the Big Six clubs withdrew their memberships from the ESL and were fined a total of £22 million by the latter two organizations, in addition to being subjected to potential penalties including a 30-point deduction and a fine of £25 million should they attempt to join a similar league in future. An independent fan-led regulatory body was subsequently formed by the government, tasking Premier League clubs with handling a substantial portion of its funding.

=== Alternative definitions ===
Throughout the history of the Big Six and predecessors, its future has been speculated and alternative groups have been suggested. In 2010, as the league was becoming more competitive, and the title was widely seen as a battle between Manchester United and Chelsea, BBC Sport began to speculate whether the Big Four had become a Big Two consisting of Manchester United and Chelsea. However, this failed to gain widespread traction. In March 2016, five Premier League clubs (Arsenal, Chelsea, Liverpool, Manchester City and Manchester United) reportedly had a secret meeting to discuss a future “Super European” league, though it was denied by those clubs. This led to them briefly being referred to as the Big Five by the media. In 2017, talk began to emerge over whether Everton would form a Big Seven, following a season where they dominated the league table along with the Big Six. However, following a poor start to the following season, speculation ended. Around early 2021, there was also discussions about Leicester City potentially forming a Big Seven due to their increased competitiveness at the time.

Since around 2023, there have been more wider discussions about a potential successor to the Big Six. One successor that has been discussed is a Big Seven featuring the Big Six and Newcastle United, something which gained traction in early 2023 following the club's takeover by Saudi Arabia's public investment fund in October 2021. In July 2024, Sky Sports began referring to the Big Seven rather than the Big Six. A May 2023 article by Jordan Campbell in The Athletic referred to the "Big Eight" as Aston Villa, Brighton & Hove Albion, Newcastle United, and every Big Six club except Chelsea. However, the term re-emerged in April 2024 consisting of Chelsea rather than Brighton. In May 2025, an article was published on the Premier League website stating that the "strength of mid-tier clubs marks the end of the Big Six era". In that same article, it also suggested that it is "reasonable now to talk about a Big Eight", before adding that "Brighton & Hove Albion might even challenge that".

Following two consecutive seasons where they finished one spot outside the relegation spots in 17th, debate began to emerge on whether Tottenham Hotspur in particular could be considered a "Big Six" club any longer; in February 2026, with the team sitting four points above the relegation zone, Wayne Rooney opined on his BBC Sounds show that the club were not "good enough to compete at the top end of the Premier League", while the team's former manager Ange Postecoglou claimed the team were "not a big club". BBC Sport raised the question of whether Aston Villa, with three consecutive top-six finishes, or Newcastle United with two since 2020, could be a replacement for the team in the Big Six. In March 2026, SportsView through OneFootball suggested that Aston Villa had taken Tottenham Hotspur's place in the Big Six "after outperforming them in recent seasons". A post-season analysis by Planet Football suggested that the concept of the big six "just about limp[ed] on" as Tottenham avoided relegation, but commented if "the likes of Aston Villa keep qualifying for the Champions League", the term may have to be retired.

== Rivalries ==
Multiple rivalries exist among the Big Six clubs. Arsenal has London-based rivalries with Chelsea and Tottenham Hotspur, and league-based rivalries with Manchester City and Manchester United, while the club's relationship with Liverpool was noted as "friendly and sporting" by The Guardian. The rivalries of Chelsea, in addition to Arsenal include Liverpool, Manchester United and Tottenham, while Liverpool's rivalries encompass Manchester City and Manchester United, both of which share an intracity rivalry, contested in the Manchester derby. Chelsea's rivalry with Manchester City emerged from the clubs' successes in the UEFA Champions League in the early 2020s.

== Players ==
From 2015 to 2019, a significant increase in incoming transfers by the Big Six for players from foreign clubs occurred, whereas less than 15% of players signed during the period were from other Premier League clubs. In the 2020s, the percentage of players signed by the Big Six from other Premier League clubs increased substantially, with the 2025 summer transfer window seeing the highest percentage since 2010 at 27%.

Eight players have played for three or more Big Six clubs. Nicolas Anelka and Raheem Sterling are the only players to have played for four, both representing Arsenal, Chelsea, Liverpool and Manchester City, while Kolo Touré, William Gallas, Yossi Benayoun, Emmanuel Adebayor, Daniel Sturridge and Danny Welbeck each played for three. Since the foundation of the Premier League until August 2022, there were 77 player transfers between two Big Six clubs.

List of footballers of three or more Big Six clubs
Player	Clubs					
Player	ARS	CHE	LIV	MCI	MUN	TOT
Emmanuel Adebayor	2006–2009	–	–	2009–2012	–	2012–2015
Nicolas Anelka	1997–1999	2008–2012	2001–2002	2002–2005	–	–
Yossi Benayoun	2011–2012	2010–2013	2007–2010	–	–	–
William Gallas	2006–2010	2001–2006	–	–	–	2010–2013
Raheem Sterling	2024–2025	2022–2026	2012–2015	2015–2022	–	–
Daniel Sturridge	–	2009–2013	2013–2019	2006–2009	–	–
Kolo Touré	2002–2009	–	2013–2016	2009–2013	–	–
Danny Welbeck	2014–2019	2026–	–	–	2008–2014	–

== Big Six teams and honours ==
As of 16 August 2026

Each club has won the Premier League or First Division at least once, with Arsenal, Liverpool, Manchester City and Manchester United winning it ten or more times. Arsenal and Manchester United have won the FA Cup more than ten times, while Liverpool has won the UEFA Champions League/European Cup and the UEFA Europa League/UEFA Cup titles the most among the Big Six. The FA Community Shield has been won by Manchester United on twenty or more occasions.

Premier League's Big Six
Club	Stadium	Capacity	City	Manager	Honours										
Club	Stadium	Capacity	City	Manager	L1	FA	LC	CS	UCL	UEL	UECL	UCW	USC	WC	Total
Arsenal	Emirates Stadium	60,704	London	Mikel Arteta	14	14	2	18	0	0	0	1	0	0	49
Chelsea	Stamford Bridge	40,044	London	Xabi Alonso	6	8	5	4	2	2	1	2	2	2	34
Liverpool	Anfield	61,276	Liverpool	Andoni Iraola	20	8	10	16	6	3	0	0	4	1	68
Manchester City	Etihad Stadium	61,038	Manchester	Enzo Maresca	10	8	9	7	1	0	0	1	1	1	38
Manchester United	Old Trafford	74,158	Manchester	Mauricio Pochettino	20	13	6	21	3	1	0	1	1	2	68
Tottenham Hotspur	Tottenham Hotspur Stadium	62,850	London	Roberto De Zerbi	2	8	4	7	0	3	0	1	0	0	25

== See also ==
- Bank of England club
- Big Three (Belgium)
- Big Three (Costa Rica)
- Big Three (Greece)
- Big Three (Italy)
- Big Three (Netherlands)
- Big Three (Peru)
- Big Three (Portugal)
- Big Three (Spain)
- Big Three (Sweden)
- Big Three (Turkey)
- Big Four (Mexico)
- Big Five (Argentina)
- Big Twelve (Brazil)
