= Big Three (Netherlands) =

Three most successful Dutch football teams

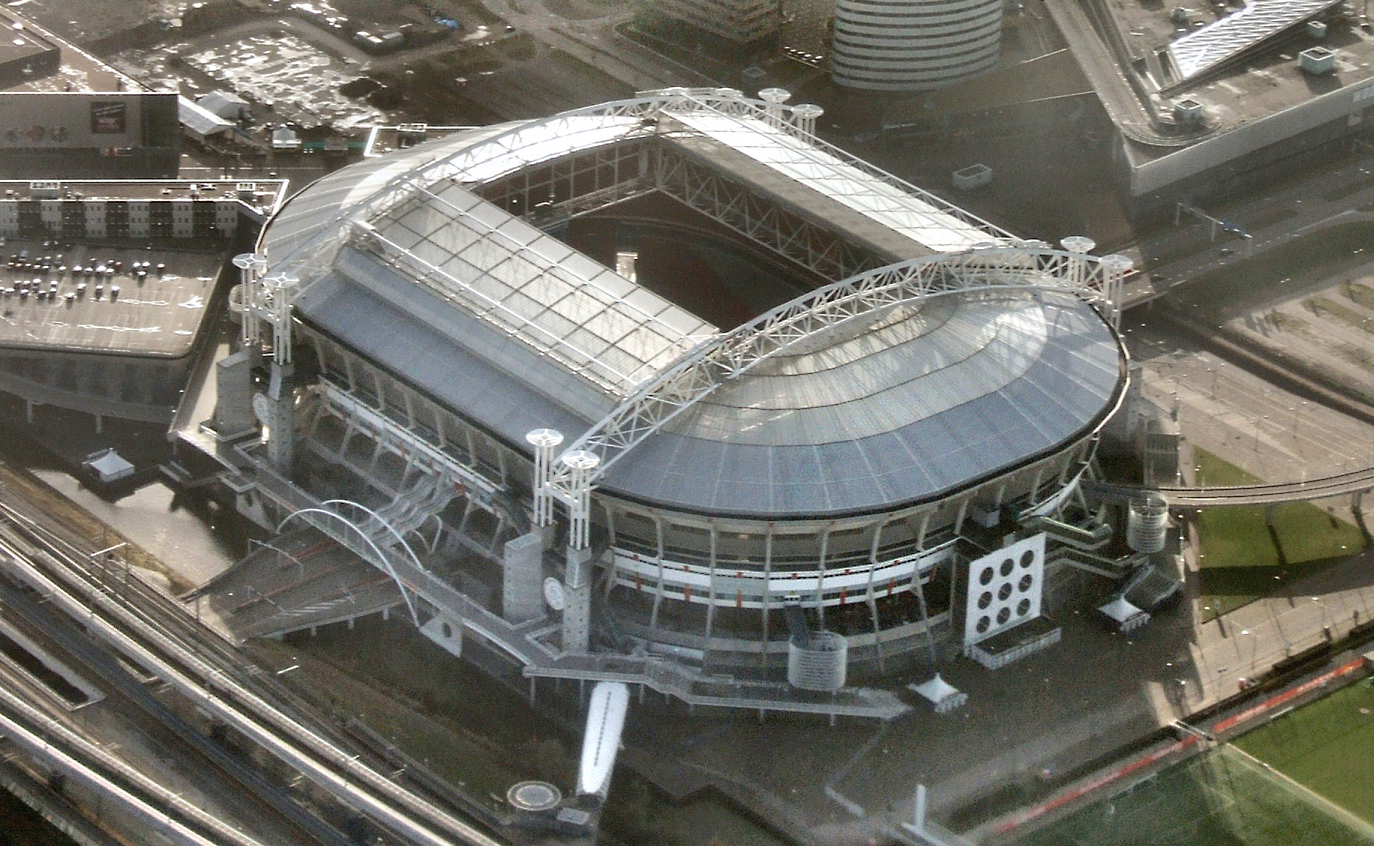
Ajax, Johan Cruyff Arena

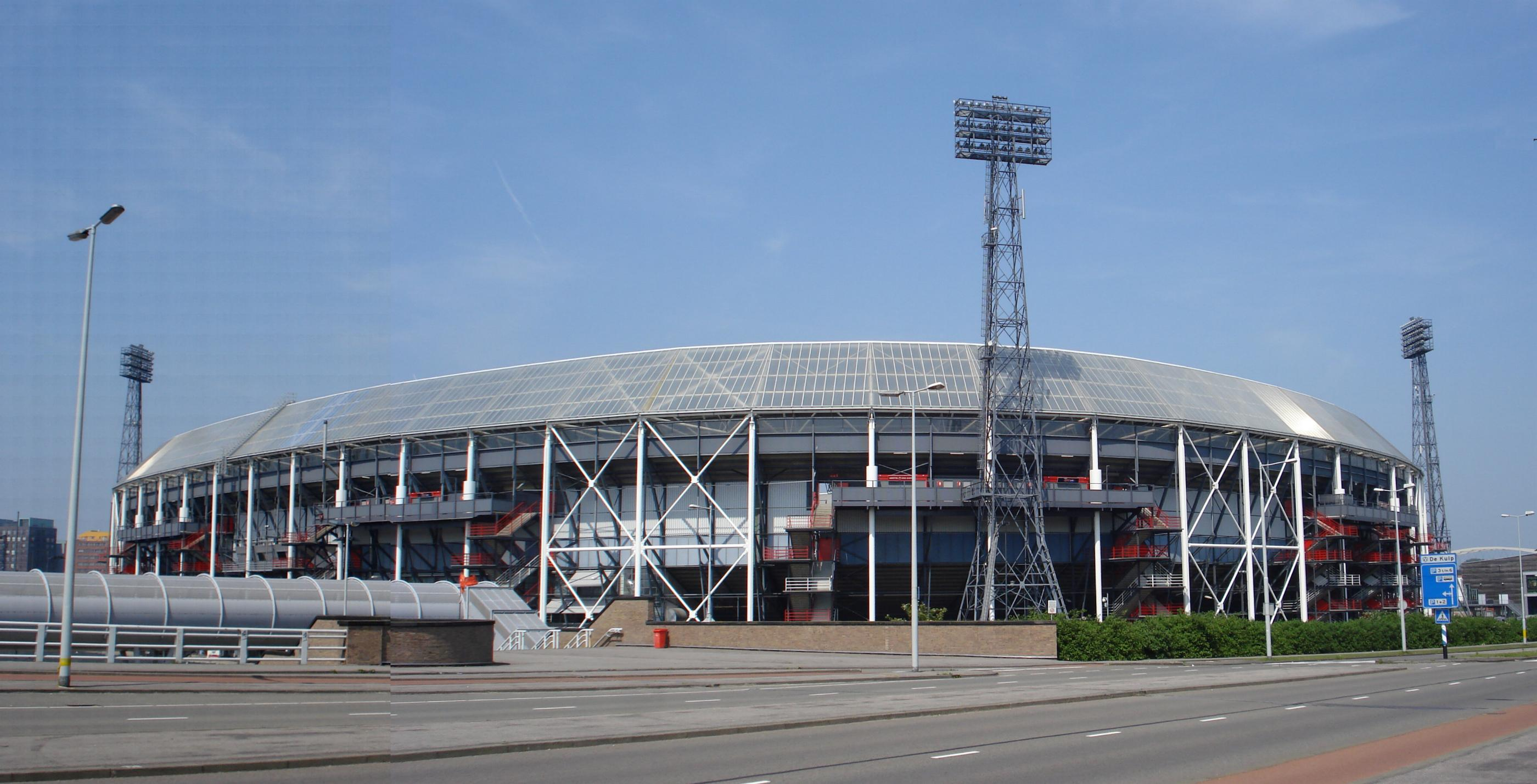
Feyenoord, De Kuip

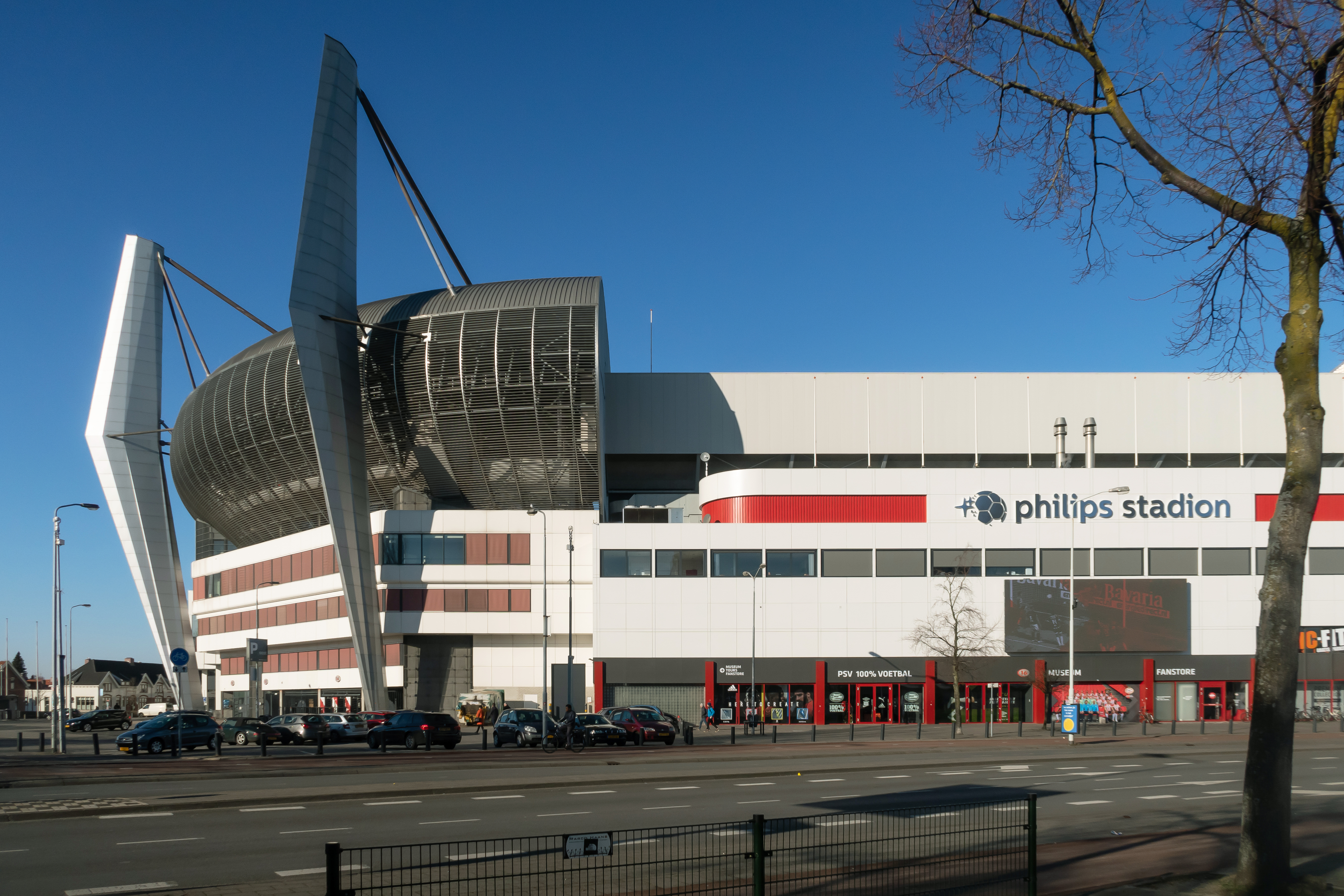
PSV, Philips Stadion

In Dutch sports, The Big Three (Dutch: De Grote Drie) (or The (Traditional) Top Three (Dutch: De (Traditionele) Topdrie)) or The Three Top Clubs (Dutch: De drie Topclubs)) are the nicknames for the three most successful rivalling football clubs in the Netherlands: Ajax from Amsterdam, Feyenoord from Rotterdam and PSV from Eindhoven. Collectively they amounted to 79 of the 136 Dutch Football Championships ever played (as of 2026), and 63 of a possible 69 championships since the introduction of the national Eredivisie in 1956 (as of 2026). The three clubs generally end up sharing the top three positions and contending for the title.

None of the three clubs have been relegated from the Eredivisie either, having been participants in all editions since Dutch football was merged into a single top-level professional competition in the 1956–57 season. The only other team not having relegated from the Eredivisie is FC Utrecht, which inherited the place from DOS in the highest Dutch league after the merger of DOS, Velox, and USV Elinkwijk per July 1970.

Location of the three clubs in the Netherlands

== Champions outside Big Three ==
Several other clubs outside the "Big Three" have won the Dutch league, with HVV Den Haag having the fourth most national titles behind the "Big Three" in the Netherlands with 10 in total; however, the last time they clinched the national title was in 1914.

After the Eredivisie was established in 1956, the only other champions, outside the “Big Three” clubs, were AZ Alkmaar (twice: 1981 and 2009), DOS (1958), Sparta Rotterdam (1959), DWS (1964) and FC Twente (2010).

== International successes ==
Ajax, Feyenoord, and PSV are the only Dutch clubs which have won European and international competitions.

Feyenoord won the European Cup in 1970, the UEFA Cup in 1974 and 2002, as well as the Intercontinental Cup in 1970. The club lost the match for the 2002 UEFA Super Cup and the final of the 2022 UEFA Europa Conference League.

Ajax won the European Cup three consecutive times in 1971, 1972 and 1973, and a fourth time after it was rebranded to the UEFA Champions League in 1995. Ajax also won the UEFA Cup in 1992, the UEFA Cup Winners' Cup in 1987, the Intercontinental Cup of 1972 and 1995, as well as the European Super Cup of 1972 (considered unofficial by UEFA), 1973 and 1995. The club lost the European Cup final in 1969, the UEFA Cup Winners' Cup final in 1988, the 1987 UEFA Super Cup, and the UEFA Europa League final in 2017.

PSV won the European Cup of 1988 and the UEFA Cup in 1978. The club lost the matches for the 1988 Intercontinental Cup and the 1988 UEFA Super Cup.

Besides the “Big Three”, FC Twente and AZ Alkmaar also played in UEFA Cup finals, in 1975 and 1981. They were both runners-up to Borussia Mönchengladbach and Ipswich Town, respectively.

== Trophies ==
Competition	Winners			Total	Runners-up			Total
Competition	Ajax	PSV	Feyenoord	Total	Ajax	PSV	Feyenoord	Total
Eredivisie	36	27	16	79	24	16	22	62
KNVB Cup	20	11	14	45	8	8	4	20
Johan Cruyff Shield (Dutch Super Cup)	9	15	5	29	10	9	7	26
National total	65	53	35	153	42	33	33	108
European Cup/UEFA Champions League	4	1	1	6	2	–	–	2
European Cup Winners' Cup	1	–	–	1	1	–	–	1
UEFA Cup/UEFA Europa League	1	1	2	4	1	–	–	1
UEFA Conference League	–	–	–	0	–	–	1	1
UEFA Super Cup	2 (Note: Ajax also won the 1972 European Super Cup, but is considered unofficial by UEFA; hence, only the 1973 and 1995 cups are included)	–	–	2	1	1	1	3
Intercontinental Cup	2	–	1	3	–	1	–	1
International total	10	2	4	16	5	2	2	9
Grand total	75	55	39	169	47	35	35	117

Last updated following the 2025–26 Eredivisie.

== Footballers who have played for all three clubs ==
Name	Position	Ajax	Feyenoord	PSV
(Netherlands) Ruud Geels	Forward	1974–1978	1966–1970	1981–1982
(Netherlands) Ronald Koeman	Defender	1983–1986	1995–1997	1986–1989

== Managers who have managed all three clubs ==
Name	Position	Ajax	Feyenoord	PSV
(Netherlands) Hans Kraay Sr.	Manager	1974–1975	1982–1983	1986–1987
(Netherlands) Ronald Koeman	Manager	2001–2005	2011–2014	2006–2007

== Miscellaneous ==
Name	Role	Ajax	Feyenoord	PSV
(Netherlands) Arie Haan	Player	1967–75	—	1983–84
(Netherlands) Arie Haan	Manager	—	1995–97	—
(Netherlands) Jaap Stam	Player	2006–07	—	1996–98
(Netherlands) Jaap Stam	Manager	—	2019	—
(Netherlands) Peter Bosz	Player	—	1990–96	—
(Netherlands) Peter Bosz	Manager	2016–17	—	2023–present
(Netherlands) Peter Bosz	Director	—	2006–09	—
(Denmark) Frank Arnesen	Player	1975–81	—	1985–88
(Denmark) Frank Arnesen	Assistant manager / director	—	—	1991–2004
(Denmark) Frank Arnesen	Director	—	2020–2022	—
(Netherlands) Jan Wouters	Player	1986–91	—	1994–96
(Netherlands) Jan Wouters	Manager	1999–2000	—	—
(Netherlands) Jan Wouters	Assistant manager	—	2015–18	2006–09

== See also ==
- De Klassieker
- AFC Ajax-PSV Eindhoven rivalry
- Big Three (Belgium)
- Big Three (Costa Rica)
- Big Three (Greece)
- Big Three (Italy)
- Big Three (Peru)
- Big Three (Portugal)
- Big Three (Spain)
- Big Three (Sweden)
- Big Three (Turkey)
- Big Four (Mexico)
- Big Five (Argentina)
- Big Six (Premier League)
- Big Twelve (Brazil)
