= Big Three (Italy) =

Nickname of the three most successful and biggest football clubs in Italy

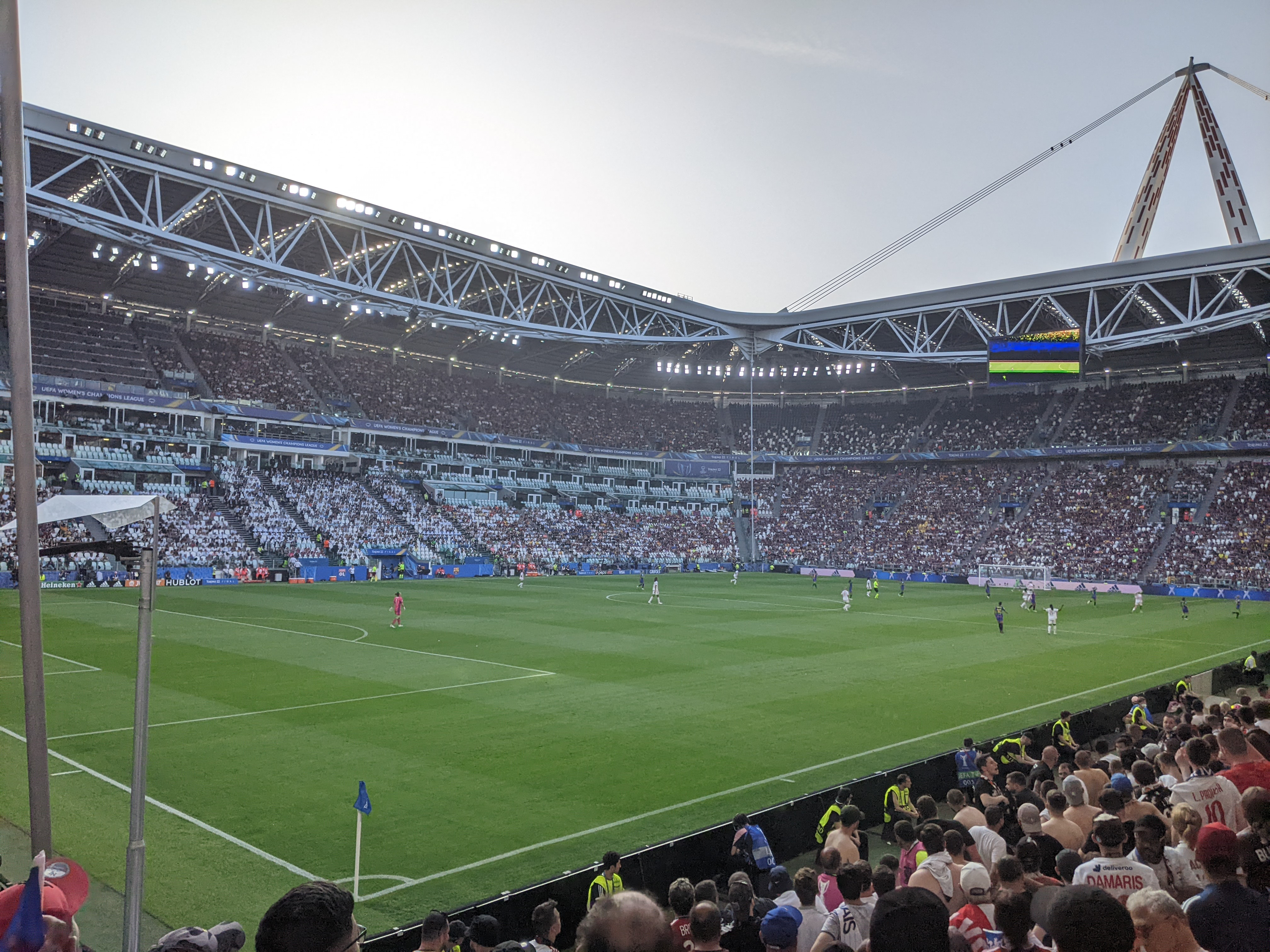
Juventus Stadium

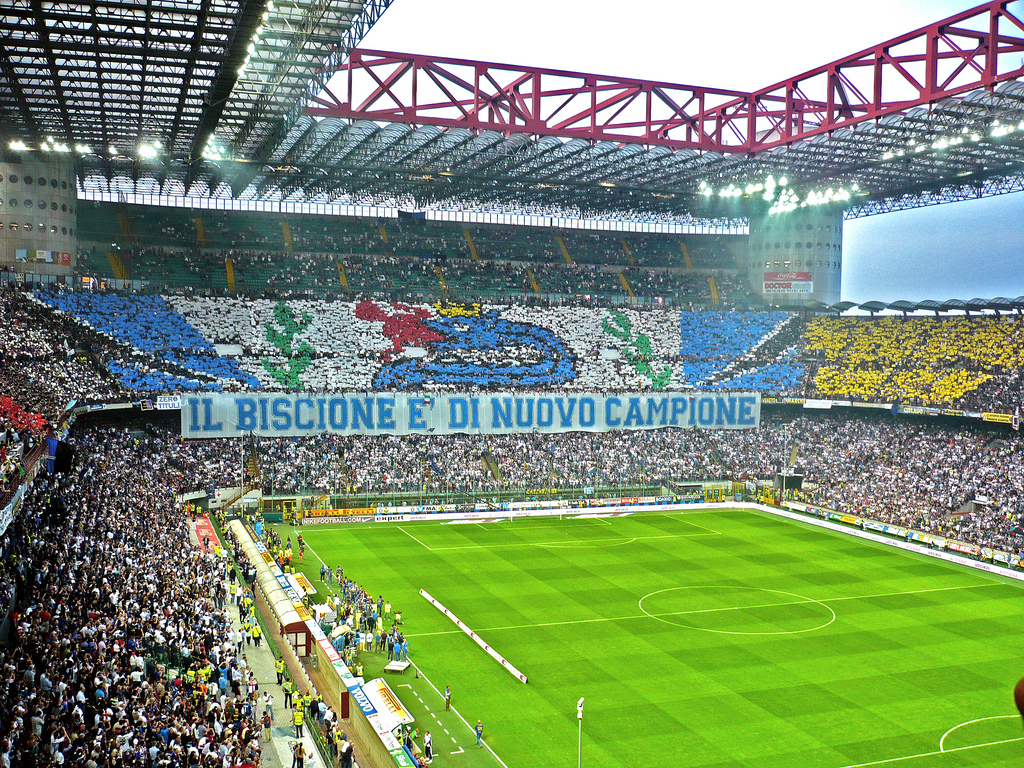
Internazionale fans at San Siro

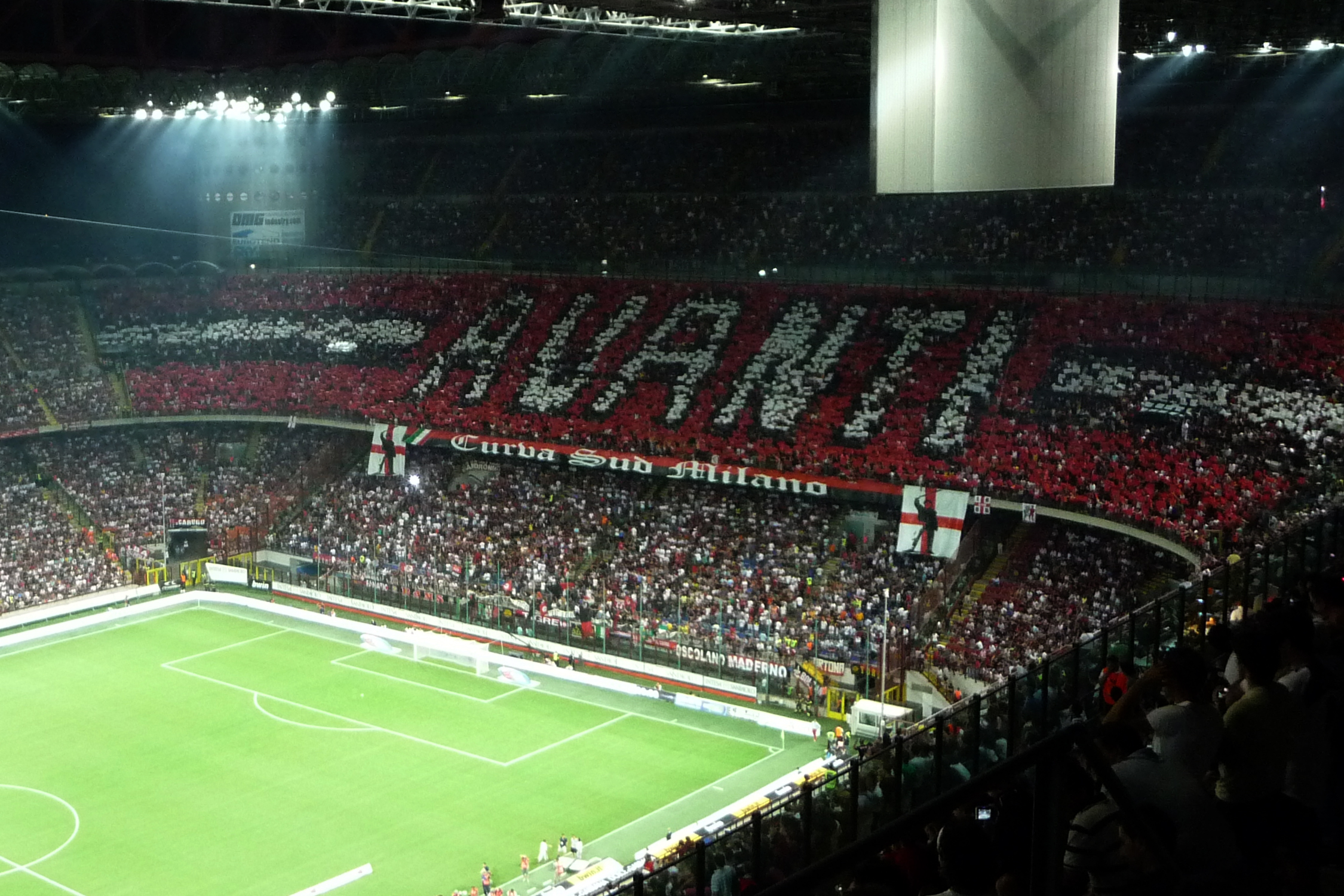
Milan fans at San Siro

The Big Three (Italian: Le Tre Grandi) is the nickname of the three most successful and biggest football clubs in Italy.

Juventus, Internazionale and Milan are, in that order, the three greatest Serie A winners, winning most of its seasons especially since the 1950s. They are indeed the three only clubs in having a star over his badges, with each star meaning ten titles at Italian First Division. For the period of 77 years between 1949 and 2026, won all but fifteen seasons on it, with each decade having no more than three seasons (and most often two or just one) won by other clubs.

Also in that same order, this trio has the biggest amount of supporters in Italy, spread through the whole country. In a reverse order, they also are the only three Italian clubs regarded as "World Champions" (on the ancient Intercontinental Cup or by FIFA Club World Cup) and winners of UEFA Champions League.

In 2002–03 UEFA Champions League, all three clubs were semifinalists. Milan prevailed after three draws: the "Euroderbies" against Internazionale for the semifinals ended 0–0 and 1–1, with the rossoneri reaching the final due to away goals rule. Milan then faced Juventus and won on penalty shoot-out after 0–0 in 120 minutes. The proposal of European Super League, in the beginning of the 2020s, had just these three clubs to represent Italian football.

== History ==
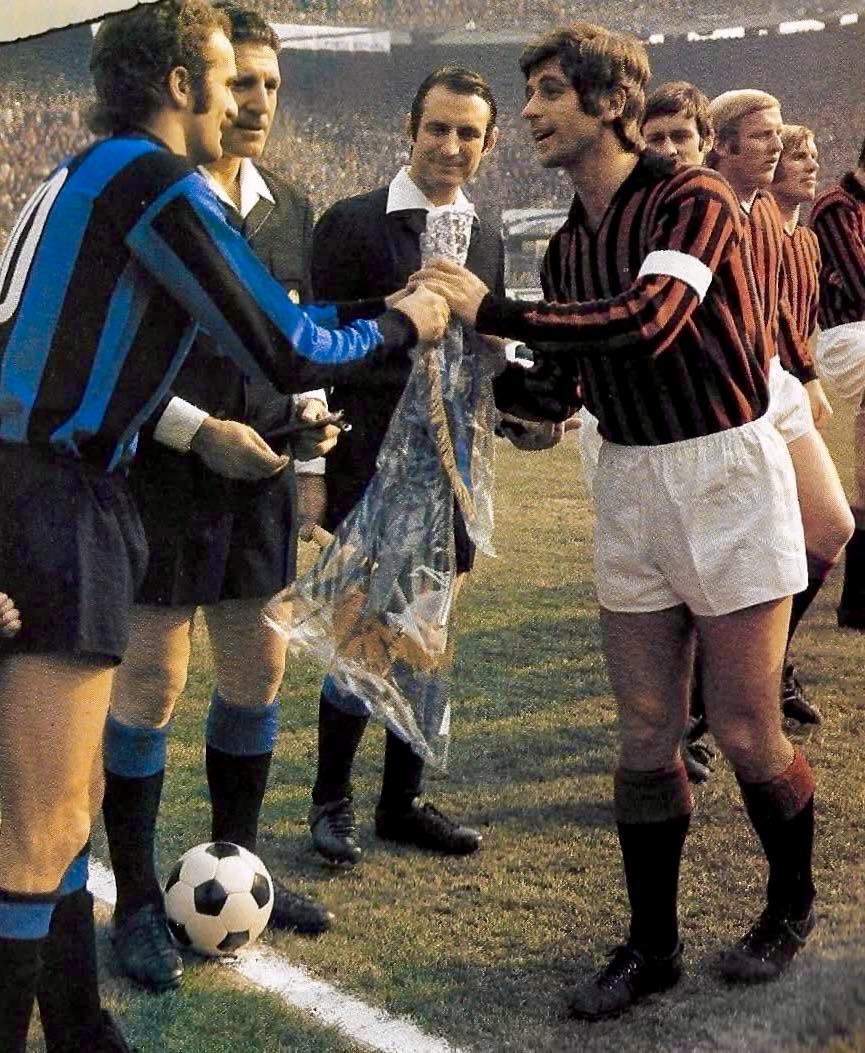
Internazionale vs. Milan at 1971

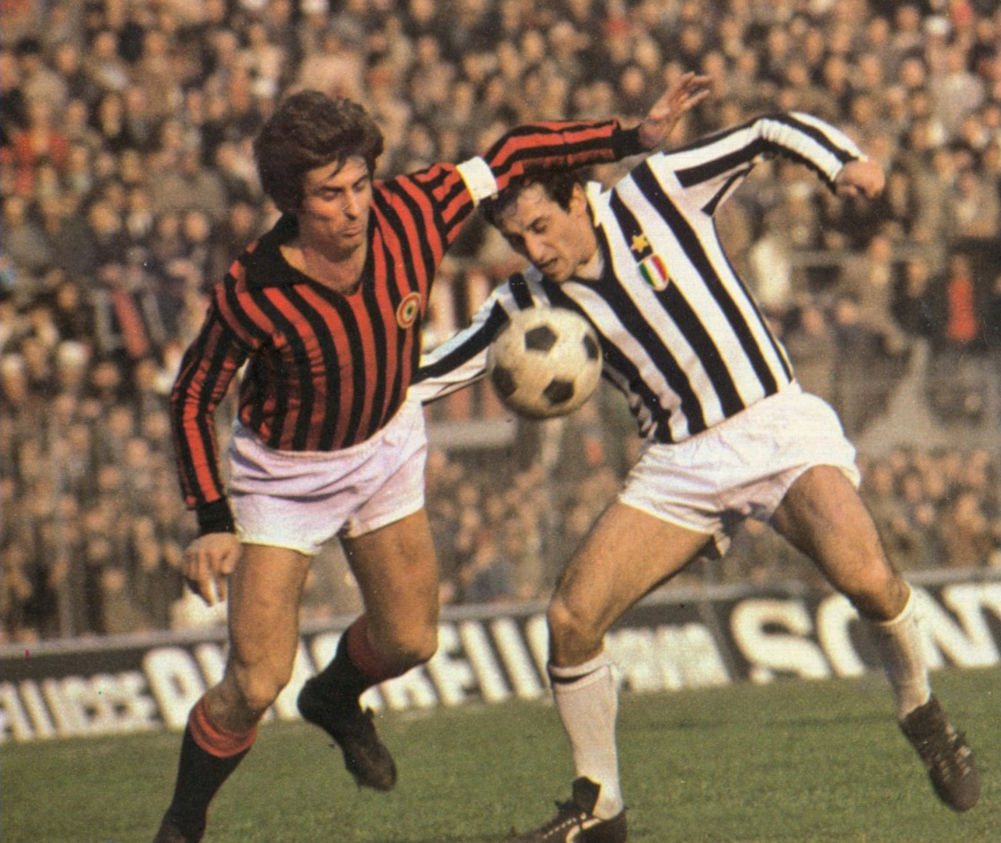
Milan vs. Juventus at 1973

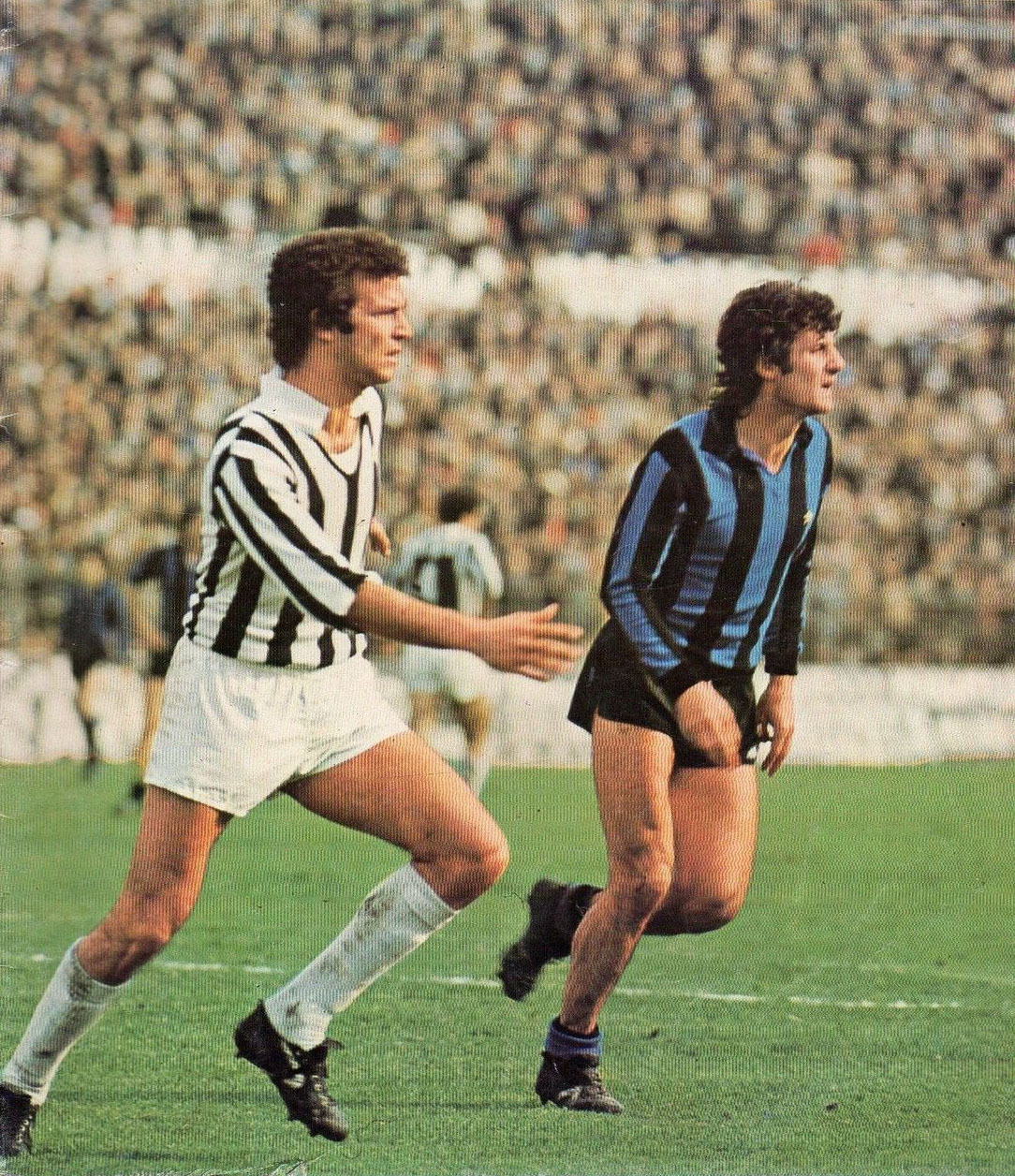
Juventus vs. Internazionale at 1975

The modern Serie A was established in 1929. Until then, the Italian First Division was not a nationwide round robin, being decided in finals among regional champions. This way have been used for thirty years since the creation of the Italian Championship in 1898. Genoa was the main team of this early era, winning his nine titles between 1898 and 1924. The second greatest winner, with seven scudetti (all of them also won until the 1920s), was Pro Vercelli.

Despite that domine of Genoa and Pro Vercelli, Milan (1901, 1906 and 1907), Juventus (1905 and 1926) and Internazionale (1910 and 1920) could also win their first titles on the seasons prior to 1929, but in the middle of more variety of champions: Casale and Novese won (respectively in 1914 and 1922) their only titles each one, while Bologna (1925 and 1929) and Torino (1928) could won for the first time.

By the 1930s the strongest trio was formed by Juventus and Internazionale along with Bologna, indeed the three most represented clubs in Italy national football team champion in 1934 FIFA World Cup and again in 1938 FIFA World Cup. The 1940s, apart for Roma first title (1942) and seasons still won by Juventus, Bologna and Internazionale, were dominated by the Grande Torino, champion five times in a row. However, after the Superga air disaster, Toro would won the Serie A just one more time, in 1976.

In the 1950s Milan could end more than forty years without the First Division, while Juventus and Internazionale also re-established themselves as consistent contenders for trophies. These two clubs, then with much more titles due to the decades of Milan's lack of winning seasons, even developed the Derby d'Italia in a race for being the biggest Italian champion. Juventus get his first star (for his tenth scudetto) in 1958. Internazionale, in 1966, with La Grande Inter reaching there also a difference of just two Italian titles below Juve. The Turin club would have more consistent winnings campaings in Serie A for the next two decades, reaching his second star in 1982. The nerazzurri waited for this until 2024, fact that did not cooled down the rivalry against the bianconeri, a feud still seen as bitter than the derby against Milan to Inter fans by the 2010s. In the same way, the tifosi from La Vecchia Signora use to regard Internazionale matches as more important than the Turin Derby due to Torino's decline.

Milan waited until 1979 for having his star on crest by winning his tenth scudetto, and by 2026 still did not reach another ten. Soon after the first and still lone star of the rossoneri, they suffered two relegations, in the beginning of the 1980s; but by the end of the same decade the club became the most powerful in Europe, establishing itself as the Italian team with most titles in UEFA Champions League. By the 2020s, Milan is still the second most winner of this tournament (seven times), behind only Real Madrid and having more than Internazionale (three) and Juventus (two) combined.

Since the introduction of Serie A in 1929, the biggest gap of years in a row not won by Juventus, Internazionale and Milan was the three seasons between 1941 and 1943, with titles of Bologna, Roma and Torino. Until 1950, that was not much uncommon be footballers playing for the trio of Giants. Their consolidation as the three biggest forces and the resulting inner rivalries paved a way for almost forty decades without another player in common in the Big Three.

The last title of Bologna (1964) or the only titles of Fiorentina (1956 and 1969) and Cagliari (1970) came between the 1950s and the late 1960s, the first two decades of the emergence of Juventus, Internazionale and Milan as the most often champions in the Serie A. Since 1970, just another few of seasons were not won by these three clubs: Lazio won its only titles in 1974 and 2000, Roma won in 1983 and 2001, Hellas Verona (1985) and Sampdoria (1991) had their only scudetti while Napoli was champion four times (1987, 1990, 2023 and 2025). These last titles of Lazio and Roma (2000 and 2001, respectively) are also the last period of two consecutive Serie A seasons won by clubs outside the Big Three.

Since the 2000s playing for the Big Three regained a certain frequency and even became a proof of the quality of the player envolved, although just eleven footballers (and three coaches) could do so until the 2020s.

== People in all three clubs ==
=== Footballers ===
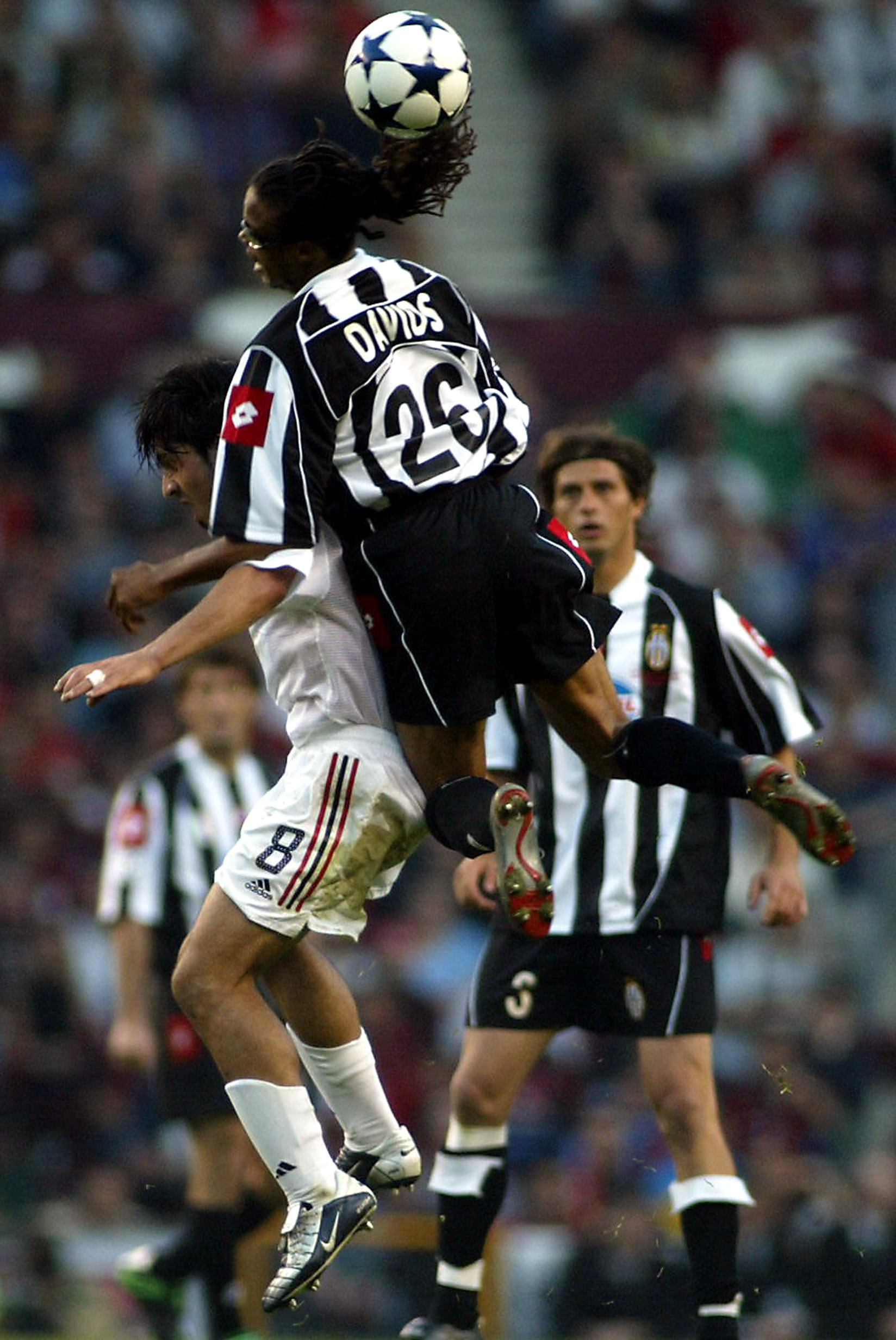
Milan vs. Juventus at 2003 UEFA Champions League final. The Dutchman Edgar Davids, pictured there, played in all Big Three clubs.

- (Italy) Luigi Cevenini: Milan 1911–12 and 1915–19; Internazionale 1912–15, 1919–21 and 1922–27, Juventus 1927–30.
- (Italy) Giuseppe Meazza: Internazionale 1927–40 and 1946–47; Milan 1940–42; Juventus 1942–43.
- (Italy) Enrico Candiani: Internazionale 1938–46; Juventus 1946–47; Milan 1949–50.
- (Italy) Aldo Serena: Internazionale 1977–78, 1981–82, 1983–84, 1985 and 1987–91; Milan 1982–83 and 1991–93; Juventus 1985–87.
- (Italy) Roberto Baggio: Juventus 1990–95; Milan 1995–97; Internazionale 1998–2000.
- (Netherlands) Edgar Davids: Milan 1996–97; Juventus 1997–2004; Internazionale 2004–05.
- (Italy) Christian Vieri: Juventus 1996–97; Internazionale 1999–2005; Milan 2005.
- (France) Patrick Vieira: Milan 1995–96; Juventus 2005–06; Internazionale 2006–10.
- (Sweden) Zlatan Ibrahimović: Juventus 2004–06; Internazionale 2006–2009; Milan 2010–12 and 2020–23.
- (Italy) Andrea Pirlo: Internazionale 1998–99 and 2000–01; Milan 2001–11; Juventus 2011–15.
- (Italy) Leonardo Bonucci: Internazionale 2005–07; Juventus 2010–17 and 2018–23; Milan 2017–18.

Cevenini had four brothers (Aldo, Mario, Cesare and Carlo), and curiously all of them did also play for both Internazionale and Milan. Aldo and Luigi Cevenini also hold for 111 years a record in being the only pair of brothers together in the same starting lineup of a Italy national football team match.

Meazza, although recognized as an all-time great in the sport, has his transfer from Internazionale to Milan attributed to early physical decline (caused by injuries), as he played for the rossoneri during this club's forty years of trophy drought.

Due to that decades of decadence at Milan at the Meazza years of player, being on the three clubs dit not necessarily bring yet "world class" quality status to the footballer envolved; contemporary of him, Candiani is indeed the only Big Three man who neved played for a national team. He was also for decades the last footballer on the entire trio, before its consolidation as the three strongest clubs in Italy.

Serena, the "successor" of Candiani, is the only Serie A champion with all three clubs as a player; Ibrahimović and Vieira could win with Internazionale and Milan, but their scudetti celebrated during their years in Juventus were revoked due to Calciopoli scandal. Giovanni Trapattoni was champion in all three clubs, as player in Milan and as coach by the other two.

Serena and Vieri are the only ones in also having played by both Turin and both city of Milan clubs. Serena was even Serie A runner up on his only season on Torino (1984–85) and Vieri debuted in adult football in this club, in 1991.

Besides the three clubs, Baggio also played on both sides in other rivalries, like the Derby dell'Appennino between Fiorentina and Bologna or the Fiorentina–Juventus feud.

Baggio and Pirlo were Internazionale fans on their childhoods, but curiously both of them had better performances with the other two clubs.

=== Coaches ===
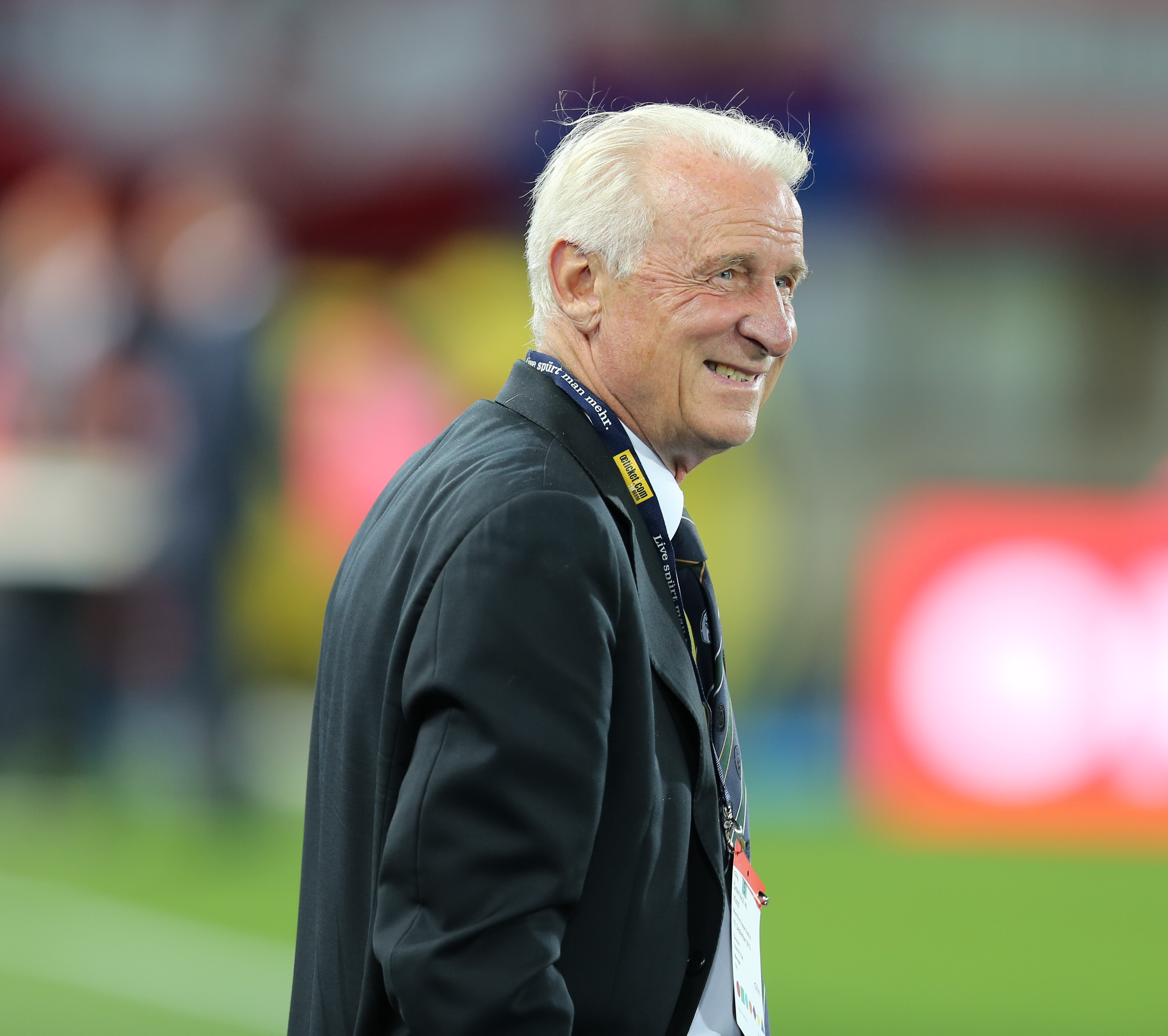
Giovanni Trapattoni won the Serie A and European trophies with all three clubs: as player for Milan and as coach for both Juventus and Internazionale.

- (Hungary) József Viola: Juventus 1928; Internazionale 1928–29; Milan 1933–34 and 1939–40.
- (Italy) Giovanni Trapattoni: Milan 1974–76; Juventus 1976–86 and 1991–94; Internazionale 1986–91.
- (Italy) Alberto Zaccheroni: Milan 1998–2001; Internazionale 2003–2004; Juventus 2010.

As players, Viola also had seasons on Juventus and Internazionale, while Trapattoni had a large career on Milan.

Trapattoni won Serie A and also European cups for all three: as Milan player, he was a member of 1963 UEFA Champions League winning team, also the first ever won by any Italian club. As coach, he managed in 1985 the first UEFA Champions League won by Juventus, a club in which he also won two UEFA Europa Leagues (1977 and 1993) and one UEFA Cup Winners' Cup (1984); and at Internazionale he won the 1991 UEFA Europa League.

Zaccheroni also coached Torino (2006–07), being the only one in managing both city of Milan and both Turin clubs.

== See also ==
- Derby d'Italia
- Derby della Madonnina
- Juventus FC–AC Milan rivalry
- Big Three (Belgium)
- Big Three (Costa Rica)
- Big Three (Greece)
- Big Three (Netherlands)
- Big Three (Peru)
- Big Three (Portugal)
- Big Three (Spain)
- Big Three (Sweden)
- Big Three (Turkey)
- Big Four (Mexico)
- Big Five (Argentina)
- Big Six (Premier League)
- Big Twelve (Brazil)
