= Big Three (Portugal) =

Nickname of the three most successful and biggest football clubs in Portugal

Location of the three clubs in Portugal

The Big Three (Portuguese: Os Três Grandes) is the nickname of the three most successful and biggest football clubs in Portugal. The teams of S.L. Benfica and Sporting CP, both from Lisbon, and of FC Porto, from Porto, have a great rivalry and are usually the main contenders for the Primeira Liga title.

They share all but two of the Portuguese Football Championships ever played, and generally end up sharing the top three positions. None of them has been relegated from the Primeira Liga either, having been participants in all editions since its first season in 1934–35. Benfica's lowest position was 6th out of 18 in 2000–01, while Porto's 9th-place finish out of 14 in 1969–70 is the closest any of the three sides have come to relegation. Sporting's worst finish was a 7th-place finish out of 16 in 2012–13.

Benfica and Porto are the only Portuguese teams to have won the European Cup/UEFA Champions League, which they have both won on two occasions. The closest Sporting came was in 1983 and 2026, when they reached the quarter-finals.

The only two clubs outside the Big Three to have won the Portuguese league are Belenenses, in the 1945–46 season, and Boavista, in the 2000–01 campaign. Belenenses has been relegated four times to the second tier, while Boavista has been in the third tier twice, and then, after economic problems, both had to start over in their district leagues (Lisbon and Porto, respectively).

In this trio of rivalry between fans, popular terms and nicknames were created to identify them and their clubs. Benfica fans are known as "benfiquistas" and "encarnados" ("reds"), but their bitter rivals call them "lampiões". Sporting fans, "sportinguistas" and "leões" ("lions"), are called "lagartos" ("lizards"),, while FC Porto supporters, "portistas" or "dragões ("dragons"), are nicknamed "andrades" and "tripeiros", despite the latter nickname also including people from Porto but who are fans of any other club (including Benfica and Sporting CP).

== Impact on society ==
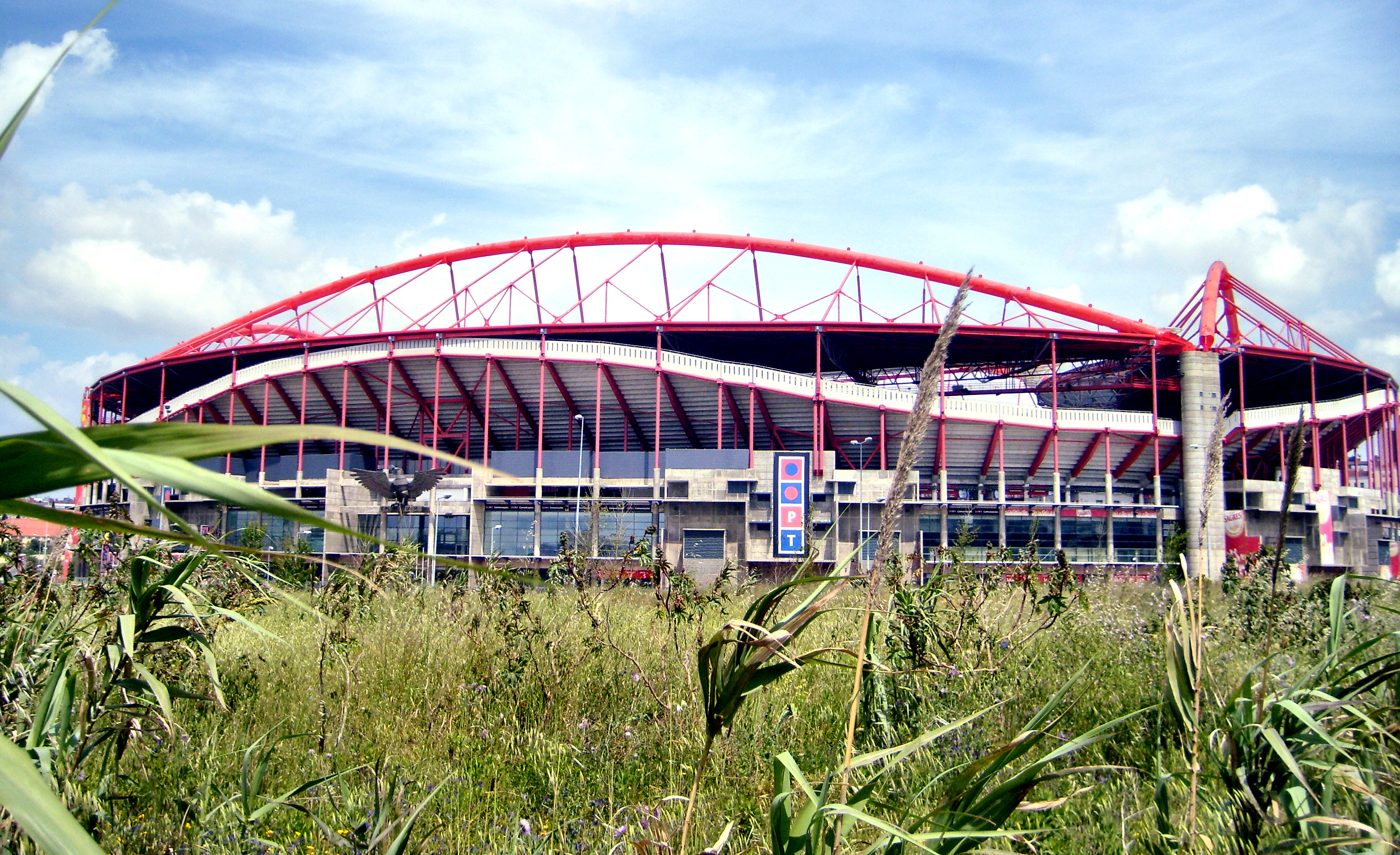
Benfica's Estádio da Luz

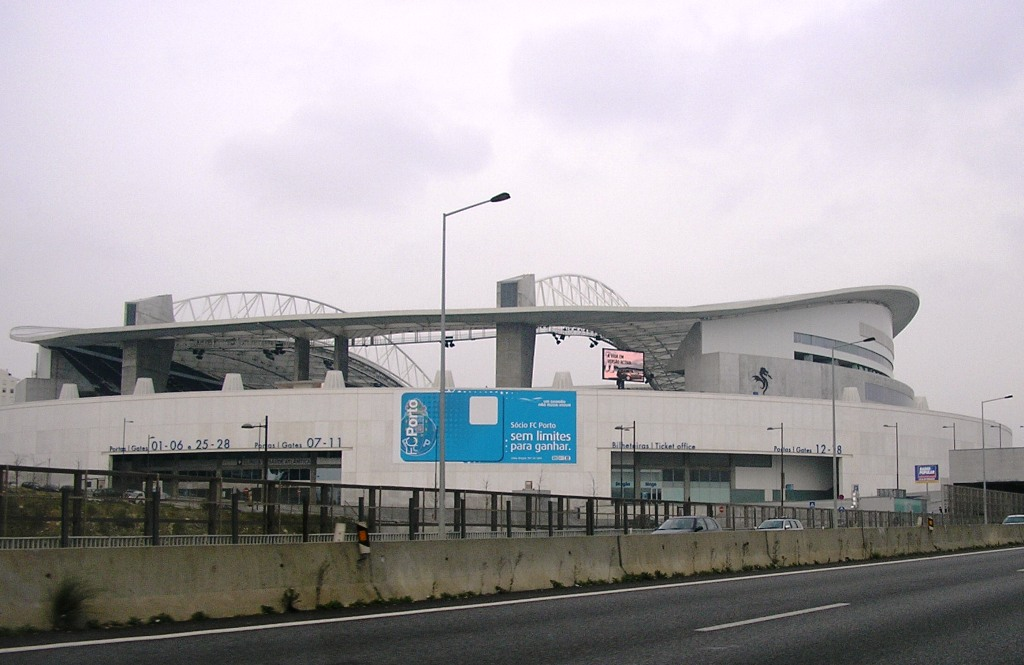
Porto's Estádio do Dragão

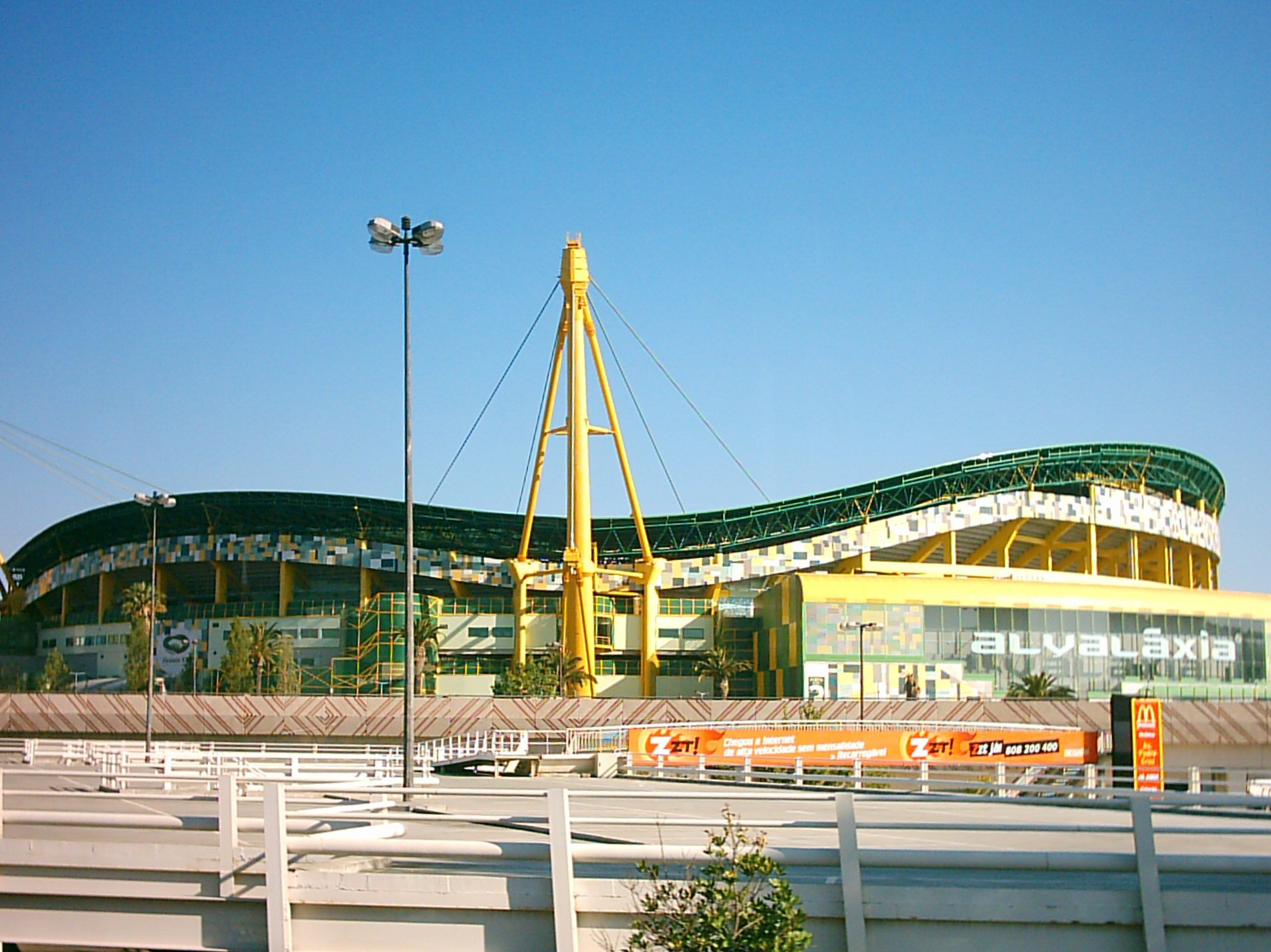
Sporting's Estádio José Alvalade

=== Fan support and attendances ===
As the most successful and frequent winners of the Primeira Liga, the Big Three clubs have established hegemony such that it results in the vast majority of Portuguese fans to support one of them, often ahead of their local team.

Thus, The Big Three have the highest average attendance each season in the Primeira Liga, while the other teams, without the support of the local population, have suffered from poor attendances (with the exception of Vitória de Guimarães, the only other team with an average attendance higher than the Primeira Liga's average attendance), partly due to the monopoly of the Big Three.

The Portuguese press, often accused of failing to fulfil any criteria of equality with the other clubs in the league who are constantly snubbed, is another reason often given for the majority of the Portuguese population to support one of these three teams based in Lisbon and Porto to the detriment of the team based in their own city.

The resulting problem is so serious that despite the good attendances at the Big Three matches, the rest of the stadiums are increasingly empty. During the 2010/11 Primeira Liga season, 30 percent of the matches played had fewer than 2,000 spectators.

Despite everything, the average attendance at Primeira Liga stadiums has been on the rise in the second half of the decade, with increases of more than 7% and 9% in 2015/16 and 2016/17 respectively. This is due to the increase in the average attendance at the D. Afonso Henriques (Vitória de Guimarães), Municipal de Chaves (Chaves), Barreiros (Marítimo) and Bessa (Boavista) stadiums, in addition to the average attendance increasing by more than 15,000 people at the José Alvalade Stadium (Sporting) between 2011 and 2018.

=== Audience development ===
Data in this graph is from EFS Attendances and since 2009/10 from Liga Portugal.

== Statistics ==
=== League placements ===
Club	Editions	1st	2nd	3rd	4th	5th	6th	7th	8th	9th
Benfica	92	38	31	18	4		1			
Porto	92	31	29	15	11	3	1	1		1
Sporting	92	21	22	30	14	4		1		

=== Honours comparison ===
National	Benfica	Porto	Sporting
Championship of Portugal	3	4	4
Portuguese League	38	31	21
Portuguese Cup	26	20	18
Portuguese League Cup	8	1	4
Portuguese Super Cup	10	25	9
Total	85	81	56
International	Benfica	Porto	Sporting
European Cup / UEFA Champions League	2	2	—
UEFA Cup / UEFA Europa League	—	2	—
European / UEFA Super Cup	—	1	—
Intercontinental Cup	—	2	—
UEFA Cup Winners' Cup	—	—	1
Total	2	7	1
Grand Total	87	88	57

=== All-time league table ===
Club	Editions	Played	Wins	Draws	Losses	GS	GC	GD	Points
Benfica	92	2634	1810	489	335	6340	2291	4049	4109
Porto	92	2634	1770	470	394	5819	2294	3525	4010
Sporting	92	2634	1654	541	439	5769	2471	3296	3849

== People associated with all three clubs ==
=== Players who played for all three clubs ===
Eight footballers have played for Benfica, Porto, and Sporting. Of those, only Eurico Gomes won the domestic league for all three (twice with each club). Additionally, Eurico is also the only player to enter the following list without having played for another club in-between his Big Three career.

Fernando Mendes is the only player to have represented the five Portuguese clubs who have won a Primeira Liga title, by having also seasons in Boavista and Belenenses. In 2002, he declared being proud of this record.

- (Portugal) Carlos Alhinho: Sporting 1972–75; Porto 1976; Benfica 1976–77, 1978–81
- (Portugal) Eurico Gomes: Benfica 1975–79; Sporting 1979–82; Porto 1982–87
- (Portugal) Romeu Silva: Benfica 1975–77; Porto 1979–83; Sporting 1983–86
- (Portugal) Paulo Futre: Sporting 1983–84; Porto 1984–87; Benfica 1993
- (Portugal) Fernando Mendes: Sporting 1985–89; Benfica 1989–91, 1992–93; Porto 1996–99
- (Portugal) Emílio Peixe: Sporting 1991–95, 1996–97; Porto 1997–2002; Benfica 2002–03
- (Brazil) Derlei: Porto 2002–05; Benfica 2007 (loan); Sporting 2007–09
- (Portugal) Maniche: Benfica 1995–96, 1999–2002; Porto 2002–05; Sporting 2010–11
- (Portugal) Miguel Lopes: Benfica 2005–06; Porto 2009–10, 2012–13; Sporting 2013, 2014–15

=== Managers who managed all three clubs ===
Glória and Riera both had seasons also in Belenenses while Jesualdo also had coached Boavista.

- (Brazil) Otto Glória: Benfica 1954–59, 1968–70; Sporting 1961, 1965–66; Porto 1964–65
- (Chile) Fernando Riera: Benfica 1962–63, 1966–68; Porto 1972–73; Sporting 1974–75
- (Portugal) Fernando Santos: Porto 1998–2001; Sporting 2003–04; Benfica 2006–07
- (Portugal) Jesualdo Ferreira: Benfica 2001–03; Porto 2006–10, Sporting 2013

== See also ==
Benfica vs. Porto:

Benfica vs. Sporting:

Porto vs. Sporting:

- Big Three (Belgium)
- Big Three (Costa Rica)
- Big Three (Greece)
- Big Three (Italy)
- Big Three (Netherlands)
- Big Three (Peru)
- Big Three (Spain)
- Big Three (Sweden)
- Big Three (Turkey)
- Big Four (Mexico)
- Big Five (Argentina)
- Big Six (Premier League)
- Big Twelve (Brazil)
