= Big Three (Belgium) =

Group of successful association football clubs

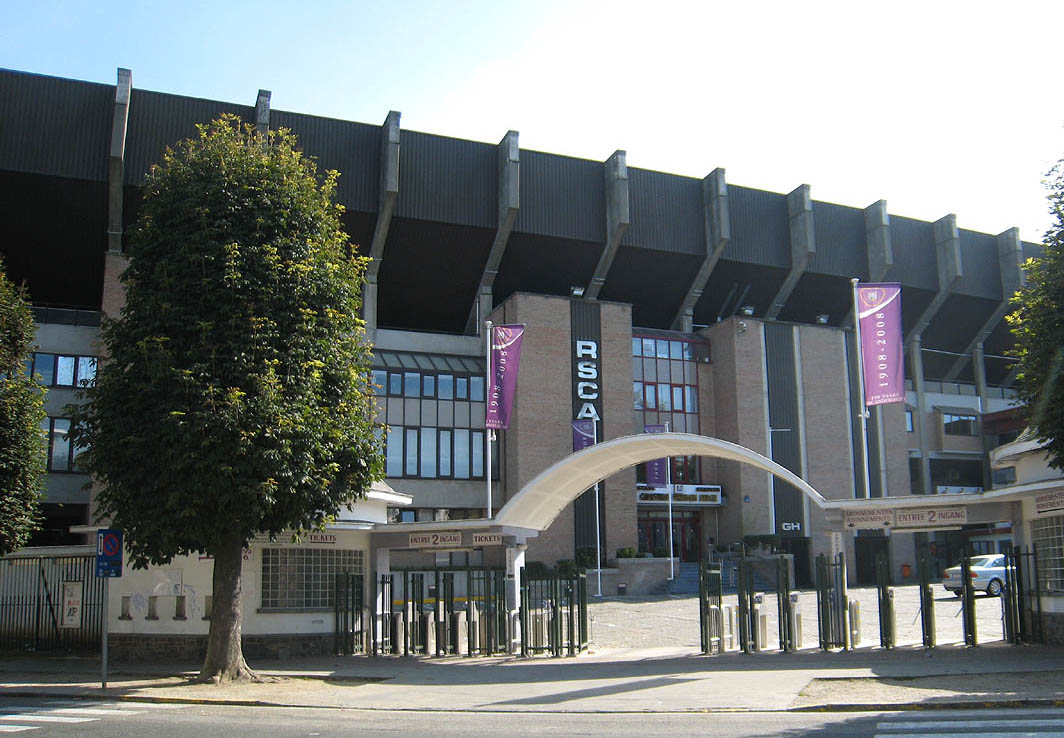
Anderlecht, Constant Vanden Stock

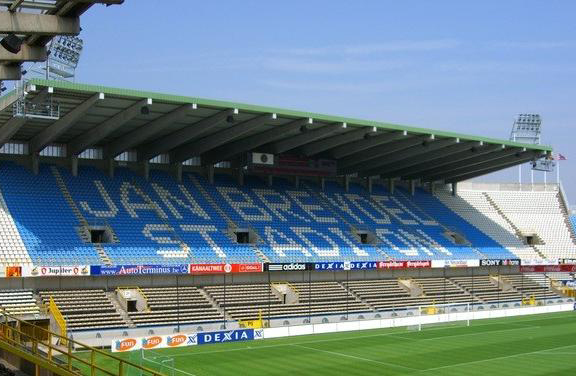
Club Brugge, Jan Breydel Stadium

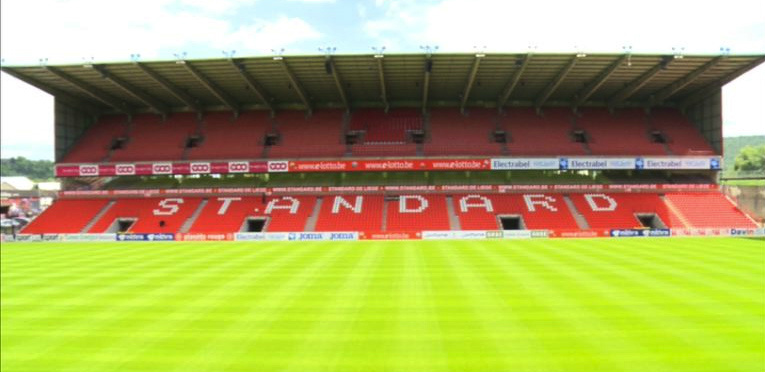
Standard Liège, Stade Maurice Dufrasne

The Big Three (Dutch: De Grote Drie, French: Les Trois Grands) is the nickname of the three most successful sports clubs in Belgium. The football teams of RSC Anderlecht, Club Brugge KV and Standard Liège have a great rivalry, and are usually the main contenders for the title. Combined they share a total of 64 out of 123 Belgian Football Championships ever played and generally end up sharing the top three positions. None of them have been relegated from the First Division A either, since promotion to the top flight. In recent years however, the domination of the Big Three has become less severe, as Anderlecht and Standard have had some difficult seasons. Anderlecht has not won a title since 2017 and Standard not win since 2009. Next to that, some other clubs like Union SG, Antwerp, Genk and Gent have become major contenders for prizes.

Location of the three clubs in Belgium

Several other clubs outside the big three have won the Belgian league, with Union SG having the third most national titles behind Anderlecht and Club Brugge in Belgium with 12 in total; two titles more than Standard Liège. Today, the chief competitors of the three are Gent, Union SG, Antwerp and Racing Genk.

== See also ==
- Big Three (Costa Rica)
- Big Three (Greece)
- Big Three (Italy)
- Big Three (Netherlands)
- Big Three (Peru)
- Big Three (Portugal)
- Big Three (Spain)
- Big Three (Sweden)
- Big Three (Turkey)
- Big Four (Mexico)
- Big Five (Argentina)
- Big Six (Premier League)
- Big Twelve (Brazil)
