= Luis Miranda Junco =

Spanish footballer (1919–1969)

Luis Miranda
Personal information
- Full name: Luis Miranda Junco
- Date of birth: 10 May 1919
- Place of birth: Las Palmas, Spain
- Date of death: 17 August 1969 (aged 50)
- Place of death: Las Palmas, Spain
- Position: Midfielder

Senior career*
Years	Team	Apps	(Gls)
1937–1939	Real Club Victoria		
1939	Real Madrid		
1939	Atlético Aviación		
1940	Barcelona	1	(1)
1940–1942	Atlético Aviación	4	(3)
1943–1947	Real Club Victoria		
Total		5	(4)
- * Club domestic league appearances and goals

Luis Miranda Junco (10 May 1919 – 17 August 1969) was a Spanish footballer who played as a forward for Real Madrid, Atlético Madrid, and Barcelona between 1939 and 1942.

== Career ==
Born in Las Palmas on 10 May 1919, Miranda began his career at his hometown club Real Club Victoria in 1937, aged 18, from which he joined Real Madrid in 1939, with whom he scored 2 goals in 3 official matches, all in the Centro Regional Championship. After a brief stint at Atlético Madrid (then known as Atlético Aviación), Miranda joined Barcelona, with whom he played only one official match, a La Liga fixture against Sevilla at Les Corts on 4 February 1940, scoring his side's only goal in a 1–2 loss. He was noted for his goalscoring prowess as well as his sportsmanship, having never been cautioned by a referee.

In 1940, Miranda returned to Aviación, where he failed to make a single league appearance in his first season as the club won the 1940–41 La Liga. He is thus one of the few footballers who played for both Madrid and Atlético. In his second and final season at the club, he scored 3 goals in 4 La Liga matches. In total, he scored 4 goals in 5 La Liga matches for Barça and Atlético. He then returned to his hometown, joining Real Club Victoria, where he retired in 1947, aged 28.

== Death ==
Miranda died in Las Palmas on 17 August 1969, at the age of 50.

== Honours ==
Atlético Aviación

- La Liga:
  - Champions (1): 1940–41
