= Big Three (Costa Rica) =

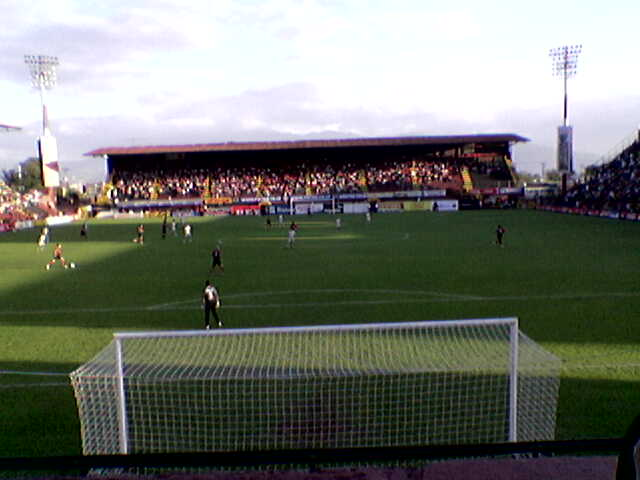
Alajuelense, Alejandro Morera Soto

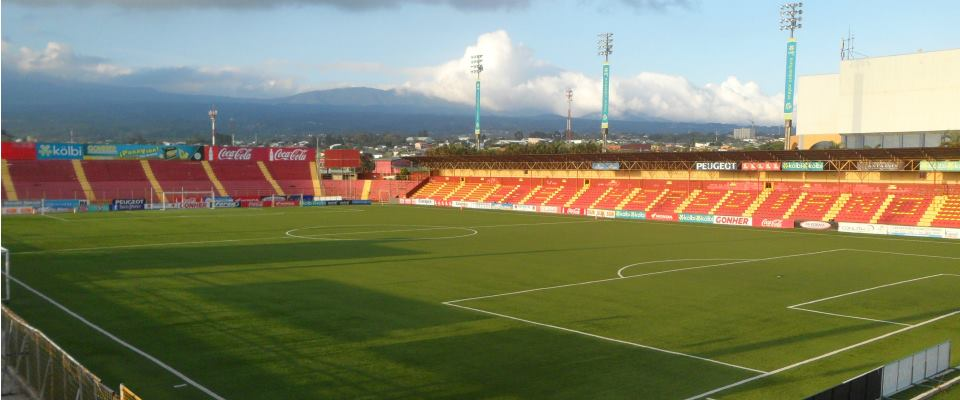
Herediano, Eladio Rosabal Cordero

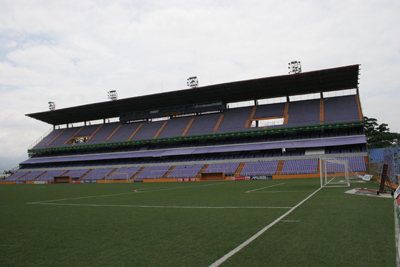
Saprissa, Ricardo Saprissa Aymá

The Big Three (Spanish: Los Tres Grandes) is the nickname of the three most successful sports clubs in Costa Rica. The football teams of Deportivo Saprissa, LD Alajuelense, and CS Herediano have a great rivalry, and are usually the main contenders for the title. Combined they share a total of 86 out of 103 Costa Rican Football Championships ever played and generally end up sharing the top three positions. None of them have been relegated from the Primera División either, having been participants in all editions since 1921.

Location of the three clubs in Costa Rica

Several clubs outside the big three have won the Costa Rican league, with CS La Libertad having the fourth-most national titles behind the Big Three in Costa Rica, with six. Today, their chief competitors are CS Cartaginés SG Española and Orión F.C.

== See also ==
- Big Three (Belgium)
- Big Three (Greece)
- Big Three (Italy)
- Big Three (Netherlands)
- Big Three (Peru)
- Big Three (Portugal)
- Big Three (Spain)
- Big Three (Turkey)
