= Little One =

Little One may refer to:

== Literature ==
- The Little One (book), a children's picture book by Kiyo Tanaka

== Music ==
- The Little Ones (band), a band based in Los Angeles, California
- "Little One" (1956 song), a Cole Porter/Bing Crosby song written for the film High Society
- "Little One" (Beck song), 2002
- "Little One" (Bilal song), 2010
- "Little One" (Chicago song), 1978
- "Little One" (Highly Suspect song), 2016
- "Little One", a 2004 song by Elliott Smith from the album From a Basement on the Hill
- Little One Tour, a 2011 concert tour by Bilal

== Film ==
- Little One (1935 film), a French comedy film directed by Henry Wulschleger
- Little One (2012 film), a South African film directed by Darrell Roodt
- The Little Ones, a 1965 British family comedy film

== See also ==
- The Small One (book), a 1947 Christmas novelette written by Charles Tazewell
  - The Small One (album), a 1947 album by Bing Crosby of the Tazewell story
  - The Small One, a 1978 animated featurette by Walt Disney Productions
- My Little One (disambiguation)
- Big One (disambiguation)
