= SKY school =

Sky School or SKY School may refer to:

- SKY (universities), South Korea
- Alama Education, previously Sky School, UK
