= Big Three =

The "Big Three" usually describes the three most prominent entities in any given grouping or subject. It may refer to:

== Arts and entertainment ==
- Big Three (American television), the three major traditional commercial broadcast television networks in the United States (ABC, CBS, and NBC)
- The "Big Three" music labels
- "The Big 3" or Robbins, Feist & Miller (1934-1973), music publishing division of Metro-Goldwyn-Mayer
- The Big Three (English band)
- The Big Three (astrology)
- The Big 3 (folk group), a folk trio comprising Cass Elliot, Tim Rose, and James Hendricks
- The Big Three, an R&B ensemble led by Willie Dixon
- The Big 3 (Milt Jackson album), 1975
- The Big Three (video game)

== Sports ==
=== Association football ===
- Big Three (Belgium), the three most successful association football clubs in Belgium
- Big Three (Costa Rica), the three most successful association football clubs in Costa Rica
- Big Three (Greece), the three most successful association football clubs in Greece
- Big Three (India), in the Calcutta Football League, Mohammedan SC (Kolkata), East Bengal FC, Mohun Bagan
- Big Three (Italy), the three most successful association football clubs in Italy
- Big Three (Netherlands), the three most successful association football clubs in the Netherlands
- Big Three (Peru), the three most successful association football clubs in Peru
- Big Three (Portugal), the three most successful association football clubs in Portugal
- Big Three (Spain), the three most successful association football clubs in Spain
- Big Three (Sweden), the three most successful association football clubs in Sweden
- Big Three (Turkey), the three most successful association football clubs in Turkey

=== Basketball ===
- Big3, a professional 3-on-3 basketball league
- Big Three (Boston Celtics, 1980–1992), Larry Bird, Kevin McHale, and Robert Parish
- Big Three (Boston Celtics, 2007–2012), Kevin Garnett, Ray Allen, and Paul Pierce
- Big Three (San Antonio Spurs), Tim Duncan, Tony Parker, and Manu Ginóbili
- Big Three (Miami Heat), LeBron James, Dwyane Wade, and Chris Bosh

=== Other sports ===
- Big Three (cricket), members of the International Cricket Council, England Cricket Board, Board of Control for Cricket in India and Cricket Australia
- Big Three (tennis), Novak Djokovic, Rafael Nadal, and Roger Federer
- Big Three (colleges), Harvard University, Yale University, and Princeton University
- Big Three (hurling), the hurling county teams of Cork, Kilkenny, and Tipperary
- Big Three (Atlanta Braves), Tom Glavine, Greg Maddux, and John Smoltz
- Big Three (Oakland Athletics), Tim Hudson, Mark Mulder, and Barry Zito
- Big Three, Penn State, Pittsburgh, and West Virginia football teams symbolized by the Old Ironsides Trophy

== Other uses ==
- Big Three (automobile manufacturers), a country's three largest automobile manufacturers
- Big Three (credit rating agencies), S&P Global, Moody's Investors Service, and Fitch Ratings
- Big Three (management consultancies), McKinsey & Company, Boston Consulting Group, and Bain & Company
- Big Three (World War II), Franklin Roosevelt, Winston Churchill, and Joseph Stalin during World War II
- Big Three (Maine colleges), Colby-Bates-Bowdoin Consortium

== See also ==
- Little Three
- Crucial Three
- The Three (disambiguation)
- Big One (disambiguation)
- Big Two (disambiguation)
- Big Four (disambiguation)
- Big Five (disambiguation)
- Big Six (disambiguation)
- Big Seven (disambiguation)
- Big Eight (disambiguation)
- Big Ten (disambiguation)
- Big 12 (disambiguation)
