= Big Four =

Big Four or Big 4 may refer to:

== Groups of companies ==
- Big Four accounting firms globally: Deloitte, EY, KPMG, PwC
- Big Four (airlines) in the U.S. in the 20th century: American, Eastern, TWA, and United
- Big Four (banking), several groupings of banks in different countries
- Big Four (British railway companies) in the period 1923–1947: GWR, LMS, LNER, and SR
- Big Four Railroad, a nickname of the Cleveland, Cincinnati, Chicago and St. Louis Railway in the U.S.
- The "Big Four" Big Tech companies: Apple, Amazon, Alphabet, and Meta Platforms
- Big Four television networks in the U.S.: NBC, CBS, ABC and DuMont initially, then NBC, CBS, ABC, and Fox
- Big Four radio networks in the U.S.: NBC Red, NBC Blue, CBS, and Mutual
- The "Big Four" largest UK ITV companies 1955–1968: History of ITV § The Big Four and Big Five
- Japanese Big Four motorcycle manufacturers: Honda, Kawasaki, Suzuki, and Yamaha
- Big Four (record labels), major record labels (Universal, Sony, Warner, and BMG)
- Big Four state-owned car manufacturers in China: SAIC Motor, FAW Group, Changan Automobile, and Dongfeng Motor Corporation

== Groups of people ==
- Big Four (Central Pacific Railroad), 19th century American railroad entrepreneurs
- Big Four (debutantes), in the Chicago social scene during World War I
- Big Four (Najaf), leading Grand Ayatollahs of Twelver Shia Islam
- The Four Companions, the most loyal companions of Muhammad and Ali
- Big Four of Maryland Thoroughbred racing, horse trainers in the 1960s–1970s
- The Big Four (Calgary), Alberta cattlemen of the early 20th century

== Groups in sport ==
- Big Four (Canadian football), a forerunner competition to the Canadian Football League East Division
- Big Four (English football) in the 2000s: Arsenal, Chelsea, Liverpool, and Manchester United
- Big Four (Mexico), a group of the top four football clubs in Mexico: Club América, Chivas del Guadalajara, Cruz Azul and Pumas UNAM
- Big Four (cycling) in the 2020s: Pogačar, Vingegaard, Roglič, and Evenepoel
- Big Four (polo), an American polo team of the early 20th century
- Big Four (tennis), from 2008 to 2017: Federer, Nadal, Djokovic, and Murray
- Big Four, the leading major professional sports leagues in the United States and Canada: MLB, NBA, NFL, and NHL
- Big-4 League, a senior ice hockey league in Canada between 1919 and 1921
- Big four (boxing), the four major sanctioning organizations: IBF, WBA, WBC, and WBO

== Other groups ==
- Big Four (Western Europe): France, Germany, Italy, and the UK
- Big Four Conference, various conferences between the victorious nations after World War I and World War II
- Big Four (World War I), the four major Allied powers: the US, UK, France, and Italy
- Big Four (World War II), or Four Policemen: the US, UK, China, and the Soviet Union
- Big Four outlaw motorcycle clubs: Hells Angels, Pagans, Outlaws, and Bandidos
- Big Four international beauty pageants: Miss Earth, Miss International, Miss Universe, and Miss World
- Big Four (universities), the top four universities in the Philippines

== Arts, entertainment and media ==
- Big Four (band), a Hong Kong music group
- Big Four (Eurovision), the four main sponsoring countries before 2011 and after 2025
- Big Four (Grammy Awards) or the General Field, four standard awards
- The Big Four (fashion), the four most notable Vogue covers: American Vogue, British Vogue, Vogue France and Vogue Italia
- The Big Four fashion weeks: New York City, London, Milan and Paris
- The Big Four of thrash metal: Metallica, Slayer, Megadeth, and Anthrax
  - The Big Four: Live from Sofia, Bulgaria a 2010 concert recording featuring all four bands
- The Big Four (film studios): Comcast/Universal, Skydance, Walt Disney, and Sony
- Big Four, a key rhythmic innovation on the marching band beat, invented by Buddy Bolden
- Big 4 (sculpture), outside the Channel 4 headquarters in London
- The Big Four (novel), by Agatha Christie, 1927
- The Big 4, a 2022 Indonesian movie
- Big Four (American television)

== Places ==
- Big Four, West Virginia, U.S.
- Big Four Bridge, connecting Louisville, Kentucky, and Jeffersonville, Indiana, U.S.
- Big Four Mountain, Washington, U.S.

== Other uses ==
- Big 4 (lottery), a game in the Pennsylvania Lottery
- Big Four (Indian snakes), four snake species responsible for the most snake-bites in India
- Big Four (White Star Line), four British ocean liners of the early 20th century
- Norton Big 4, a British motorcycle 1907–1954
- The Big Four, restaurant in the Huntington Hotel (San Francisco)

== See also ==
- Big One (disambiguation)
- Big Two (disambiguation)
- Big Three (disambiguation)
- Big Five (disambiguation)
- Big Six (disambiguation)
- Big Seven (disambiguation)
- Big Eight (disambiguation)
- Big Ten (disambiguation)
- Big 12 (disambiguation)
- Core Four
- Fab Four
- Quadruple Alliance (disambiguation)
- Four Heavenly Kings (disambiguation)
