= Mighty Sound of Maryland =

Marching band of the University of Maryland, College Park

The Mighty Sound of Maryland
- School: University of Maryland
- Location: College Park, Maryland, U.S.
- Conference: Big Ten Conference
- Founded: 1908
- Director: Dr. Andrea Brown (Associate Director of Bands, Director of the Mighty Sound of Maryland)
- Assistant Director: Dr. Kevin Niese (Assistant Director of Bands, UMD Pep Band)
- Members: 264 (2026)
- Fight song: "The Victory Song"

Uniform
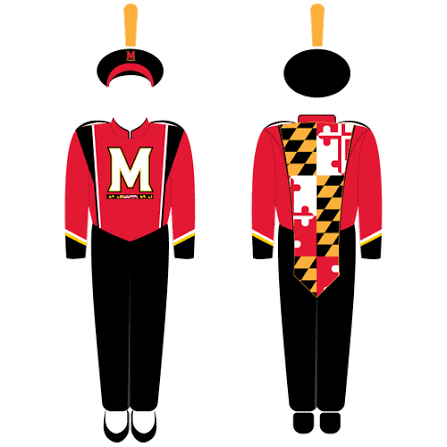
- Website: Mighty Sound of Maryland Marching Band

The Mighty Sound of Maryland (MSOM) is the marching band of the University of Maryland. The band was founded in 1908 at what was then known as the Maryland Agricultural College. Currently based in the Clarice Smith Performing Arts Center , the Mighty Sound of Maryland is composed of students representing all 12 colleges and schools at the University of Maryland and serve as a highly visible ambassador for the university and state.

The band performs pregame, halftime, and fifth-quarter shows at all Maryland Terrapins home football games. The band also performs at all the bowl games where the Maryland Terrapins football team plays, exhibitions at local competitions and showcases in the DC-Maryland-Virginia Metropolitan area, and Campus Concerts throughout the football season.

== History ==
=== 1908-1929 ===
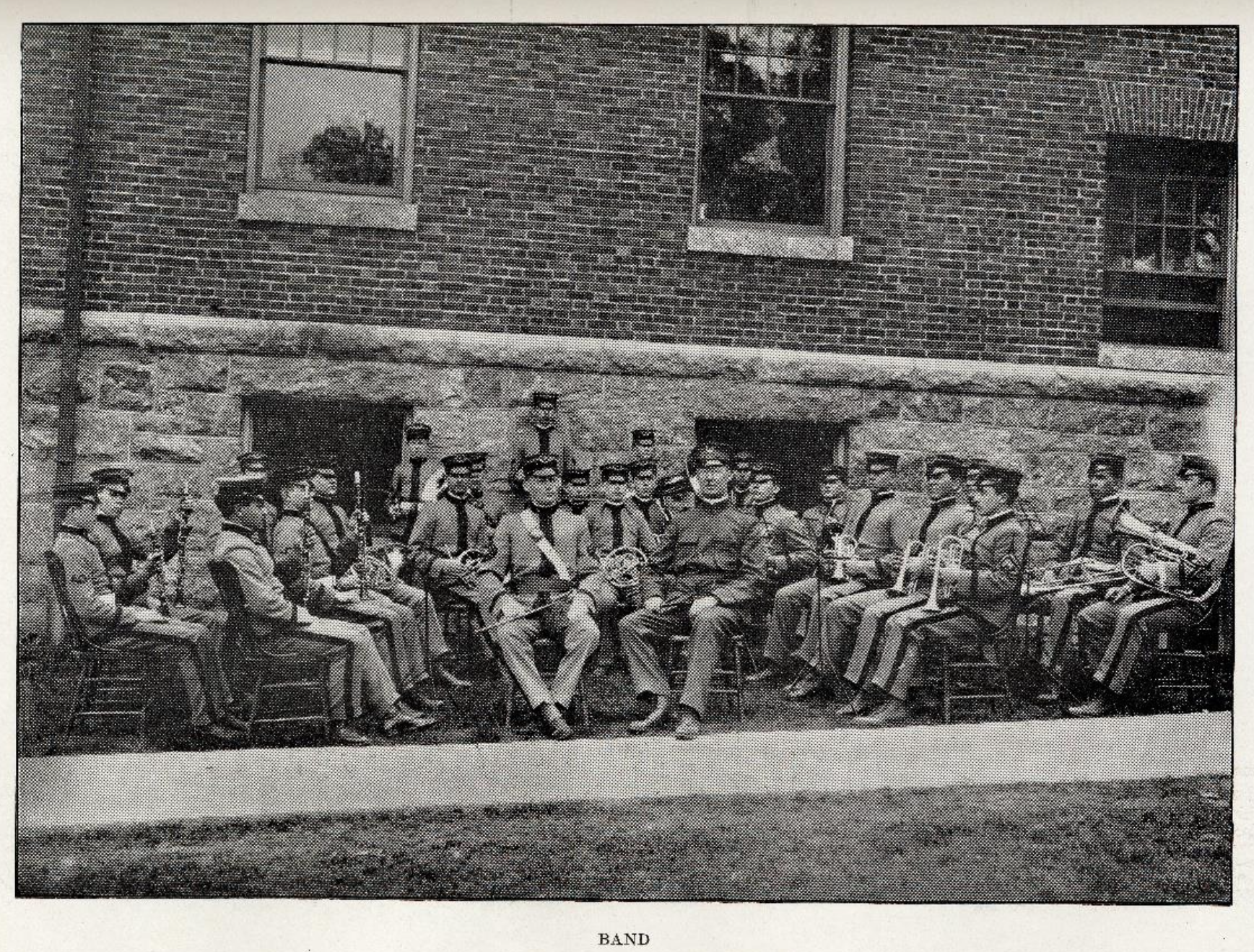
Maryland Agricultural College Cadet Band rehearsal outside the barracks.

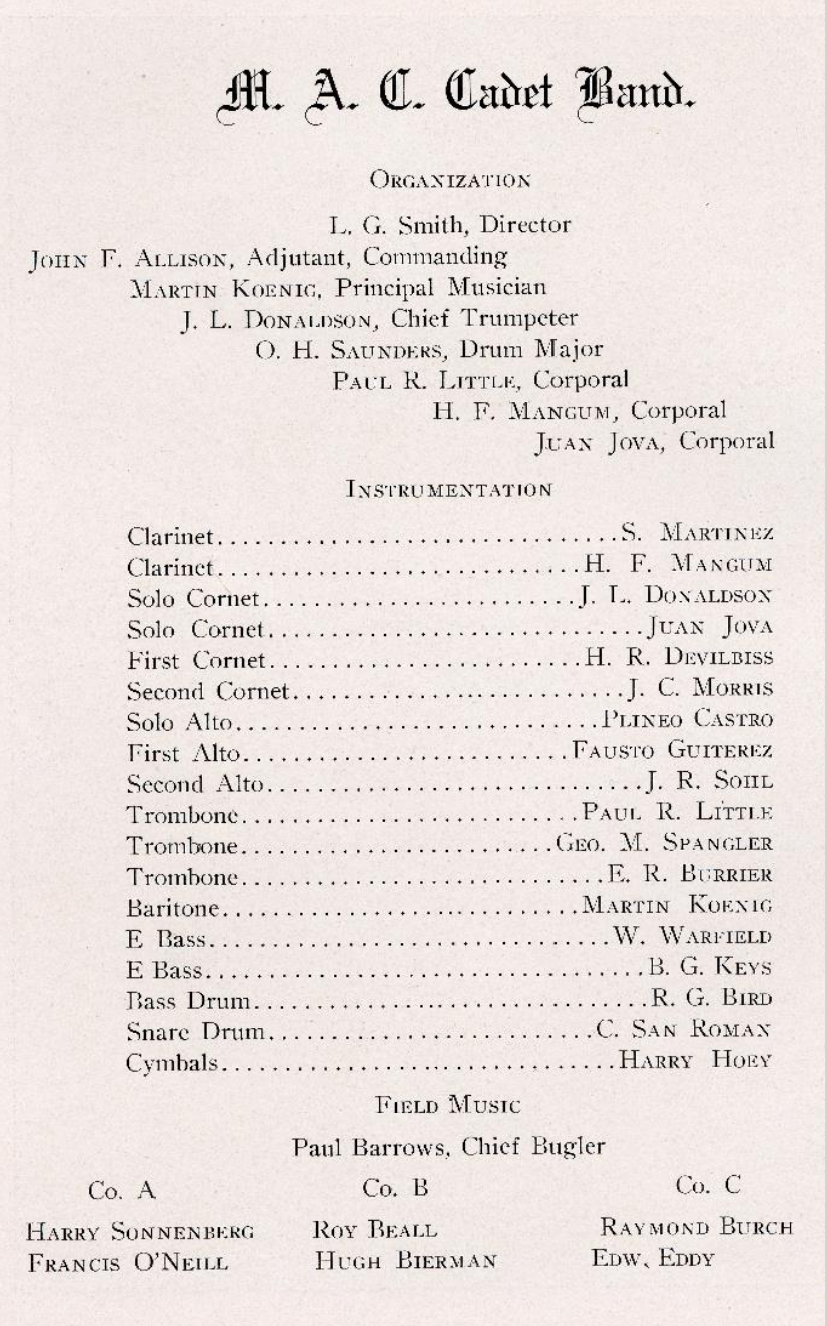
1908 Maryland Agricultural College Cadet Band Roster.

The ensemble was founded in 1908 at what was then known as the Maryland Agricultural College. For the approximately 50 years prior to the founding of the cadet band, the agriculture and military focused school relied on the Cadet Corps Drum and Buglers for music. That year, the college brought in Levi G. Smith, a local violinist, to organize a band capable of playing for formal ROTC functions. The result was a 25-piece ensemble originally named the Maryland Agricultural College Cadet Band. The Cadet Band's first home was located in the barracks behind present day South Campus Dining Hall. While initially formed to perform for the ROTC, the Cadet Band quickly branched out to school and local events. One notable event from this era of the band was marching in Woodrow Wilson's Second Inauguration Parade in 1917. In 1928, Sgt. Otto Siebeneichen, a retired bandmaster of the United States Army Band, was appointed the first full-time director as a part of the colleges faculty.

In 1924, the Old Byrd Stadium was built. It occupied the location where Fraternity Row now stands. The stadium was razed in 1953 so that construction of Frat Row could begin.

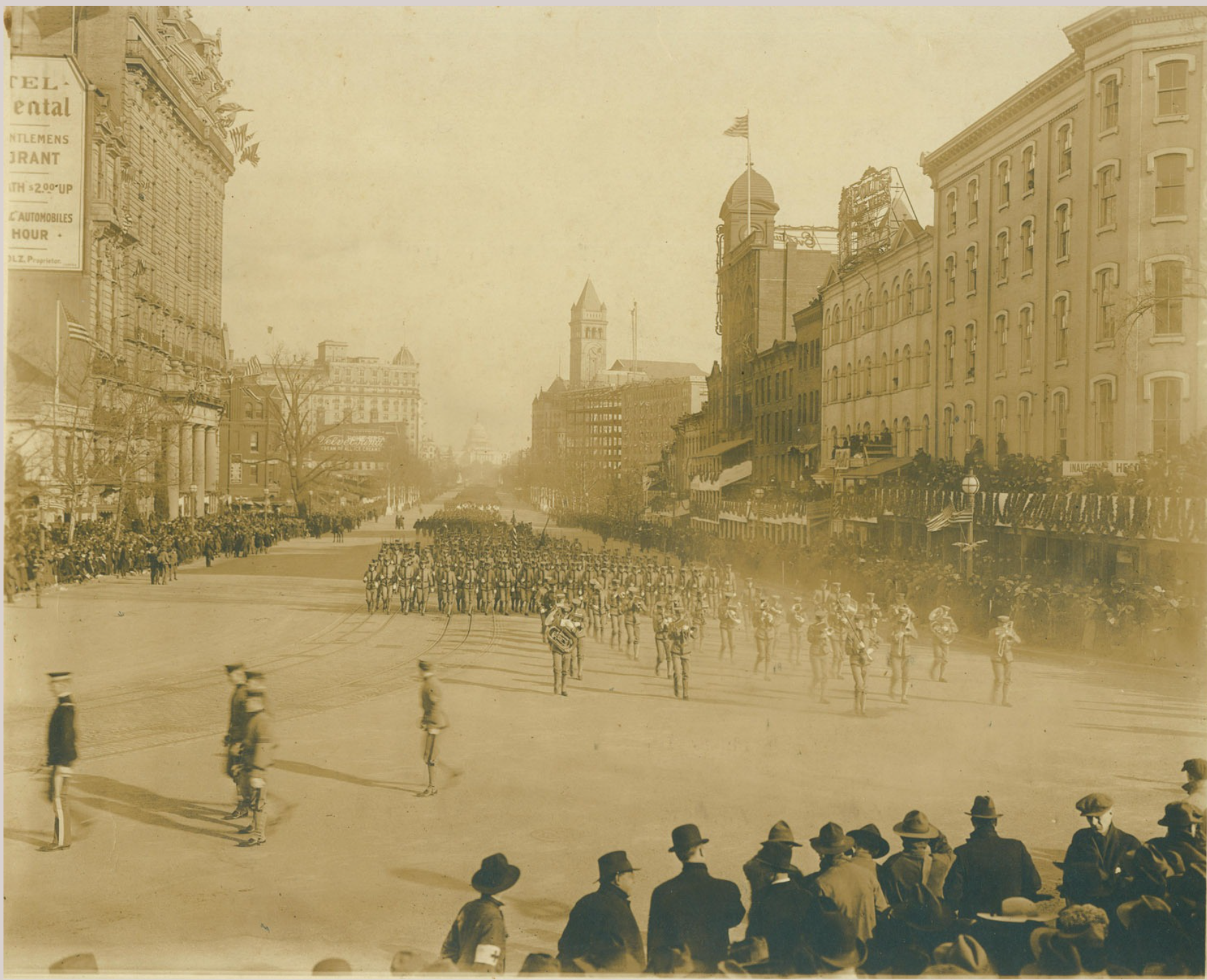
Maryland Agricultural College Cadet Band performs at Woodrow Wilson's Inauguration Parade in 1917.

=== 1930-1949 ===
The band continued to establish its presence on campus and nationally during the mid-20th century. During World War II, the band faced low membership significantly reducing its community performances. Following the war, Frank V. Sykora, a graduate of the Imperial Russian Conservatory (Ukrainian National Academy of Music) in Kyiv directed the band from 1947-1949. Under his leadership membership grew to over 100 members and the band began traveling extensively. To reflect its growth and modernization following the war, the organization underwent its first major rebrand in 1947 when it officially changed its name from the Maryland Agricultural College Cadet Band to the Big Red and White University of Maryland Marching Band.

=== 1950-1969 ===
In 1950, New Byrd Stadium opened and has undergone significant renovation in the 75 years since. That same year the Big Red and White Band became under the guidance of Captain Robert "Bob" L. Landers who previously directed the "Singing Sergeants" of in the United States Air Force. In 1954, the University of Maryland School of Music was established under the College of Arts and Humanities in Tawes Hall. Additionally, Homer Ulrich became the first full-time band director and chairman of newly established school. Seen as the "founding father" of the Department of Music, he is memorialized in awards and with the Ulrich Recital Hall in Tawes Fine Arts Building dedicated in 1995. Hubert Henderson took over as director in 1955 and fully integrated integrated the marching and concert bands into the university's music performance and education programs.

Prior to H.R.H. Queen Elizabeth II's visit to campus in 1957, the university gave the band $10,000 to purchase new uniforms to be used at the football game she attended. This was her first and only American college football game.

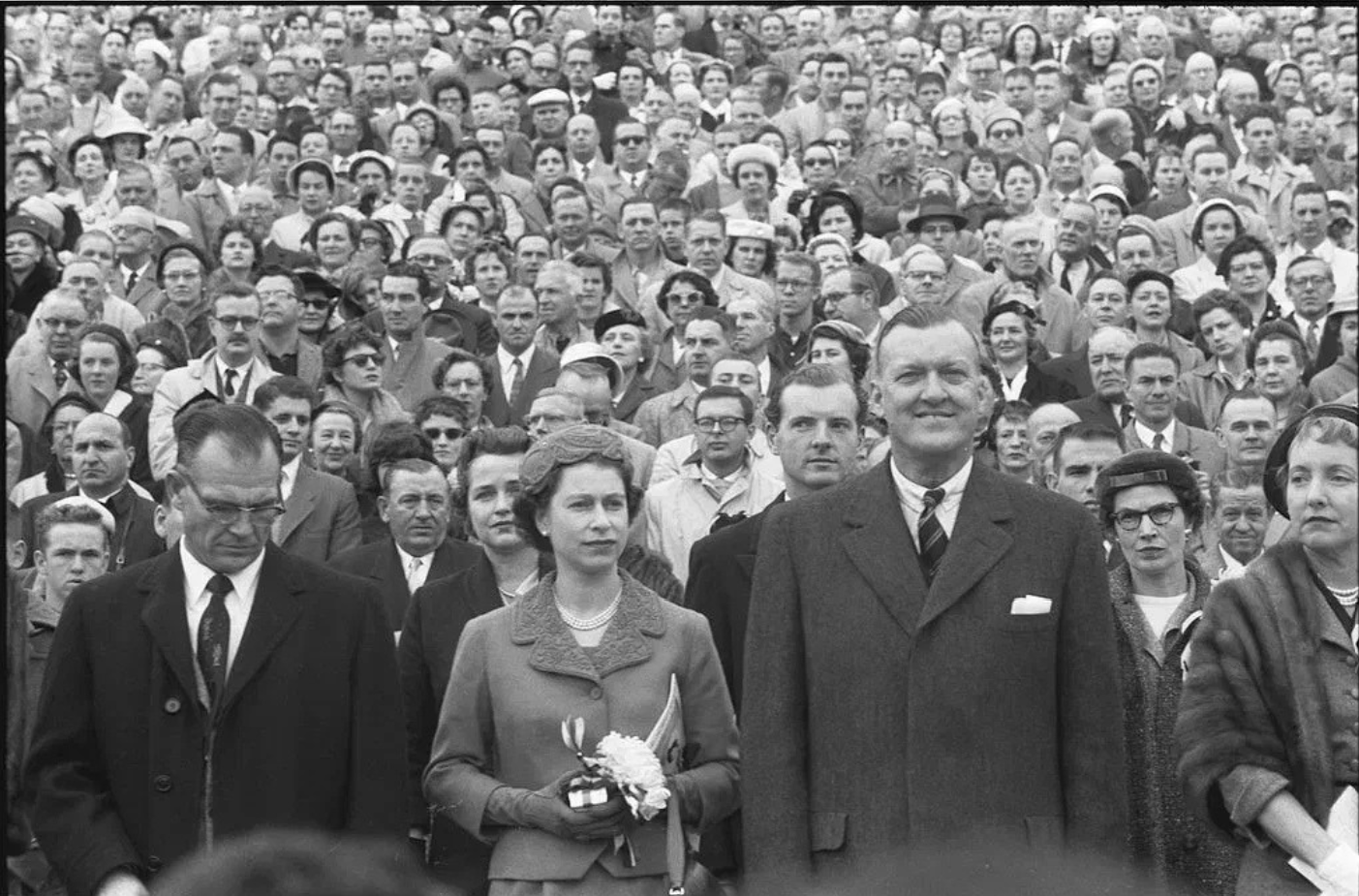
Queen Elizabeth II visits the United States pictured with Governor of Maryland Theodore McKeldin as the University of Maryland takes on the University of North Carolina in football.

Until 1965, the band's primary rehearsal space was the attic of the Reckord Armory which is a space the band still uses to store memorabilia and instruments. Henderson departed that same year with Acton Ostling Jr. becoming director from 1965-1968 and John E. Wakefield taking over later in 1968.

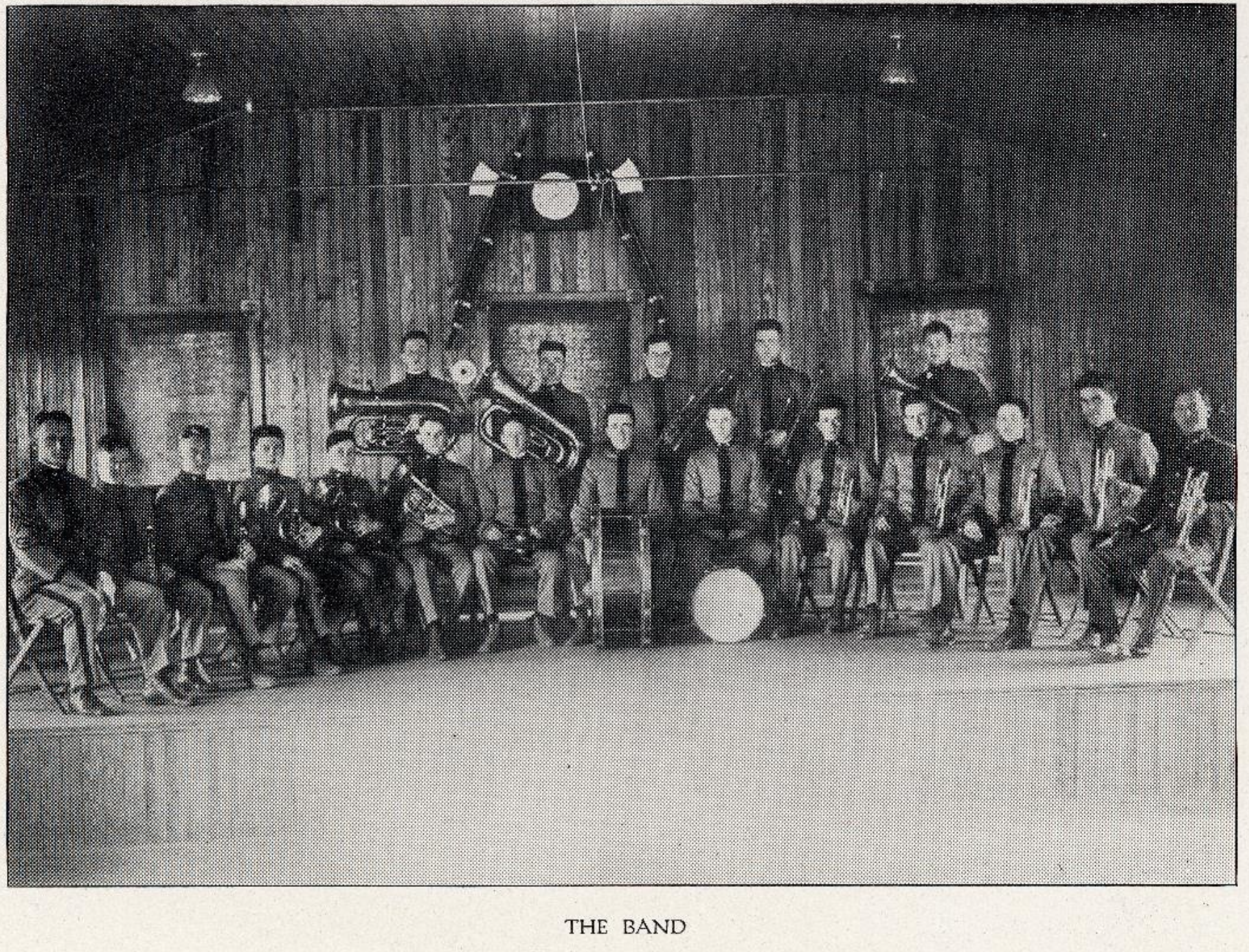
Maryland Agricultural College Cadet Band pictured in the attic of the Reckord Armory.

=== 1970-1989 ===
Under the direction of Wakefield, the marching band grew into a modern ensemble. Aided by associate directors Fred Heath, Jerry Gardner, Dieter Zimmer, and L. Richmond Sparks, the band modernized its formations and marching style laying the foundation for the current visual identity. The band had a major milestone in diversity when in appointing its first African-American Drum Major, Zemira Jones, from 1971-1973.

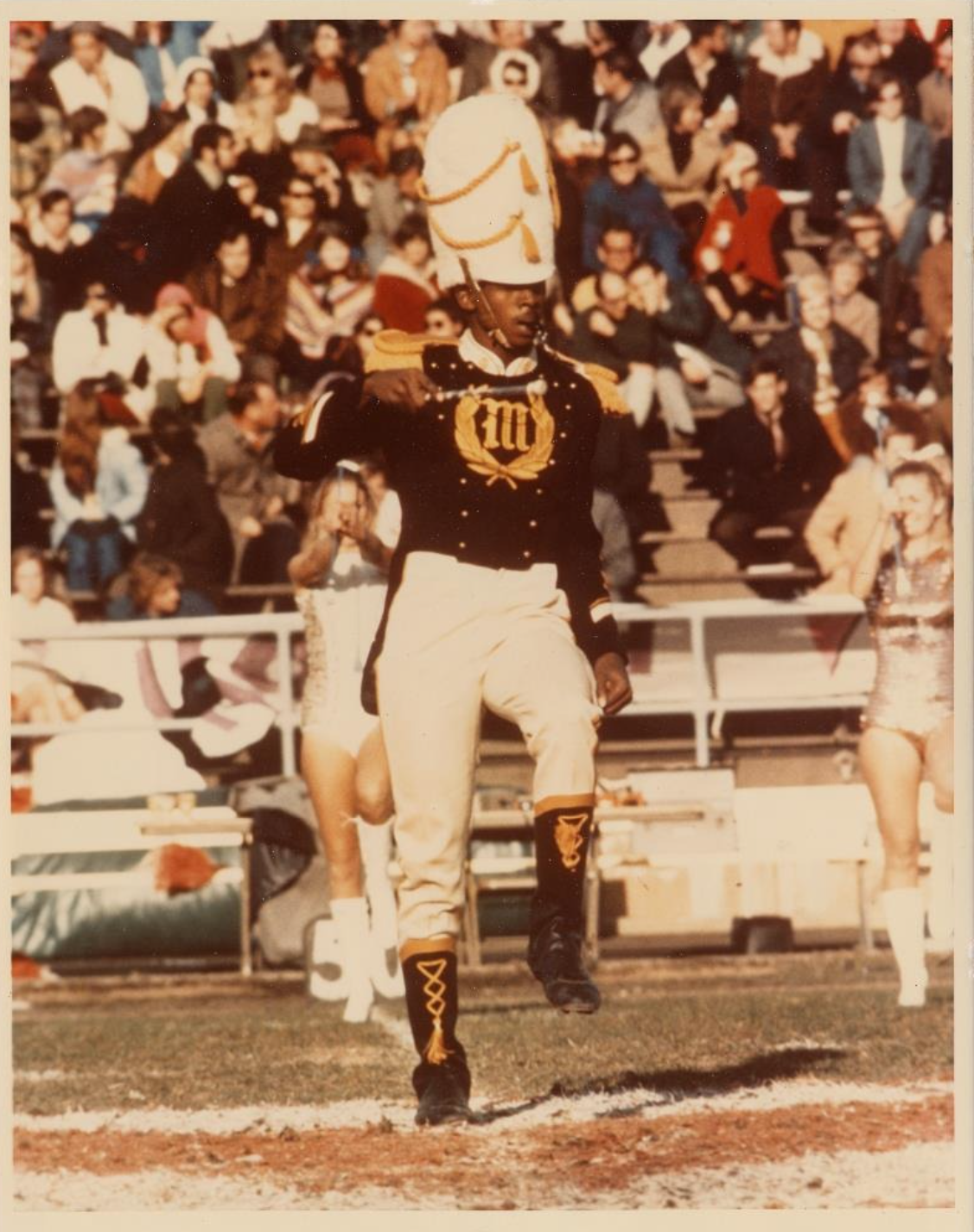
Zemira Jones served as the first African-American Drum Major of the band from 1971-1973.

=== 1990-2019 ===
The band performed in several nationally televised events in this era including the 2000 Macy's Thanksgiving Day Parade and the inaugural parade of former President Barack Obama in 2013. The year 2000 also marked the second identity change for the ensemble officially changing its name from the Big Red and White University of Maryland Marching Band to the Mighty Sound of Maryland.

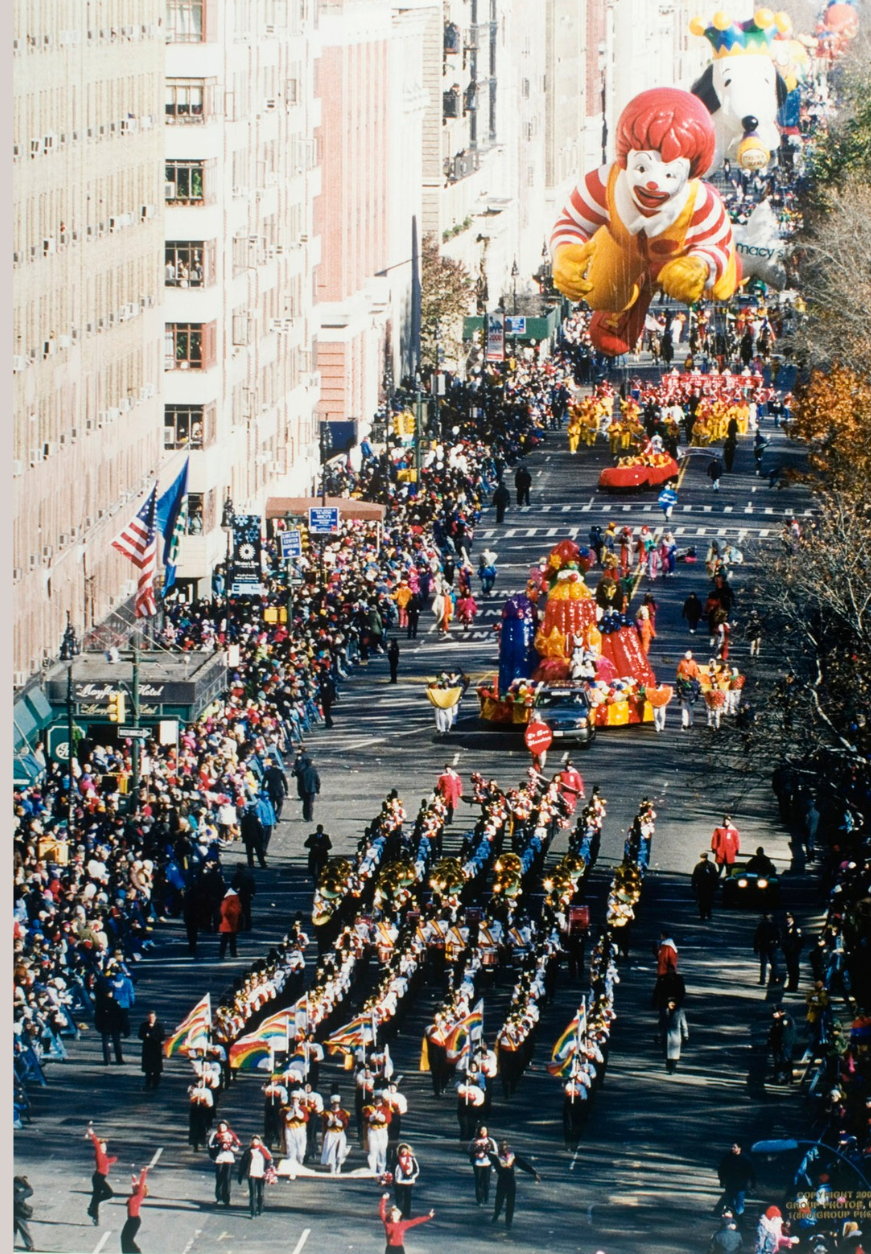
The Big Red and White Band performs in the 2000 Macy's Thanksgiving Day Parade

In August 2000, the bands moved from their primary home of Tawes Fine Arts Building into the then-new Clarice Smith Performing Arts Center. In September 2001, the new band room was dedicated to John E. Wakefield, Director of Bands.

During Early Week of 2006, band director L. Richmond Sparks introduced the idea of a volunteer trip to New Orleans to the band. The idea was met with much enthusiasm and excitement, and on September 9, 2006 the band played a New Orleans Tribute halftime show. After finishing on the field, each member of the band took to the stands to collect donations in their shakos to help fund a service trip to New Orleans over winter break. In the third quarter of the game over $25,000 was raised. By the end of the semester, over $50,000 had been raised to fund the band's trip. Following the Champs Sports Bowl in December 2006, the Mighty Sound of Maryland traveled from Houston, Texas to New Orleans, Louisiana. Over 240 members of the band spent a week building houses with Habitat for Humanity at the Musicians' Village Project. While in Louisiana, the band also performed for Habitat for Humanity volunteers, at Gallier Hall for the mayor, and at the Krewe of Alla's Mardi Gras kickoff parade in Gretna, Louisiana.

In 2010, the Mighty Sound of Maryland won CBS's Hawaii Five-0 theme song contest, gaining a prize of $25,000 for the band program. Part of their recorded performance of the theme was also aired on CBS during the show. The band was able to purchase new uniforms with their winnings.

In 2014, the Maryland Terrapins and the band joined the Big Ten Conference, home to bands widely considered to be some of the nation's finest. The bands directors expressed hope that the move would generate both additional exposure and funding for the band.

=== 2020-present ===
In 2023 the Mighty Sound of Maryland debuted new uniforms for the first time since joining the Big Ten Conference in 2014. The new design takes inspiration from other Big Ten uniforms with a peaked cap and pointed jacket as well as prominently incorporating the Maryland flag on the back.

Today, the Mighty Sound of Maryland is led by Dr. Andrea Brown and continues to perform and travel as the flagship representative of the University of Maryland.

In May 2026, after a search for a new Assistant Director following Dr. Craig Potter's departure, the School of Music announced the appointment of Dr. Kevin Niese to the Assistant Director role, effective August 2026. Dr. Niese earned his doctorate in Music Education from the University of Iowa and served as a Graduate Teaching Assistant for the Hawkeye Marching Band.

== Organization ==
=== Instrumentation and sections ===
The Mighty Sound of Maryland utilizes a standard instrumentation typical of a large Big Ten marching band. The woodwinds consist of piccolos, clarinets, alto saxophones, and tenor saxophones. The brass section features trumpets, mellophones, trombones and baritones (KAOS), and tubas. The percussion consists of a traditional drum corps style battery including snare drums, tenor drums, bass drums, and cymbals.

In addition to the instrumentalists, the band features a large visual ensemble. This includes a color guard performing with flags, the Maryland Dance Team, and feature twirlers.

=== Leadership structure ===
The success of the Mighty Sound of Maryland heavily relies on a leadership structure that bridges the gap between university faculty, band staff, and student representatives. Currently, the program is overseen by one Director, one Assistant Director, one drumline instructor, one color guard instructor, one dance team coach, and the Band Office. Additional instructional staff are often brought in to assist during Early Week as well. This group manages the music selection, drill design, and handles various administrative duties. They are supported in these tasks by Graduate Assistants.

Within the undergraduate student body, three drum majors serve as the primary liaisons between the section leadership and band staff and faculty. The drum majors conduct the band on the field and in the stands along with various instructional duties. Essential operational and promotional support is provided by two teams of student staff. The equipment (EQ) staff manages all uniforms and instruments as well as any repairs they might need throughout the season. They also handle setting and cleaning rehearsal spaces. The marketing staff produces content to promote the bands image and serve to grow the bands image.

Each section includes a student leadership team as well, with one section leader and several squad leaders. The responsibility of the section leader is focused around music and ensuring all members have their music memorized. The responsibility of a squad leader is focused on marching technique and drill.

=== Digital presence and community outreach ===
As the band's role as an ambassador for the university as evolved, so has its digital footprint. The Mighty Sound of Maryland maintains a social media presence on Instagram, Facebook, and YouTube as a method of engaging with fans, alumni, and prospective students, These platforms are used to broadcast performances, provide behind-the-scenes content, and promote band-sponsored events and philanthropy.

In addition to the primary band accounts, individual sections maintain their own more targeted digital outreach efforts using Instagram. Section and Squad Leaders typically take on the responsibility of generating content for these pages.

== Early Week ==
Before the start of each fall semester, all band members arrive on campus approximately a week before the first day of classes for "Early Week", the rigorous preseason band camp. During this week students learn the fundamentals of marching technique, learn pregame drill, and begin rehearsing the season's first halftime show. A typical Early Week schedule consists of a two-a-day outdoor marching rehearsal (morning/evening) and music rehearsal (afternoon).

Towards the end of Early Week the band hosts a season preview, inviting family, friends, students, faculty, and professors to see the progress the band has made. Early Week remains a foundational element of the season that prepares the band for the physical and mental demands as the semester progresses.

As of 2023 the ensemble has transitioned from historic Chapel Field to turf surfaces for Early Week. Since the transition the band has utilized the Xfinity Center RecWell Fields, the varsity Turf Field, and SECU Stadium.

== Regular season operations ==
During the fall semester, the Mighty Sound of Maryland maintains a rigorous regular-season schedule. The band rehearses for two hours a day on Mondays, Tuesdays, Wednesdays, Thursdays (Drumline and Guard), and Fridays, with an additional Saturday rehearsal prior to home games. These weekly rehearsals take place at various locations across campus, primarily utilizing Varsity Turf Field, Chapel Field, and SECU Stadium.

Such a schedule is required for the band's performance schedule. For each new football game the band performs an entirely new set of music, drill, and choreography. Depending on the university's athletic calendar, the time to learn a show can vary from less than one week to upwards of four weeks of rehearsal time.

In addition to gameday performances, the band engages with the campus community with Campus Concerts. The Friday before three or four select home football games, always including the Friday before the homecoming game. The band processes from its rehearsal on Chapel Field to the steps of McKeldin Library to perform. Featuring school songs and popular tunes from throughout the season, Campus Concerts draw crowds of students, family, and alumni.

== Pregame show ==
The Mighty Sound of Maryland's pregame show is a hallmark of the gameday experience, featuring a nonstop sequence of traditional university songs and iconic formations. The performance begins with a double-time entrance from the west endzone which is immediately followed by the first of three cannon blasts and the playing of "Pregame Fanfare." The band then executes an 8-to-5 march across the field while playing the "Victory Song" transforming into a "Block M" spanning nearly the entire width of the field. As is Big Ten tradition, the Mighty Sound of Maryland turns back-field and plays the visiting teams respective fight song while marching to the "Star". The ensemble then turns back front-field to perform the United States Navy Edition of the "Star Spangled Banner" and the university's "Alma Mater." The band subsequently plays "A Toast to Maryland" while forming a script "UM," which transitions into the "Spellout" and "Fight Song" culminating in the formation of the "Script Terps" logo.

The climax of the pregame show occurs as the band transitions to the final song of the pregame show. The sequence begins with a 64 count scatter drill filled with choreographed chaos resolving into a tight block formation. This is followed by "The Shell", a set of double time pinwheel moves culminating in the shell formation. Immediately followed by the playing of William Walton's "Crown Imperial" as they march into the shape of Maryland. The Mighty Sound of Maryland holds the unique distinction as the only marching band in the Big Ten Conference and the former Atlantic Coast Conference to have cannon written into its on-field instrumentation during this song. Midway through the playing of "Crown Imperial" the university's dance team unfurls the world's largest Maryland state flag, measuring nearly 20 yards wide following the cannon blast.

In the past, the pregame show prominently featured the former state song, "Maryland, My Maryland" played to the tune of "O Christmas Tree". However, the song was removed from the band's repertoire in the fall of 2017 following the violent white supremacist rallies in Charlottesville, Virginia. The song had previously drawn widespread criticism for its pro-Confederate origins, including lyrics that referred to former President Abraham Lincoln as "despot" and Union soldiers as "Northern scum." After a dialogue between director Eli Osterloh, the Athletic Department, and the university President, the piece was officially pulled from the pregame show and replaced with "A Toast to Maryland."

== Halftime ==
Throughout the football season, the Mighty Sound of Maryland performs one halftime show per home football game on the athletics schedule. The band's repertoire is highly diverse featuring drill and musical arrangements that span a wide variety of genres. These include contemporary pop hits, classic rock, Go-Go, and Broadway Show Tunes among many others. These shows are developed before the season begins by the band office with input from the previous seasons members.

Halftime performances also frequently feature on-field collaborations. The band routinely performs alongside the university Dance Team and Feature Twirlers. Other recent collaborations have included the university's Steel Pan Ensemble, local artist Mawty Maw, Rare Essence, and various dance groups. The band also hosts large scale collaborative events such as the annual High School Band Day and Alumni Band on Homecoming, where large groups upwards of 300 guest musicians join the ensemble on the field.

Following the conclusion of every home game, the band takes the field one last time to perform a "Fifth Quarter" postgame show for fans who remain in the stadium typically consisting of selections from the games' halftime show along with school songs.

== In the stands ==
During the game the band serves as a primary catalyst for crowd energy and engagement. Located in section 12 of SECU Stadiums' lower bowl, the band performs school songs and popular tunes to accompany offensive drives, defensive stops, and timeouts. The "Victory Song" composed by Thornton W. Allen in the late 1920s is played following successful field goals and extra points, while the "Fight Song" is played following a Maryland touchdown. For kickoffs the band plays Holst's "Mars, Bringer of War".

The band's repertoire includes a variety of popular pieces as well, with some of the staples including

- "Take on Me" by A-ha
- "Teenage Mutant Ninja Turtles" theme song
- "O' Fortuna" from Carmina Burana
- "Seven Nation Army" by The White Stripes
- "Freedom" by Beyonce
- "Swag Surfin'" by Fast Life Youngstaz.
- "I'll Be Around" by CeeLo Green and Timbaland

The band also develops past halftime show songs into stand tunes such as "Danza Kuduro" by Don Omar and Mowtownphilly by Boyz II Men.

The Amen Chorus is played at the end of victories at sporting events attended by the Mighty Sound of Maryland and Maryland Pep Band. It was discontinued in the late 1980s, but has been revived since. The tradition was originally revived for night on January 11, 2017, when the Pep Band played at a men's basketball game, in honor of Coach Lefty Driesell. It was permanently revived again to honor Driesell after his death in 2024.

Rock and Roll Part II was played following touchdowns and other big plays to energize the crowd. Due to the student section's improvised lyrics - and the university's concerns about sportsmanship and its image - the band was forbidden from playing the song at all football and basketball games in 2004. The tradition returned in 2023 however it is not played by the band.

The Bone Cheer is performed by KAOS, the trombone and baritone section, typically in the third quarter. The cheer involves the section alone playing a song and the rest of the band yelling "Go! Fight! Win!" Once the cheer ends, the Tenor Sax Challenge begins, in which tenor saxophone players hold up their instruments from the base using only one hand for as long as they can. Another KAOS cheer is performing the "Hallelujah Chorus" from Handel's Messiah.

== Traditions and student life ==
=== The Truck ===
Dating back to the 1950s, "The Truck" is the primary cadence of the Mighty Sound of Maryland and serves as one of the band's most celebrated gameday traditions. Played by the drumline as the band marches throughout campus, the parade known as "The Truck" or "Truck" alerts fans to the band's arrival. While the drumline maintains the beat, each section in the band has its own chant and choreography. The Truck route brings the band directly through campus tailgates amplifying school spirit before kickoff. Starting in the 2025 season, the band expanded this tradition by making an appearance at Jones Hill House to perform during the Maryland football FanFest. For the 2026 season due to changes in the gameday traffic pattern the Truck has added an additional stop at the Samuel Riggs IV Alumni Center Legacy Plaza.

=== Campus culture and organizations ===
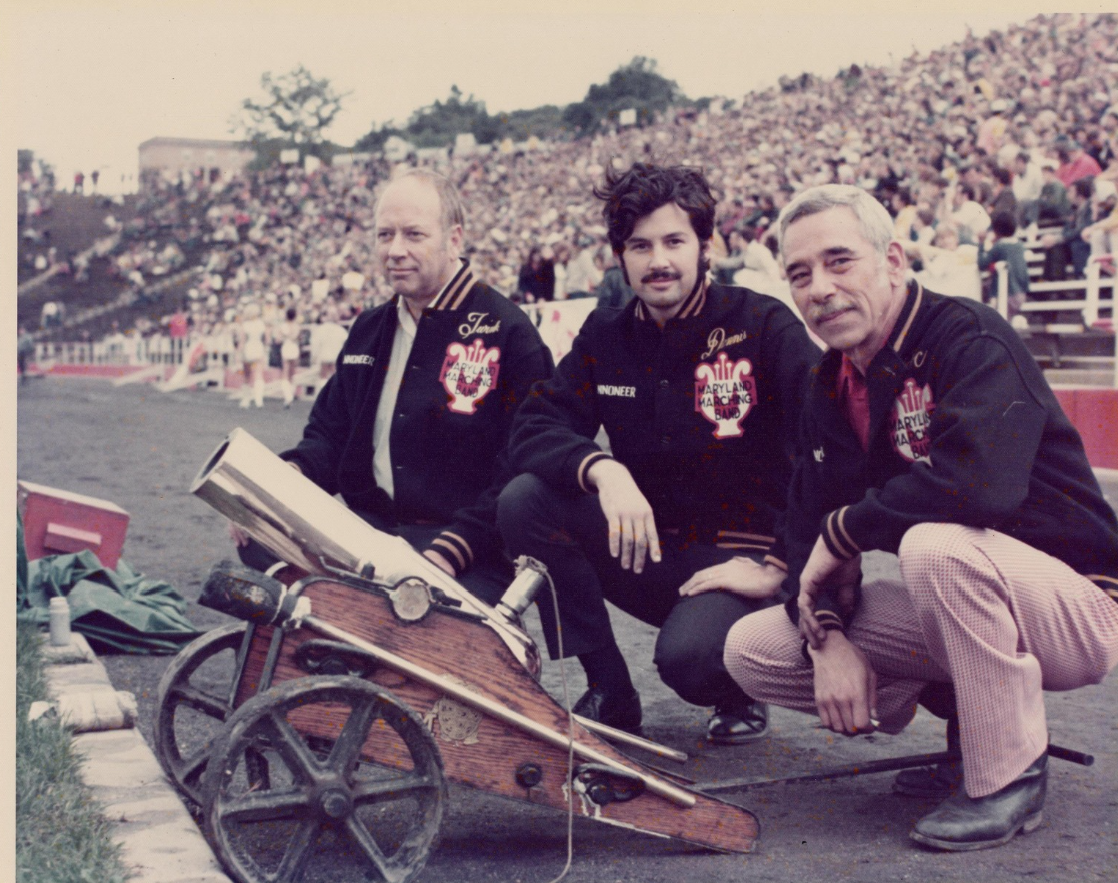
Original Mighty Sound of Maryland Canoneers

In addition to the truck, the Mighty Sound of Maryland maintains a deep culture of student and alumni-run traditions. In 1961, Leland "Twink", Dennis Cook, and "Doc" Rappleet started the tradition of firing a cannon, specifically a Lyle Gun at football games. This historical artifact paved the way for the band's modern use of cannon fire as a musical element.

The band's student culture is highly active and encourages diverse academic pursuits. Student organizations within the band manage digital outreach, organize section traditions, and preserve the history of their section and the band.

=== Greek life ===
The Mighty Sound of Maryland is closely supported by several active chapters of national music fraternities and sororities that play a major role in the band's logistical operations and philanthropic initiatives.

Tau Beta Sigma (TBS) is the honorary band service sorority and Kappa Kappa Psi (KKPsi), the honorary band service fraternity. Along with requiring a certain number of service hours, these organizations work together to provide additional support to the student staff and promote a positive band culture both in and out of uniform.

The band also has relationships with Phi Mu Alpha (PMA) and Sigma Alpha Iota (SAI) which are the social fraternities and sororities for men and women respectively. These Greek organizations provide an outlet for students to explore musical culture, leadership, and service within the Clarice Smith Performing Arts Center and the university as a whole.

== Gender dynamics and controversies ==
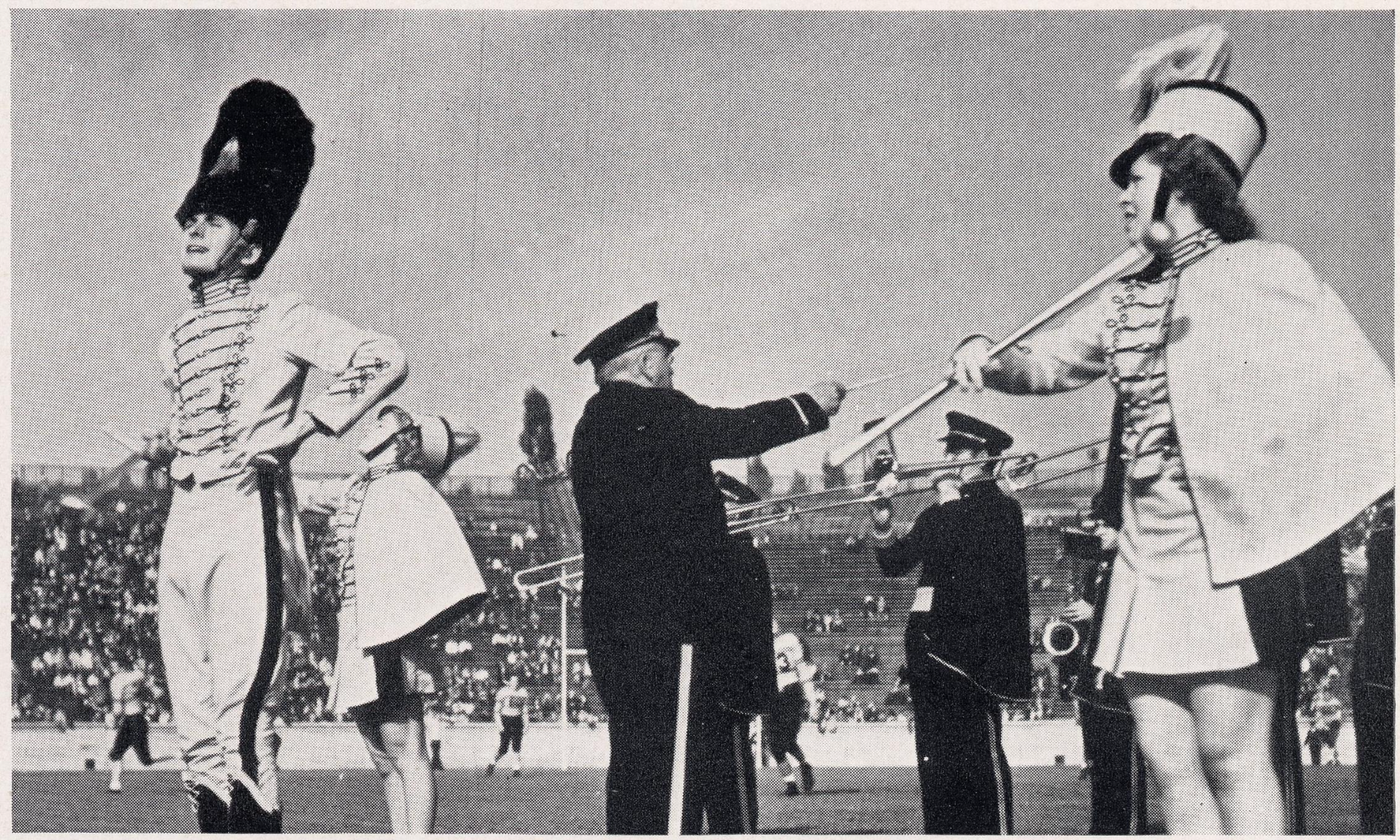
The First Majorettes of the Cadet Band.

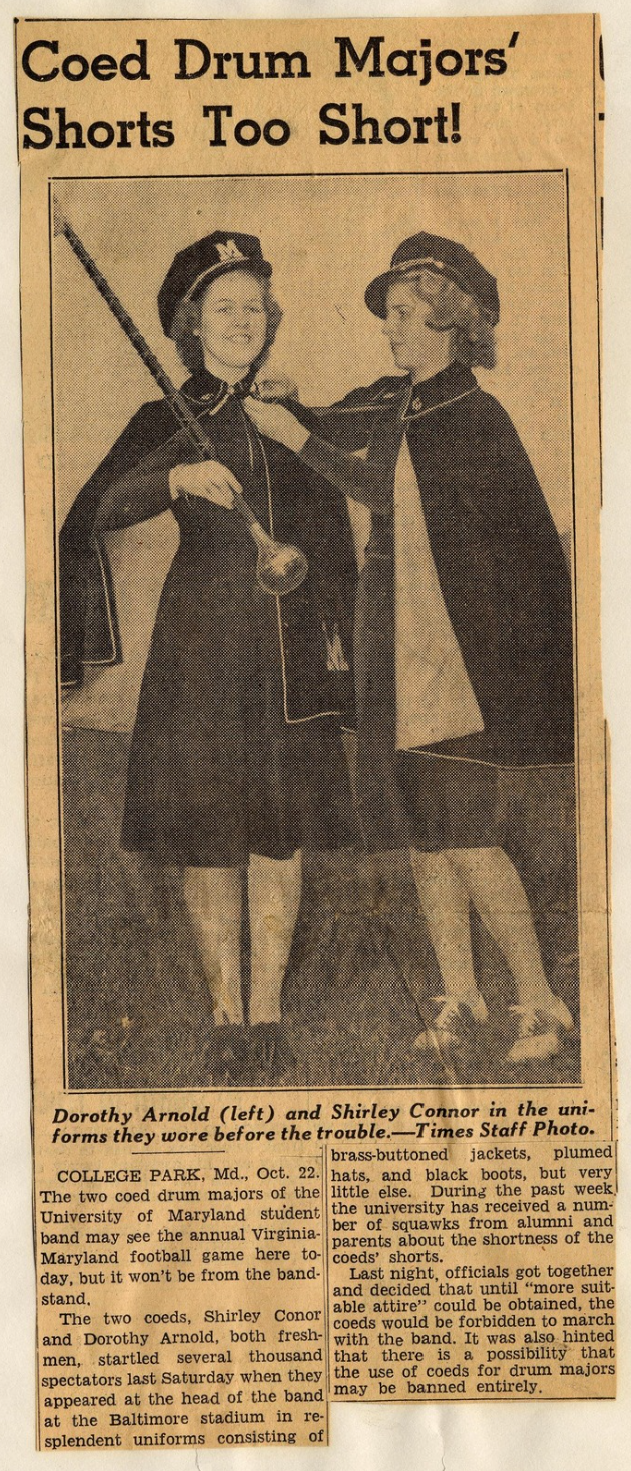
Washington Times Criticize Coed Drum Majorette Uniforms

The introduction of women into the band occurred in phases and was initially met with public controversy. Women were first allowed to join the band in 1937 when Misses Long, Beach, and Beane became members of the trumpet section. The following year Dorothy Arnold and Shirley Conner became the first Drum Majorettes. However, their uniforms were not received well as an article in the Washington Times states they "consisted of brass-buttoned jackets, plumed hats, and black shorts, but very little else." The article goes on to say that "until 'more suitable attire' could be obtained coeds were forbidden to march" and that it was possible "the use of coeds for drum majors may be banned entirely."

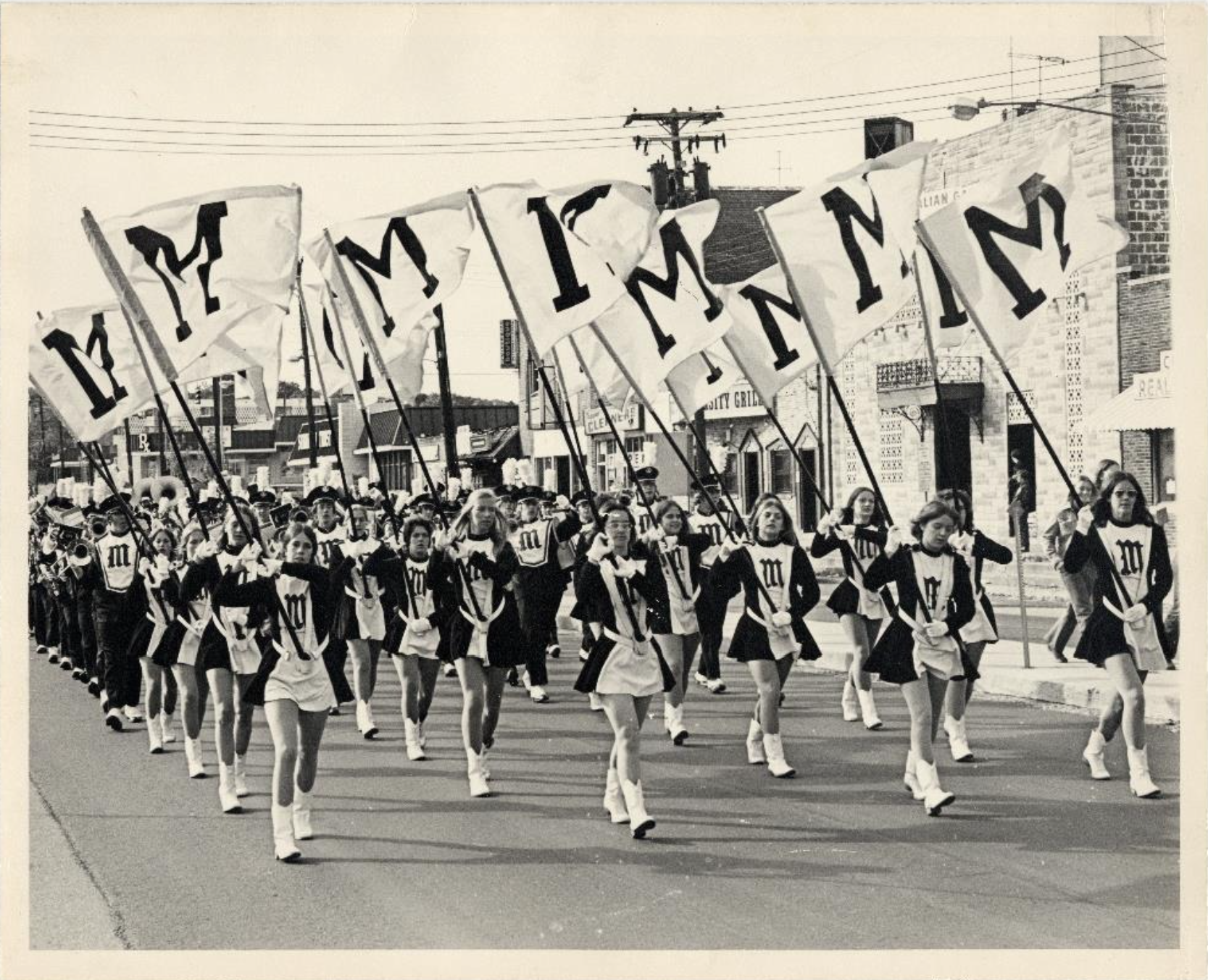
Maryland Agricultural College Cadet Band Color Guard

While women were eventually fully integrated into the color guard units, the marching band experienced periods of resistance to female marchers. This included a temporary ban on women marching in the 1960s, a decision influenced by the traditional mid-western style of marching bands of that era. Today, the band is fully integrated and has celebrated several notable gender inclusion milestones such as having several female drum majors and its first female director, Dr. Andrea Brown.

In recent years, the band has committed additional efforts to fostering an inclusive and welcoming environment for all members by requiring an anti-hazing and Title XI training during Early Week. These measures were instated as they currently stand in response to several serious incidents within the university Greek life community. As the largest student organization at the university, the band strives to be a "Mighty Family" for all.

== Maryland Pep Band ==
While technically a separate organization from the Mighty Sound of Maryland, the Pep Band is very closely related to the marching ensemble and serves as the primary ensemble for non-football sports. As these two organizations are very closely related, they share many of their members, traditions, and repertoire.

Based primarily in the XFINITY Center, the pep band performs at all mens and womens home basketball games. The group is instrumental in creating the hallmark home-court advantage the XFINITY Center is known for giving terrapin basketball. Playing all of the traditional school songs the band also plays songs like "Da Butt", "Takin' Out the Side of Your Neck", and "Party Medley". Party Medley was originally played for the halftime show of the 1987 meeting between the Maryland Terrapins and Miami Hurricanes. After the 2002 FedEx Orange Bowl in against the Florida Gators lyrics were added referencing the loss the Terrapins sustained.

During postseason basketball, the pep band will travel with the team to perform at the Big Ten Conference Tournament and NCAA March Madness Tournament. Beyond basketball, members of the pep band provide musical support for other varsity sports, including women's volleyball, women's soccer, baseball, and softball.

== Past directors ==
Year	Past Directors	Historical Context	Modern MSOM Year
1908-27	Levi G. Smith	The first director of the newly formed Maryland Agricultural College Cadet Band.	MSOM1-MSOM20
1928-46	Sgt. Otto Siebeneichen	He was a retired director of the U.S. Army band and was the first full-time director on the university faculty.	MSOM20-MSOM39
1947-49	Frank V. Sykora	A graduate of the Imperial Russian Conservatory who grew the band to over 100 members and started traveling extensively.	MSOM40-MSOM42
1950-53	Warrant Officer Robert L. Landers	Conductor of the "Singing Sergeants, " he led the band when New Byrd Stadium first opened.	MSOM43-MSOM46
1954	Homer Ulrich	He was hired as the first full-time band director to also be a member of the newly established Music Department faculty.	MSOM47
1955-65	Hubert Henderson	Integrated the marching and concert bands into the university's music performance and education programs.	MSOM48-MSOM58
1965-68	Acton Ostling Jr.	Took over as Director of Bands after serving as Associate Director under Henderson.	MSOM58-MSOM61
1968-1984	John E. Wakefield	Led the band through significant modern expansion. The band room located in the Clarice Smith Performing Arts Center was officially dedicated to him in 2001.	MSOM61-MSOM77
1984-2015	Dr. L. Richmond Sparks	Currently stands as the longest serving director of the band at 31 years, Dr. Sparks was a central figure in shaping the modern Mighty Sound of Maryland. He led the band in many notable parades including inaugurations for former President Ronald Reagan (1985), former President Barack Obama (2013), the 2000 Macy's Thanksgiving Day Parade. Dr. Sparks also oversaw the bands volunteer trip to New Orleans after Hurricane Katrina in 2006.	MSOM77-MSOM107
2015-2018	Eli Osterloh	Served as the Interim Director following Dr. L. Richmond Spark's retirement.	MSOM108-MSOM111
2018-present	Dr. Andrea E. Brown	She is the current Director of the Mighty Sound of Maryland, Director of Athletic Bands, and Associate Director of Bands at the University of Maryland. Dr. Brown made history in 2018 becoming the first female director to ever lead the band and the second female marching band director in the Big Ten Conference.	MSOM111- Present
