= Kim Min-ji =

- Hangul: 김민지
- RR: Gim Minji
- MR: Kim Minji

Kim Min-ji may refer to:

- Kim Min-ji (actress) (born 1992), South Korean actress
- Kim Min-ji (curler) (born 1999), South Korean curler
- Kim Min-ji (footballer) (born 2003), South Korean footballer
- Kim Min-ji (hurdler) (born 1996), South Korean track and field athlete
- Kim Min-jee (speed skater) (born 1986), South Korean short track speed skater
- Kim Min-ji (sport shooter) (born 1989), South Korean sport shooter
- Kim Min-ji (volleyball) (born 1985), South Korean volleyball player
- Minji (singer) (born Kim Min-ji, 2004), South Korean singer and member of the girl group NewJeans
- Peggy Gou, (born Kim Min-ji, 1991), South Korean DJ and record producer

== See also ==
- Kim Ji-min (disambiguation)
