= Christian kingdom =

Christian kingdom may refer to:

- Christian state, a country which endorses Christianity as the state religion
- Kingdom of Christ, one of the key elements of the teachings of Jesus in the New Testament of the Bible
- Theonomy, a hypothetical Christian form of government in which society is ruled by divine law
- Kingship and kingdom of God, a concept found in Abrahamic religions

== See also ==
- Kingdom of Heaven (disambiguation)
