= Big Six =

Big Six or Big 6 may refer to:

== Art, entertainment, and media ==
- Big six in the romantic literature of England, authors of romantic literature of England
- Big 6 Brass Band, a brass band from New Orleans, Louisiana
- "Big Six" (song), by Judge Dread, 1972
- Big Six wheel, a casino game
- The Big Six, a children's novel by Arthur Ransome
- The Big 6, a compilation of video games from the Dizzy series for the Amiga CD32
- Big 6 (album), an album by Blue Mitchell
- The six major film studios until 2019: Universal, Paramount, Warner Bros., Disney, Sony Pictures, & 20th Century Fox
- The six major US terrestrial TV networks until 2006: NBC, CBS, ABC, Fox, The WB, & UPN
- The current six national US terrestrial TV networks: NBC, CBS, ABC, Fox, The CW, & Ion Television

== Business and industry ==
- Big Six auditors, a group of accounting firms, so called from 1989 to 1998, that has since been reduced to the Big Four
- Big Six energy suppliers, the six largest electricity and gas suppliers in the United Kingdom
- Big Six (law firms), in Australia prior to 2012
- Big 6, New York Local #6 of the International Typographical Union

== Organizations and movements ==
- Big Six (activists), leaders of major organizations in the civil rights movement within the United States in the 1960s
- Big Six (Ghana), six Ghanaian nationalists jailed by the British colonial government in 1948
- Supreme War Council, nicknamed "the Big Six", military advisory council to the Emperor of Japan from 1903 to 1945

== Sports ==
- Big6 Baseball League, a Japanese College Baseball league competition, one of the oldest sport leagues in Japan.
- BIG6 European Football League, an American football cup competition for club teams
- Big 6 Hockey League, in Saskatchewan, Canada
- Big Six (endurance racing), a term to refer to six of the biggest endurance motor races
- Big Six (ice hockey), the nickname for the six top-ranked men's ice hockey national teams
- Big Six (Premier League), a term to refer to six of the most successful Premier League clubs
- Big Six cricket dispute of 1912, involving the "Big Six" Australian cricketers
- Big Six Junior College Conference, a junior college athletic conference with member schools located in Arkansas, Louisiana, Oklahoma, and Texas that operated from 1950 to 1954
- Big Six Conference, later the Big Eight Conference, an unofficial name for the Missouri Valley Intercollegiate Athletic Association from 1929 to 1946
- Big Six Conference, an unofficial name for the Northwest Conference (1908–1925)
- Big Six Conference, now known as the Pac-12 Conference, an unofficial name for the Athletic Association of Western Universities from 1962 to 1964

=== Athletes ===
- Big Six, the nickname for Jason Estrada, professional boxer born 1980
- Big Six, the nickname for Christy Mathewson, a baseball pitcher from 1900 to 1916
- Big Six, a nickname for John "Big Train" Moody (1917–1995), American football player

== Transportation ==
- Big Six, nickname for the Mercedes-Benz M186 engine
- Big Six, 2-10-2 type locomotives purchased by B&O Railroad
- Big Six, Baltimore and Ohio class S locomotive
- Big Six, Western Maryland Railway's Shay locomotive #6, the last and second largest Shay produced
- Morris Big Six, a family of motor cars

== See also ==
- Big One (disambiguation)
- Big Two (disambiguation)
- Big Three (disambiguation)
- Big Four (disambiguation)
- Big Five (disambiguation)
- Big Seven (disambiguation)
- Big Eight (disambiguation)
- Big Ten (disambiguation)
- Big 12 (disambiguation)
- Big Hero 6 (film), an animated superhero fantasy-comedy film
