= Big Five =

Big Five may refer to:

== Animals ==
- Big Five game, the large African wild animals said to be most difficult to hunt: lion, leopard, rhinoceros, elephant and Cape buffalo

== Arts and entertainment ==
- Big Five (Eurovision), the five main sponsoring countries of the Eurovision Song Contest: France, Germany, Italy, Spain and the UK
- Big Five Academy Awards, the five main award categories
- Big Five (orchestras), the traditional top five orchestras of the United States
- Big Five (Yu-Gi-Oh!), a group of fictional characters in the Yu-Gi-Oh! universe
- The "Big Five" largest UK ITV companies: History of ITV § The Big Four and Big Five
- Big Five (publishers) in English-language book publishing: Hachette, Holtzbrinck Publishing Group/Macmillan, Penguin Random House, HarperCollins and Simon & Schuster
- Toho's Big Five kaiju: Godzilla, Mothra, King Ghidorah, Rodan and Mechagodzilla
- Big Five (album), a 1972 album by Prince Buster
- Big Five, the national performing arts companies of Scotland
- The Five (composers), also known as the Mighty Handful, group of 19th century Russian composers
- The five major film studios until 2026: Universal, Paramount, Warner Bros., Walt Disney, and Sony
- Big Five television networks, the only five national, over-the-air television networks in the United States to have hit "major" status (NBC, CBS, ABC, the defunct DuMont, and Fox)
- The major five film studios of the studio system: MGM, Paramount, Warner Bros., 20th Century Fox, and RKO
- The Big Five international film festivals: Berlin, Cannes, Venice, Toronto, and Sundance

== Business ==
- Big Five (banks), the five largest banks in Canada
- Big Five (Hawaii), an oligarchy of five corporations that ruled over Hawaii
- Big Five (technology companies), a name given to Big Tech companies in the 2010s (Alphabet Inc. (Google), Amazon, Apple Inc., Meta Platforms (Facebook), and Microsoft)
- Big Five auditors, a group of accounting firms that have since been reduced to the Big Four
- Big Five auto shows: Detroit, Frankfurt, Geneva, Paris, Tokyo
- Big Five law firms, the five largest law firms of South Africa
- Big Five Software, 1980s game developer
- Big 5 Sporting Goods, a publicly traded (NASDAQ) sporting goods company
- The Big 5, the largest construction event in the Middle East, Africa and South Asia

== Government and politics ==
- Big Five (California politics), an informal institution of California's government
- Big Five (Germany), the five major metropolitan regions in Germany
- Big Five (Scotland Yard), a group of five senior Metropolitan Police detectives called upon to conduct investigations throughout Britain
- Big Five of Bayview, a group of political activists in the Bayview-Hunters Point neighborhood of San Francisco
- A colloquial name to refer to the five permanent members of the United Nations Security Council (United States, United Kingdom, France, China, Russia), or the five leading powers of the preceding League of Nations (United States, United Kingdom, France, Italy, Japan)
- Big Five (Labour Party), a group of five influential British Labour Party (UK) politicians in the First Shadow Cabinet of Ramsay MacDonald

== Sports ==
- Big Five (Argentine football), the leading teams of Argentine football
- Big Five (association football), the leading European markets in association football
- "Big Five" or Power Five conferences, a group of U.S. college sports conferences that are larger than the other "Group of Five conferences"
- Big Five Conference, a name used by the Athletic Association of Western Universities, now known as the Pac-12 Conference, from 1959 to 1962
- Philadelphia Big 5, an association of college athletic programs in and near Philadelphia, mostly referencing the basketball programs of said schools. Big 5 teams compete in the annual Big 5 Classic showcase.

== Science and technology ==
- Big5, a character encoding method for Traditional Chinese characters
- Big Five personality traits, a theoretical construct which describes human personality as organized along five dimensions or factors
- Big Five Weapons, five biological weapons developed by the United States Army
- The traditional five major extinction events during the Phanerozoic eon
- Big Five (arithmetic), five common subsystems of second order arithmetic in reverse mathematics
- Rule of big 5, an expansion of the rule of three in C++11

== Other uses ==
- Five Families, a group of crime families in New York, United States
- Oceanic Big 5, a project for cleaning up the oceans

== See also ==
- Big One (disambiguation)
- Big Two (disambiguation)
- Big Three (disambiguation)
- Big Four (disambiguation)
- Big Six (disambiguation)
- Big Seven (disambiguation)
- Big Eight (disambiguation)
- Big Ten (disambiguation)
- Big 12 (disambiguation)
