= Big Ten (disambiguation) =

The Big Ten Conference is a collegiate athletic conference in the United States.

Big Ten may also refer to:

- Big Ten Network, American sports network
- Big Ten Tournament (disambiguation)
- The Big 10, a mixtape by 50 Cent
- "Big Ten", a song by English reggae musician Judge Dread

== See also ==
- Big One (disambiguation)
- Big Two (disambiguation)
- Big Three (disambiguation)
- Big Four (disambiguation)
- Big Five (disambiguation)
- Big Six (disambiguation)
- Big Seven (disambiguation)
- Big Eight (disambiguation)
- Big 12 (disambiguation)
