= Tezza =

Tezza is a surname. Notable people with the surname include:

- Cristóvão Tezza (born 1952), Brazilian novelist and university professor
- Luigi Tezza (1841–1923), Italian Roman Catholic priest
- Marco Tezza (born 1964), Italian pianist
