= Big Seven =

Big Seven or Big 7 may refer to:

== Sports ==
- Big Seven (1938–1946), an unofficial name of the Skyline Conference, also known as the Mountain States Conference
- Big Seven Conference, later the Big Eight Conference, an unofficial name for Missouri Valley Intercollegiate Athletic Association
- Major one-week stage races (cycling), group of seven cycling races sometimes called the "big seven stage races"

== Other uses ==
- Big 7, an earlier name of the Big 8, a group of online newsgroup hierarchies
- Big Seven, a 1993 release from The Supernaturals
- Big Seven (United States), an influential group of US nonprofits for state and local government officials
- "Big Seven" (song), a 1972 song by Judge Dread
- Big Seven Group or The Combined, a Prohibition-era criminal organization on the East Coast of the United States
- Big Seven Ski Trail, a trail of Meagher County, Montana, U.S.
- The seven national TV networks until 2006: NBC, CBS, ABC, Fox, The WB, UPN, & Pax

== See also ==
- Big Seven Conference (disambiguation)
- Big One (disambiguation)
- Big Two (disambiguation)
- Big Three (disambiguation)
- Big Four (disambiguation)
- Big Five (disambiguation)
- Big Six (disambiguation)
- Big Eight (disambiguation)
- Big Ten (disambiguation)
- Big 12 (disambiguation)
