= Big Eight =

Big Eight or Big 8 may refer to:

== Sports ==
- Big Eight Conference, a former American college athletic association
- Big 8 Conference (California), an American college conference in the California Community College Athletic Association
- Big 8 Conference (Missouri), an American high school athletic association in Missouri
- Big Eight Conference (IHSAA), an American high school athletic association in Indiana
- WIAA Big Eight Conference, an American high school athletic association in Wisconsin

== Other uses ==
- The Big Eight, an Irish showband fronted by Brendan Bowyer
- Big 8 (Usenet), a group of Usenet newsgroup hierarchies
- Big 8 Beverages, a Canadian soft drink company
- Big Eight auditors, a group of accounting firms that have since been reduced to the Big Four
- Big Eight film studios, a group of American film studios during Hollywood's "studio system": MGM, Paramount, Warner Bros., 20th Century Fox, RKO, Columbia, Universal, & United Artists
- CKLW, a Canadian Radio station formerly known as The Big 8
- "Big Eight", a song by English reggae musician Judge Dread

== See also ==
- Big One (disambiguation)
- Big Two (disambiguation)
- Big Three (disambiguation)
- Big Four (disambiguation)
- Big Five (disambiguation)
- Big Six (disambiguation)
- Big Seven (disambiguation)
- Big Eight Conference (disambiguation)
- Big Ten (disambiguation)
- Big 12 (disambiguation)
