= The Heavenly King =

The Heavenly King or variation may refer to:

- The Heavenly Kings, a 2006 Hong Kong film about the Four Heavenly Kings
- Heavenly Kings (चतुर्महाराज), the Four Heavenly Kings in Buddhism
- Heavenly King or Tian Wang (天王), a title in Chinese culture
- King of Heaven, a type of deity, a sky god

== See also ==
- Four Heavenly Kings (disambiguation)
- Kingdom of Heaven (disambiguation)
