= Big One =

Big One, or The Big One may refer to:

== Earthquakes ==
- An anticipated megathrust earthquake along Western North America, the Philippines, or Japan:
  - Nankai megathrust earthquakes
  - Cascadia subduction zone#Megathrust earthquakes
  - San Andreas Fault#The next "Big One"
  - Marikina Valley fault system#Threat

== Arts and entertainment ==
=== Fictional characters and items ===
- Sōkichi Bamba/Big One, a fictional character in J.A.K.Q. Dengekitai
- "The Big One", the fake heart attack that Redd Foxx would regularly have on the television series Sanford and Son
- Big One, a locomotive from the anime series The Galaxy Railways
- "The Big One", nickname of the Big Score, the final heist mission in Grand Theft Auto V

=== Films ===
- The Big One (film), 1998, by Michael Moore
- The Big One, a 1995 TV film starring Rik Mayall
- The Big One, 2005, starring Yangzom Brauen
- The Big One: the Story of TGR's 16 Years in Jackson Hole, a 2006 ski documentary by Teton Gravity Research
- The Big One: The Great Los Angeles Earthquake, a 1990 made-for-television movie starring Joanna Kerns

=== Television ===
- The Big One (TV series), an early-1990s comedy series starring Sandi Toksvig and Mike McShane
- "The Big One" (Gilmore Girls), a third-season episode of the television series Gilmore Girls
- "The Big One" (Dexter), a 2010 episode of the television series Dexter

=== Music ===
==== Albums ====
- The Big One (Daddy Freddy album), 1994, by ragga vocalist Daddy Freddy
- Big Ones (Aerosmith album), a 1994 compilation album by Aerosmith
- Big Ones (Loverboy album), a 1989 compilation album by Loverboy
- The Big One (Rayvanny album), 2024, by Tanzanian singer Rayvanny

==== Songs ====
- "Big One", single by Judge Dread, Lemon, Hughes 1973
- "The Big One" (George Strait song), 1994
- "The Big One" (Black song), 1988
- "The Big One", by Nellie McKay from her album Pretty Little Head
- "The Big One", a 1998 single by Confederate Railroad
- "The Big One", an instrumental theme by Alan Tew used in The People's Court television show

=== Other uses in arts and entertainment ===
- The Big One (roller coaster), in Blackpool Pleasure Beach
- "The Big One", nickname given to Red Nose Day 2007, a fundraising event organised by Comic Relief
- "The Big One", a slogan used by WLW (AM), a radio station in Cincinnati, Ohio
- Big One for One Drop, a poker tournament featuring the largest buy-in events

== Other uses ==
- The Big One (motorsport), phrase describing a crash usually involving five or more cars in stock car racing
- World War II
- The Big One, a 2023 protest by activist group Extinction Rebellion

== See also ==
- Little One (disambiguation)
- Big Two (disambiguation)
- Big Three (disambiguation)
- Big Four (disambiguation)
- Big Five (disambiguation)
- Big Six (disambiguation)
- Big Seven (disambiguation)
- Big Eight (disambiguation)
- Big Ten (disambiguation)
- Big 12 (disambiguation)
