= Louis Faurer =

American photographer (1916–2001)

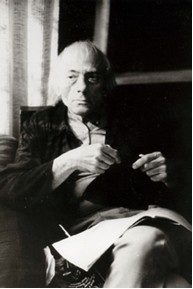
- Faurer shot by Lafferty, Burkewood Rd Hartsdale, 1971
- Born: August 28, 1916; Philadelphia, Pennsylvania
- Died: March 2, 2001 (aged 84); New York City
- Known for: Photography

Louis Faurer (August 28, 1916 – March 2, 2001) was an American candid or street photographer. He was a quiet artist who never achieved the broad public recognition that his best-known contemporaries did; however, the significance and caliber of his work were lauded by insiders, among them Robert Frank, William Eggleston, and Edward Steichen, who included his work in the Museum of Modern Art exhibitions In and Out of Focus (1948) and The Family of Man (1955).

== Life and career ==
Growing up in Philadelphia, Faurer showed an early aptitude for illustration. He bought his first camera in 1937 from the photographer Ben Somoroff. After a couple of jobs as a photographic technician, Faurer made his way to Manhattan and into the world of fashion photography. He quickly made contacts that stood him in good stead: Robert Frank, with whom he shared a darkroom/studio and fast friendship, and Walker Evans, whom he'd long admired, who introduced him to Alexander Liberman at Vogue.

Faurer did fashion photography for Vogue, Junior Bazaar, Harper's Bazaar, Mademoiselle, Elle, and Glamour, as well as assignments for Life and Look for more than twenty years. He complained that his work at Life involved too much travel, so he quit in the early 1950s. Most of the prints and negatives of his fashion work have probably been discarded, as Faurer stored them with a friend when he left the country in the late 1960s, then failed to reclaim them.

It is Faurer’s personal work from the 1940s, 1950s, and 1960s for which he is best remembered. He photographed the streets of New York City and Philadelphia, capturing the restless energy of urban life. His photographs show the great variety of the city's human face. As Robert Frank said in 1994:

Faurer ... proves to be an extraordinary artist. His eye is on the pulse [of New York City] - the lonely "Times-Square people" for whom Faurer felt a deep sympathy. Every photograph is witness to the compassion and obsession accompanying his life like a shadow. I am happy that these images survive while the world keeps changing.

Faurer experimented with blur, grain, double exposures, sandwiched negatives, reflections, slow film speeds, and low lighting. His 1950 photographs of Robert Frank and his new wife Mary at the San Gennaro Festival in New York are a case in point, exploiting maximum-aperture shallow depth of field, reflections and halation of out-of-focus light sources for intimate, romantic results. One of the series attracted the attention of curator Edward Steichen who included it in the world-touring Museum of Modern Art exhibition, The Family of Man, seen by 9 million visitors, and in its catalogue, which has never been out of print. As exacting in the darkroom as he was in the field, he was notorious for being a tireless perfectionist when it came to cropping and printing his work.

In the mid- and late 1960s Faurer experimented with hand-held 16 mm film, using Arriflex and Beaulieu movie cameras, filming in the streets of Manhattan, extending his still camera style into a cinematic medium.

Between 1969 and 1974 he lived and worked abroad, mostly in Paris. From the mid-1970s to the mid-1980s, Faurer taught at numerous art schools and universities, including the Parsons School of Design in New York City, Yale University, the University of Virginia in Charlottesville, The New School for Social Research and Stockton State College in New Jersey.

In 1984, while running to catch a New York city bus, Faurer was struck by a car and seriously injured. He never photographed again.

Faurer spoke of his “intense desire to record life as I see it” as his only motivation: “As long as I’m amazed and astonished, as long as I feel that events, messages, expressions and movements are all shot through with the miraculous, I’ll feel filled with the certainty I need to keep going.”

The late Walter Hopps, who was curator of American art at the Corcoran Gallery of Art and the Smithsonian's National Collection of Fine Arts, commented on Faurer's work:

I am in awe of the high point he can reach in a photograph such as Family, Times Square, at the center of New York in the center of our century. Perhaps no other American image stands comparison with Picasso’s Family of Saltimbanques, on their imagined European plane in 1905....Faurer stands and lives as a master of his medium.

== Publications ==
- Louis Faurer: Photographs from Philadelphia and New York, 1937-1973. College Park, Maryland: University of Maryland Art Gallery, 1981. Edited by Edith A. Tonelli and John Gossage. Curated and with texts by Faurer and Walter Hopps.
- Louis Faurer. Photo Poche. Paris: Centre national de la photographie, 1992. With an introduction by Martin Harrison and notes by Stuart Alexander.
- Tucker, Anne Wilkes, Louis Faurer. London/New York: Merrell Publishers, 2002. ISBN 0-89090-105-8
- Louis Faurer. Göttingen: Steidl; Paris: Henri Cartier-Bresson Foundation, 2016.

== Individual exhibitions ==
- Limelight, New York City, 1959. Faurer's first solo exhibition.
- Marlborough Gallery, New York City, 1977. Faurer's second solo exhibition.
- The Art Gallery at the University of Maryland, University of Maryland, College Park, MD, 1981.
- ZFF (Zentrum für Fotographie), Berlin, February 7 – March 27, 1998. Faurer's work from Philadelphia and New York under the direction of Henner Merle and photographer Hendrik Rauch.
- Museum of Fine Arts, Houston, January 2002; and traveled to the Addison Gallery of American Art, Phillips Academy, Andover, MA, May 4 - July 28, 2002; Museum of Photographic Arts, San Diego, CA, August 11 - October 20, 2002; Art Institute of Chicago, November 9, 2002 - January 26, 2003; Philadelphia Museum of Art, June 14 - September 7, 2003.
- Henri Cartier-Bresson Foundation, Paris, September 9 – December 18, 2016; Centro José Guerrero, Granada, April 6 – June 25, 2017. In 2016, Steidl and the Fondation published a book documenting the exhibition in French and English.
- Louis Faurer: New York Photographs, Weinstein Gallery, Minneapolis, February 10 - March 25, 2017.
- Louis Faurer, In Camera, Paris, October 5 - December 2, 2017.

== Awards ==
- National Endowment for the Arts grant
- Guggenheim Fellowship from the John Simon Guggenheim Memorial Foundation, 1979
