= Kim Ji-min =

- Hangul: 김지민
- RR: Gim Jimin
- MR: Kim Chimin

Kim Ji-min may refer to:

- Kim Ji-min (actress) (born 2000), South Korean actress
- Kim Ji-min (comedian) (born 1984), South Korean female comedian
- Kim Ji-min (footballer, born 1984), South Korean footballer
- Kim Ji-min (footballer, born 1993), South Korean footballer
- Kim Ji-min (illustrator) (born 1974), South Korean illustrator
