= Kiyo Tanaka =

Japanese picture book author and etcher

Kiyo Tanaka (田中 清代, Tanaka Kiyo; born 1972) is a Japanese picture book author and etcher.

== Biography ==
She was born in Kanagawa prefecture in 1972. She was very fond of drawing from an early age. She studied oil painting and print making at Tama Art University Painting Department.

In 1995, she won the UNICEF Award at the Bologna Children's Book Fair. Her first children's picture book Mizutama no Chiwawa (みずたまのチワワ, text by Arano Inoue) was published in 1997. Since then she has worked mainly on children's picture books including Okiniiri (おきにいり, 1997), Obakega kowai Kotoko-chan (おばけがこわいことこちゃん, 2000), Tomato-san (トマトさん, 2002), Nee dakko shite (ねえ だっこして, 2004) and The Little One (くろいの, 2018). She won the "Purple Island Award" at the Nami Island International Picture Book Illustration Concours in South Korea, the 25th Japan Picture Book Award Grand Prize in 2020 and the 68th Shogakukan Children's Publishing Culture Award for The Little One.
