= Big Four (universities) =

Top four universities in the Philippines

Map of the Big Four universities in Metro Manila (Note: Location showcased for the University of the Philippines is the flagship Diliman campus. All UP campuses are considered a part of the Big 4.)

The Big Four refers to the top four universities in the Philippines: the University of the Philippines (UP), Ateneo de Manila University (Ateneo), De La Salle University (DLSU or La Salle), and the University of Santo Tomas (UST or USTe). All four are located in Metro Manila, although UP is scattered across eight constituent universities in different parts of the Philippines. The four universities are regarded as the most prestigious in the country, with admission being highly selective. Additionally, the four universities are the largest members of the University Athletic Association of the Philippines, have long-established school rivalries, and are perennial champions in the league. Many influential figures in the Philippines, such as politicians, artists, engineers, and journalists, have studied at these universities. Graduates of the Big Four are seen as the most employable graduates of the country, with many companies preferring or prioritizing graduates from the four universities.

== Overview ==
The Big Four universities are seen as the most prestigious in the country. All four universities rank in the QS World University Rankings, the QS Asia University Rankings, and the Times Higher Education World University Rankings.

Nationally, all four schools rank at the top of national lists, and their graduates frequently top board exams in the country. The four universities also have the greatest number of Centers of Excellence and Centers of Development awarded by the Commission on Higher Education.

All four universities, with the exception of the nonsectarian public UP, are private research universities affiliated with the Catholic Church, with UST also having the distinction of being pontifical.

== List ==
Institution	Type	Locations	Founded	Rankings			Colors
Institution	Type	Locations	Founded	QS World 2027	QS Asia 2026	THE World 2027	Colors
Ateneo de Manila University	Private, Catholic (Jesuit)	Loyola Heights, Quezon City (Note: The university has satellite campuses in Makati and Pasig.)	1859	581	141	1001–1200	
De La Salle University	Private, Catholic (Lasallian)	Malate, Manila (Note: The university has satellite campuses located in Makati, Taguig, Laguna, and Batangas.)	1911	751–760	178	1801–2000	
University of the Philippines System	Public, National	UP Diliman: Diliman, Quezon City (Note: UP Diliman has a satellite campus in Taguig and operates extension programs in Pampanga.); UP Manila: Ermita, Manila; UP Los Baños: Los Baños, Laguna; UP Baguio: Baguio City, Benguet; UP Visayas: Miagao and Iloilo City, Iloilo; UP Mindanao: Davao City, Davao Del Sur; UP Cebu: Cebu City, Cebu; UP Open University: Los Baños, Laguna; UP Tacloban: Tacloban City, Leyte	1908	402	104	1201–1400	
University of Santo Tomas	Private, Catholic (Dominican)	Sampaloc, Manila (Note: The university has satellite campuses in General Santos and Laguna.)	1611	951–1000	184	1601–1800	

== Joint events ==
In 2024, the Ateneo Glee Club, the DLSU Chorale, the UP Singing Ambassadors, and the UST Singers performed together at the Saliw Lasalyano choral festival at the Teresa Yuchengco Auditorium of DLSU Manila. The four chorale groups performed compositions that included classic Original Pilipino Music (OPM) and gospel songs.

Moreover, the Philippines' Big 4 all participate in the University Athletic Association of the Philippines (UAAP), the premier collegial athletics association of the country.

== See also ==
- Battle of Katipunan, rivalry between Ateneo and UP
- Ateneo–La Salle rivalry
- La Salle–UST rivalry
- UP–UST rivalry
- Oxbridge, referring to the United Kingdom's oldest universities, Oxford and Cambridge
- Golden triangle, informal grouping of universities in London and southeast England
- Ivy League, formal grouping of elite older private universities in the United States
- Big Three, informal term grouping Harvard, Yale, and Princeton
- TU9, alliance of nine leading Technical universities in Germany
- Group of Eight, a group of Australia's top research universities
- National Institutes of Technology, 31 leading public engineering universities in India
- SKY, informal term grouping the three most prestigious universities in South Korea
- Imperial Universities, grouping of elite older universities in Japan
- Double First-Class Construction, funding schemes for universities in China
