= The Art Gallery at the University of Maryland =

Art museum in College Park, Maryland

Coordinates: 38°59′7″N 76°56′51″W

University of Maryland Art Gallery
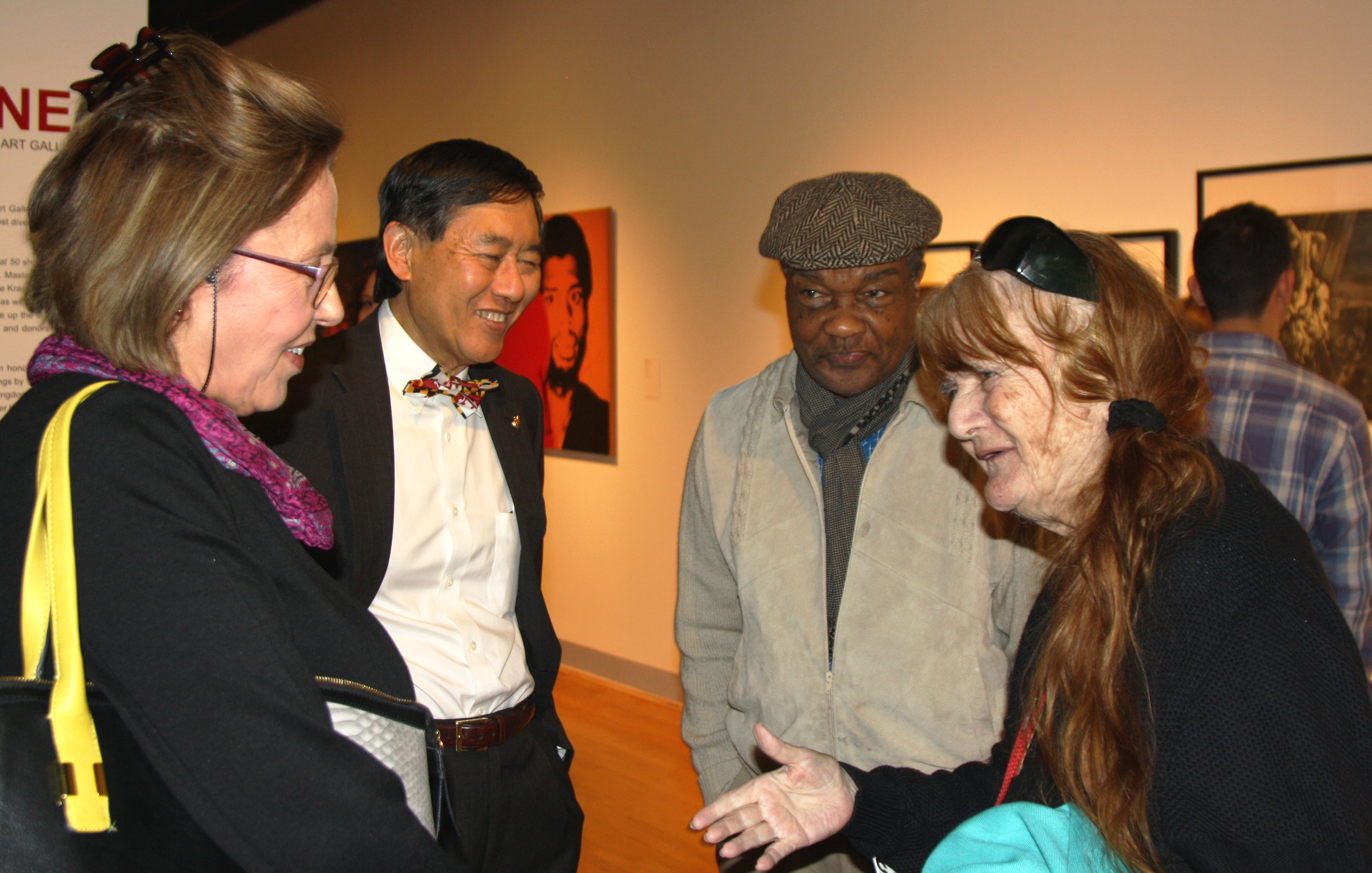
- Established: 1965
- Location: 2202 Parren J. Mitchell Art-Sociology Bldg., 3834 Campus Dr., College Park, Maryland
- Director: Taras W. Matla
- Website: artgallery.umd.edu

The University of Maryland Art Gallery is the flagship art museum on the campus of the University of Maryland, College Park. The Gallery is a member of the American Alliance of Museums, Association of Academic Museums and Galleries, and the National Art Education Association.

== History ==
Founded in 1965, the University of Maryland Art Gallery was initially housed in the Tawes Fine Arts Building before moving to a newly constructed exhibition facility in the Art-Sociology Building in 1976. On October 9, 2015, it was announced that the Board of Regents of the University System of Maryland (USM) unanimously approved the naming of the Art-Sociology Building to the Parren J. Mitchell Art-Sociology Building after the late Congressman.

== Collections ==
The Gallery's permanent collection contains nearly 3,000 objects including prints, drawings, paintings, sculptures, photographs and time-based media. Among the prominent artists who have had exhibits showcased at the Gallery are John Baldessari, Louis Faurer, Chip Lord, Conrad Marca-Relli, and Ian Hornak.
