= Big 12 (disambiguation) =

Big 12 may refer to:

- Big 12 Conference, a college athletic conference
- Big Twelve Conference (Illinois), a high school conference in Central Illinois
- Northern Illinois Big 12 Conference, a high school conference in Northeastern Illinois
- Big Twelve (Brazilian football) or G-12, a group of Brazilian football clubs

== See also ==
- Big One (disambiguation)
- Big Two (disambiguation)
- Big Three (disambiguation)
- Big Four (disambiguation)
- Big Five (disambiguation)
- Big Six (disambiguation)
- Big Seven (disambiguation)
- Big Eight (disambiguation)
- Big Ten (disambiguation)
