= Big Eight Conference (disambiguation) =

The Big Eight Conference was an NCAA Division I-A athletic conference that operated from 1907 to 1996.

Big Eight Conference may also refer to:

- Big Eight Conference (California), a junior college athletic conference that operated from 1950 to 1962
- Big 8 Conference (California), a junior college athletic conference
- Big Eight Conference (IHSAA), Indiana and Illinois, a high school athletic conference
- Big Eight Conference (Iowa), a defunct high school athletic conference
- Big 8 Conference (Missouri), a high school athletic conference
- Big Eight Conference (Wisconsin), Wisconsin, a high school athletic conference
