= Marco Tezza =

Italian pianist

Marco Tezza (born 1964 in Vicenza) is an Italian pianist.

== Biography ==
After a degree with honors in piano (1984), Tezza studied with Carlo Mazzoli, Jörg Demus, György Sándor, Bruno Canino and with Aquiles Delle Vigne at the Ecole Normale "Alfred Cortot" in Paris. Besides, he won the first prize in several international piano competitions: Città di Treviso, La Spezia, RAI, and received awards in other prizes: Moncalieri (European Prize for Chamber Music), Busoni, Pretoria and Viotti.

Tezza often performs in prestigious concert-halls in Europe, America, Africa and the Middle-East. Among them: La Fenice Theatre in Venice, Zurich Tonhalle, Salle Cortot in Paris, Musikhalle in Hamburg, Tawes Theatre in Washington, D.C. Villa Lobos Hall in São Paulo, Assembly Hall in Beirut.

He has held master classes at the "Université de S. Esprit" in Beirut, (where he is visiting professor), at the Victorian College of the Arts in Melbourne and in the University of South Florida.

Tezza, who holds also a diploma in violin, in 1994 founded the Stravinskij Chamber Orchestra which he conducted for several years.
In his career Marco Tezza has collaborated both as a soloist and as a conductor with several Chamber and Symphonic Orchestras, such as I Fiati della Scala, Accademia Bizantina, Orchestra Sinfonica Toscanini, Orchestra di Padova e del Veneto, Sofia Chamber Orchestra, Jeunesse Musicale Symphony Orchestra, Praga Symphony Orchestra, Sofia FM Young Radio Orchestra and many others.

Marco Tezza has been partner of Ughi, Brunello, Carmignola, Ashkenazy. He performs with Daniele Roccato (contrabass) and Massimiliano Pitocco (bandoneon) in the cross-over ensemble TrisTango, inspired from Ástor Piazzolla's Tangos.

Tezza teaches piano at the Conservatory A. Pedrollo in Vicenza.

== Recordings ==
He recorded several LPs and CDs for labels such as Balkanton, Klingsor, Velut Luna, OnClassical and AS Disc.
