= Big Two (disambiguation) =

Big two is a card game of Chinese origin.

Big Two may also refer to:

- Big Two derby, the Northern Irish football derby between Linfield and Glentoran
- Big Two (tennis), the rivalry between Carlos Alcaraz and Jannik Sinner
- Big two of North Region Junior football: Sunnybank F.C. and Banks O' Dee F.C.

== See also ==
- Big One (disambiguation)
- Big Three (disambiguation)
- Big Four (disambiguation)
- Big Five (disambiguation)
- Big Six (disambiguation)
- Big Seven (disambiguation)
- Big Eight (disambiguation)
- Big Ten (disambiguation)
- Big 12 (disambiguation)
