= Kim Ji-min (illustrator) =

South Korean illustrator

- Born: Chungju City
- Occupation: Illustrator, print maker
- Language: Korean
- Genre: Picture books

Website
- www.jiminkimpicturebook.com

Kim Ji-min (Korean: 김지민) is a South Korean picture book illustrator, author and print maker. Her best-known works include Hyde & Seek and The Seven Hours Itch.

== Career ==
Kim won the Books New Talent category as well as the Overall Winner New Talent at the UK Association of Illustrators AOI World Illustration Awards with Hyde & Seek. She also won the Purple Island Award at the Nami Concours in 2017 and the BIB Golden Apple the same year with Hyde & Seek. She participated in a seminar held during the BIB in 2019, and presented her views on picture books as objects of art. Hyde & Seek was invited to join Le immagini della fantasia 37, an exhibition touring five cities in Italy in 2019.

== Awards ==
- 2016 The AOI World Illustration Award, Overall New Talent and Book category for Hyde & Seek
- 2017 The Nami Island International Picture Book Concours Purple Island award for Hyde & Seek
- 2017 The Biennial of Illustrations Bratislava Golden Apple Award for Hyde & Seek

== Works ==
- 2017 The Seven Hours Itch (Hand crafted)
- 2017 Hyde & Seek (HANSOL SOOBOOK PUBLISHING CO)ISBN 9791170281122

== Activities ==
- 2020 Participated in the group exhibition Picturebook: Play & Link at Dongdaemun Design Plaza DDP Design Week
- 2019 Hyde & Seek invited to join Le immagini della fantasia 37, an exhibition touring five cities in Italy
- 2019 Presented "The Picture Book as an Art Object" at a seminar held during the Biennial of Illustration Bratislava (BIB)
- 2018 Conducted the workshop, "Creating Three-Dimensional Books of Self-Portraiture with Author Kim Ji-min," at the Kurume City Art Museum in Japan
- 2018 Touring exhibition of award-winning works at the Biennial of Illustration Bratislava (BIB) of five Japanese cities, including the Kurume City Art Museum, Nara, and Chiba
- 2018 Exhibition by invitation, The Picture Book as an Art Object, at the Kwanjeong Library Small Gallery, Seoul National University Central Library
- 2017 Solo exhibition, The Picture Book as an Art Object, GalleryMEME
- 2017 Participated in the Tokyo Art Book Fair in Japan
- 2017 Participated in the Seoul Illustration Fair
- 2017 Participated in the Codex Book Fair in San Francisco, U.S.A.
- 2016 AOI World Illustration Awards, exhibition at Somerset House, London
- 2016 AOI World Illustration Awards, Books category, New Talent Overall Winner
- 2015 Participated in the London Illustration Fair
