= The Little One (book) =

Children's picture book by Kiyo Tanaka

The Little One (くろいの, Kuroino; "The Black Thing") is a children's picture book by Kiyo Tanaka, published in 2018 by Kaiseisha. David Boyd wrote the English translation, published in 2021 by Enchanted Lion Books.

The book involves a little girl who sees a creature and goes on an adventure with it, before meeting her father at the end of the book.

It was published in French, as La petite chose noire, with translation by Alice Hureau.

== Reception ==
The book and its author won the "Purple Island Award", of Nami Island International Picture Book Illustration Concours 2019. It also won the Japan Picture Book Award 25th edition Grand Prize, and the Shogakukan Children's Book Publishing Culture Award.

Kirkus Reviews stated that for the most part the work is "poignant and engrossing narrative" although it argued the aspect of her going into a closet at the creature's request "gives serious pause".

Kimberly Olson Fakih of School Library Journal stated that the art style illustrates "a timeless quality."

Masao Higashi (東雅夫 Higashi Masao) of Asahi Shimbun gave a positive review, praising the "fine copper engraving technique".
