= The Chosen (Karabel book) =

The Chosen: The Hidden History of Admission and Exclusion at Harvard, Yale, and Princeton is a 2005 book by Jerome Karabel.
