= Four Heavenly Kings (disambiguation) =

The Four Heavenly Kings are the Buddhist protective deities.

Four Heavenly Kings may also refer to:

== Groups of four people ==
- Shitennō (Minamoto clan), 四天王, retainers of Minamoto no Yorimitsu
- Shitennō (Tokugawa clan), 徳川四天王, Japanese generals
- Four Heavenly Kings (Hong Kong), namely Jacky Cheung, Andy Lau, Leon Lai and Aaron Kwok
- Four Heavenly Kings (Taiwan), four Buddhists masters who founded prominent Buddhist organizations in Taiwan
- Kōdōkan Shitennō, 講道館四天王, notable judo competitors of the early Kōdōkan
- Mitsuharu Misawa, Kenta Kobashi, Toshiaki Kawada and Akira Taue, famous professional wrestlers from All Japan Pro Wrestling

== Groups of four fictional characters ==
- Shitennō, from the manga Sailor Moon
- Shitennō (The Four Generals of Mutsu), the four leaders of a large dog pack in the manga Ginga: Nagareboshi Gin
- The Four Heavenly Kings or Grand Masters of Shadaloo in the Street Fighter video game series
- The Elite Four, literally translated as Four Heavenly Kings, any of various teams of four Pokémon trainers in the Pokémon meta-series
- The Big Four, sometimes translated as the Four Heavenly Kings from the manga Bobobo-bo Bo-bobo
- The Four Heavenly Kings / Four Guardians of Neo Arcadia from the Mega Man Zero series
- The Four Heavenly Kings, in Ultraman Mebius, an association composed of 4 of the franchise's most powerful aliens
- The Four Heavenly Kings of Orochi from The King of Fighters
- Four Heavenly Kings is a group of four powerful Bishoku-ya in the manga Toriko
- The Elite Four, officially translated into English from Shitennō, from the anime Kill la Kill
- In Gintama, 3 different groups of people are called "the Four Heavenly Kings" (Shitennō)
  - The overlords of Kabukichō (yakuza, gambling and other activities): Doromizu Jirochou, Saigou Tokumori, Kada and Otose.
  - The young leaders of the last generation of Jouishishi rebels: Sakata Gintoki, Katsura Kotarou, Takasugi Shinsuke and Sakamoto Tatsuma.
  - The most skilled retainers of the Yagyuu clan: Toujou Ayumu and 3 minor characters (Kitaooji Itsuki, Nishino Tsukamu and Minamito Sui).
- Mazoku Shitennō, known as the Spice Boys in English, a collective of antagonists in the anime Dragon Ball Z.
- The Four Heavenly Kings are also represented in the anime and manga Toriko. Toriko and his three friends Coco, Sunny and Zebra are known as the "Four Gourmet Kings". They also have each have one of the five superhuman senses which Toriko has smell, Coco has sight, Sunny has touch, and Zebra has hearing.

== Films ==
- The Heavenly Kings, a 2006 film directed by Daniel Wu
- Detective Dee: The Four Heavenly Kings, a 2018 film directed by Tsui Hark

== See also ==
- The Heavenly King (disambiguation)
