= Big Seven Conference =

Big Seven Conference may refer to:

- Big Eight Conference, an unofficial name used in the 1948–1957 era
- Skyline Conference (1938–1962) (officially the Mountain States Athletic Conference and also known informally as the Mountain States Conference), an unofficial name used in the 1938–1947 era
