= Big Eight Conference (Iowa) =

Former Iowa High School athletic conference

The Big Eight Conference was a high school athletic league in Iowa made up of some of the largest schools in the state.

== Members ==
- Ames
- Cedar Falls
- Fort Dodge
- Marshalltown
- Mason City
- Newton
- Waterloo East
- Waterloo West

== History ==
The Big Eight Conference was formed in 1963 when Des Moines North and Des Moines East left the old Big Six Conference to compete in the Metropolitan Conference. The league's four remaining members (Fort Dodge, Mason City, and the Waterloo schools) reached out to other large schools in central Iowa to rebuild the conference. Cedar Falls joined from the Northeast Iowa Conference and Ames, Marshalltown, and Newton joined from the Central Iowa Conference. The conference became known as the Big Nine Conference when Waterloo Central opened in 1972. The name would be changed back to the Big Eight Conference in 1988 when Waterloo Central, as part of a school district reorganization, was converted to a junior high school.

From the onset, the league was one of the strongest in the state. In its first year of competition, league schools captured state championships in four of the seven sports the IHSAA conducted championships for at the time. The league also claimed the first two 5-on-5 girls' basketball titles in state history (for many years the IGHSAU only sponsored 6-on-6 basketball). Among other notable achievements, the league also had a stronghold on the boys' cross country title for 12 years, winning a state title all but one year from 1964 to 1975.

The league was stable until the late 1980s when Newton and Ames left to join the Central Iowa Metro League. Soon after, the other members of the conference began looking for new homes. Marshalltown found a home in the CIML. Cedar Falls, Waterloo East, and Waterloo West then joined the Mississippi Valley Conference and Fort Dodge and Mason City, geographic outliers to among the rest of the state's largest schools, followed Marshalltown, Ames, and Newton to the CIML after being originally being declined membership in the league.

== State Champions ==
=== Ames ===
- Boys' Basketball: 1973, 1976, 1991
- Boys' Cross Country: 1967, 1968, 1973, 1975, 1983, 1989
- Boys' Golf: 1968, 1982, 1986
- Boys' Swimming: 1982
- Boys' Track & Field: 1964, 1965, 1968, 1971, 1972, 1980, 1986, 1987, 1988, 1989, 1990, 1991
- Girls' Golf: 1989
- Girls' Track & Field: 1981, 1987, 1988

=== Cedar Falls ===
- Football: 1986
- Boys' Cross Country: 1969
- Wrestling: 1968, 1976
- Girls' Golf: 1975
- Girls' Swimming: 1986

=== Fort Dodge ===
- Baseball: 1969
- Boys' Basketball: 1988
- Wrestling: 1980, 1985
- Girls' Basketball: 1985

=== Marshalltown ===
- Baseball: 1976, 1981, 1985, 1986
- Boys' Basketball: 1966
- Boys' Cross Country: 1964, 1965, 1966, 1974, 1975
- Boys' Track & Field: 1985
- Girls' Basketball: 1986

=== Mason City ===
- Baseball: 1972
- Football: 1978
- Boys' Cross Country: 1972, 1973
- Boys' Swimming: 1975, 1979, 1991
- Girls' Swimming: 1987, 1988, 1989

=== Newton ===
- Boys' Basketball: 1964
- Football: 1980
- Boys' Golf: 1990

=== Waterloo East ===
- Boys' Basketball: 1974, 1990
- Boys' Track & Field: 1979
- Wrestling: 1964, 1983

=== Waterloo West ===
- Baseball: 1991
- Boys' Cross Country: 1970
- Boys' Golf: 1971, 1972, 1973, 1977
- Boys' Tennis: 1991
- Boys' Track & Field: 1981
- Wrestling: 1965, 1966, 1967, 1969, 1971, 1972, 1977, 1989
- Girls' Golf: 1981
