= Big 6 Brass Band =

American brass band from New Orleans, Louisiana

- Origin: Treme, New Orleans, Louisiana
- Genres: Jazz, funk, R&B
- Years active: 2017-present
- Label: independent
- Members: Thaddeaus "Peanut" Ramsey; Clifton "Spug" Smith; Pierre Carter; Lamar Heard Sr.; Dwayne Finnie; Chadrick Honoré; Chris Paul Terro; Chris Cotton; Troy Albert Jr.; Louwell Mitchell
- Past members: Eric Gordon; Herman Brooks
- Website: bigsixbrassband.com

The Big 6 Brass Band is a New Orleans brass band. The group was founded in 2017 by members and alumni of some of the city's top brass bands including the Rebirth Brass Band, Hot 8 Brass Band, Stooges Brass Band, and To Be Continued Brass Band. Soon after their founding in 2017, the Big 6 became the most popular band on the streets, playing in almost every second line of the 2018–2019 season.

== Discography ==
In 2019, they released their debut album titled "Big Six." In Offbeat Magazine's review of the album, the band was heralded as "the sound of New Orleans streets today."

=== "Big Six" by Big 6 Brass Band ===
No.	Title	Length
1.	"After Party"	3:51
2.	"Baby Mama"	3:00
3.	"The Mind"	4:40
4.	"Twitter Feet"	5:23
5.	"Haters"	4:14
6.	"Bank Roll"	4:17
7.	"Go Down"	4:06
8.	"Lamar Song"	3:43
9.	"Legs & Thighs"	3:17
10.	"Footwerk"	4:01
11.	"Peedy Home"	3:44
12.	"Cruising"	3:44
13.	"On the Run"	3:59
