= Kingdom of Heaven =

Kingdom of Heaven may refer to:

== Religious ==
- Kingdom of Heaven (Gospel of Matthew)
  - Kingship and kingdom of God, or simply Kingdom of God, the phrase used in the other gospels
- Kingdom of Heaven (Daviesite), a schismatic sect, founded by William W. Davies, in the Latter Day Saint movement located near Walla Walla, Washington from 1867 to 1881

== Songs ==
- "Kingdom of Heaven", a song appearing on the 1966 album The Psychedelic Sounds of the 13th Floor Elevators by the 13th Floor Elevators
- "Kingdom of Heaven", a song by the band Epica, appearing on their 2009 album Design Your Universe

== Other uses ==
- Kingdom of Heaven (film), a 2005 film, directed by Ridley Scott
  - Kingdom of Heaven (soundtrack), a soundtrack album from the film

== See also ==
- The Heavenly King (disambiguation)
- Republic of Heaven, opposing concept developed by Philip Pullman in the His Dark Materials series of novels
- Holy Rus, the religious and philosophical concept close to the idea of Kingdom of Heaven, prevalent in Russia and central Eurasia
- Taiping Heavenly Kingdom
- Embassy of Heaven
