= Amala Education =

UK school for refugees

- Formation: 2016
- Type: Charity
- Headquarters: London, England
- co-CEOs: Mia Eskelund Pedersen; Polly Akhurst
- Website: https://www.amalaeducation.org/
- Formerly called: Sky School

Amala Education (previously Sky School) is a UK-based charity that provides high school education to refugees.

== Organisation ==
Amala Education is a London, England based charity that provides high school level education for refugees.

The organisation was founded in 2016 by Polly Akhurst and Mia Eskelund Pedersen, and was originally called Sky School. It is registered charity number 1181373 in England and Wales.

The learning is delivered to refugees through organisations working in refuges camps that are coordinated by the United Nations High Commissioner for Refugees, including in Kakuma refugee camp. In 2017, 60% of learning was delivered in person, 40% was delivered online.
