= The Big Three (video game) =

1989 video game

- Publisher(s): SDJ Enterprises
- Release: 1989

The Big Three is a 1989 video game published by SDJ Enterprises.

== Gameplay ==
The Big Three is a game in which Europe of 1939 to 1945 is the focus of a strategic-level wargame. The player is able to build units with the options for builds increasing based on how many cities that player controls. The game map uses large squares arranged in a hexagonal pattern for movement. Players are able to launch straightforward attacks against their opponents to try to create a breakthrough. Units representing entire armies, fleets and air forces. Breakouts are possible because there will always be at least one phase of attacking before supply units are destroyed. There are three game turns per year, in which players earn Military Points which can be spent to build units, conduct offensives or declare war.

== Reception ==
Alan Emrich reviewed the game for Computer Gaming World, and described Big Three as "a refined, evolved design that makes for a highly playable, intriguing and enjoyable simulation" although he felt that it was "a game in search of development, an artificial opponent and state of the art presentation."

Stuart Mitchell for Computer Games Strategy Plus said that play was "straightforward" while noting "the twist that the opposing player may intervene during the current player's turn" using air and naval intercepts.
