= Big Three (colleges) =

Historical term used in the United States to refer to Harvard, Yale, and Princeton

The Big Three
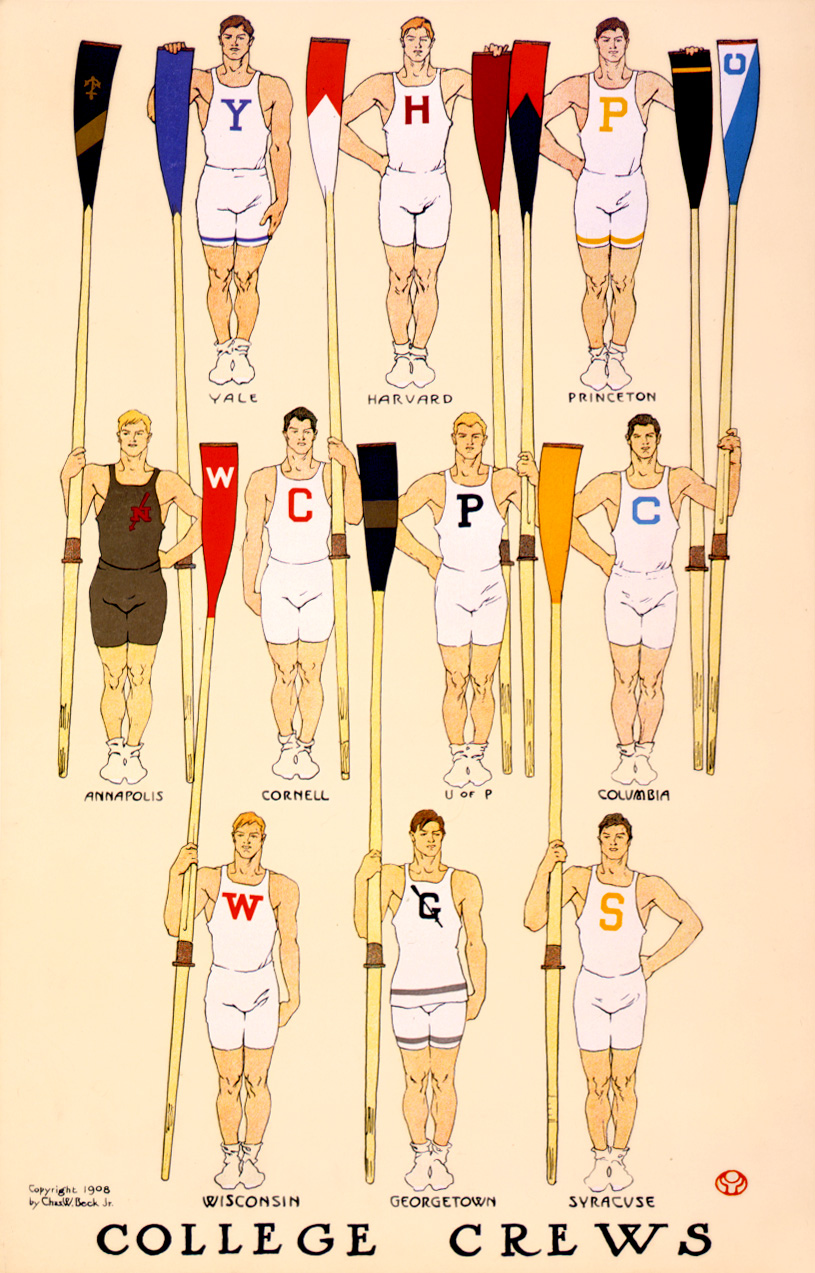
- Members rowing teams from ten colleges, including the Big Three in the top row. Illustration by Edward Penfield, 1908
- United States

Information
- Other name: HYP
- Type: University prestige; Tradition; Sports rivalry
- Established: 1880s
- Colors: (Harvard); (Yale); (Princeton)

Big Three and HYP (Harvard, Yale, Princeton) are historical terms used in the United States to refer to Harvard University, Yale University, and Princeton University. The phrase Big Three originated in the 1880s, when these three colleges dominated college football. In 1906, these schools formed a sports compact that formalized a three-way football competition which began in 1878, predating the Ivy League. The rivalry remains intense today, though the three schools are no longer national football powerhouses, and schools continue to refer to their intercollegiate competitions as "Big Three" or "Harvard-Yale-Princeton" meets.

== Historic status ==
In 1908, Scotsman Robert Knox Risk wrote the following about the state of American universities during the early 20th century.

Princeton, like [Harvard and Yale], confers some social distinction upon its graduates. In this respect Harvard, Yale, and Princeton are the Western Counterparts of Oxford and Cambridge, and are maintained largely for the sons of rich men. Members of the American aristocracy would send their boys to one or other of these three universities if there were any aristocracy in the United States.

Edward Digby Baltzell wrote: "The three major upper-class institutions in America have been Harvard, Yale, and Princeton." These colleges have, in the past, been set apart from others by a special historic connection with the White-Anglo-Saxon Protestant (WASP) establishment. Of the three, Princeton University was traditionally the preferred choice of the Southern upper class. While describing the recruiting process for the Rough Riders, Theodore Roosevelt, mentioned the Ivy League schools including Harvard, Yale, and Princeton as target schools.

We drew recruits from Harvard, Yale, Princeton, and many another college; from clubs like the Somerset, of Boston, and Knickerbocker, of New York; and from among the men who belonged neither to club nor to college, but in whose veins the blood stirred with the same impulse which once sent the Vikings over sea.

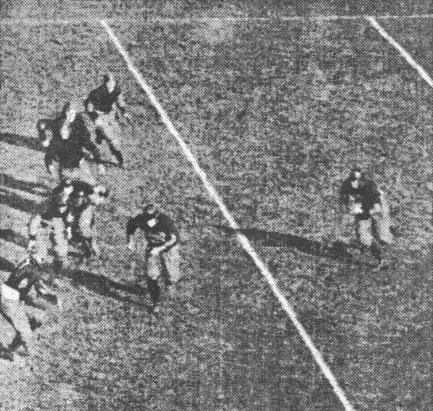
Harvard-Princeton Football Game, 1915

The Saturday Review found in 1963 that Harvard, Yale, and Princeton enrolled 45% of boys on the New York Social Register. That year Nathaniel Burt described the social prestige of the Big Three:

It is, above all, the national social prestige of the Big Three which is competition with the purely local social prestige of the University [of Pennsylvania]. Upper-class boys from all over the country, including Philadelphia, go to Harvard, Yale, and Princeton. Only from Philadelphia do upper-class boys go in any significant numbers to Penn. This is of course a universal national phenomenon. The pattern of upper-class male college preference, as deduced from a counting of noses in the various Social Registers, can be summed up as "The Big Three and a Local Favorite."

Burt continued, "Every city sends or has sent its Socially Registered sons to Harvard, Yale, and Princeton, in some preferred order, and to one local institution. This order varies. New York sets the pattern with Yale first, Harvard second, Princeton third, then Columbia. St. Louis and Baltimore are Princeton towns. Most other cities (Chicago, Cleveland, Cincinnati) are Yale towns. Only Boston, and occasionally Washington, are Harvard towns."

The connection between certain colleges and social ranking is old; Jerome Karabel, in a note citing Kenneth Davis, says that "in the mid-eighteenth century, the [president of Harvard] personally listed students when they enrolled, according to ... 'to the Dignity of the Familie whereto the student severally belong'—a list that was printed in the college catalogue and that determined precedence in such matters as table seating, position in academic processionals, even recitations in class." Ronald Story, however, says that it was during “the four decades from 1815 to 1855” that “parents, in Henry Adams′ words, began sending their children to Harvard College for the sake of its social advantages.”

A further intensification of the importance of the Big Three occurred during the 1920s; According to E. Digby Baltzell, “in a … managerial society, the proper college degree became the main criterion for potential elite status… it was during the [1920s] that certain institutions of high prestige, such as Harvard, Yale, and Princeton (and Stanford on the West Coast) became all-important as upper-class-ascribing institutions.” Not coincidentally, this was also the era when the Big Three became concerned by “the Jewish problem” and began instituting interviews, essays, and judgements of “character” into the admissions process. From the 1930s on, Big Three admissions became progressively more meritocratic, but still included non-academic factors such as “lineage.”

Ivy League schools including Harvard, Yale, and Princeton have in the past been regarded as the goals for many children in WASP circles. Some educators have attempted to discourage this fixation. Jay Mathews, author of Harvard Schmarvard, addresses seniors obsessed with Ivy League schools with the analysis: “It does not matter where you go to school, it matters what you do when you get there and what you do after you graduate.”

== Rankings ==
=== U.S. News & World Report ===
The "Big Three" schools: Harvard, Yale, and Princeton are often rated among the top three institutions in the National Universities category along with Stanford and Massachusetts Institute of Technology. Over the past 26 years ending with the 2026 rankings, U.S. News named as the best national university Princeton nineteen times, Harvard twice and the two schools tied for first five times.

== Economic diversity ==
As Jerome Karabel, a Harvard graduate and the author of The Chosen detailing the history of the admissions process at HYP, noted:

The Big Three are notoriously lacking one of [diversity's] most critical dimensions: class diversity. In a study of the percentage of low-income students in 2000 (as measured by the proportion of federal Pell Grants - need-based awards that do not have to be repaid and make up the bulk of many poorer students' aid) at the nation's leading universities, the Big Three were found to be among the nation's least economically diverse schools. Of the 40 universities studied, Harvard and Princeton ranked 39th and 38th respectively, with Yale at 25th. While the three top universities in economic diversity were all public institutions (the University of California at Los Angeles, UC-Berkeley, and UC-San Diego), the next two—the University of Southern California and New York University—were private. And one university in the top 10, California Institute of Technology, is among the most selective private institutions in the nation.

More recently, Harvard, Yale, and Princeton instituted no-loan financial aid policies which provide students with need-based aid from private funds held by the universities. This enables greater attendance from the poorer classes than Pell Grant statistics would indicate, since many recipients of university grants do not receive Pell Grants.

== As an athletic association ==
The athletic agreements among the three universities were first formalized in 1906, although their football teams had been engaging in three-way competitions, which newspapers had been referring to as "HPY," since 1878. (Princeton and Yale first played in 1873, Harvard and Yale in 1875, with Harvard and Princeton first meeting in 1877.) The Big Three teams had an outsized hold on popular culture as they dominated college football during its early formative years, when there were few competing spectator sports besides fledgling professional baseball teams. In 25 seasons spanning 1869 through the 1894 title for the University of Pennsylvania, the consensus national champion was either Princeton (16 titles), Yale (13) or Harvard (2). Football between Harvard and Yale was suspended for two years after the 1894 game in Springfield, Massachusetts was so violent that it was referred to as "The Springfield Massacre." Other sports including baseball and crew were suspended as well. The Big Three made further formal agreements in 1916 and 1923, and although in part they have now been superseded by the Ivy League, formed for football in 1945 and for other sports in 1954, the three universities still sponsor events that involve only themselves.

The first Big Three agreement in 1906 was the result of a conference on football called by President of the United States and Harvard alumnus Theodore Roosevelt in October 1905 as a result of deteriorating relations, caused once again by increasing violence of play, more recently between Harvard and Princeton. The agreement of June 1916, the Triple Agreement, was originally proposed by President and Princeton alumnus Woodrow Wilson in December 1909 out of a desire to reduce injuries, and took several years to come to fruition, resulting in common eligibility requirements. The Three Presidents' Agreement addendum of January 1923 covered financial arrangements, scouting and scholarships, among other things. In 1926, tensions arose once more after Princeton had shut out Harvard for three consecutive games by a cumulative score of 82-0. This led to a hiatus in games between Harvard and Princeton which caused Big Three competition to be suspended for eight years, although Yale continued to play both opponents during that period.

== Big four ==
Before the American Civil War, Union College was one of a "big four" along with Harvard, Yale and Princeton. Student attrition due to the Civil War and a scandal over college finances led to a decline at Union that caused it to lose ground and drop from the group.

== See also ==
- List of NCAA college football rivalry games
- Ivy League
- Little Ivies
- Little Three
- Maine Big Three
- Oxbridge
- Seven Sisters
- SKY (universities)
- C9 League (Chinese universities)
- Golden Triangle (English universities)
- Group of Eight (Australian Universities)
