= My Little One =

My Little One may refer to:

- My Little One (1933 film), an Italian drama film
- My Little One (2018 film), the working title for the Russian drama Ayka (Айка)
