= SKY (universities) =

Unofficial grouping and acronym for three universities in South Korea

Locations of 'SKY' universities in Seoul, South Korea

SKY is an informal grouping and acronym for three of the most selective and academically competitive universities located in Seoul, South Korea. It consists of Seoul National University, Korea University, and Yonsei University.

The term is widely used in South Korea, both in the media and by the universities themselves. Being admitted to one of the SKY universities is frequently seen as important to one's career and social position in the country. The acronym also implies that the universities are extremely difficult to get into (i.e., students are reaching for the sky).

== Members ==
Institution	Type	Location	Established	Academic staff	Undergraduate enrollment	Postgraduate enrollment	Rankings				
Institution	Type	Location	Established	Academic staff	Undergraduate enrollment	Postgraduate enrollment	QS World (2026)	ARWU World (2023)	THE World (2023)	THE Asia (2023)	QS Asia (2025)
Seoul National University	Public (National)	Sillim-dong, Gwanak-gu, Seoul	1946	2,278 (2022)	15,870 (2022)	12,394 (2022)	38	81	56	11	18
Korea University	Private	Anam-dong, Seongbuk-gu, Seoul	1905	1,511 (2022)	19,598 (2022)	9,847 (2022)	52	201–300	201–250	27	13
Yonsei University	Private	Sinchon-dong, Seodaemun-gu, Seoul	1885	1,712 (2022)	18,200 (2022)	11,632 (2022)	42	151–200	78	13	9

== History ==
=== Seoul National University ===
- 1895: The year when the Beopgwan Yangseongso (Judicial Training Center), the first modern legal training institution in Korea established by King Gojong, was founded. It later became one of the ten schools integrated into Seoul National University, and 1895 is recognized as the university's symbolic founding year.
- August 1946: The official founding year of Seoul National University as a national university under the National Seoul National University Establishment Act.

=== Korea University ===
- 1905: Bosung College was established as the first modern private institution of higher education in Korea.
- 1932: Bosung College moved to its current location in Anam-dong, Seoul, expanding its facilities and academic programs.
- 1946 August: "Bosung College" was renamed "Korea University" and became a comprehensive university, expanding into various academic disciplines.

=== Yonsei University ===
- 1885: Former Institute of Severance Medical College and Hospital (later part of Yonsei University) was established. First modern hospital and academic institution built in Korea.
- 1915: Yonhi College established.
- 1957 January: Yonhi University and Severance Medical College and Hospital merged into Yonsei University.

== National recognition ==
As of 2025, graduates of the SKY universities accounted for 29.1% of CEOs among South Korea's top 1,000 companies. In legal education, following the transition to the professional law school system, the law schools of Seoul National University, Korea University, and Yonsei University continue to record among the highest passing rates on the national bar examination, with Seoul National University leading at 85.9%.

Being admitted in one of these universities typically requires students to be within the top 1% of the Korean College Scholastic Ability Test. Hence, high schools would release lists of how many students were admitted to a SKY university each year as a mark of prestige.

The term has also been applied to the music and entertainment industry due to prominent alumni, including Academy Award-winning director Bong Joon Ho and renowned opera singer Sumi Jo. The founders of three of the "Big Four" K-pop labels (Lee Soo-man, Park Jin-young and Bang Si-hyuk) and prominent indie-oriented labels Mystic Story (Yoon Jong-shin) and Antenna (You Hee-yeol) are all graduates of a SKY university.

== Concerns ==
There have been a number of SKY university students who have dropped out of school to protest against South Korea's overheated academic elitism.

== In popular culture ==
- SKY Castle, a 2018–2019 JTBC Friday-Saturday prime time drama, explores the employment of coordinators by parents who wish their children to enter one of the three colleges, which sometimes does not come without consequences.

== See also ==
- Korea University–Yonsei University rivalry
- Oxbridge, referring to the UK's oldest universities, Oxford and Cambridge
- Golden triangle, informal grouping of universities in London and southeast England
- Russell Group, a self-selected association of twenty-four public research universities in the United Kingdom
- Ivy League, formal grouping of elite older private universities in the United States
- Big Three, informal term grouping Harvard, Yale, and Princeton
- Big Four, informal term grouping the four most prestigious universities in the Philippines
- TU9, alliance of nine leading Technical Universities in Germany
- Group of Eight, a group of Australia's top research universities
- National Institutes of Technology, 31 leading public engineering universities in India
- Imperial Universities, grouping of elite older universities in Japan
- C9 League, funding schemes for universities in China
- Double First-Class Construction, colloquially known as the Chinese Ivy League
