= The Big 5 =

Construction event in the Middle East, Africa and South Asia

The Big 5 is the largest construction event in the Middle East, Africa and South Asia. It is held annually in Dubai in late November and attracts in excess of 67,000 construction professionals (audited by BPA Worldwide).

The Big 5 runs alongside six specialised events enabling industry professionals to source products for every stage of the construction projects: The Big 5 Heavy, Middle East Concrete, HVAC R Expo, Middle East Stone, The Big 5 Solar, and the Urban Design & Landscape Expo.

== History ==
The Big 5 has its origins in an event known as Arab Water and came about from an amalgamation of five separate product-focused events that all had a link to the construction sector - such as HVAC and building materials. With the building of the Dubai World Trade Centre, which began to develop in the late 1970s, the event found a permanent home and has expanded in size along with the venue. When dmg events acquired the exhibition in 2000, the event covered some 12,000m²: this has risen to over 100,000m² in gross floor space.

Government support for the event has come from both international and local institutions. In 2007, the event was one of the first in the region to welcome a prime minister when the then Italian leader Romano Prodi visited the exhibition with his minister for international trade. In 2012, British prime minister David Cameron also visited the event in support of his nation's export businesses. The visits reflected both the value of bilateral trade with the UAE but also the rise in importance of the Persian Gulf region as a whole to European export manufacturers.

== Educational events and special features ==
Since 2010 there has been an increasing emphasis on education within the events - in the form of conferences, seminars and workshops - to support continued professional development among audiences. The educational programmes are presented by a wide selection of the industry's architects, consultants, contractors and sub-contractors who volunteer their time and expertise to further the development of the construction sector. These free education components also include certification, overseen by the UK-based CPD Certification Service, so attendance can contribute to a person's membership standing in organisations such as RICS or the CIOB.

In 2018, The Big 5 launched the Women in Construction Forum & Awards initiative, aimed at promoting diversity and inclusion in the workplace in the construction industry. Also worth mentioning is the Start-up City feature dedicated to startups with a viable product for the construction industry.
