= Tawes Theatre =

Coordinates: 38°59′09.4″N 76°56′54.6″W

University of Maryland, College Park campus

The Tawes Fine Arts Building, also known as Tawes Theatre and Tawes Hall, is the home of the University of Maryland's Department of English and is the former home of the Department of Theatre and the School of Music. The Homer Ulrich Recital Hall is located in the building (named in honor of the former chairman of the Department of Music) which was the premier concert hall on campus before the Clarice Smith Performing Arts Center opened in 2001. The building underwent a $15 million renovation beginning in 2007 and reopened in 2009; the university's non-commercial, intellectually driven UMTV cable television station is also housed in renovated facilities in Tawes. The building, constructed in 1965, was named after J. Millard Tawes, who was governor of Maryland from 1958 through 1966. The University of Maryland Art Gallery was initially housed in the Tawes Fine Arts Building beginning in 1965 before moving to a newly constructed exhibition facility in the Parren J. Mitchell Art-Sociology Building in 1976.
