= Big Ten Tournament =

Big Ten Tournament can refer to any Big Ten Conference sport that has a tournament or championship game:

- Big Ten Football Championship Game
- Big Ten men's basketball tournament
- Big Ten women's basketball tournament
- Big Ten baseball tournament
- Big Ten softball tournament
- Big Ten men's ice hockey tournament
- Big Ten men's soccer tournament
- Big Ten women's soccer tournament
- Big Ten women's lacrosse tournament
