= Nami Island International Picture Book Illustration Concours =

The Nami Island International Picture Book Illustration Concours, (Nami Concours), is an international competition held in Korea for children's book artists. The biannual event is sponsored by Nami Island, Korea, and seeks to encourage artistic creativity and advance the quality of picture book illustrations worldwide.

The competition is open to all picture book illustrators and was launched in 2013.

== Objectives ==
In 2013, Nami Concours was added to an existing children's book program NAMBOOK. The Nami Concours was launched for the wider purpose than NAMBOOK, to offer wider opportunities to illustrators from all over the world, who love children's books.

== History ==
The first Nami Concours was held in 2013. It celebrated the opportunity to elevate the level of creativity required in children's picture books. Picture book illustration is a unique art form. The competition helps to heighten the awareness surrounding the high caliber of art required to create outstanding children's books.

== Contest Requirements ==
- Illustrations may be in print or digital format
- Each set of illustrations needs to comprise one story
- Each applicant can upload 5-10 images per entry
- The size of each image may differ as long as the total sum is less than 20MB
- Each work should be at least 1024 pixels
- Each applicant may submit up to three different entries
- Applicants must submit a 100-work synopsis for each entry

== Prizes ==
- Grand Prix (1 prize) Plaque and US$10,000
- Golden Island (2 prizes) Plaque and US$5000
- Green Island (5 prizes) Plaque and US$2000
- Purple Island (10 prizes) Certificate and plaque

== 3rd Nami Concours (2017) ==
A total of 1,777 entries from 89 nations were submitted. A shortlist of 150 illustrators from 43 nations was announced in November 2016. The winners were announced in February 2017 and are listed below.

Grand Prix

- Malgorzata Gurowska (Poland)

Golden Island

- Anna Morgunova (Russia)
- JooHee Yoon (USA)

Green Island

- Myung-ae Lee (Korea)
- Ksenia Rodkina (Russia)
- Amir Shabanjpour (Iran)
- Catarina Sobral (Portugal)
- Albertine Zullo (Switzerland)

Purple Island

- Luca Di Battista (Italy)
- Marilda Castanha (Brazil)
- Julien Cheng (Canada)
- Hye-jin Kim (Korea)
- Ji-min Kim (Korea)
- Yara Kono (Portugal)
- Svetlana Makhrova (Russia)
- Britta Teckentrup (Germany)
- Rong Yu (UK)
- Zou-Chao Zuo (China)

== 2nd Nami Concours (2015) ==
A total of 1,330 entries were submitted from 71 nations. A video of the Nami Concours 2015 was made, including the winning and shortlisted works.

Grand Prix

- Marcelo Pimentel (Brazil)

Golden Island

- Sonja Danowski (Germany)
- Torben Kuhlmann (Germany)

Green Island

- Hassan Amekan (Iran)
- Julie Bernard (Reunion)
- Myeongae Lee (South Korea)

Purple Island

- Awang Fadilah Ali Hussein (Malaysia)
- Manon Gauthier (illustrator) (Canada)
- Maya Hanisch (Chile)
- Mi Jung Lee (illustrator) (South Korea)
- Anna Morgunova (Russia)
- Urszula Palusinska (Poland)
- Andreja Peklar (Slovenia)
- David Pintor (Spain)
- Tatiana Sugachkova (Russia)
- Margarita Surnaite (Lithuania)

== 1st Nami Concours (2013) ==
A total of 619 entries were submitted from 42 nations. A video of the Nami Concours 2013 was made, including the winning works.

Grand Prix

- Sung-hee Kim (South Korea)

Golden Island

- Sonja Danowski (Germany)
- Nooshin Safakhoo (Iran)

Green Island

- Claudia Legnazzi (Argentina)
- Anna Morgunova (Russia)
- Gyu-taek Kim (South Korea)
- Sang-woo Chae (South Korea)
- Jainal Amambing (Malaysia)

Special Prize

- Salah Kamal Eldin Mohammed (Sudan)
- David Pintor (Spain)
- Rashin Kheiriyeh (Iran)
- Irma Gruenholz (Spain)
- Nazli Tahvili (Iran)
- Eva Montanari (Italy)
- Seul-gi Kim (South Korea)
- Iris Daeun (USA)
- Katarzyna Bogucka (Poland)
- Masha Manapov (Israel)

Encouragement Prize

- Yu Pianyi (China)
- Maral Sassouni (France)
- Kamilla Wicttmann (Denmark)
- Ju-mi Lee (Australia)
- Ann James (Australia)
- Hye-young Kim (South Korea)
- Reza Dalvand (Iran)
- Lucie Dvořáková (Czech)
- Diana Margareta Cepleanu (Romania)
- Eun-mi Kim (South Korea)
- Rasa Zmuidiene (Lithuania)
