= Robert H. Smith School of Business =

Business school at University of Maryland, College Park

Robert H. Smith School of Business at the University of Maryland
- Type: Public business school
- Established: 1921
- Parent institution: University of Maryland
- Dean: Prabhudev Konana
- Faculty: 450
- Undergraduates: 2,980
- Postgraduates: 2,050
- Doctoral students: 90
- Location: College Park, Maryland, United States; 38.9875°N 76.94°W
- Website: rhsmith.umd.edu

The Robert H. Smith School of Business (Smith School) is the business school of the University of Maryland, College Park.

The school was renamed in 1998 after alumnus and benefactor Robert H. Smith (accounting, 1950). The school offers programs at both the graduate and undergraduate levels. It is accredited by the Association to Advance Collegiate Schools of Business (AACSB) to award bachelor's, master's, and doctoral degrees in business.

== History ==
=== 20th century ===
By the end of World War I in 1918, the United States had become the leading economic power in the world, and both U.S. domestic business and U.S. investment in overseas operations surged. The stage was set for U.S. universities to heighten focus on formal business education. In 1921, University of Maryland, College Park (UMD) introduced an undergraduate business program within the existing Department of Economics/Business Administration that included courses in Diplomacy, Constitutional law, and Public speaking. Less than 400 students enrolled. 17 years later in 1938, UMD restructured the burgeoning business program into a separate college within the university, renamed the department to the College of Commerce, and appointed internationally recognized economist Dr. W. Mackenzie Stevens to be its first dean. By 1940 the College of Commerce undergraduate business program had earned accreditation from the American Assembly of Collegiate Schools of Business (AACSB) (now internationalized under the name Association to Advance Collegiate Schools of Business). In 1942, new Dean J. Freeman Pyle expanded the curriculum to deliver classes on public administration, and reflected this widened scope by renaming to the College of Business and Public Administration (BPA).

When World War II broke out in 1939, many students and faculty left school to join the military, shrinking 1943 BPA enrollment to only 130 civilians. After World War II ended and with the passage of the 1944 G.I. Bill to federally subsidize veteran's higher education costs, BPA grew substantially in size, instituted a graduate program, and in 1947 issued its first graduate degree—a Masters in Business Administration (MBA). By 1948 enrollment had climbed back to 2,200 students.

In 1961, UMD knocked down an old wooden gymnasium shed and built the new building Millard E. Tydings Hall, which was named after Maryland senator and Maryland Agricultural College (a predecessor school now rolled up into UMD) engineering alumnus "Scott" Millard E. Tydings. College of Business and Public Administration (BPA) moved in and remained there into the 1990s. Donald W. O’Connell, an economist and New York Herald Tribune editorial writer, became dean of the college in 1962 and served in that role for the next 11 years. In 1962, the BPA's graduate MBA program became one of the first MBA programs accredited by AACSB. In 1964 women enrollment grew significantly, and after several years women became fully integrated into student networking organizations and clubs. By 1966 BPA issued its first doctoral degree—Doctor of Business Administration (DBA), and within three years this became a PhD program. Over the next three years, BPA segmented the undergraduate business curriculum into separate disciplines such as Information Systems, Marketing, Business and Public Policy, Accounting, Organizational Behavior (now Management), and Quantitative (now Statistics) in order to better align with business practices. During the same period, BPA actively undertook initiatives to increase enrollment of women and minorities, such as recruiting at historically black colleges and universities and providing targeted financial aid.

In 1973, the Business Administration department within BPA was spun off as a standalone college called College of Business and Management (CBM), with professional jazz saxophone player Rudolph "Rudy" P. Lamone appointed to begin his nineteen-year tenure as Dean. Two years later, the part-time evening MBA programs catering to working professionals were launched at both CBM's main campus in College Park, Maryland and CBM's secondary campus north west in Shady Grove, Maryland. In 1978, CBM instituted its own undergraduate admissions program to enable more selective student recruitment. In 1979, the school offered its first Master of Science (MS) degrees, including an MS in the newly added discipline Finance.

In 1987, CBM launched a pioneering entrepreneurship incubator called Dingman Center for Entrepreneurship, which was named after donor Michael D. Dingman, the founder of Signal Corporation (later merged into AlliedSignal, and then into Honeywell).

In 1993, CBM consolidated from Tydings Hall and other College Park locations into the newly constructed Van Munching Hall on the College Park campus, which building was named after alumnus donor Leo Van Munching Jr., the president of a New York City company that imported Heineken beer. The same year, the College of Business and Management Foundation (CBMF) infused $250,000 into a student-run investment management fund named The Terrapin Fund. In 1995, CBM was renamed to the Maryland Business School (MBS). In 1996, MBS reached into Europe for the first time by partnering with the University of Łódź to deliver a Management Education program in Łódź, Poland. Also in 1996, the school augmented its MBA program with an experiential learning module (ELM) wherein the school suspends all activities in order to focus on Ethics. In 1999, The Terrapin Fund was renamed to the Mayer Fund in honor of alumnus donor William Emilio Mayer.

In the mid-1990s, groundbreaking online marketplace platforms and e-commerce payment systems such as Amazon.com (1995), eBay (1995), and PayPal (1998) were launched. In 1998, the school recognized the growing role of information technology by adding new MBA concentrations such as Telecommunication, Technology management, Supply Chain and Logistics Management, and Electronic commerce. The same year, the business school was renamed to Robert H. Smith School of Business in honor of alumnus donor Robert H. Smith (RHS), who was the real estate developer behind building Crystal City complex in Arlington County, Virginia. One year later, RHS extended its part-time evening MBA program to a new Baltimore campus. Also in 1999, a second donation from alumnus Leo Van Munching Jr. was used to begin an expansion that would ultimately double the size of Van Munching Hall.

=== 21st century ===
The Smith School began 2000 by extending the part-time, evening MBA program to a 3rd campus in Washington, D.C. Two years later RHS completed the expansion of Van Munching Hall, and RHS was able to consolidate all undergraduate and graduate school students into a single building. In 2003, the Dingman Center for Entrepreneurship helped launch a public venture capital fund for fledgling mid-Atlantic companies called the New Markets Growth Fund (NMGF). In 2003, the Smith School added its executive MBA (EMBA) program to the College Park campus curriculum, and made its first inroads into Asia by developing and teaching the EMBA curriculum in Beijing, China in partnership with the hosting University of International Business and Economics. In 2006 the college instituted a graduate Master of Business in Accounting program, in part to satisfy increased industry demand for audit professionals due to the 2002 U.S. Sarbanes-Oxley Act. The same year, the Smith School launched the Lemma Senbet Fund student-run investment management fund for undergraduate Finance students starting with an initial capital infusion of $50,000. In 2009, Smith added another Master of Science (MS) business degree with a concentration in Finance.

In the 2000s, most major universities began to add web-based ("online") courses to their curriculum. In 2013, the Smith School created its first online degree program, which culminates in an MBA.

== Campuses ==
The Robert H. Smith School of Business is a part of the University of Maryland, located principally in College Park, Maryland, just northeast of Washington, D.C. The school also has a presence at Shady Grove, Baltimore, as well as in the Ronald Reagan Building and International Trade Center in Washington, D.C. The Smith School offers an executive MBA program in Beijing, China.

== Academics ==
Business school rankings

U.S. MBA Rankings
- Bloomberg (2025): 33

The Smith School offers programs at both the graduate and undergraduate levels, including Bachelor's degrees, Master's degree, and PhDs. Degrees are offered in traditional business school majors such as Accounting and Finance. However, for certain concentrations often offered by standalone business colleges (e.g., Economics), University of Maryland (UMD) instead offers those programs and associated degrees in a different sister school within the university.

=== Departments ===
- Accounting
- Information Systems
- Finance
- Supply Chain Management
- Management
- Marketing
- International Business

=== Notable faculty ===
- Dr. Rajshree Agarwal, Strategy and Entrepreneurship
- Michael Faulkender, Finance
- Peter Morici, Logistics, Business & Public Policy
- Wendy Moe, Marketing
- Roland Rust, Marketing
- Michel Wedel, Marketing

== Notable alumni ==
- Eric Billings, Chairman/Founder of FBR Capital Markets, chairman and CEO of Arlington Asset Investment Corp
- Michael L. Chapman, Sheriff of Loudoun County, Virginia
- Bill Cook, member of the North Carolina General Assembly
- Taylor Cummings, athlete
- Don Cusic, author, songwriter and record producer
- Carly Fiorina, former CEO of Hewlett-Packard
- Joseph Gildenhorn, former U.S. Ambassador to Switzerland
- Steven B. Grant, 55th Mayor of Boynton Beach
- Harry Hughes, 57th Governor of Maryland
- Nandini Jammi, activist and brand safety consultant
- Chris Kubasik, CEO of L3Harris Technologies
- David Landsberg, actor, writer, and producer
- Samuel J. LeFrak, American real estate tycoon
- Albert P. Li, CEO of In Vitro ADMET Laboratories
- Patrick Maggitti, first provost of Villanova University and former dean of the Villanova School of Business
- Brian Manning, Member of Parliament in the House of Representatives for San Fernando East
- Bill Mayer, former owner of Virginia Destroyers
- Ryan D. McCarthy, 24th United States Secretary of the Army*Thomas V. Miller Jr., 85th President of the Maryland Senate
- Marc Melitz, Professor at Harvard University
- Chen Ming-jer, Professor at University of Virginia Darden School of Business
- Edmundo Mireles Jr., special agent of the Federal Bureau of Investigation
- Creig Northrop, CEO of Northop Realty
- Jim O'Brien, senior advisor for the Philadelphia 76ers
- Douglas J. J. Peters, Majority Leader of the Maryland Senate
- Kevin Plank, Chairman/CEO/Founder of Under Armour
- Idan Ravin, basketball trainer
- Mojo Rawley, professional wrestler and football player
- Eileen M. Rehrmann, 4th Executive of Harford County
- Frank Ryan, member of the Pennsylvania House of Representatives for the 101st District
- Andy Shallal, CEO of Busboys and Poets
- Faryar Shirzad, Chief Policy Officer at Coinbase and former member of United States National Security Council
- Robert H. Smith, American builder-developer and philanthropist
- Timur Suleimenov, former Minister of National Economy
- Patricia L. Turner, CEO of American College of Surgeons
- Dale E. Twomley, CEO of Worthington Foods, Inc.
- Genevievette Walker-Lightfoot, former U.S. SEC attorney
- Larry D. Welch, 12th Chief of Staff of the United States Air Force
- David F. Wherley Jr., former commander of the District of Columbia National Guard
- Ellen Zavian, sports agent and attorney

== See also ==
- List of United States business school rankings
- List of business schools in the United States
