= Sias =

Sias or SIAS may refer to:

- Sias, West Virginia, unincorporated community in Lincoln County, West Virginia, United States
- Sias International University, a private college affiliated with Zhengzhou University in Henan Province, People's Republic of China
- Some Institutes for Advanced Study

== People with the surname ==
- Don E. Sias (died 1934), American politician

== SIAS ==
- Social Interaction Anxiety Scale, a self-report scale that measures distress when meeting and talking with others
- Spina iliaca anterior superior, medical Latin term for the Anterior superior iliac spine
- Student Investment Advisory Service, student managed investments fund and part of Simon Fraser University
- Serviciul pentru Intervenții și Acțiuni Speciale, a task force of the Romanian Police
