= Crystal City Underground =

Shopping mall in Arlington, Virginia

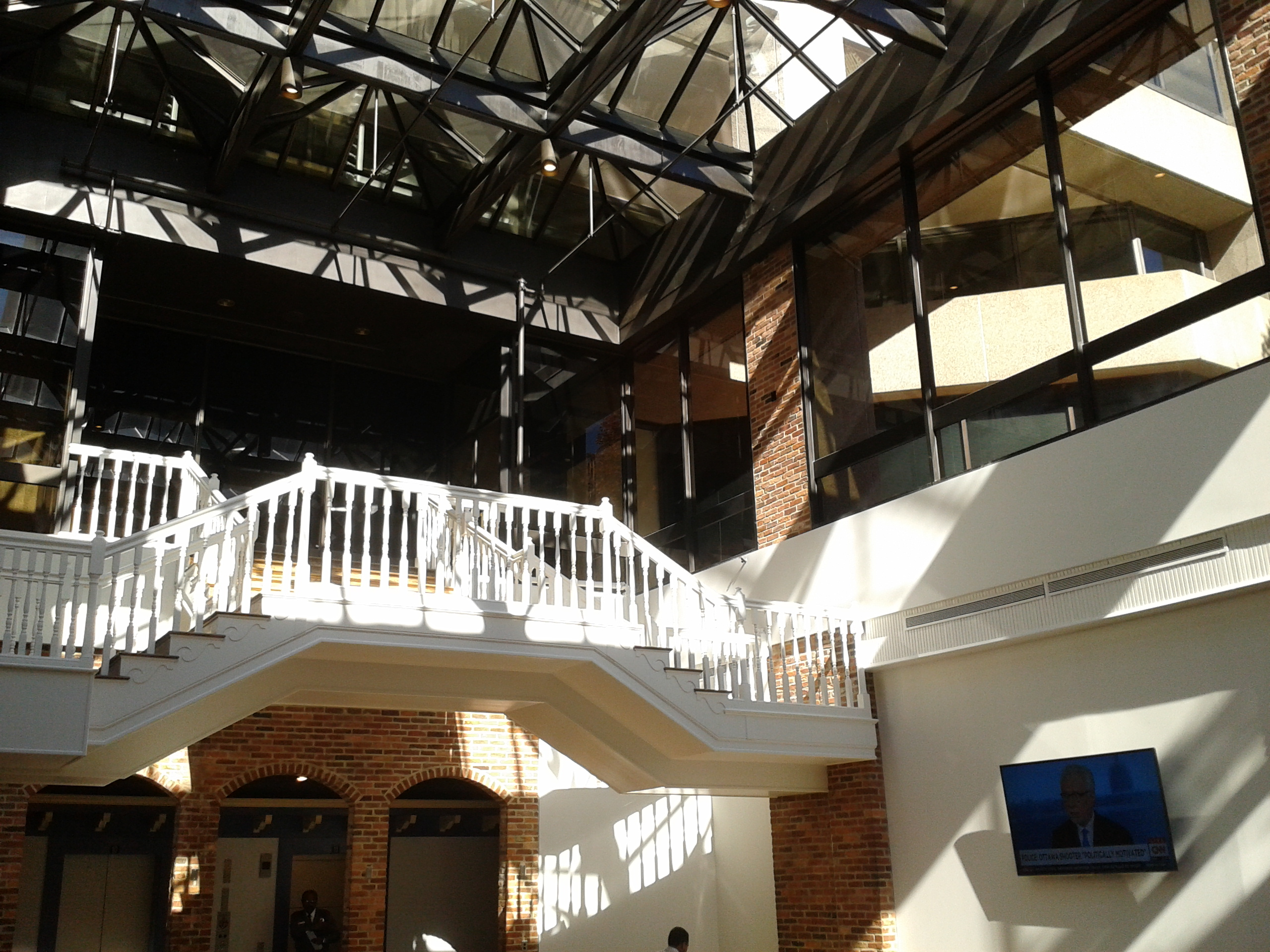
- Interior of the Crystal City Underground in 2014
- Location: Crystal City, Arlington County, Virginia, United States
- Opened: September 1976
- Closed: October 31, 2024
- Developer: Charles E. Smith Companies
- Owner: JBG Smith
- Num. of stores: More than 100 at its peak
- Floor area: 150,000 sq ft (14,000 m^{2})
- Floors: 1
- Parking: Connected parking garages
- Public transit: Crystal City; Crystal City VRE station

The Crystal City Underground was an underground shopping mall located in the Crystal City neighborhood in Arlington County, Virginia.

The mall used to be a prominent community gathering space until the tables and chairs were removed. The Underground contains an indoor connection to the Crystal City metro station station and parking, in addition to convenient pedestrian access. More than 29,000 people live in Crystal City within close walking distance of the Underground.

Crystal City was developed in the 1960s and 1970s by a Charles Smith and his son Robert Smith with a large underground mall that primarily catered to office workers.

After the loss of office tenants, Crystal City was redeveloped to attract visitors to restaurants. This involved closing down community gathering spaces in the Underground that were created to fill the void left by less foot traffic.

== History ==
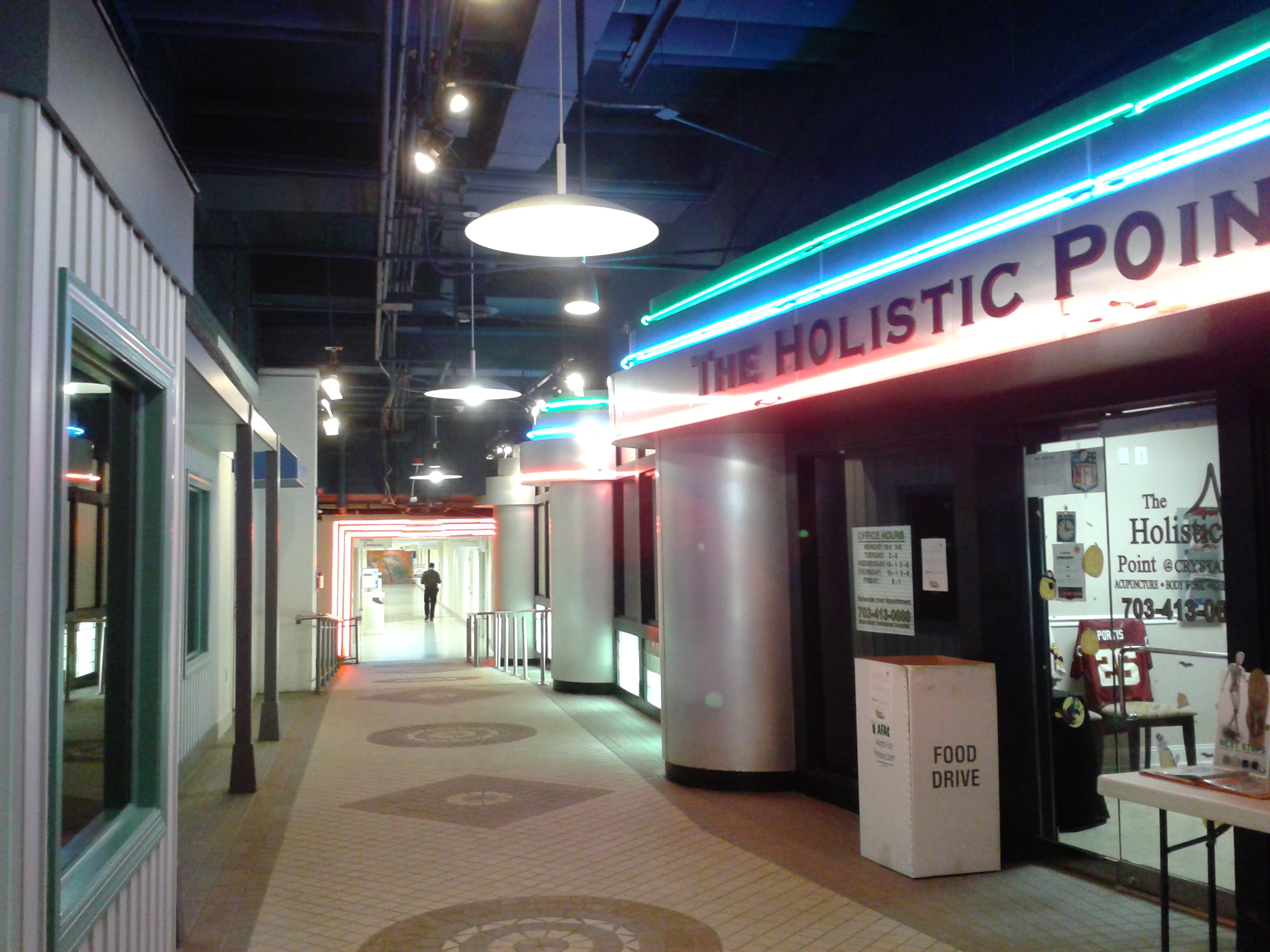
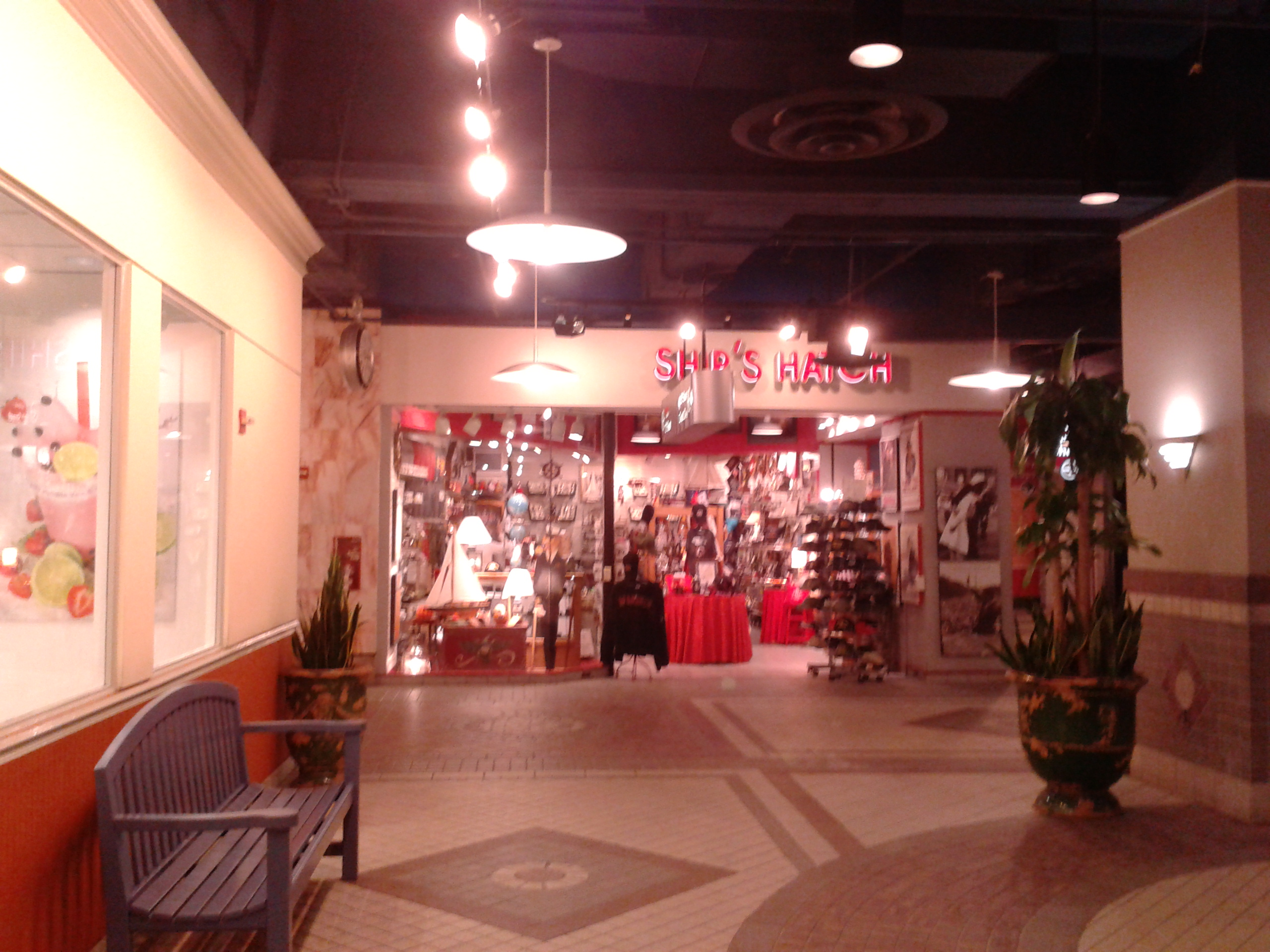
Interior of the Crystal City Underground in 2014.

When developer Robert Smith started construction on the Underground as a shopping mall in 1976, he made sure the Underground was connected with newly constructed buildings in Crystal City. The Underground opened in 1976, and soon expanded to more than a hundred retailers and a variety of restaurants including a food court. By 1980 Crystal City had a daytime population estimated at 70,000, which led to a large amount of traffic to the Underground.

Smith saw the Underground as a place where people could live, shop and work without going outside. "It was convenience at its finest", said Jack Levonian, the owner of Metro Camera, who opened his shop at the Underground right at the mall's unveiling. "Any store that opened already had a built-in customer base."

Despite the success of the Underground, visibility was an ongoing issue. In 1981, one storeowner said: "It's got great potential and good stores, but they the Smith Companies have to figure out a way to get it advertised. . . . What we need is a nice ugly neon sign out front," the shopkeeper added"

In addition to visibility issues, the Underground had a problem with the fact that it was designed to cater to office workers and not local residents, with most of the stores closing early in the evenings. Also, the outside areas of Crystal City were not very pedestrian friendly due to large blocks and challenging road crossings.

== Crystal City in the 2000s and changes that created more community space ==
During the early 2000s, a significant number of the restaurants and stores closed and Crystal City lost many office tenants. A federal process known as the 2005 Base Realignment and Closure Commission (BRAC) caused many military jobs and customers to move. Also, the United States Patent and Trademark Office and its more than 7,000 employees moved out of Crystal City. The 2008 recession caused additional tenants to move.

In response to BRAC, Arlington County created the Crystal City Planning Task Force and the Crystal City Business Improvement District. Crystal City lost 13,000 defense and military jobs representing about one-third of the workforce, and lost defense tenants leasing 3 million square feet of office space.

During this time, the Crystal City Underground continued to develop a reputation from visitors for being unappealing. Mitchell N. Schear, president of Charles E. Smith Commercial Realty, LP, which owned most of the commercial property said: "the original vision of Crystal City, much of which was built in the 1960s, 'has run its useful life'".

After BRAC, the main part of the Underground was renamed to be called the Crystal City Shops@1750. A Washington Post article discussing the rename mentioned that locally owned lunch spots were replaced by fast food chains. Later, the article implied that Underground was outdated and had too much of a focus on efficiency. This was another example of media coverage saying input from locals was unimportant, and it did so by suggesting that local businesses being allowed to close was a sign of progress.

While there were significant issues with Crystal City at the time such as not being outdoor pedestrian friendly, and open space around buildings that was not being used, there were great things about Crystal City. For residents, the presence of local businesses in the Underground, and connectivity to the Metro were great. Indoor community spaces can also be maintained while promoting more outdoor walkability, which was successfully done for a while.

Some time after BRAC, the Underground was renovated to include more community space. The largest space was called The Landing, which was located at the mall's former food court. It had enough chairs and tables for more than 100 people.

== Closing ==
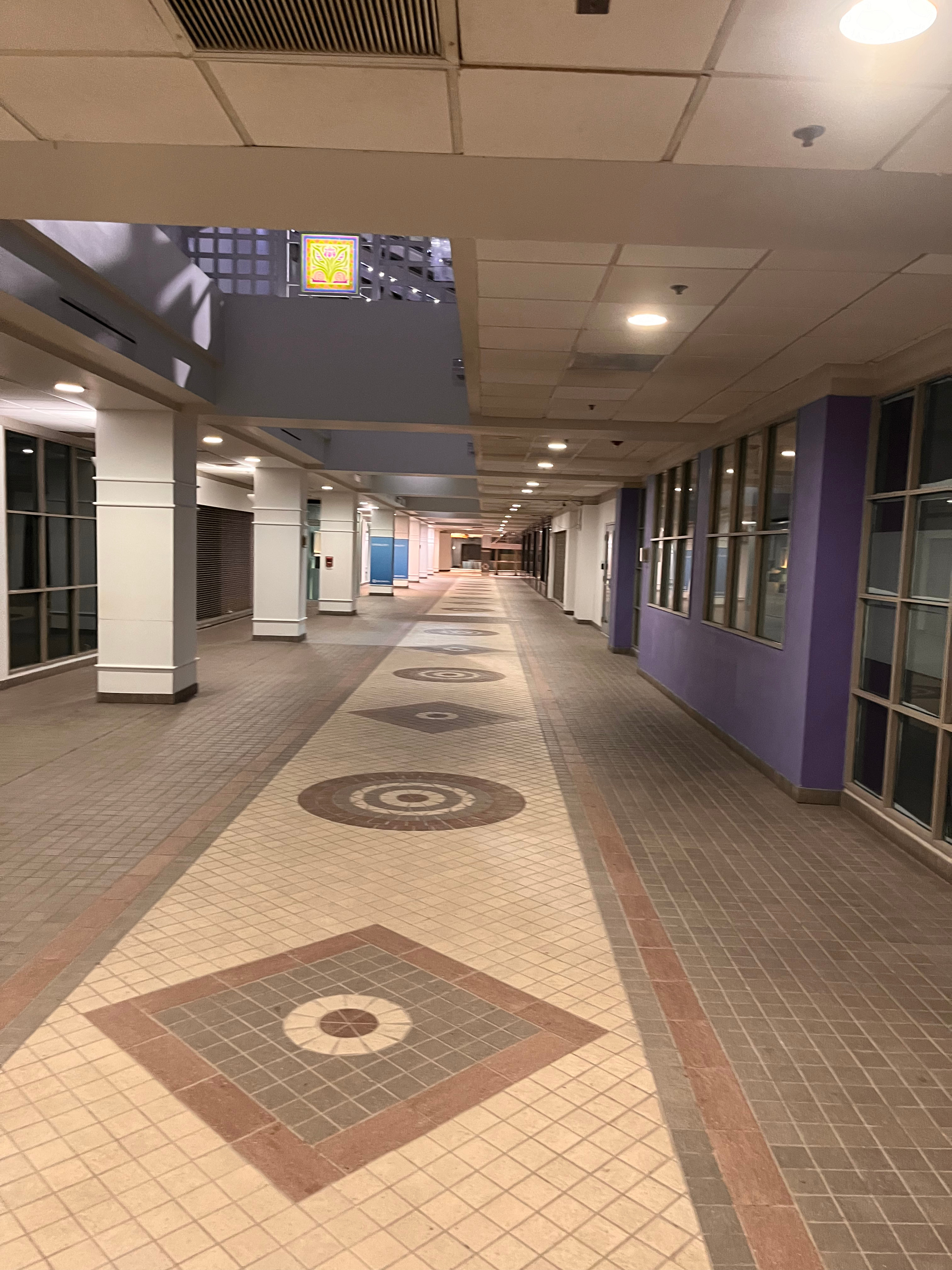
An empty hallway in the Crystal City Underground in February 2026.

In 2018, two of the community gathering spaces were closed down. One was turned into a hallway. The other was renovated into a movie theater and restaurants. The prices of food at these restaurants and limited table space availability made them impractical as community gathering spaces. They were designed to cater to office workers and people coming to spend money on food, and closed earlier in the nights.

In 2024, remaining tenants received the news that no leases in the Underground would be renewed, and most of them had to leave by October 31.

In August 2024, all the tables and chairs at the Landing were also removed. In October 2025, tables and chairs in the Underground near We The Pizza were also removed.

== Development plans from Crystal City Sector plan ==
Crystal City is currently being developed in accordance with the Crystal City Sector plan. It is a 40 year plan that was adopted in 2010 with the goal of making Crystal City a more inviting, lively, and walkable community.

The Crystal City Sector plan calls for a variety of internal retail space and suggests that some retail spaces could be used for civic or cultural use. One example is mentioning that space unused by retail in the Underground could be turned into public exhibit spaces. There is also a proposal for a multiple theaters.

The Crystal City Sector plan says the Underground should be preserved in much of its current form. It specifies an enhanced pedestrian experience with a continuous pedestrian connection extending from 12th Street south to 23rd street. Also, it says cultural and arts features should be included. At the end of the sector plan section on the Underground, it says: "The goal is to establish a dynamic pedestrian experience that grows and supports a robust marketplace, while creating an attractive, interesting, and fun community and civic life"

== Other news coverage ==
- Where We Shop: Crystal City prepares for loss of Pentagon Agencies, Washington Post, May 23, 2010
- Crystal City. Ghost Town or New Town?, Washington Post, August 27, 2005
- Crystal City Attempts to Change for the Better, Washington Post, June 5, 2005
- Crystal City Surfaces, Washington Post, November 7, 2004
- Crystal City, A Model of Convenience, March 25, 1995
- The Life Down Under, Washington Post, February 24, 1994
- Crystal City: On a Clear Day You Can See Development Forever, Washington Post, May 17, 1981
- "Crystal City", Washington Post, October 14, 1984
- "Crystal City", Washington Post, December 7, 1977
