= Charles Smith (developer) =

Real estate developer and philanthropist

Charles E. Smith
- Born: Schmidoff; March 28, 1901; Lipnick, Russian Empire
- Died: December 30, 1995 (aged 94); Palm Beach, Florida, US
- Education: degree in accounting
- Alma mater: City College of New York
- Occupations: Real estate developer, philanthropist
- Years active: in business until 1967; philanthropist thereafter
- Organization: Charles E. Smith Companies
- Board member of: George Washington University trustee 1967–1976
- Spouse(s): Leah Goldstein (m. 1927–death 1972) Miriam Uretz Smith (div. 1988)
- Children: Arlene Kogod, Robert H. Smith
- Relatives: Robert Kogod (son-in-law); David Bruce Smith (grandson)
- Awards: honorary doctorates from: Hebrew University of Jerusalem; Jewish Theological Seminary of America; George Washington University Honorary Doctor of Public Service, 1979

Charles Emil Smith (né Schmidoff; March 28, 1901 – December 30, 1995) was a real estate developer and philanthropist in the Washington metropolitan area.

== Biography ==
=== Early life ===
Smith (born Schmidoff), was born in Lipnick, Russian Empire on March 28, 1901 to Sadie and Reuven Schmidoff, in an Orthodox Russian Jewish family. His family farmed potatoes and corn. At age 7, he contracted diphtheria. His father immigrated to the U.S. in 1908 to earn money to bring the rest of the family over. Smith immigrated to Brownsville, Brooklyn, in 1911 speaking only Yiddish upon his arrival. He was placed in the fourth grade despite being the same age as sixth graders. He learned English quickly and graduated from City College of New York. His father became a real estate developer and brought Smith into the business.

=== Career ===
Smith started a home construction company in Brooklyn, but lost everything in the Great Depression. To support himself, Smith invested in parking spaces and vending machines.

In 1942, due to an insatiable demand for housing during World War II, Smith moved to Rockville, Maryland. With financing from a friend, Smith built 50 houses in Prince George's County, Maryland, but lost money on the development after costs soared. After working for Waverly Taylor for 3 years, he founded the Charles E. Smith Company in 1946, with money from friends. He then changed focus to developing income-producing apartment properties in Washington, D.C. for long-term investments, taking advantage of low-cost government financing. In 1960, he built his first office building, 1717 Pennsylvania Avenue NW. In 1961, at the suggestion of his son, Robert H. Smith, the company began developing in Crystal City, Virginia, which at the time was a "conglomeration of places that sold junk, used tires, a drive-in movie theater, a run-down ice skating rink, second-hand materials -- it was very unattractive." Smith initially opposed the idea.

He retired in 1967 and turned to philanthropy, giving control of the company to his son, Robert H. Smith, and his son-in-law, Robert P. Kogod.

=== Philanthropy ===
Smith financed and organized a complex in Rockville for Jewish agencies including the Hebrew Home for the Aged, the Jewish Social Service Agency and the Jewish Community Center. He was a trustee of George Washington University (GWU) from 1967 to 1976 as well as Chairman of the Committee on University Development. The Charles E. Smith Center at George Washington University is named in his honor.

He played a key role in developing GW's branch campus in Loudoun County, Virginia.

His contributions to Jewish philanthropy include:

- Charles E. Smith Jewish Day School
- Charles E. Smith Life Communities
- Hartman High School- Charles E. Smith High School for Boys
- Charles E. Smith Family and Prof. Joel Elkes Laboratory for Collaborative Research in Psychobiology
- Charles E. Smith chair in Judaic studies at GWU

Smith held honorary doctorates from Hebrew University of Jerusalem, the Jewish Theological Seminary and George Washington University. In 1997, he was posthumously awarded an Honor Award from the National Building Museum alongside other community developers of Washington, D.C., including Morris Cafritz and Charles Antone Horsky.

== Personal life ==
Smith married twice. His first wife was Leah Goldstein of Yonkers whom he married on February 8, 1927; they had two children, Robert H. Smith and Arlene Smith Kogod (married to Robert P. Kogod). Leah died in 1972. His second wife was Miriam Schuman Uretz Smith; they divorced in 1988.

== Bibliography ==
- Smith, Charles E.; Smith, David Bruce; Muller, Peter (1985). Building My Life. Washington, D. C.?: C.E. Smith. ISBN 9780985047719. LCCN 86463574.
- Smith, Charles E.; Smith, David Bruce (1998). Building the Community: Memorable Events in my Life. Washington D.C.: C.E. Smith. ISBN 978-0-9850477-3-3. LCCN 97181010.
- Smith, Charles E.; Smith, David Bruce (1993). Letters to my Children. LCCN 93204323.
