= Robert H. Smith (philanthropist) =

American builder, developer and philanthropist

- Born: Robert Hilton Smith; July 21, 1928; Brooklyn, New York, U.S.
- Died: December 29, 2009 (aged 81); Crystal City, Virginia, U.S.
- Education: University of Maryland, College Park (1950)
- Occupations: Real estate developer, philanthropist
- Known for: Development of Crystal City
- Spouse: Clarice Smith
- Children: Michelle Smith; David Bruce Smith; Stephen Smith
- Father: Charles Smith

Robert Hilton Smith (July 21, 1928 – December 29, 2009) was an American builder-developer and philanthropist. After taking over his father's real estate development business, Smith developed much of the Crystal City neighborhood, just south of Washington, D.C.

== Early life and education ==
Smith was born to a Jewish family, the son of Leah (née Goldstein) and Charles Smith. His father was a Jewish immigrant from Russia who founded the Charles E. Smith Companies in 1946. The company grew to become one of the largest commercial and residential landlords in the Washington, D.C., area, managing 24,000,000 square feet (2,200,000 m^{2}) of office space and more than 30,000 residential units. Smith graduated from the University of Maryland, College Park in 1950 with a degree in accounting.

== Career ==
Robert and his brother-in-law, Robert P. Kogod, took control of Charles E. Smith Companies in 1967. Smith oversaw construction and development, and Kogod led leasing and management.

Starting in the early 1960s, Smith developed the Crystal City neighborhood of Arlington, Virginia, just south of Washington, D.C., which at the time, Smith said "was very unattractive" but Smith saw that "there was an airport, there was The Pentagon, and that driving to D.C. was a pretty short distance". Smith attracted government leases by offering discounted rents that did not go up over time.

In 1988, an article in The Washington Post estimated his net worth to be $290 million.

In 1995, Forbes estimated the Smith family fortune to be worth $560 million.

In 2001, the residential division of the company was merged into Archstone. The commercial division of the company was merged into Vornado Realty Trust, which merged the division into JBG Smith in 2017.

== Philanthropy ==
=== Education and medicine ===
Smith gave a total of approximately $100 million to the University of Maryland, College Park, his alma mater, including $30 million each to the Clarice Smith Performing Arts Center, completed in 2001 and named after his wife, Clarice Smith, and the business school, Robert H. Smith School of Business, which was named after him in 1998.

In December 2005, Smith donated $12 million to Charles E. Smith Life Communities, a senior housing and elder care campus in Rockville, Maryland.

In 2006, his family foundation donated $15 million to the Charles E. Smith Jewish Day School, also in Rockville.

Smith served as chairman of the board of governors at the Hebrew University of Jerusalem from 1981 to 1985 and was awarded an honorary doctorate degree in 1984. He served as president of the Washington D.C. chapter of the American Friends of the Hebrew University.

In February 2008, he donated $10 million to renovate the Charles E. Smith Center at George Washington University, which is named in his father's honor.

Smith's contributions to Johns Hopkins Hospital funded the construction of a new research and surgical building for the Wilmer Ophthalmological Institute, which opened in June 2009.

The Robert H. Smith Faculty of Agriculture, Food and Environment at Hebrew University of Jerusalem was named for him due to his support.

=== Historic preservation efforts ===
Smith's donations help fund the Robert H. & Clarice Smith Auditorium at George Washington's Mount Vernon Estate and Gardens.

Smith donated to fund the visitor center at Thomas Jefferson's Monticello. The Thomas Jefferson Foundation renamed its International Center for Jefferson Studies the Robert H. Smith International Center for Jefferson Studies after Smith endowed the Center with a $15 million gift in 2004.

In 2008, Smith donated $7 million of the $15 million cost to renovate President Lincoln's Cottage at the Soldiers' Home.

In November 2007, the National Society of Madison Family Descendants awarded the Madison Family Cup to Robert H. Smith for his extraordinary contributions to James Madison’s legacy and the preservation and development of Montpelier.

Smith collected European paintings before donating his collection to the National Gallery of Art. Smith served as President of the gallery between 1993 and 2003, during which the museum expanded significantly.

=== National Humanities Medal ===
In 2008, President George W. Bush awarded Smith with the National Humanities Medal.

== Personal life ==
In 1952, Smith married artist Clarice Smith, née Chasen. They had three children, Michelle and David, and Stephen (died 2003). They resided in Crystal City, Virginia until his death of a stroke in December 2009. Services were held at Adas Israel Congregation in Cleveland Park, D.C.
