= University of Maryland School of Music =

Music school at the University of Maryland

Coordinates: 38°59′26″N 76°57′2″W

School of Music
- School of Music Logo
- Type: Public
- Established: 1954
- Parent institution: University of Maryland, College Park
- Director: Jared R. Rawlings
- Location: College Park, Maryland, Maryland, United States
- Campus: Suburban
- Website: music.umd.edu

The School of Music is a department-level school within the College of Arts and Humanities at the University of Maryland, College Park.

== Academics ==
The School of Music is a comprehensive music school, with undergraduate and graduate programs areas of study. The school offers the following degrees: Doctor of Philosophy (PhD), Doctor of Musical Arts (DMA), Master of Music (MM), Master of Arts (MA), Bachelor of Music (BM), Bachelor of Music Education (BME), and Bachelor of Arts (BA). Specializations within these degrees include composition, conducting, music education, music history & literature, music theory, and performance (piano, string, voice & opera, wind & percussion, jazz).

Academically, the School of Music is a constituent of the university's College of Arts & Humanities. Logistically, the school is located in the university's Clarice Smith Performing Arts Center, a 318,000-square-foot (29,500 m^{2}) facility completed in 2001.

The National Orchestral Institute is a program of the School of Music.

== History ==
From the time when the university was still Maryland Agricultural College, student bands and choirs and military bands have existed on campus. The Department of Music was founded in 1954 and accredited by the National Association of Schools of Music in 1966. In 1995, the Board of Regents approved the renaming of the Department of Music as the School of Music, while it remained a departmental unit within the College of Arts and Humanities.
