= Robert P. Kogod =

American business executive and philanthropist

Robert Kogod
- Born: 1932 (age 93–94) or 1931 (age 94–95)
- Education: American University, BS (1962)
- Spouse: Arlene Smith
- Relatives: Charles Smith (father-in-law); Robert Smith (brother-in-law)

Robert P. Kogod (born 1931 or 1932) is a business executive and philanthropist. Along with his brother-in-law, Robert H. Smith, Kogod led the Charles E. Smith Companies, the real estate company that developed much of the Crystal City neighborhood, just south of Washington, D.C.

== Early life and education ==
Kogod's family fled Poland in 1905 due to persecution and antisemitism. Kogod grew up in Washington, DC, attended Roosevelt High School, and graduated from American University in 1962.

== Career ==
In 1956, Kogod, who was already a real estate developer, married Arlene Smith, the daughter of real estate tycoon Charles E. Smith; he joined the Charles E. Smith Companies in 1959.

Kogod and his brother-in-law, Robert H. Smith, took charge of the company in 1967. Robert Smith oversaw construction and development, and Kogod led leasing and management. In 1995, Forbes estimated the Smith family fortune to be worth $560 million.

In 2001, the residential division of the company was merged into Archstone. The commercial division of the company was merged into Vornado Realty Trust, which merged the division into JBG Smith in 2017.

=== Trustee positions ===
Kogod is a member of the Board of Regents of the Smithsonian Institution; and the Board of Directors of the District of Columbia College Access Program, the Jewish Federation of Greater Washington, Hillel International and the Island Foundation on Mount Desert Island, Maine.

== Philanthropy ==
Kogod has given to education, the arts, and Jewish causes. His philanthropic contributions have helped fund the following:

- In 1979, American University renamed its business school as the Kogod School of Business after a significant donation by Kogod.
- In 1980, Kogod was involved in the development of the Embassy of Israel in Washington, D.C.
- In 2004, Kogod made a $25 million gift to the Smithsonian Institution to renovate the historic Patent Office Building.
- In 2007, Kogod's gift to the Smithsonian Institution also funded a glass canopy, designed by Sir Norman Foster, over the 28,000 square foot Kogod Courtyard that joins the Smithsonian American Art Museum and the National Portrait Gallery.
- Kogod Cradle, a 200-seat flexible space for plays at Arena Stage.
- Kogod Lobby and Kogod House at Studio Theatre, opened in 2004.
- Arlene and Robert Kogod Center for the Arts, a classroom building with a 465-seat theater, opened in 1982, at Sidwell Friends School.
- Robert & Arlene Kogod Theater, a 200-seat flexible space, opened in 2001 at the Clarice Smith Performing Arts Center at the University of Maryland.
- The Arlene and Robert Kogod Lobby at the Atlas Performing Arts Center.
- The ARK Theatre, a 110-seat flexible space, opened in 2006 at the Signature Theatre.
- Arlene and Robert Kogod Lobby at the Shakespeare Theatre Company
- Kogod made a $2 million contribution to the Woolly Mammoth Theatre Company.
- Robert and Arlene Kogod Program on Aging at the Mayo Clinic.
- Kogod Research Center for Contemporary Jewish Thought at the Shalom Hartman Institute.
- Robert and Arlene Kogod Library of Judaic Studies

== Political involvement ==
Kogod has contributed to the campaigns of many politicians, almost all members of the Democratic Party, including Chris Van Hollen and Charles Schumer.
