= Clarice Smith Performing Arts Center =

The Clarice Smith Performing Arts Center
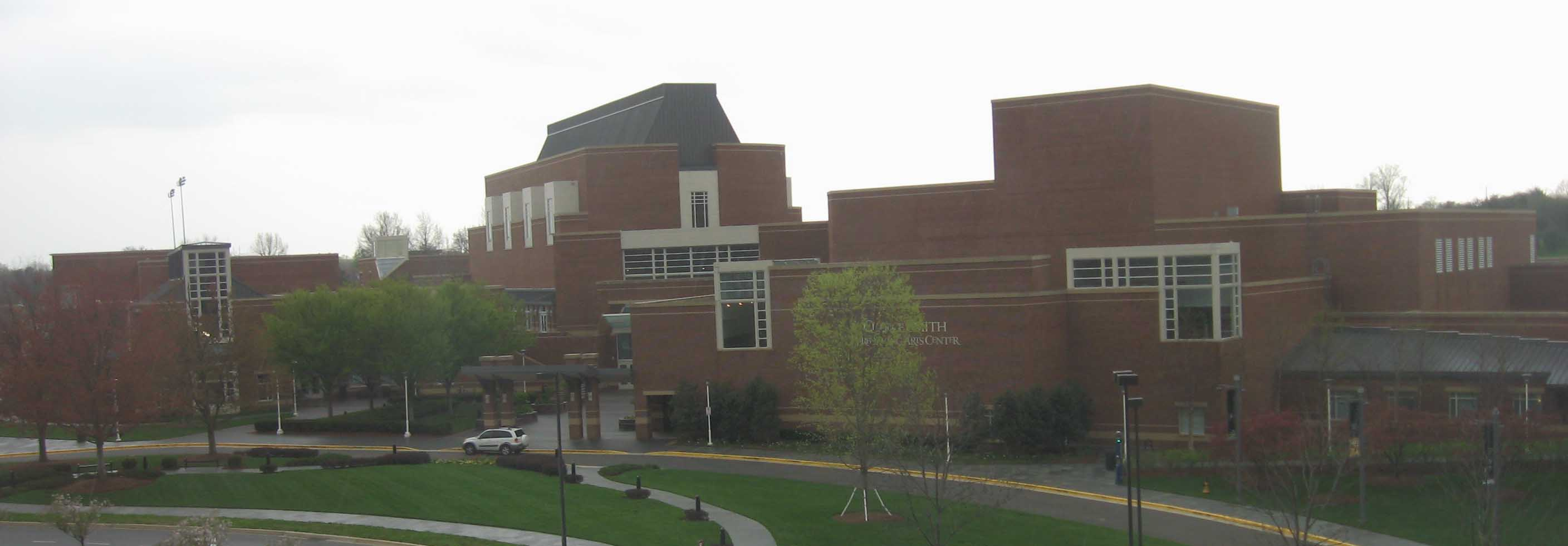
- A front view of the Clarice in 2006

General information
- Status: The largest single building ever constructed by the State of Maryland
- Type: Performance venue and academic building
- Location: University of Maryland, 8270 Alumni Drive; College Park, MD 20742-1625
- Coordinates: 38°59′27″N 76°57′02″W
- Named for: Clarice Smith
- Completed: 2001

Design and construction
- Architect: Moore Ruble Yudell

Website
- theclarice.umd.edu

The Clarice Smith Performing Arts Center is a performing arts complex on the campus of the University of Maryland, College Park. The 318,000-square-foot (29,500 m^{2}) facility, which opened in 2001, houses six performance venues; the UM School of Music; and the UMD School of Theatre, Dance, and Performance Studies. It also houses the Michelle Smith Performing Arts Library. The center operates under the auspices of the University of Maryland College of Arts and Humanities.

The Clarice presents an annual performance season of music, dance and theatre featuring visiting artists and student/faculty artists from the performing arts academic programs. In 2014, the venue rebranded itself The Clarice. The introduction of this brand was accompanied by a series of mostly-free-of-charge events called the NextNOW Festival near the beginning of the Fall semester. The center also rents performance and meeting space to community groups.

The building is located on the northern side of the University of Maryland campus, off University Boulevard (MD-193) and Stadium Drive in Prince George's County, Maryland. It is directly across the street from Capital One Field at Maryland Stadium and the 800-space Stadium Drive parking garage.

== History ==
The Clarice Smith Center is named in honor of visual artist Clarice Smith, whose late husband Robert H. Smith (UM ’50) was a major philanthropist who supported projects in culture, business and Jewish life. As an alumnus of the University of Maryland, he made major contributions to The Clarice Smith Performing Arts Center and to the Robert H. Smith School of Business.

The Clarice Smith Performing Arts Center was originally conceived as an academic center for teaching the performing arts, but during the planning stages that mission evolved to include not only presentation of performances by touring artists, but also the creation of programs that focused on the people of Prince George's County, Maryland, where the University of Maryland is located. Thus there are now occasionally events organized entirely by outside contractors, for which the Clarice disclaims responsibility.

== Architecture ==
Situated on 17 acres (69,000 m^{2}) of land, the 318,000-square-foot (29,500 m^{2}) facility was the largest single building ever constructed by the State of Maryland. The initial cost of the building was $130 million, supported in partnership by the State of Maryland, the University of Maryland, and Prince George's County. It was designed by international architects Moore Ruble Yudell in association with Ayers/Saint/Gross; acoustical consultant Kirkegaard Associates; theatre consultants Theatre Project Consultants; mechanical/electrical/plumbing engineering by Henry Adams LLC; and lobby interiors by Gensler. Construction was by Turner Construction Company.

Five of the center's six performance spaces are accessible from the Grand Pavilion, the center's main lobby; the sixth is at the top of the stairs in the Upper Pavilion. The Dekelboum Concert Hall, Gildenhorn Recital Hall, and Kay theatre feature a specially designed silent HVAC system, making them ideal locations for music recording. Clarice also offers a large grass area space on the back side of the building where students frequently study and enjoy disc golf and table tennis.

- Grand Pavilion
  - As the main entrance to the performing arts center, the Grand Pavilion serves as the town square of the performing arts village. Approximately 3,800 square feet in size, it can comfortably accommodate up to 600 standing guests or 325 seated guests.
- Elsie & Marvin Dekelboum Concert Hall
  - 970-seat concert hall
  - Main floor, balcony, and boxes on both sides
  - Partially retractable riser system
  - Adjustable acoustical curtains
- Ina and Jack Kay Theatre
  - 626-seat proscenium theatre
  - Used for performances with large casts and elaborate sets
  - Fly system, theatrical lighting, and wing space
  - Adjacent scene shop
- Joseph and Alma Gildenhorn Recital Hall
  - 297-seat jewel-box theatre
    - Orchestra seating for 253 guests (24 box seats)
    - Balcony seating for 44 guests (12 box seats)
  - Bring acoustics to highlight musical performances
  - Adjustable acoustical curtain
- Dance Theatre
  - 190-seat theatre
  - Seated dinner capacity for up to 150 guests
  - Standing reception capacity for up to 200 guests
  - sprung wooden floors and retractable seats
  - It holds performances, rehearsals, lectures and workshops
- Robert and Arlene Kogod Theatre
  - This 156-seat theatre is a multipurpose black box theatre
  - Theatrical lighting system
  - Various seating configurations
  - It holds performances along with meetings and receptions
- Morris & Gwendolyn Cafritz Foundation Theatre
  - An 86-seat black box theatre
  - It holds performances, lectures, meetings, and special events
- Leah H. Smith Lecture Hall, which often hosts student recitals, and occasionally other free events such as Creative Dialogues and Talk-Backs with performers. Also used as a classroom for various different courses.
  - Built-in projector and retractable screen
