= David Bruce Smith =

American author

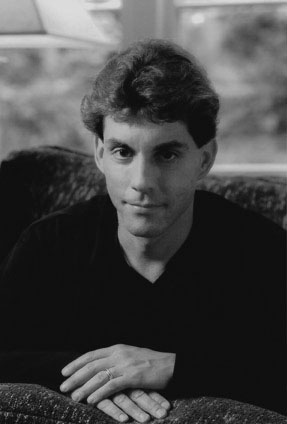
- David Bruce Smith in 2011
- Born: December 16, 1958 (age 67)
- Education: B.A. George Washington University (1979); M.A. New York University
- Occupation: Author
- Parent(s): Clarice Smith; Robert H. Smith
- Website: www.davidbrucesmith.com

David Bruce Smith (born December 16, 1958) is an author, editor, publisher and business executive based in Washington, DC. He is the founder and president of The Grateful American Foundation, an organization dedicated to restoring enthusiasm in American history for kids and adults. Smith has been a guest blogger for Maryland Humanities, the National Museum of Women in the Arts, and Historic Deerfield. He has co-authored History Matters with John Grimaldi, Ed Lengel, and Michael Bishop; newsletters for his Grateful American Foundation, and David Bruce Smith Publications.

== Early life and family ==
David Bruce Smith is the son of Robert H. Smith, a real estate developer, and Clarice Smith, an artist. His grandfather was Charles E. Smith, also a real estate developer. Smith's book Conversations with Papa Charlie: A Memory of Charles E. Smith (2000) is a memoir of the close relationship he had with his grandfather.

Smith received a Bachelor of Arts in American Literature from George Washington University in 1979. He also holds a Master of Arts in journalism from New York University.

== Career ==
Smith worked at the Charles E. Smith Realty Companies for two decades, progressing from a property management job in the residential division, to vice-president and senior vice president positions in commercial management. He then switched to a career in writing, editing, and publishing. He founded, edited and published Crystal City Magazine.

David Bruce Smith Publications was founded in 2003. The company specializes in creating, designing, and writing limited-edition books on a variety of subjects such as authors, historic figures, artists and leaders.

Smith is the author of thirteen books: In Many Arenas, 13 Young Men, Tennessee, Three Miles from Providence, Conversations with Papa Charlie, Afternoon Tea with Mom, Letters to My Children, Building the Community, Continuum, Building My Life, Souvenirs of the Riviera and the children's books American Hero: John Marshall, Chief Justice of the United States, and Abigail & John. He is also a reviewer of books for several publications. Smith also authored the preface of the American Council of Trustees and Alumni (ACTA) booklet, "No U.S. History?" in 2021 and "A Curricular Solution to the Crisis of Civic Illiteracy" in 2025.

In February 2014, he launched The Grateful American Series, an interactive multimedia program designed to restore enthusiasm in American history for children and adults.

The Grateful American Foundation, which focuses on publishing materials and producing activities for children about American History, was founded in 2014.

== Grateful American Book Prize ==
In March 2015, Smith co-founded the Grateful American Book Prize, with Dr. Bruce Cole, the former chairman of the National Endowment for the Humanities. The annual award will honor a single 7th-9th grade level work culled from fiction, historical fiction, and non-fiction entries.

The Prize consists of a $13,000 award in commemoration of the 13 original Colonies, and a lifetime membership to The New York Historical. In addition, the winner receives a silver medallion designed by the renowned artist, Clarice Smith. The two “Honorable Mentions” get $500 each and the silver medallion.

=== Past winners ===
2015 - Kathy Cannon Wiechman for her Civil War novel, Like a River, presented at President Lincoln's Cottage at the Soldiers' Home. It was the author's first book. Honorable mentions were Michaela MacColl's The Revelation of Louisa May and Darlene Beck Jacobson's Wheels of Change.

2016 - Chris Stevenson, presented at the Library of Congress for his Revolutionary War novel, The Drum of Destiny. Honorable mentions went to Michaela MacColl's and Rosemary Nichols's, Freedom's Price, and Laura Amy Schlitz's, The Hired Girl.

2017 - Margot Lee Shetterly, presented at the National Archives Building for Hidden Figures, a true story of four African American women, hired by NASA in the mid-twentieth century, to be "human" computers. Honorable mentions went to Jennifer Latham for Dreamland Burning, and Edward Cody Huddleston's, The Story of John Quincy Adams 250 Years After His Birth.

2018 - L. M. Elliott, presented at the Society of the Cincinnati for the Cold War-themed, Suspect Red. A double-winner, she also received one of the two "Honorable Mentions" for Hamilton and Peggy! A Revolutionary Friendship; the other was presented to Teri Kanefield for Andrew Jackson: The History of America.

2019 - Sonia Sotomayor, presented at the Corcoran School of the Arts and Design, Washington, DC, for her memoir, The Beloved World of Sonia Sotomayor. “Honorable Mentions" went to Henry Louis Gates Jr., and Tonya Bolden for Dark Sky Rising: Reconstruction And The Dawning Of Jim Crow, and to Mike Winchell for The Electric War: Edison, Tesla, Westinghouse, and the Race To Light The World.

2020 - Sharon Robinson, for Child of the Dream: A Memoir of 1963, presented virtually. Honorable Mentions went to Alan Gratz for Allies, and Larry Dane Brimmer for Accused! The Trials of the Scottsboro Boys: Lies, Prejudice, and the Fourteenth Amendment.

2021 - Alan Gratz for Ground Zero: A Novel of 9/11, presented virtually. Honorable Mentions went to Chris Stevenson's The Cannon of Courage: Gabriel Cooper & the Noble Train of Artillery, and Michaela MacColl's View From Pagoda Hill.

2022 - Michelle Coles for her debut novel, Black Was the Ink, presented at the Perry Belmont House. Honorable mentions went to Gail Jarrow for Ambushed! The Assassination Plot Against President Garfield, and Tonya Bolden for Speak Up! Speak Out!: The Extraordinary Life of Fighting Shirley Chisholm.

2023 - Lynn Ng Quezon for her debut novel, Mattie and the Machine, presented at the Warner Theater. Honorable mentions went to Sheila Turnage for her mystery, Island of Spies, and Sara Latta's biography, I Could Not Do Otherwise: The Remarkable Life of Dr. Mary Edwards Walker.

2024 - Stuart H. Brody for his novel, Humphrey and Me, presented at Renwick Gallery. Honorable mentions went to Lea Lyon for The Double V Campaign: African Americans Fighting for Freedom at Home and Abroad, and to Lindsey Fitzharris and Adrian Teal's Plague-Busters!: Medicine's Battles with History's Deadliest Diseases.

2025 - Laurie Halse Anderson for her historical novel, Rebellion 1776, presented at The St. Regis Washington, D.C. Honorable mention recipients were Rebecca Brenner Graham for Dear Miss Perkins: A Story of Frances Perkins’s Efforts to Aid Refugees from Nazi Germany, and Debbie Levy for A Dangerous Idea: The Scopes Trial, the Original Fight over Science in Schools.

2026 - Jennifer Robin Barr for her novel, Thunder and Mercy, presented at the Folger Shakespeare Library in Washington, D.C. Honorable mention recipients were White House Secrets: Medical Lies and Cover-Ups by Gail Jarrow and The Four Seasons of Florence Wallace by Kirstie Myvett.

== Grateful American Book Series ==
The book series concentrates on historical couples that were—in actuality—an equal partnership. The first is Abigail & John (Adams), published in August 2019.

== Philanthropy ==
Smith established a scholarship fund for undergraduate students at George Washington University.

In January 2009, Smith helped to establish "Jewish Literature Live" at George Washington University. The course on contemporary Jewish American works of literature allows students to study and interact with prominent Jewish American authors. Faye Moskowitz taught the course.

The Gettysburg Foundation began the David Bruce Smith Education Initiative in 2009, a decade of public programs and educational opportunities that highlight Abraham Lincoln's presidency and legacy. The Robert H. Smith Family Foundation supports the initiative.

== Memberships and affiliations ==
He is President of the National Institute of Psychobiology in Jerusalem, Israel, a member of the advisory board at the Sixth and I Historic Synagogue and a member of the Board of Advisors for the Washington Independent Review of Books. He co-judged Moment Magazine's Jewish Literature Award, 2012.

Smith joined the Foundation Board at the Virginia Museum of Fine Arts in 2014; in 2015, he was elected to the Board of the Smithsonian Libraries. He also served on the board of the Washington, DC Jewish Community Center, Arena Stage, and President Lincoln's Cottage. In 2017 Smith, was appointed to the History News Network Board. In 2018, Smith was elected to the board of Restless Books. Smith has been a board member of the American Council of Trustees and Alumni (ACTA) since 2017 and a board member of the Supreme Court Historical Society and the Wilmer Eye Institute at Johns Hopkins Medicine since 2022. He is also a former member of George Washington University and WETA's board of directors.

== Awards and honors ==
In 2012, Smith received the Ottenstein Award for Community Service from the Jewish Social Service Agency of Washington, D.C.

In 2013, Smith received the Hymen Goldman Humanitarian award from the Hebrew Home of Greater Washington, and an honorary fellowship from Hebrew University of Jerusalem.
