= Hartman High School =

Coordinates: 31°45′59.52″N 35°13′3.16″E

Charles E. Smith High School for Boys

Information
- Other name: Hartman High School
- Religious affiliation: Orthodox Judaism
- Grades: 7-12
- Gender: Boys
- Enrollment: 350
- Website: heb.hartman.org.il/program/hartman-boys-high-school/

Hartman High School (officially Charles E. Smith High School for Boys) is an Orthodox Jewish religious high school in Jerusalem.

== History ==
The school, affiliated with the Shalom Hartman Institute, is located in Jerusalem's German Colony. It has a student population of 350 in grades 7-12. The principal of the High School is Shaul David, and the principal of the Middle School is Channan Zuker.

Hartman describes its educational philosophy as a "dual embrace of tradition and tolerance." It is committed to the State of Israel, community action, and leadership in embracing differences. The school is considered pluralistic and liberal.

A high school for girls, Midrashiya, was established in 2007. Hartman High School also offers a special class for students with autism, Asperger's, and PDD. Volunteerism is part of the curriculum: Students deliver food baskets to needy families and visit senior citizens homes.

== See also ==
- Shalom Hartman Institute
- Education in Israel
