= Teri Kanefield =

American lawyer and writer

Teri Kanefield is an American attorney and author. A graduate of the University of California Berkeley School of Law, she specialized for twelve years in representing indigent clients on appeal from adverse rulings, a focus she often brings to her legal commentary. She passed the California bar in 2003. Her legal analyses have appeared in The Washington Post, NBC News, CNN, and other major media outlets.

Kanefield has written fiction and nonfiction books for children and young adults. The Girl from the Tar Paper School: Barbara Rose Johns and the Advent of the Civil Rights Movement (2014) won the Jane Addams Children's Book Award and Orbis Pictus Award in 2015. Other awards include the Sydney Taylor Book Award (Notable) for Rivka's Way in 2001 and the Grateful American Foundation (Honorable Mention) for Andrew Jackson which is part of her six book series The Making of America.

Kanefield's 2024 book, A Firehose of Falsehood: The Story of Disinformation, is named after the firehose of falsehood propaganda technique autocratic politicians use overwhelm and confuse their citizens and thus gain and retain power. The book reviews the history and tactics of this method of spreading disinformation through modern times. It highlights the propaganda tactics of Hitler and Mussolini, connecting historical disinformation to modern examples, such as Vladimir Putin’s use of social media to influence U.S. politics and Donald Trump’s rise through repeated falsehoods. Drawing on insights from scholars, the book ends with practical strategies, referred to as "raincoats", for resisting disinformation and strengthening democracy.

In 2025 she wrote Rebels, Robbers, and Radicals: The Story of the Bill of Rights, which examines the Bill of Rights, describing each of the ten amendments and relevant court cases associated with them. The Bill of Rights is presented as a tension between rights and equality, rooted in its origins as a compromise between Federalists and anti-Federalists. It explores the contradictions within the Bill of Rights, noting it was crafted by enslavers and only grew more inclusive through the efforts of marginalized communities. Born in St. Louis, Missouri, as of 2023 she resides in San Luis Obispo, California.

== Books (selected) ==
- Rivka's Way. Front Street/Cricket Books. 2001. ISBN 9780812628708.
- The Girl from the Tar Paper School: Barbara Rose Johns and the Advent of the Civil Rights Movement. Abrams. 2014. ISBN 9781613125175.
- The Extraordinary Suzy Wright: A Colonial Woman on the Frontier. Harry N. Abrams. 2016. ISBN 978-1-4197-1866-3.
- The Making of America: Andrew Jackson. Abrams. 2018. ISBN 9781683352952.
- The Making of America: Franklin D. Roosevelt. Harry N. Abrams. 2019. ISBN 978-1-4197-3402-1.
- A Firehose of Falsehood: The Story of Disinformation. Illustrated by Pat Dorian. First Second Books. February 13, 2024. ISBN 9781250790439.
- Rebels, Robbers, and Radicals: The Story of the Bill of Rights. Abrams Books for Young Readers. May 20, 2025. ISBN 978-1-4197-6826-2.
