= Roosevelt High School (Washington, D.C.) =

Theodore Roosevelt High School
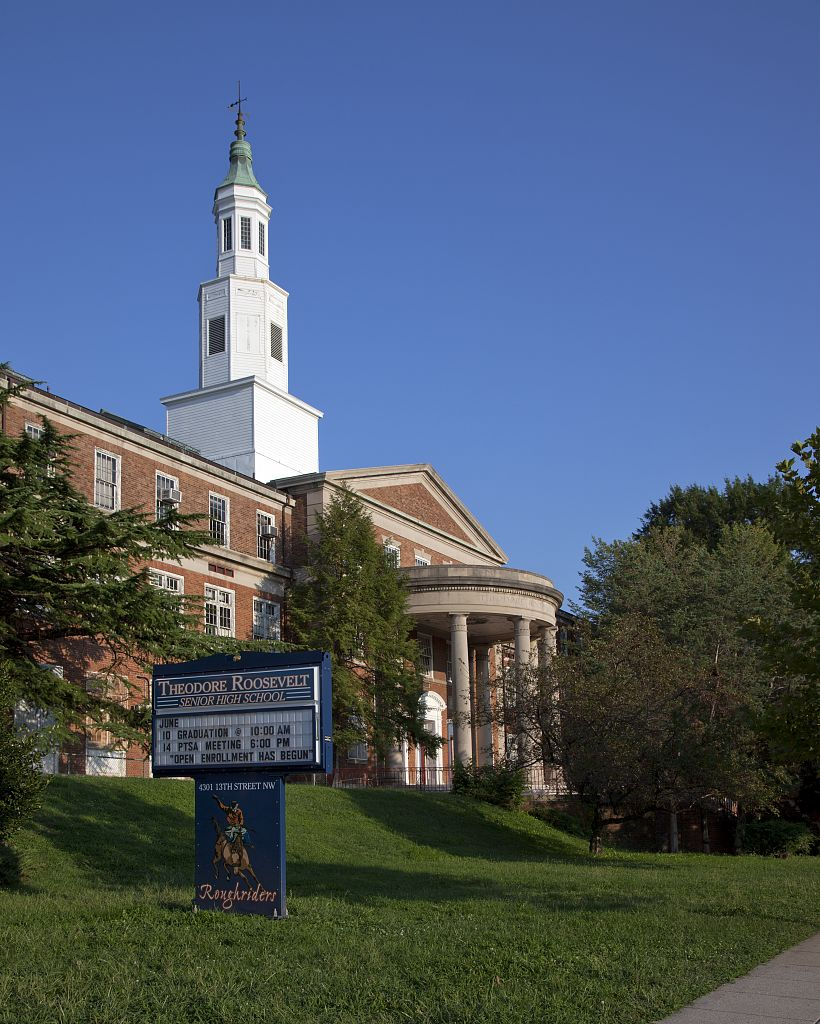

Location
- 4301 13th Street NW; Washington D.C. 20011; United States; 38°56′36″N 77°1′44″W

Information
- School type: Public high school
- Established: 1932 (94 years ago)
- Status: Open
- School board: District of Columbia State Board of Education
- School district: District of Columbia Public Schools
- NCES District ID: 1100030
- CEEB code: 090220
- NCES School ID: 110003000008
- Faculty: 74.70 (on an FTE basis)
- Grades: 9–12
- Enrollment: 752 (2020–2021)
  - Grade 9: 245
  - Grade 10: 239
  - Grade 11: 137
  - Grade 12: 131
- Student to teacher ratio: 10.07
- Campus type: Urban
- Colors: Orange and blue
- Athletics conference: District of Columbia Interscholastic Athletic Association, District of Columbia State Athletic Association
- Nickname: Rough Riders
- USNWR ranking: 13,383–17,843 (2022)
- Communities served: Ward 4
- Website: theodorerooseveltdc.org
- Theodore Roosevelt Senior High School
- U.S. National Register of Historic Places
- D.C. Inventory of Historic Sites
- Location within the District of Columbia
- Built: 1932
- Architect: Albert L. Harris
- Architectural style: Late 19th And 20th Century Revivals, Colonial Revival, Georgian Revival
- MPS: Public School Buildings of Washington, DC MPS
- NRHP reference No.: 100003213

Significant dates
- Added to NRHP: December 3, 2018
- Designated DCIHS: September 27, 2018

Theodore Roosevelt High School is a public high school operated by the District of Columbia Public Schools in the Petworth neighborhood of Ward 4 neighborhood of Northwest Washington, D.C. Roosevelt enrolls 698 students (2017–2018) in ninth through 12th grade. Additionally, the high school is also home to Roosevelt S.T.A.Y. program, an alternative academic and career/technical program that leads to a high school diploma or vocational certificate.

The high school, located at 13th and Upshur Streets NW, was built in 1932 to accommodate 1,200 students. Just before the 2016–2017 academic year, it completed a $121 million, two-year facility modernization. During the renovation period, classes were conducted at the MacFarland Middle School campus nearby at 4400 Iowa Avenue, NW. The school campus has been listed on the National Register of Historic Places.

== History ==
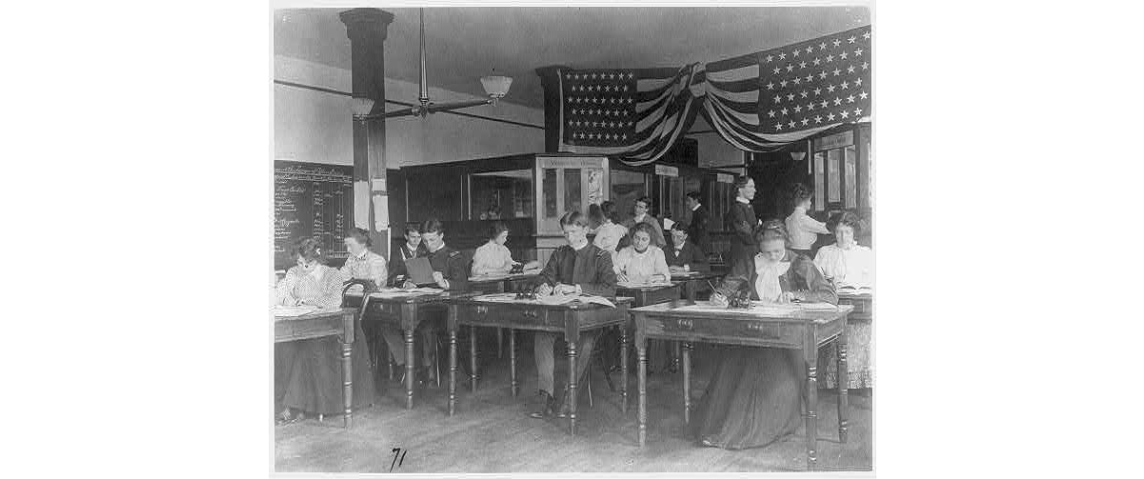
Business High School classroom circa 1899.

Plans for the school began in 1920, and it opened in 1932. The 64-room school was designed to hold 1,551 students. Alongside a regular college entrance curriculum, the school included business-oriented classes to accommodate the interests of white students who had previously been served by the Business High School at Ninth Street and Rhode Island Avenue Northwest. The business focus was in contrast to the technical focus of McKinley Technical High School and Armstrong Technical High School. The school integrated in 1953, one of the first schools in the District of Columbia to do so.

=== Uncovered New Deal artwork ===
In 1934, art students under the guidance of the Baltimore-born artist Nelson Rosenberg created a mural in the cafeteria. Titled An American Panorama, the mural was created as part of the New Deal-era Public Works of Art Project. It was later accompanied by other murals, added by later students, around the school. An American Panorama was uncovered during renovation work in the cafeteria in the fall of 2013. The fresco is currently being restored and will be incorporated into the final renovation.

== Notable alumni ==
- Ralph Asher Alpher (1921–2007), cosmologist, National Medal of Science 2005 for his research in Big Bang nucleosynthesis, and the prediction of the temperature of cosmic background radiation.
- Bertie Bowman (1931–2023), hearing coordinator of the U.S. Senate Committee on Foreign Relations
- Lennard Freeman (b. 1995), basketball player in the Israeli Basketball Premier League
- Charlene Drew Jarvis (b. 1941), educator and former scientific researcher and politician
- Shirley Ann Jackson (1964), physicist and the18th president of Rensselaer Polytechnic Institute. She is the first African-American woman to have earned a Ph.D. at the Massachusetts Institute of Technology (MIT).
- Robert P. Kogod (born 1932), business executive and philanthropist
- Bowie Kuhn (1926 –2007), Major League Baseball Commissioner
- Ted Lerner (1925–2023), principal owner of the Washington Nationals
- Van McCoy (1940-1979), record producer, arranger, songwriter, singer, and member of Van McCoy & the Soul City Symphony
- Phil Perlo (1935–1993), football linebacker with the Houston Oilers of the American Football League
- Abe Pollin (1923–2009), owner of the Washington Bullets, Washington Capitals
- Sharon Pratt (Sharon Pratt Kelly, Sharon Pratt Dixon), 1961 – DC politician (Mayor of DC, 1991 to 1995)
- Diane Rehm, 1954, American public radio talk show host
- Bill Smith, former MLB player (St. Louis Cardinals, Philadelphia Phillies)
- Kate Smith (1907–1986), singer, attended Business High School—likely class of 1924.
- Irvin Yalom, born 1931, existential psychiatrist, emeritus professor of psychiatry at Stanford University, author of fiction and nonfiction.
