= Wendy Moe =

- Education: University of Pennsylvania; Georgetown University
- Occupation: Professor at University of Maryland, College Park
- Scientific career
- Institutions: University of Maryland, College Park; University of Texas, Austin
- Doctoral advisor: Peter Fader
- Website: www.wendymoe.com

Wendy Moe is a marketing professor, and formerly the associate dean, at the Robert H. Smith School of Business at the University of Maryland. In 2013, she launched and the directed the Smith School's MS in Marketing Analytics program. She is known for her research in digital marketing, social media analytics, and customer engagement with digital content.

Moe frequently speaks to business communities, such as the Marketing Science Institute, on issues related to social media marketing and analytics. Moe's research on binge watching behavior in a streaming environment has been featured on the NPR show, The Hidden Brain hosted by Shankar Vedantam.

She is the granddaughter of Mo Xuan Yuen.

== Education ==
Moe earned a BS, MA and PhD from the Wharton School at the University of Pennsylvania and an MBA from Georgetown University.

== Books ==
- Social Media Intelligence, Cambridge University Press 2014, ISBN 9781107031203
