= IdMOC =

Integrated discrete Multiple Organ Culture (IdMOC) is an in vitro, cell culture based experimental model for the study of intercellular communication. In conventional in vitro systems, each cell type is studied in isolation ignoring critical interactions between organs or cell types. IdMOC technology is based on the concept that multiple organs signal or communicate via the systemic circulation (i.e., blood).

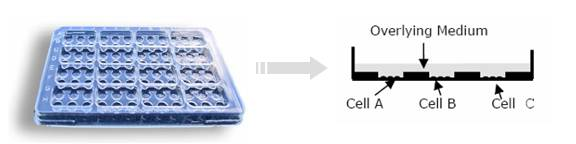
Schematic representation of an IdMOC plate

The IdMOC plate consists of multiple inner wells within a large interconnecting chamber. Multiple cell types are first individually seeded in the inner wells and, when required, are flooded with an overlying medium to facilitate well-to-well communication. Test material can be added to the overlying medium and both media and cells can be analyzed individually. Plating of hepatocytes with other organ-specific cells allows evaluation of drug metabolism and organotoxicity.

The IdMOC system has numerous applications in drug development, such as the evaluation of drug metabolism and toxicity. It can simultaneously evaluate the toxic potential of a drug on cells from multiple organs and evaluate drug stability, distribution, metabolite formation, and efficacy. By modeling multiple-organ interactions, IdMOC can examine the pharmacological effects of a drug and its metabolites on target and off-target organs as well as evaluate drug-drug interactions by measuring cytochrome P450 (CYP) induction or inhibition in hepatocytes.

IdMOC can also be used for routine and high throughput screening of drugs with desirable ADME or ADME-Tox properties. In vitro toxicity screening using hepatocytes in conjunction with other primary cells such as cardiomyocytes (cardiotoxicity model), kidney proximal tubule epithelial cells (nephrotoxicity model), astrocytes (neurotoxicity model), endothelial cells (vascular toxicity model), and airway epithelial cells (pulmonary toxicity model) is invaluable to the drug design and discovery process.

The IdMOC was patented by Dr. Albert P. Li in 2004.

== See also ==
- Cytochrome P450
- Drug metabolism
- Pharmacology
- Toxicology
