= Peter Morici =

American economist

- Born: Peter George Morici Jr. December 9, 1948 (age 77); New York City, U.S.

Academic background
- Education: State University of New York at Albany (PhD) (1974)

Academic work
- Discipline: Macroeconomics
- Institutions: University of Maryland

Peter George Morici Jr. (born December 9, 1948) is an American economist and professor emeritus (retired) of International Business at the R.H. Smith School of Business at the University of Maryland, College Park. He is a graduate of SUNY Albany in New York State, where he received his Ph.D. in economics in 1974. He is a nationally syndicated columnist, with his articles appearing in publications such as The Washington Times, The Hill, Townhall.com, and Newsmax. Morici has appeared as a guest on Newsmax TV and Fox News Channel.

== Career ==
From 1974 to 1976, Morici taught at Augsburg College in Minneapolis. In 1976, he joined the Federal Energy Administration. In 1978 he moved to the National Planning Association in Washington, where he was elected a vice president in 1983. He joined the University of Maine as a professor of economics in 1988 and was director of its Canadian-American Center from 1990 to 1993. He also served as chief economist at the U.S. International Trade Commission. Morici is the author of 18 books.

From 1995 to 2017, he was a professor of international business at the University of Maryland and since has retired from teaching. He is now an emeritus professor.

Morici is also a columnist, and his work appears frequently in The Washington Times, Newsmax and other major newspapers, and he appears frequently on the BBC, SiriusXM POTUS Channel 124, Fox News and Fox Financial Network and other major outlets.

He participates in surveys of economic forecasters conducted by Reuters and other major news services, and is a seven-time winner of MarketWatch best forecaster award.

Morici made headlines in a July 2014 piece in The Hill, where he argued that the unemployment rate failed to take into account abuses in H-1B immigration visas and students who would be in the workforce but they were "duped" into enrolling in "useless programs" due to the prevalence of financial aid. Taking those circumstances into account, the real unemployment rate was 18%. This figure was quoted by Donald Trump in a speech on June 16, 2015, where Trump announced he was running for president.

== Selected publications ==
- Reconciling Trade and the Environment in the World Trade Organization
- Labor Standards in the Global Trading System
- Antitrust in the Global Trading System: Reconciling U.S., Japanese and EU Approaches
- Setting U.S. Goals for WTO Negotiations
- The Trade Deficit: Where Does It Come from and What Does It Do
- Free Trade in the Americas: An Architecture for Hemispheric Integration
- Trade Talks with Mexico: A Time for Realism
- Making Free Trade Work: The Canada-U.S. Agreement
- Reassessing American Competitiveness
