= Lemma Senbet Fund =

American student-managed investment fund

- Formation: 2006; 20 years ago
- Founder: University of Maryland endowment fund
- Purpose: Education of future fund managers
- Official language: English
- Owner: University of Maryland
- Students: 12 undergraduates from Robert H. Smith School of Business chosen each year
- Website: www.rhsmith.umd.edu/funds/senbet-fund

The Lemma Senbet Fund is the largest student managed investments fund by endowment in the U.S. It's offered as a limited-enrollment year-round experiential learning course to top tier undergraduate students from the Robert H. Smith School of Business at the University of Maryland (UMD). Each student in the fund gets to manage around $2.3 million as of 2023.

== History ==
The fund, named for Lemma Wolde Senbet, the William E. Mayer Chair Professor of Finance at the Smith School of the University of Maryland, was founded in 2006 with initial capital of US$50,000 from the school's endowment fund.

Since founding in 2006, even after annual distributions the Lemma Senbet Fund has grown 18-fold from $50,000 to $1.8 Million (fiscal year ended Dec 31, 2022).

== Governance structure ==
The investment management team consists of 12 undergraduate students chosen through an interview and presentation process designed to simulate the hiring process of investment banking firms. The team consists of 2 portfolio managers and 10 equity analysts each dedicated to a specific industry sector: consumer products (discretionary), consumer products (staples), energy, financial services, healthcare, industrials, information technology, materials, telecommunications, and utilities. Each sector analyst pitches approximately 4 stocks per year, and must persuade all 12 members (not just a majority) of the investment team to buy. The student investment management team uses Bloomberg Professional Services running on Bloomberg Terminals to conduct in-depth financial analysis, manage the asset portfolio, and execute security trades. The students are unpaid, and do not share in the fund gains nor receive distributions.

== Investment strategy ==
The long-term performance goal of the Lemma Senbet Fund is to outpace appreciation of the S&P 500 Index on a risk-adjusted basis. Historically, the fund has adopted a top-down investment approach that is driven by Economic indicators, then Industry trends, and finally individual Company performance (EIC). Most asset instruments are long equity positions. Specific stock selections are based on a combination of fundamental analysis and technical analysis valuation techniques under the Growth at a Reasonable Price (GARP) model.

== Fund Distributions ==
The Lemma Senbet fund pays a 5% distribution to the University of Maryland Deans Office each year. In 2017, this distribution amounted to $37,729.
