= Clarice Smith =

American painter (1933–2021)

- Smith in 1996
- Born: Clarice Chasen; January 16, 1933; Washington D.C.
- Died: December 9, 2021 (aged 88); Arlington, Virginia
- Education: Corcoran School of the Arts and Design MFA in 1979 from George Washington University
- Occupation: Painter
- Spouse: Robert H. Smith
- Children: Michelle Smith; David Bruce Smith; Stephen Smith (predeceased)

Clarice Smith (January 16, 1933 – December 9, 2021) was an American painter and portraitist whose paintings have appeared in a number of exhibitions in the United States and Europe. With her husband, Robert H. Smith, Clarice Smith engaged in philanthropy, especially at the University of Maryland, where the Clarice Smith Performing Arts Center is named for her, and at George Washington University, where the couple endowed the Smith Hall of Art. They also initiated a distinguished lecture series at the Smithsonian Museum of American Art.

== Education ==
Born Clarice Chasen to a Jewish family on January 16, 1933 in Washington, D.C., Smith studied art at the Corcoran School of the Arts and Design and the University of Maryland. She received her MFA in 1979 from George Washington University, where she taught as a member of faculty from 1980 to 1987. Smith, who described herself as a "lifelong learner," cited a "Methods and Materials" class at George Washington University, "where she first learned about paints," as the beginning of her career as an artist. In 2012 she received an honorary doctorate from George Washington University, and in 2015 was awarded a Doctorate of Humane Letters from the University of Maryland.

== Career ==
Smith worked as a professional painter for forty years, and exhibited in group and solo exhibitions in both the United States and abroad, in the United Kingdom, France, Switzerland, the Netherlands, and Israel. Among her most notable exhibitions are those at the National Museum of Women in the Arts (2009), Virginia Museum of Fine Arts (2011), and the New York Historical Society (2013). In 2016 her work was paired with that of the sculptor Albert Paley for an exhibition at the Kreeger Museum in Washington, DC. Her painting Big Race (2001) is in the permanent collection of the Smithsonian American Art Museum.

She also published several written works along with her son David Bruce Smith. They include Afternoon Tea with Mom, a collection of her paintings; Three Miles from Providence, historical fiction about Abraham Lincoln; Continuum, a collection of Venetian paintings for the National Museum for Women in the Arts; and Tennessee, a collection of unpublished Tennessee Williams plays.

== Death ==
Smith died at her home in Arlington, Virginia on December 9, 2021.
