= Albert P. Li =

Pioneer in human hepatocyte research for drug development and safety

Albert P. Li is president and CEO of In Vitro ADMET Laboratories (IVAL), Columbia, Maryland, and Malden, Massachusetts. For the past three decades, Li has devoted his scientific career to the advancement of scientific concepts and technologies to accurately predict human drug properties. His research is focused on the development and application of human-based in vitro experimental systems in drug discovery and development. He is a pioneer in the isolation, cryopreservation, and culturing of human hepatocytes and their application in the evaluation of drug metabolism, drug-drug interactions, and drug toxicity.

== Early life and education ==
Albert Li was born and raised in Hong Kong. He attended St. Francis Xavier's College, Tai Kok Tsui, where he excelled, particularly in the sciences. After being awarded a scholarship from the University of Wisconsin–Stevens Point in 1969, he immigrated to the United States and in 1972 obtained a bachelor's degree in chemistry, with a minor in biology. He went on to complete a Ph.D. in biochemical sciences in 1976 at the University of Tennessee, working with the Biology Division of the Oak Ridge National Laboratory.

Li also holds an executive MBA from the University of Maryland, College Park (2002).

== Career ==
Li has held a variety of research and teaching positions throughout the biomedical field. After graduating from the University of Tennessee, Li took up a post as a research scientist and assistant professor at the University of New Mexico's Cancer Research and Treatment Center (1977–1979). This was followed by a position as associate scientist and group leader in cellular and genetic toxicology with the Lovelace Biomedical and Environmental Research Institute (1979–1982). From there, Li joined the Monsanto Company as a senior research toxicologist. He stayed with Monsanto until 1993, eventually becoming senior fellow and head of two departments – Liver Biology and Pharmokinetics, Bioanalytics, and Radiochemistry. Other notable positions include director of the Surgical Research Institute of the Saint Louis University School of Medicine (1993–1995) and chief scientific officer of In Vitro Technologies, Inc. (now owned by Celsis), Baltimore, Maryland (1998–2002).

In addition to his work in the industry, Li has also taken on a variety of academic positions, including distinguished visiting professor at the Institute of Chemical Carcinogenesis (Guangzhou Medical College), adjunct professor of pharmacology and physiology (Saint Louis University School of Medicine), and affiliate professor of chemical engineering (McKelvey School of Engineering at Washington University in St. Louis).

== IVAL ==
In 2004, Li founded In Vitro ADMET Laboratories (IVAL), a product supplier and preclinical contract research organization. Specializing in in vitro testing, IVAL provides products and services to pharmaceutical development laboratories across the globe.

After establishing IVAL, Li was the first to report successful cryopreservation of human hepatocytes to retain their viability, functions, and ability to be cultured (plateable cryopreserved human hepatocytes). Li and his researchers have developed numerous hepatocyte-based assays, including higher throughput assays for P450 inhibition, time-dependent inhibition, P450 induction, cytokine suppression of ADME gene expression, and in vitro hepatotoxicity.

== IdMOC ==
In 2007, Li patented the Integrated Discrete Multiple Organ Co-Culture system (IdMOC), a method that models in vivo multiple-organ interaction in vitro. This cell culture system is based on the "wells-in-a-well" concept and offers a far more complete experimental system than traditional isolated cell culture platforms, which use only one cell type. It consists of a testing plate with multiple, inner wells grouped within a surrounding chamber. Individual wells can be seeded with cell types from different organs. They are then covered and connected by an overlying medium, allowing well-to-well communication, while keeping the individual cell types separate. The IdMOC system is patented internationally.

== Publications ==
Li has published over 160 research articles, book chapters, and reviews and co-edited 5 books in toxicology and drug-drug interactions. He is on the editorial board for various journals, including Current Drug Metabolism, Drug Metabolism Letters, Chemico-Biological Interactions, Journal of Toxicological Sciences, and Toxicology and Cell Biology.

Notable publications include:

1. Li A. P. (2005) Preclininical in vitro screening assays for drug-like properties. Drug Discovery Today 2, 179–195.
2. Li, A. P. (2008) In vitro evaluation of metabolic drug-drug interactions: concepts and practice. In A.P. Li (Ed.), Drug-drug Interactions in Pharmaceutical Development (1–30). New Jersey: John Wiley and Sons.
3. Li, A. P. (2009) Evaluation of luciferin-isopropyl acetal as a CYP3A4 substrate for human hepatocytes: effects of organic solvents, cytochrome P450 (P450) inhibitors, and P450 inducers. Drug Metab Dispos. 37(8),1598-603.
4. Li, A. P. (2009) Metabolism Comparative Cytotoxicity Assay (MCCA) and Cytotoxic Metabolic Pathway Identification Assay (CMPIA) with cryopreserved human hepatocytes for the evaluation of metabolism-based cytotoxicity in vitro: proof-of-concept study with aflatoxin B1. Chem Biol Interact. 179(1), 4–8.
5. Li, A. P. and Doshi U. (2011) Higher Throughput Screening Assays for CYP3A4 Inhibition and Induction in Human Hepatocytes. J. Biomol. Screen. 16(8), 903–909.
6. Li, A. P. and Doshi U. (2011) Higher Throughput Screening Assays for Time-Dependent Inhibition of CYP3A4 in Human Hepatocytes. Drug Metabolism Letters 5(3), 183-191(9).
7. Li, A. P., Uzgare A., LaForge Y. (2012) Definition of metabolism-dependent xenobiotic toxicity with co-cultures of human hepatocytes and mouse 3T3 fibroblasts in the novel integrated discrete multiple organ co-culture (IdMOC) experimental system: Results with model toxicants aflatoxin B1, cyclophosphamide and tamoxifen. Chem. Biol. Interact. 199, (1–8).
8. Li, A.P., Yang Q., Vermet H., Raoust N., Klieber S., and Fabre G. (2014) Evaluation of Human Hepatocytes Under Prolonged Culture in a Novel Medium for the Maintenance of Hepatic Differentiation: Results with the Model Pro-inflammatory Cytokine Interleukin 6. Drug Metabolism Letters 8(1), 12–18.
9. Li, A. P. (2012) Editorial: metabolism and drug-drug interaction potential of biotherapeutics. Current Drug Metabolism 13, 881.
10. Li, A. P. (2014) In vitro human hepatocyte-based experimental systems for early identification of drugs and drug candidates with adverse drug properties and biomarker discovery. Biomarkers Med. 8, 1–11.
11. Proctor W.R., Chakraborty M., Korrapati M.C., Morrison J.C., Berkson J.D., Semple K., Chea L.S., Yang Q., Li A.P., Ryan P.M., Spolski R., Leonard W.J., Bourdi M., and Pohl, L.R. (2014) Thymic Stromal Lymphopoietin and Interleukin-4 Mediate the Pathogenesis of Drug-Induced Liver Injury in Mice. Hepatology 60, 1741–1752.

== Patents ==
Li currently holds six patents:

- Biological Artificial Liver: U.S. Patent No. 5,270,192; filed 02/07/92; allowable June 1993, published Dec. 1993.
- Artificial liver apparatus and method: U.S. Patent No. 6,858,146; filed 02/20/02; allowed and published Feb. 22, 2005.
- Cell Culture Tool and Method: U.S. Patent No. US 7,186,548 B2; Date of Patent: March 6, 2007.
- Cell Culture Tool and Method: The People's Republic of China Patent No. 626030; Date of Patent: May 26, 2010.
- Cell Culture Tool and Method: Japan Patent No. 4609799; allowed in September 2010.
- Cell Preparation Method: U.S. Patent No. 9,078,430; filed Sept 10, 2013; allowed and published March 12, 2015
