= Student managed investments =

A student managed investment fund is a pool of money which business students invest as a learning experience. As of 2008, more than 200 universities in the United States have student-run funds, which vary in size from several hundred thousand dollars to millions of dollars.

The funds to be managed come from various sources, such as gifts from private individuals and corporations, gifts from foundations, and from university endowment or foundation assets. Some student managed investment funds such as the University of Texas at Austin manage funds for private clients, who are accredited investors under U.S. securities laws. Another source is the loan that supplies the funds at Cameron University.

Some student managed investment funds are organized by function (accounting, public relations, etc.), while others such as the Lemma Senbet Fund are organized by economic sectors (Consumer Products, Energy Industry, Information technology, etc.).

The business students managing the fund typically take a for-credit course in conjunction with their management duties. Many of these programs belong to the Association of Student Managed Investment Programs.

In addition to managing a portfolio, these classes provide related experiences relevant to being a professional fund manager. For example, the CFA Society of Orange County Foundation (CFAOCF) conducts an annual request for proposals competition which allows student teams from local universities to experience first-hand the process that fund managers must go through in order to be allowed to manage institutional funds.

Outside the United States there is Protege Ventures, a student managed investment fund programme that only invests in companies founded by students. The programme was launched in 2017 by Singapore Management University Institute of Innovation and Entrepreneurship and Entrepreneurship community Kairos Asean, and is currently the only student managed investment fund operating in Southeast Asia. In 2023 it announced the launch of Fund II, a S$500,000 fund for trained student investors to invest in early-stage technology startups.

Trinity College Dublin established the first European student managed fund in 2011.

== See also ==
- Student Investment Advisory Service
