= Sias, West Virginia =

- Unincorporated community
- Location within West Virginia Location within the United States
- Coordinates: 38°11′05″N 82°05′14″W
- Country: United States
- State: West Virginia
- County: Lincoln
- Elevation: 679 ft (207 m)
- Time zone: UTC-5 (Eastern (EST))
  - Summer (DST): UTC-4 (EDT)
- ZIP codes: 25563
- Area codes: 304 & 681
- GNIS feature ID: 1555621

Sias is an unincorporated community in Lincoln County, West Virginia, United States. Sias is located on the Mud River and County Routes 7 and 46, 6.5 miles (10.5 km) south of Hamlin. Sias had a post office, which closed on February 1, 1997.

Tradition has it the name is a corruption of the word "ice", but Hamill Kenny proposes the town instead may be named after the Sias family. Possibly Civil War veteran Andrew Lewis Sias, who had owned 87 1/2 acres in the area and became famous for returning to work even after being held hostage and still injured from the war and his tortures.
