= Charles E. Smith Center =

Multipurpose arena in Washington, D.C.

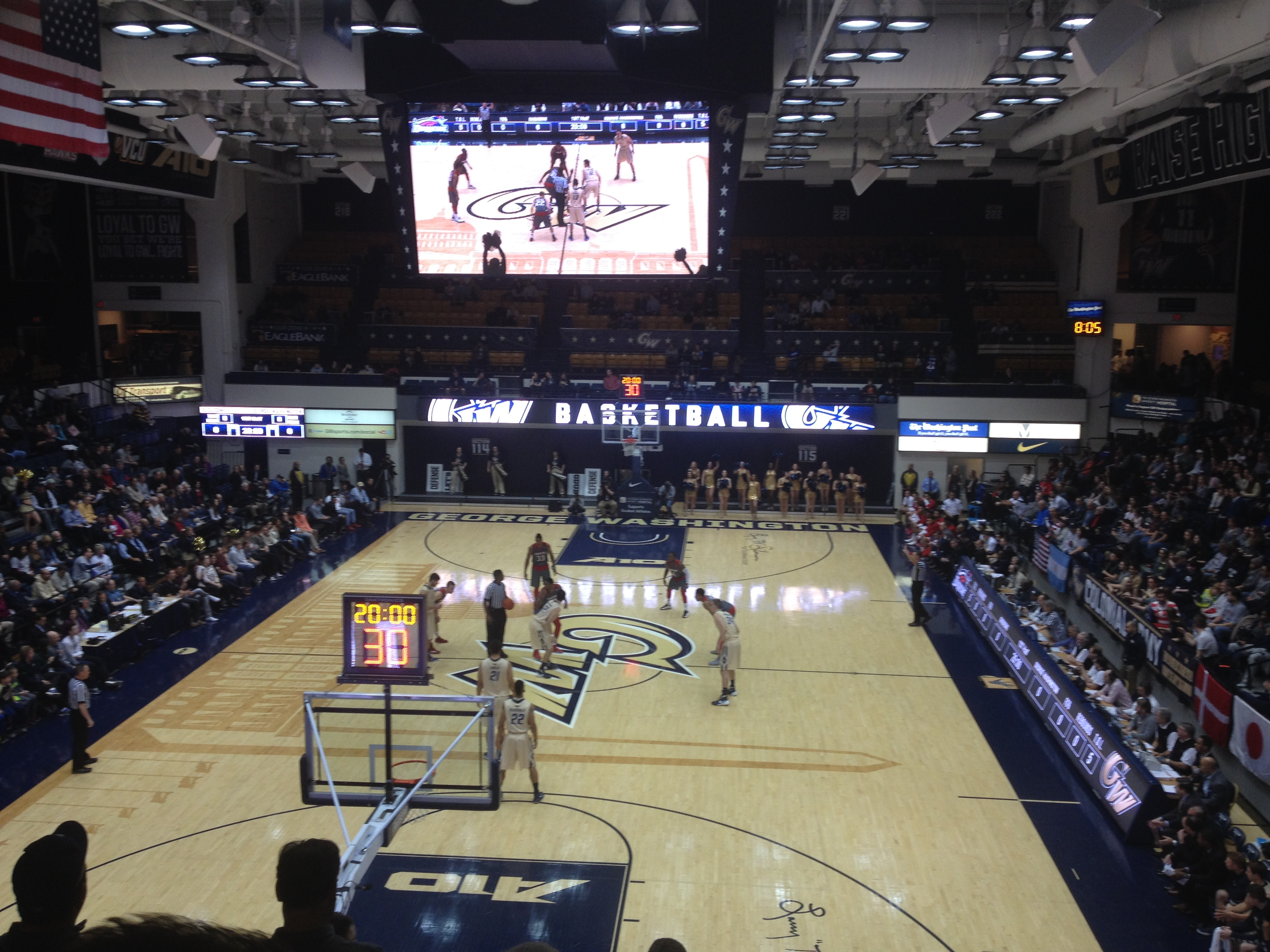
- The Smith Center in January 2016
- Interactive map of Charles E. Smith Center
- Location: 600 22nd Street Northwest; Washington, D.C. 20052 U.S.
- Coordinates: 38.897755°N 77.049329°W
- Owner: George Washington University
- Operator: George Washington University
- Capacity: 5,000
- Surface: Hardwood

Construction
- Opened: November 17, 1975
- Cost: $5 million ($29.9 million in 2025 dollars)

Tenants
- George Washington Colonials (Basketball, volleyball & gymnastics); Washington Kastles (WTT) (2014–2018); Washington Mystics (WNBA) (2018 Playoffs)

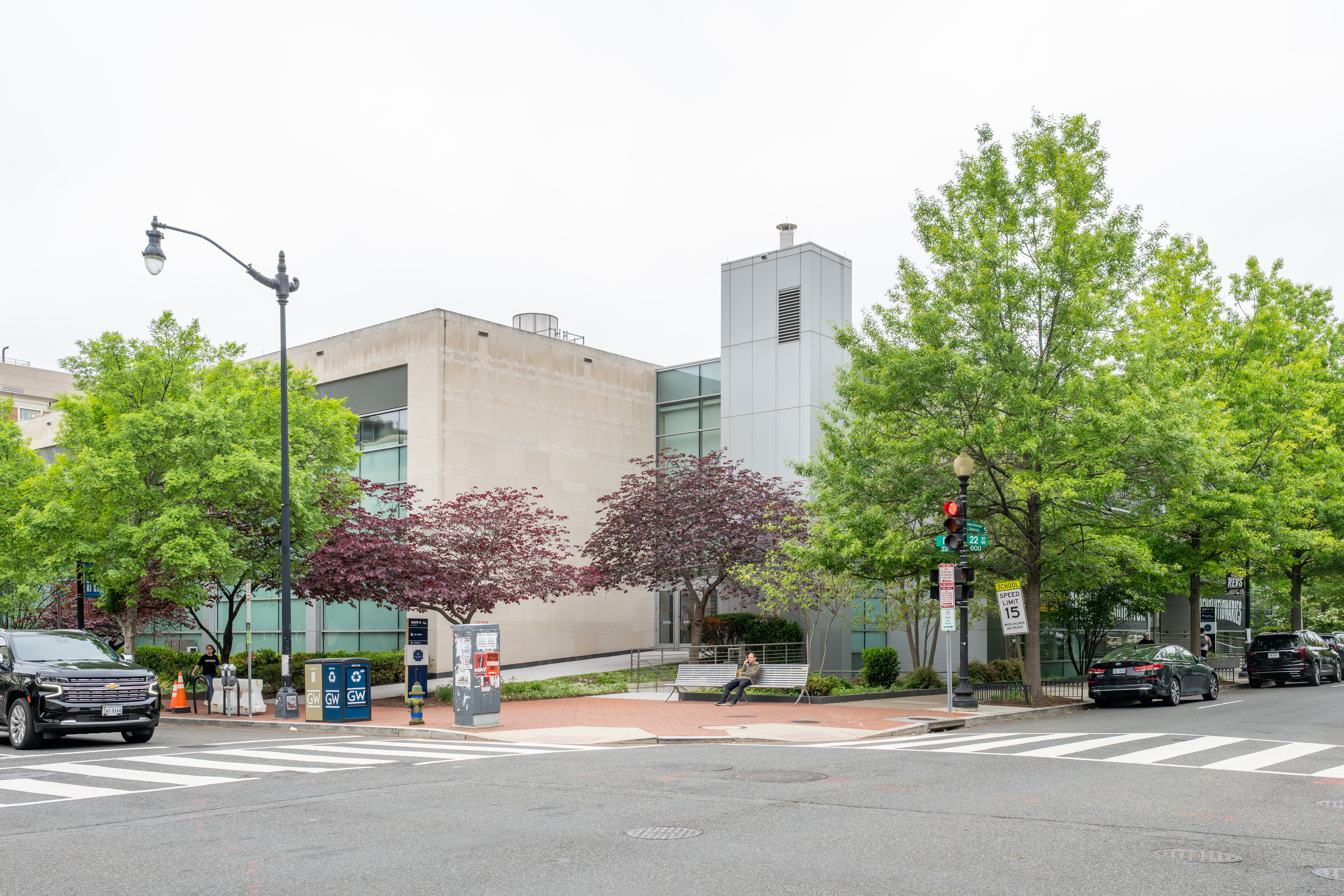
Exterior of Charles E. Smith Center (2026)

The Charles E. Smith Center is a 5,000-seat multipurpose arena in Washington, D.C. Opened on November 17, 1975, it is home to the George Washington Revolutionaries men's and women's basketball teams, as well as the university's swimming, water polo, gymnastics, and volleyball teams. From 2014 to 2018, it was the home of the Washington Kastles of World TeamTennis. Smith Center also became the temporary home of the Washington Mystics as they made a run at a WNBA Championship in 2018. Smith Center is located on the main George Washington campus in Foggy Bottom, on the block bounded by 22nd and 23rd and F and G Streets NW. The arena also has hosted concerts and includes practice courts, a swimming pool, a weight room, and athletic department offices.

The building was named for Charles E. Smith, who was a university trustee and chairman of the Committee on University Development.

A $43 million update and expansion of the Smith Center began in February 2008, due in part to a $10 million gift from the family of Charles E. Smith. Renovations were finished before the start of the 2010-2011 Basketball season.

On September 11, 2018, the Smith Center's Jumbotron collapsed onto the court below while undergoing maintenance. No one was injured in the incident, possibly due to the Jumbotron's already-lowered position before the fall.

== Events ==
- PFL 3, a mixed martial arts event was held at the arena on July 5, 2018.

== See also ==
- List of NCAA Division I basketball arenas
