= Student Investment Advisory Service =

Student Investment Advisory Service (SIAS Fund) is type of student managed investments fund and part of Simon Fraser University (SFU) Endowment Portfolio managed by Master of Science in Finance program candidates at SFU business school.

The fund follows a value investing mandate, set by the client (the SFU Treasurer, Mr. Michael Murdock) through a conservative Investment Policy Statement (IPS). The SIAS portfolio is composed of four actively managed asset classes: Cash, Canadian Equity, Global Equity and Fixed Income. At the beginning of the program (academic year), candidates (investment managers) go through extensive training via three sources: (1) the previous SIAS cohort, (2) faculty members and most importantly, (3) a group of elite industry professionals, before they are handed down the power. Additionally, the new investment managers are immediately grouped into six managing teams, namely Economics and Strategy, Canadian Equity, Global Equity, Fixed Income, and Risk Metrics. The activities of each team are closely monitored by the sixth team; compliance and performance, in accordance to the IPS. This team generates monthly compliance and performance reports for the fund which is sent to the clients and the faculty advisors. The fund also holds quarterly performance review presentations before a panel of industry advisors; a few of B.C's preeminent portfolio managers, which are open to the public

As one of the largest student managed funds in North America, SIAS was awarded the best student-run value investment fund in North America in 2007 and 2012 based on performance by RISE (recognized by Businessweek). SFU's endowment portfolio is among the top 25% largest endowments in North America. As active contributors to managing SIAS; $11 million of SFU's large endowment portfolio, FRM candidates also provide mentorship to a number of well qualified and trained SFU finance undergraduate students in their role as associate analyst for the fund.

== See also ==
- Financial risk management
