= Chen Ming-jer =

Taiwanese business and management academic

- 陳明哲
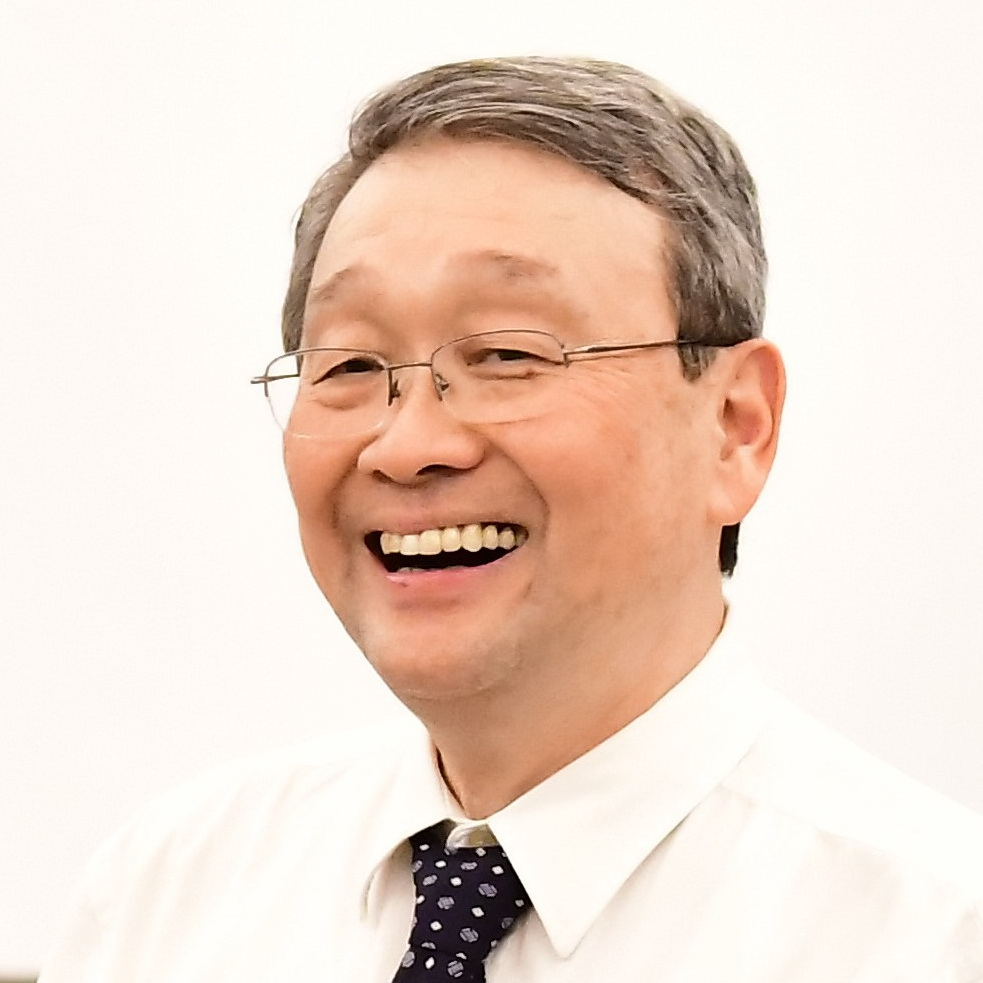
- Born: 1954 (age 71–72); Taitung County, Taiwan
- Education: National Chung Hsing University (BS); National Taiwan Normal University (MEd); University of Maryland, College Park (MBA, PhD)
- Scientific career
- Fields: Management science
- Institutions: Wharton School of the University of Pennsylvania; University of Virginia Darden School of Business

Chen Ming-jer (Chinese: 陳明哲; pinyin: Chén Míngzhé; Pe̍h-ōe-jī: Tân Bêng-tiat; born 1954) is a Taiwanese management scientist. He is the Leslie E. Grayson Professor of Business Administration at the University of Virginia Darden School of Business.

== Early life and education ==
Chen was born and raised in rural Taitung. At age 17, he left Taitung to attend college.

Chen graduated from National Chung Hsing University with a Bachelor of Science (B.S.) in business management in 1976 and obtained a Master of Education (M.Ed.) specializing in public administration from National Taiwan Normal University in 1979. He then completed doctoral studies in the United States, earning a Master of Business Administration (M.B.A.) in 1985 and his Ph.D. in management science (strategic management) in 1988, both from the University of Maryland, College Park.

== Career ==
Chen began his teaching career at Columbia University and was a faculty member at Wharton School of the University of Pennsylvania starting in 1997. He is the Leslie E. Grayson Professor of Business Administration at University of Virginia Darden School of Business.

== Awards and honors ==
Chen is a fellow of the Academy of Management and served as the group's 68th president in 2013. He is a fellow of the Strategic Management Society.

== Personal life ==
Chen lives in Charlottesville, Virginia, with his wife and two sons.

== Works ==
=== Books ===
- Inside Chinese Business: A Guide for Managers Worldwide (2001)
- Competitive Dynamics: A Research Odyssey (2009)
