= Jewish Social Service Agency =

US non-profit organization

- Abbreviation: JSSA
- Formation: June 8, 1942; 83 years ago
- Merger of: United Hebrew Charities, Hebrew Relief Society
- Tax ID no.: 53-0196598
- Legal status: 501(c)(3) non-profit organization
- Headquarters: Rockville, Maryland, United States
- Services: Provides services and support to more than 30,000 individuals annually through a wide range of counseling, educational, special needs services, in-home support, hospice and nursing care, and social services.
- President: Lawrence P. Kline
- Chief Executive Officer: Todd Schenk
- Subsidiaries: Route 28 Associates, Premier Homecare Inc
- Revenue: $18,981,490 (2013)
- Expenses: $18,560,878 (2013)
- Endowment: $38,773,629
- Employees: 227 (2013)
- Volunteers: 900 (2013)
- Website: www.jssa.org

Jewish Social Service Agency provides nonsectarian services including temporary home care for people in recovery, consultation for long-term care planning, and case management. It also offers Asperger syndrome–specific therapy for individuals of any religion and a parent support group. It has helped immigrants adjust to living in the United States, including finding schooling for their children, teaching English, and training of vocational skills. Jewish Social Service Agency offers programs on dealing with anxiety and stress resulting from war. In 2013, it partnered with Yachad and American Jewish Society for Service to develop and implement a curriculum that helps people understand what it is like to live with a disability and how important social services are to people in need of help.

== History ==
In 1921, two Washington-based charities, United Hebrew Charities and the Hebrew Relief Society, merged into one organization, which was later renamed Jewish Social Service Agency. The organization operated in the basement of the District of Columbia's Community Chest organization.

In 1940, Jewish Social Service Agency moved to 1131 Spring Road NW in the neighborhood of Petworth. It leased the space from Hebrew Home for the Aged for one dollar.

In 1969, Jewish Social Service Agency moved to a new complex on Montrose Road in Rockville, Maryland, along with the Jewish Community Center of Greater Washington and the renamed Hebrew Home of Greater Washington. It operates in the Ina Building; Jack and Ina Kay were long-time donors.
