= University of Maryland College of Arts and Humanities =

Liberal arts college at the University of Maryland

Coordinates: 38.98496°N 76.94272°W

College of Arts and Humanities
- Type: Public
- Established: 1917
- Parent institution: University of Maryland, College Park
- Location: 1102 Francis Scott Key Hall, College Park, MD
- Website: arhu.umd.edu

The College of Arts and Humanities is a college of the University of Maryland, College Park. It is a liberal arts program that studies human experience, thought, expression, and creativity. It was one of the seven schools established in 1917 by Albert F. Woods.

The College of Arts and Humanities consists of 11 academic departments, 3 schools and more than a dozen institutes, centers and galleries. It offers with 30 academic majors and 39 academic minors. There are 2,525 undergraduate and graduate majors. The College of Arts and Humanities is housed within 12 academic buildings on campus. The college itself is located in Francis Scott Key Hall.

== Departments ==
University of Maryland College of Arts and Humanities Departments and Degree Programs
Department	Students Enrolled	Majors	Minors	Certificates
American Studies	61	American Studies	U.S. Latina/o Studies	N/A
Art	215	Art	N/A	N/A
Art History and Archaeology	21	Art History	Art History; Archaeology	N/A
Classical Languages and Literature	12	Classics	Archaeology; Classical Mythology; Greek Language and Culture; Latin Language and Culture	N/A
Communication	738	Communication	Rhetoric	N/A
English Language and Literature	356	English; Film Studies	Creative Writing; Professional Writing; Rhetoric	N/A
History	198	History; Central European, Russian and Eurasian Studies	History; Middle Eastern Studies	East Asian Studies
Jewish Studies	4	Jewish Studies	Hebrew Studies; Israel Studies; Jewish Studies; Religious Studies	N/A
Linguistics	73	Linguistics	Linguistics	N/A
Philosophy	64	Philosophy; Philosophy, Politics, and Economics	Philosophy	N/A
School of Languages, Literatures, and Cultures	193	Arabic Studies; Chinese; Film Studies; French Language and Literature; Germanic Studies; Italian Studies; Japanese; Persian Studies; Romance Languages; Russian Language and Literature; Spanish Language, Literatures, and Cultures	Arabic; Chinese Language; French Studies; Germanic Language, Literature and Culture; Hebrew Studies; Italian Culture and Language; Japanese; Korean Studies; Persian Studies; Portuguese Language, Literature, and Culture; Russian Studies; Spanish Heritage Language and Latina/o Culture; Spanish Language, Culture, and Professional Contexts; Spanish Literature, Linguistics, and Culture	East Asian Studies
School of Music	165	Music	Music and Culture; Music Performance	N/A
School of Theatre, Dance, and Performance Studies	128	Dance; Theatre	N/A	N/A
Women's Studies	22	Women's Studies	Black Women's Studies; Lesbian, Gay, Bisexual and Transgender Studies	Lesbian, Gay, Bisexual and Transgender Studies; Women's Studies

== Leadership ==
=== Dean ===
The dean of the College of Arts and Humanities is Stephanie Shonekan. Shonekan assumed the position of dean in 2022, and succeeded Bonnie Thorton Dill who served as dean from 2011-2022.

== Rankings ==
The University of Maryland, College Park was ranked #52 in arts and humanities by U.S. News and #82 in the World University Ranking for arts and humanities.

== Notable alumni ==
- Carmen Balthrop, opera singer
- Gail Berman, American businesswoman
- Larry David, American comedian, writer, actor, and television producer
- Jim Henson, American puppeteer
- Munro Leaf, American children's author and illustrator
- Liz Lerman, American choreographer
