= Crystal City, Virginia =

Crystal City, Arlington, Virginia
- Neighborhood
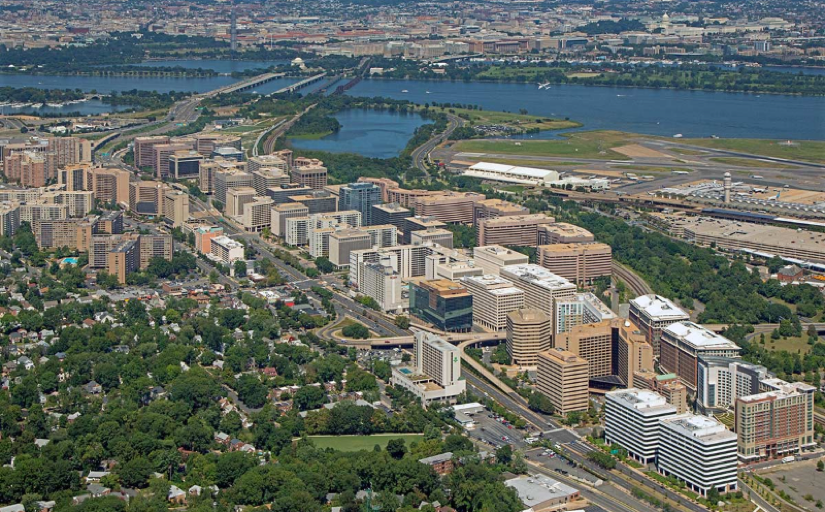
- An aerial view of Crystal City, with the Potomac River and Washington, D.C. in the background, September 2020

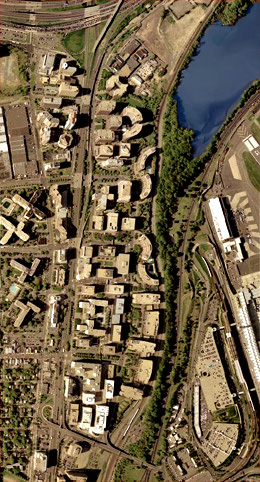
- A satellite image of Crystal City with U.S. Route 1 (left), Reagan National Airport (bottom right), the George Washington Memorial Parkway (center), I-395 (top left), and VA Route 233/Airport Viaduct (bottom) in 2002
- Coordinates: 38°51′5.05″N 77°3′2.48″W
- Country: United States
- State: Virginia
- County: Arlington
- Established: 1963

Population (2010)
  - Total: 22,543
- Time zone: UTC−5 (EST)
  - Summer (DST): UTC−4 (EDT)
- ZIP Code: 22202
- Area codes: 703, 571
- Website: arlingtonva.us/crystal-city

Crystal City is an urban neighborhood in the southeastern corner of Arlington County, Virginia, approximately three miles (5 km) south of Downtown Washington, D.C. Due to its extensive integration of access to office buildings, residential high-rise buildings, and stores using underground corridors, it is possible to travel much of the neighborhood without going above ground, making part of Crystal City an underground city.

Crystal City hosts several aerospace manufacturing and defense industry companies, public sector consulting firms, government contractors, satellite offices for the Pentagon, and nonprofit organizations, including the International Foundation for Electoral Systems and the national headquarters for PBS.

== Cityscape ==
Crystal City is centered along a stretch of U.S. Route 1, also known as Richmond Highway, just south of the Pentagon, east of Pentagon City, and within walking distance of Ronald Reagan Washington National Airport, the busiest of the three major airports in the Washington metropolitan area. Characterized as one of several urban villages by Arlington County, Crystal City is almost exclusively populated by high-rise apartment buildings, corporate offices, hotels, and shops and restaurants. There was an extensive network of underground shopping areas and connecting corridors known as the Crystal City Underground

Crystal City has a station on the Washington Metro's Blue and Yellow Lines, and another on the Virginia Railway Express commuter train system.

Crystal City's layout was considered avant-garde at the time of construction in 1963 with superblocks bounded by arterial and circulating roads and pedestrian traffic and the businesses serving it relocated from the streets to pedestrian tunnels. Crystal City has since been redesigned to give it a more traditional, urban feel, with restaurants at street level, and with traffic patterns changed to make major streets like Crystal Drive function as city streets, rather than as circulating roads.

== History ==
=== 20th century ===
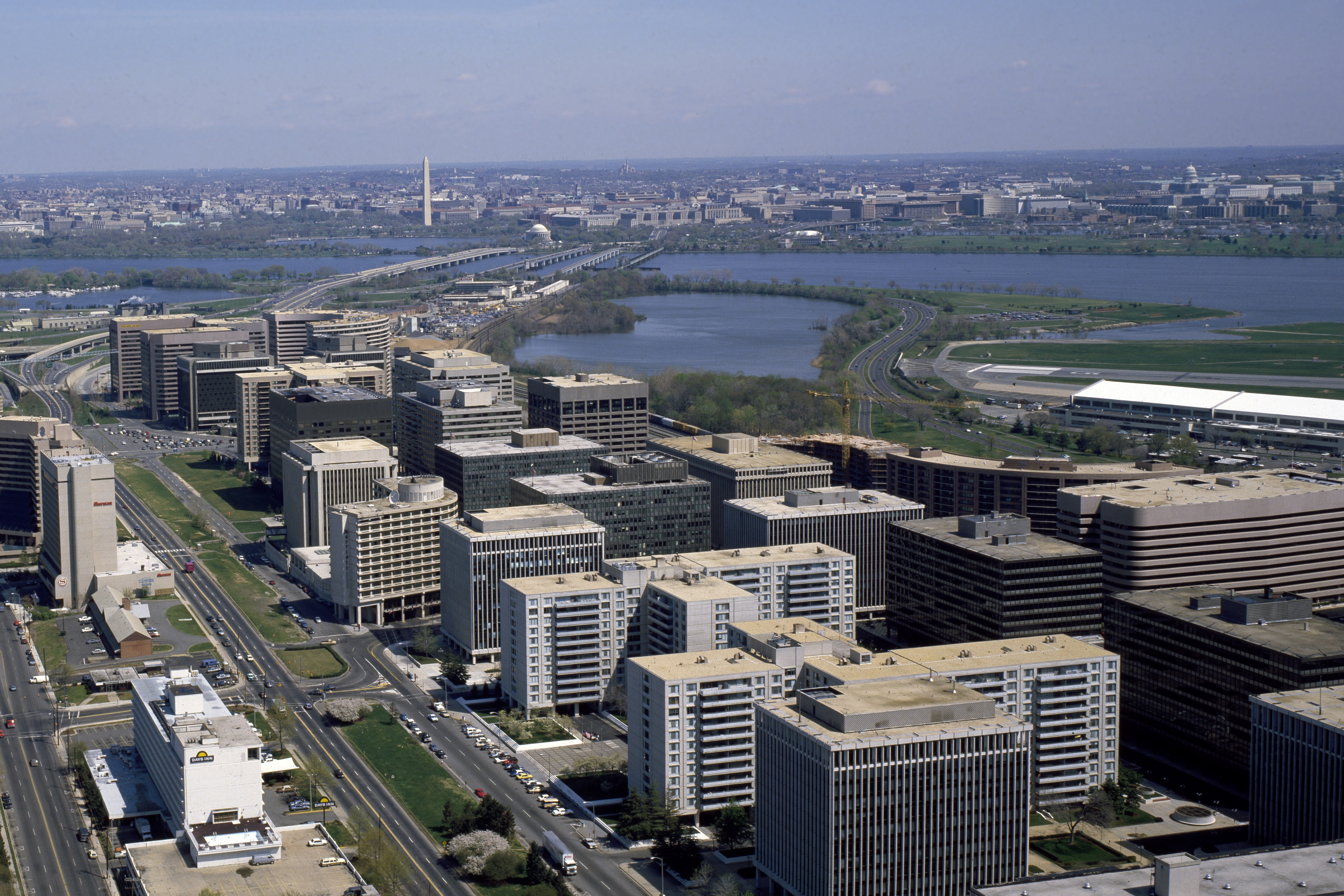
An aerial view of Crystal City with I-395 crossing the Potomac River and the Jefferson Memorial and Washington Monument in the background, 1980s

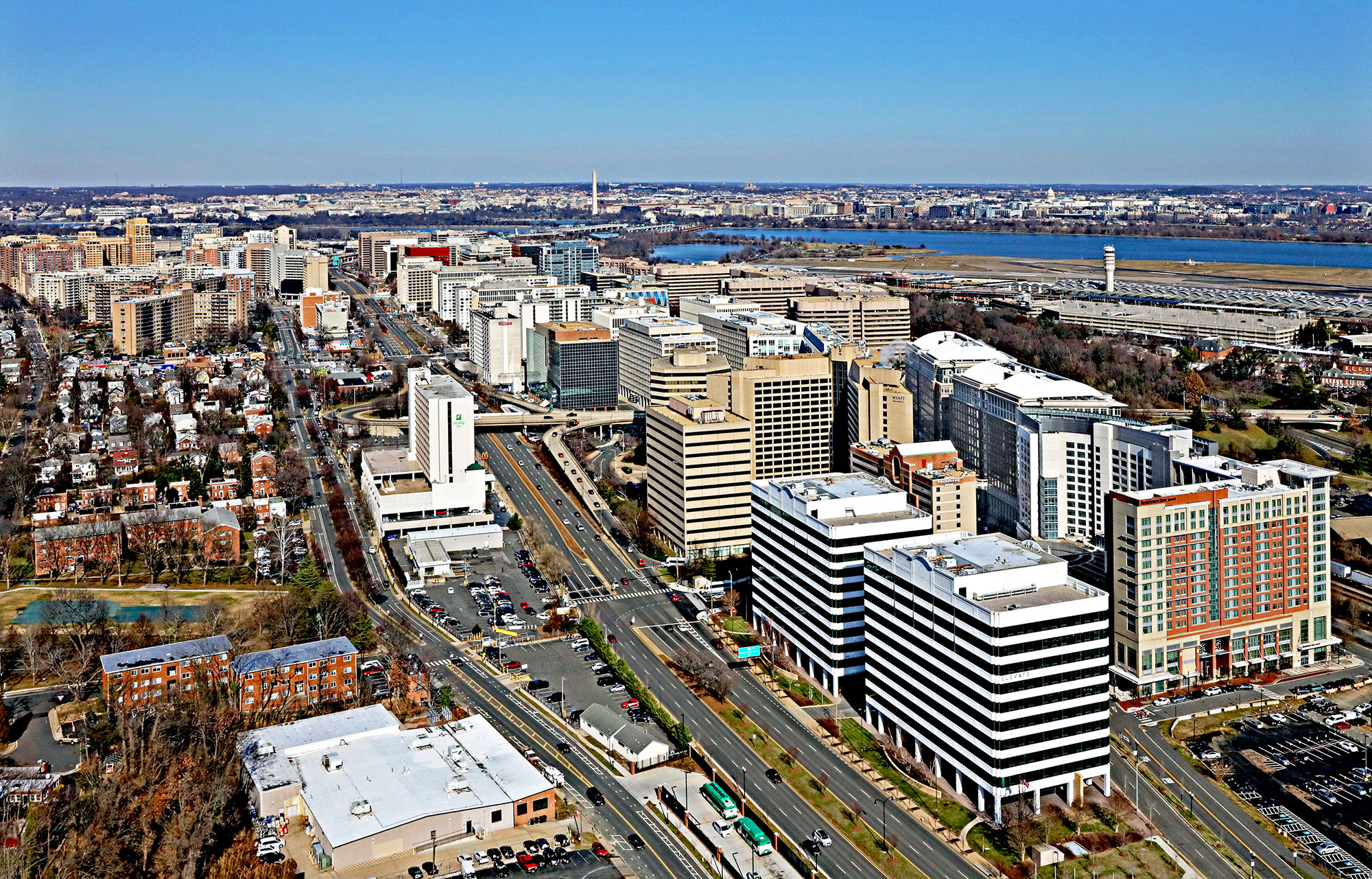
Crystal City looking north, January 2020

Before Crystal City's development by Charles E. Smith Co., the area was underutilized with light industrial activity and motels next to National Airport before the age of more consistent business travel. A drive-in theater existed at the intersection of Jefferson Davis Highway and 20th Street South between 1947 and 1963 is visible on aerial photos from this period. Tracks from the Richmond, Fredericksburg and Potomac Railroad were moved closer to National Airport to provide additional room for development.

Though it is not a planned community, Crystal City unfolded in much that fashion after construction began on the first few condominiums and office buildings in 1963. The name Crystal City came from the first building, which was called Crystal House and had an elaborate crystal chandelier in the lobby. Every subsequent building initially took on the Crystal name, including Crystal Gateway and Crystal Towers, and others. Crystal City is largely integrated in layout with extensive landscaping with most of its high-rise buildings featuring speckled granite exteriors.

Crystal City's Crystal Underground shopping mall opened in September 1976. Billed as a "turn-of-the-century shopping village," it featured antique leaded glass shop windows and cobblestone "streets". Emphasis was on locally owned and operated businesses and personalized service. The largest retail outlets were a 12,000-square-foot (1,100 m^{2}) Jelleff's women's store, Larimers gourmet grocery and delicatessen, and a Drug Fair. The mall also featured an Antique Alley with small antique and craft stores.

At its opening in 1976, there were 40 stores and anticipated expansion of 150,000 square feet (14,000 m^{2}) with 70 more shops, including the Crystal Palace food court. By 1990, there were over a hundred retailers in the Crystal City Underground.

=== 21st century ===
Beginning in June 2004, Crystal City underwent a number of changes. Many buildings' addresses were changed on this date, several major roads were turned into two-way streets, and many of the markings for the traditional building names, including Crystal Gateway 1, were removed.

In 2010, Arlington County developed the Crystal City Sector Plan, which presented the community's vision to transform Crystal City into a more inviting, lively, and walkable community with more ground-floor retail, better quality office space, and more housing options. This 40-year plan, which won the American Planning Association’s 2013 National Planning Achievement Award for Innovation in Economic Planning and Development, was credited with pioneering the use of economic analysis for planning purposes and closely studying the economic impact of demolishing and replacing major commercial buildings.

In 2024, the Crystal City Underground shopping mall closed its retail operations, although the pedestrian tunnels remain open.

== Economy ==
Crystal City currently has over 29,000 residents.

Crystal City is home to several Department of Defense offices. It has offices of the General Services Administration and satellite offices for the Pentagon, many of which were built or occupied during the Pentagon Renovation Program. Pentagon offices in Crystal City include the headquarters of the Warrior Transition Command and the Special Inspector General for Afghanistan Reconstruction.

US Airways once maintained its headquarters in the Crystal Park Four building in Crystal City. After US Airways merged with America West Airlines in 2005, the combined company closed the Virginia headquarters and moved the management to Tempe, Arizona, in Greater Phoenix.

Several companies, associations, and organizations are headquartered in Crystal City, including Boeing, Bloomberg Industry Group, the American Diabetes Association, PBS, the American Public Power Association, and the Consumer Technology Association, and others.

=== Amazon HQ2 ===
In November 2018, Amazon.com announced that Arlington would be the location of one of two campuses for its Amazon HQ2. In 2019, Amazon decided to focus on its Arlington location. In Amazon's announcement with Northern Virginia bidders, it announced that its HQ2 neighborhood location would be jointly marketed as "National Landing", which encompasses Crystal City and part of Pentagon City and Potomac Yard.

As of January 2026, Amazon employs approximately 8,500 workers in its HQ2 location.

== Gallery ==
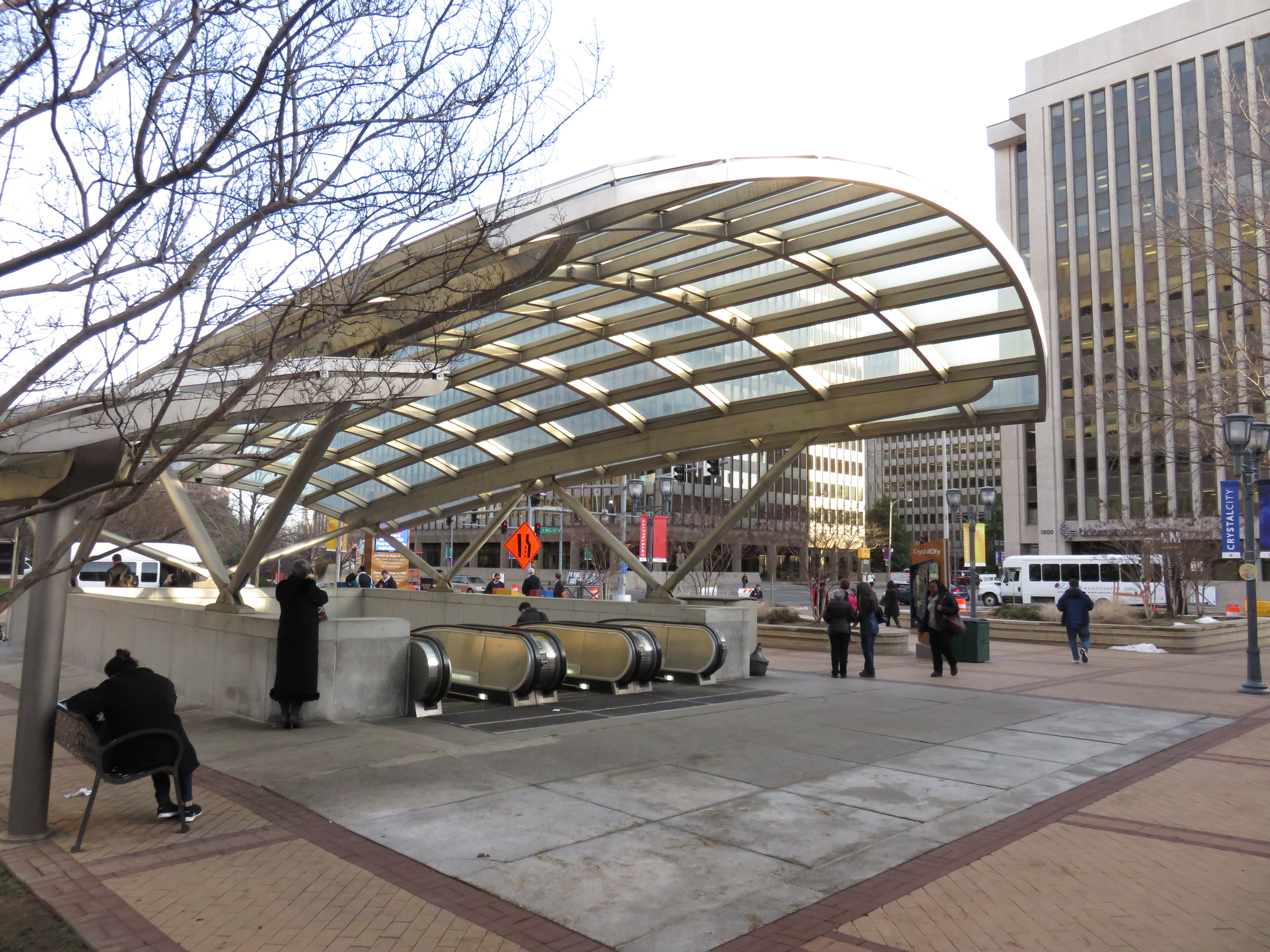
Crystal City metro station in 2016

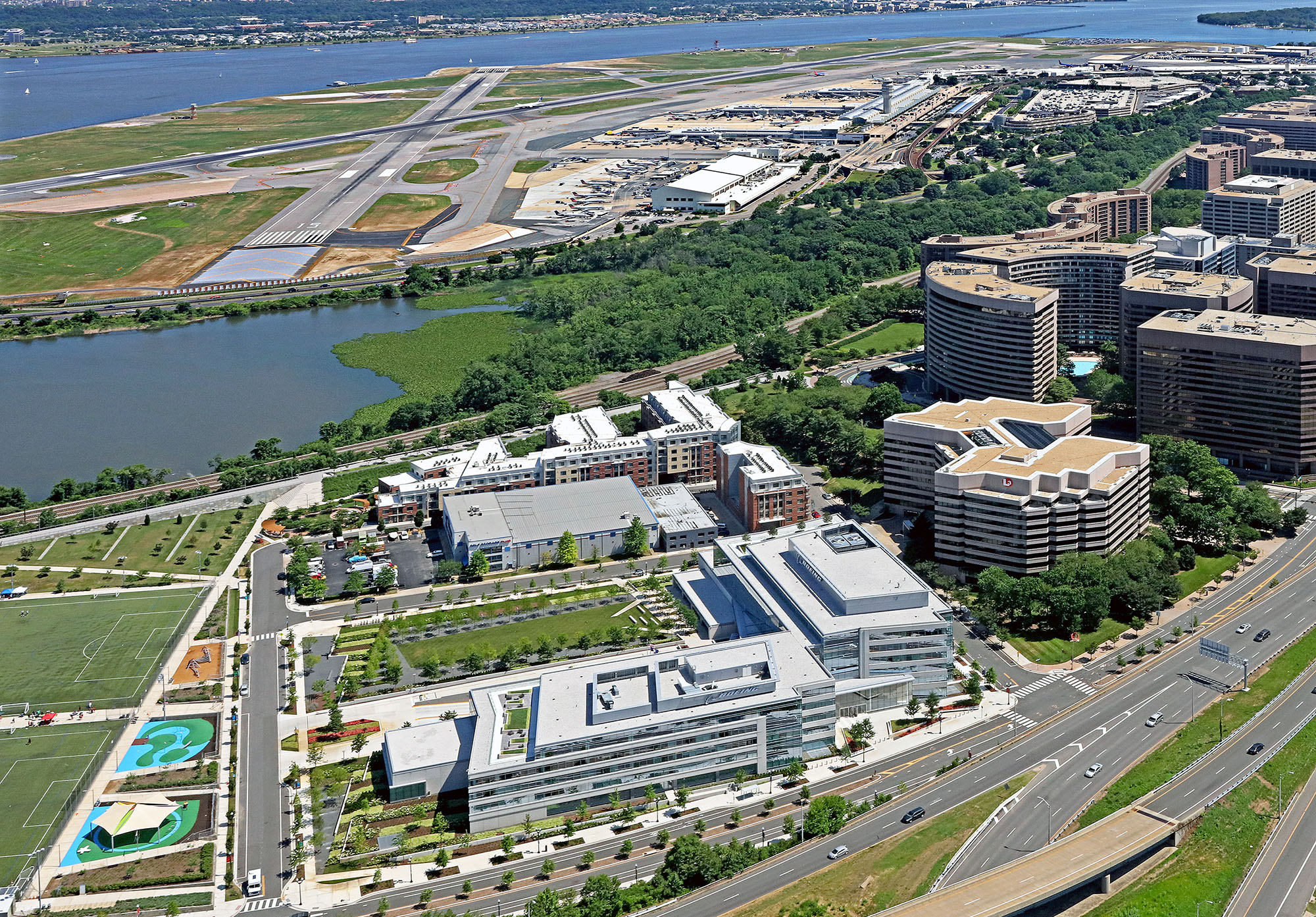
Boeing's global headquarters at Reagan National Airport

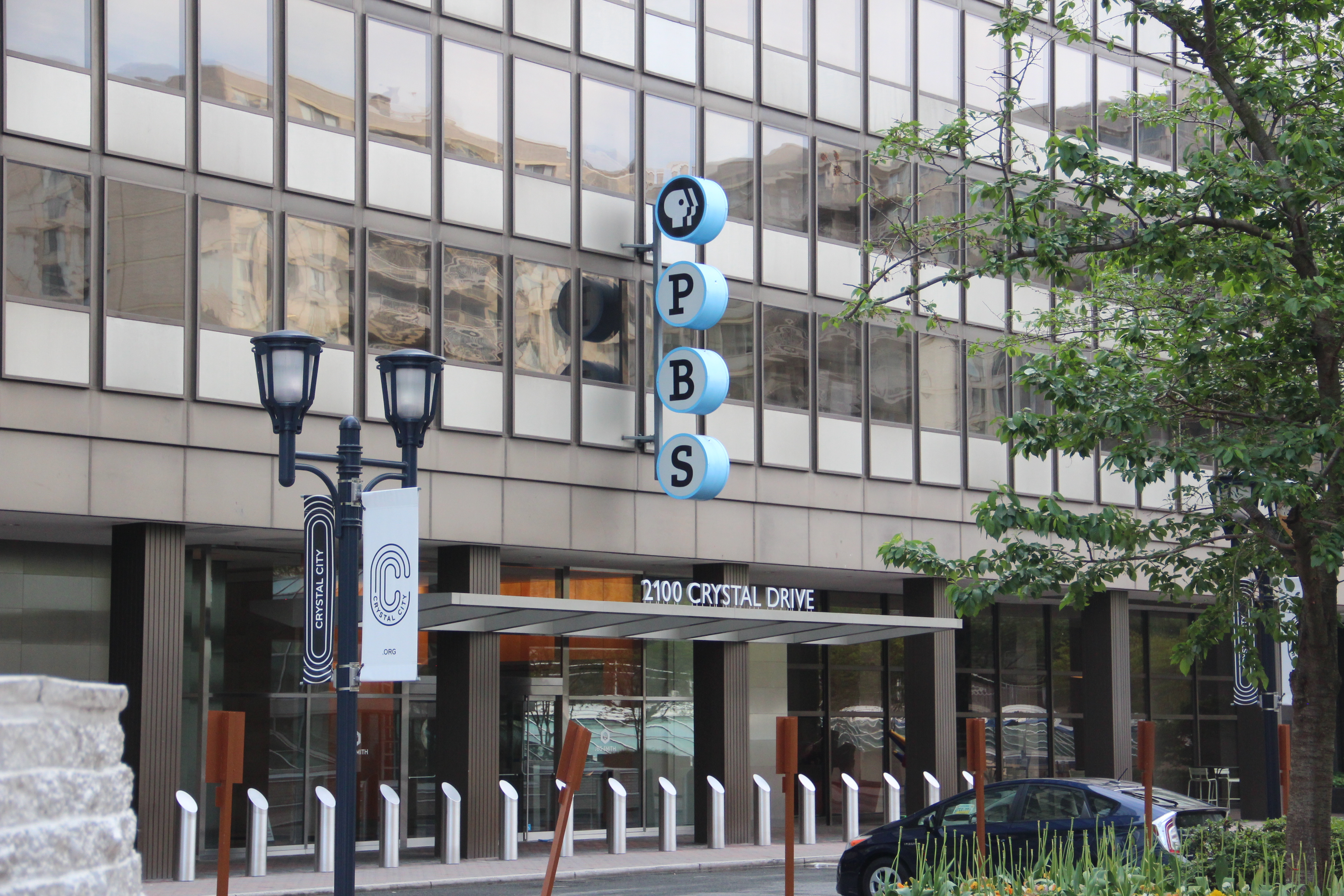
Former PBS headquarters in Crystal City, Virginia.

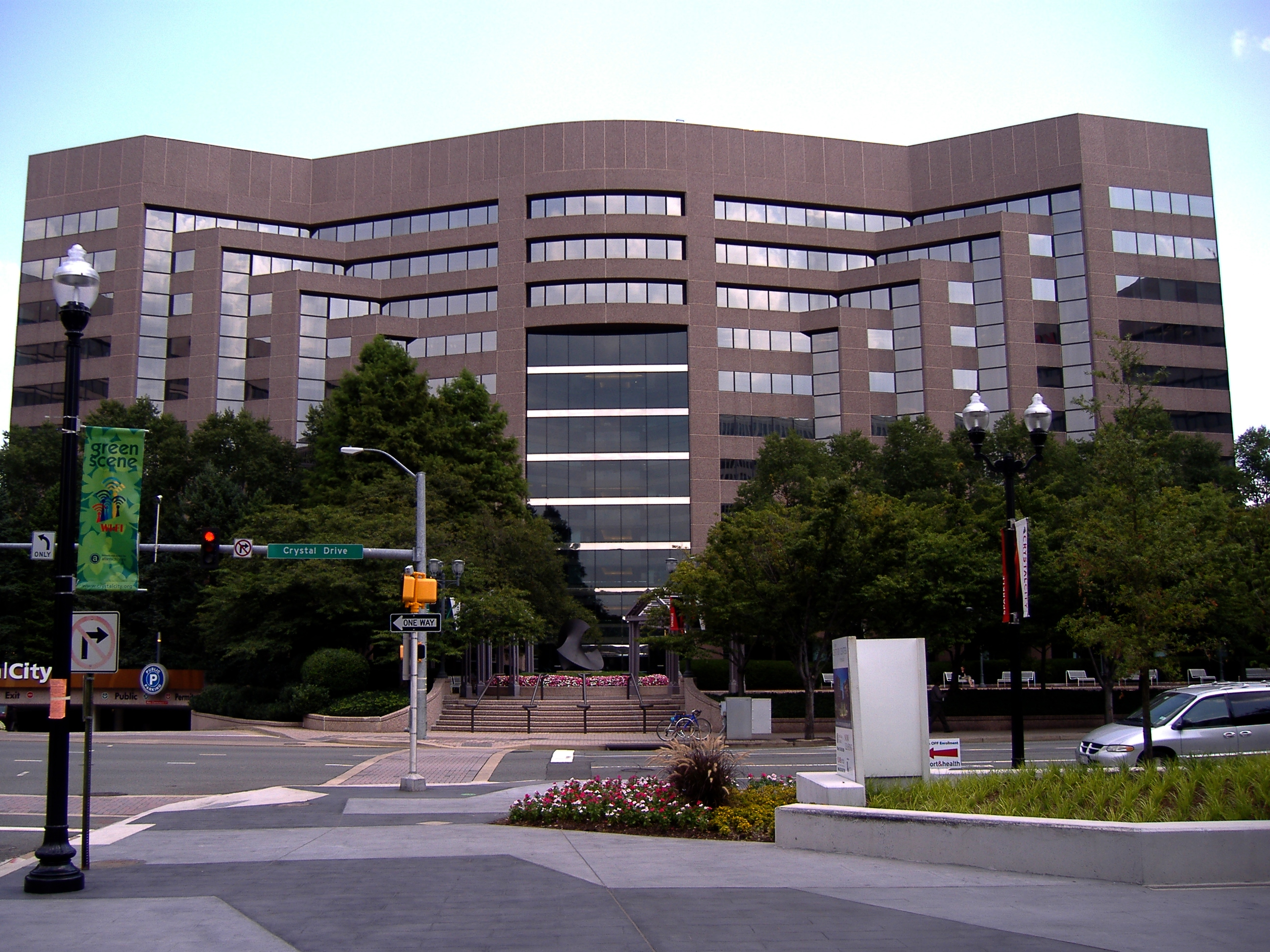
Crystal Park Four, a high-rise building that once served as the headquarters for US Airways
