= Bob Peck Chevrolet =

Architectural landmark in Arlington, now demolished

Coordinates: 38°52′48″N 77°06′55″W

Bob Peck Chevrolet was a car dealership, with a building that was a local landmark, located at 800 North Glebe Road, at the intersection of Glebe Road and Wilson Boulevard in the Ballston neighborhood of Arlington County, Virginia. The dealership opened the building in 1964, it closed in 2006, and was demolished in 2008.

The dealership showroom had a "distinctive, transparent circular showroom made of glass and chrome with a butterfly roof line that created a frieze of diamond-shaped, blue panels," according to the Historic American Buildings Survey. Designed by Northern Virginia architect Anthony Musolino, the dealership showroom has been identified as a visually compelling interpretation of Googie architecture.

After the dealership was demolished in 2008, it was replaced with an office building that incorporated aspects of the showroom's design in its façade. A historical marker was placed at the former structure's location.

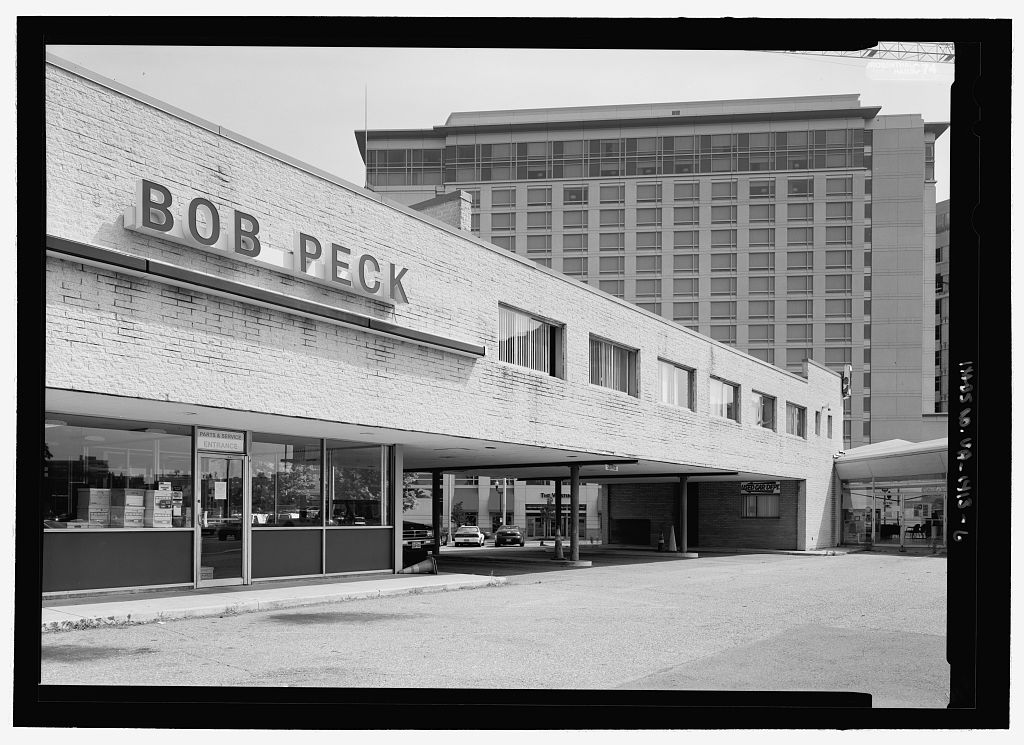
Bob Peck Chevrolet, 800 North Glebe Road, Arlington, VA.

== History ==
Bob Peck first opened a car dealership in the Clarendon neighborhood of Arlington in 1939. By the 1950s, he had rebranded his dealership as Bob Peck Chevrolet, and in 1964 relocated to the Ballston neighborhood, at the intersection of North Glebe Road and Wilson Boulevard.

While relocating the dealership, Peck hired architect Anthony "Tony" Musolino (1927-2009) to design a modern showroom. According to the Historic American Buildings Survey, the dealership's showroom "featured a distinctive, transparent circular showroom made of glass and chrome with a butterfly roof line that created a frieze of diamond-shaped, blue panels. Lettering within the panels spelled 'Chevrolet'."

At its peak, the dealership sold about 2,700 vehicles annually. Bob Peck, who served on Arlington's County Board and School Board, owned and operated the dealership until his death at age 84 in 1998.

In 2006, The Washington Post reported that the structure was pictured in U.S. News and World Report in the 1960s as an example of unusual architecture.

== Demolition and commemoration ==
In 2006 real estate developer JBG Companies purchased the dealership site for $26 million. Bob Peck's son, Don Peck, who was then operating the dealership, acknowledged that the offer was too lucrative to decline, and the dealership closed in May 2006.

Although JBG explored preserving the building, the original structure was demolished by 2008. A 2009 Washingtonian magazine article noted that there was local resistance to the building's demolition amid ongoing efforts by historic preservationists to preserve mid-century architecture. The office complex built on the site after the showroom's demolition includes a homage to the dealership's signature blue diamond roofline incorporated into the building's façade. In 2012, a historical marker was added at the location to commemorate the original dealership.

The original structure was frequently photographed and, according to Bob Peck, was featured in Soviet publications during the Cold War as a symbol of American capitalism.

The dealership's showroom was widely cited as an Arlington and Washington-area landmark and has been featured in two books on Arlington's history, written by a local historian . The showroom was also featured in the Genealogy of American Finance as part of the book's documentation of General Motors.

== Architectural significance ==
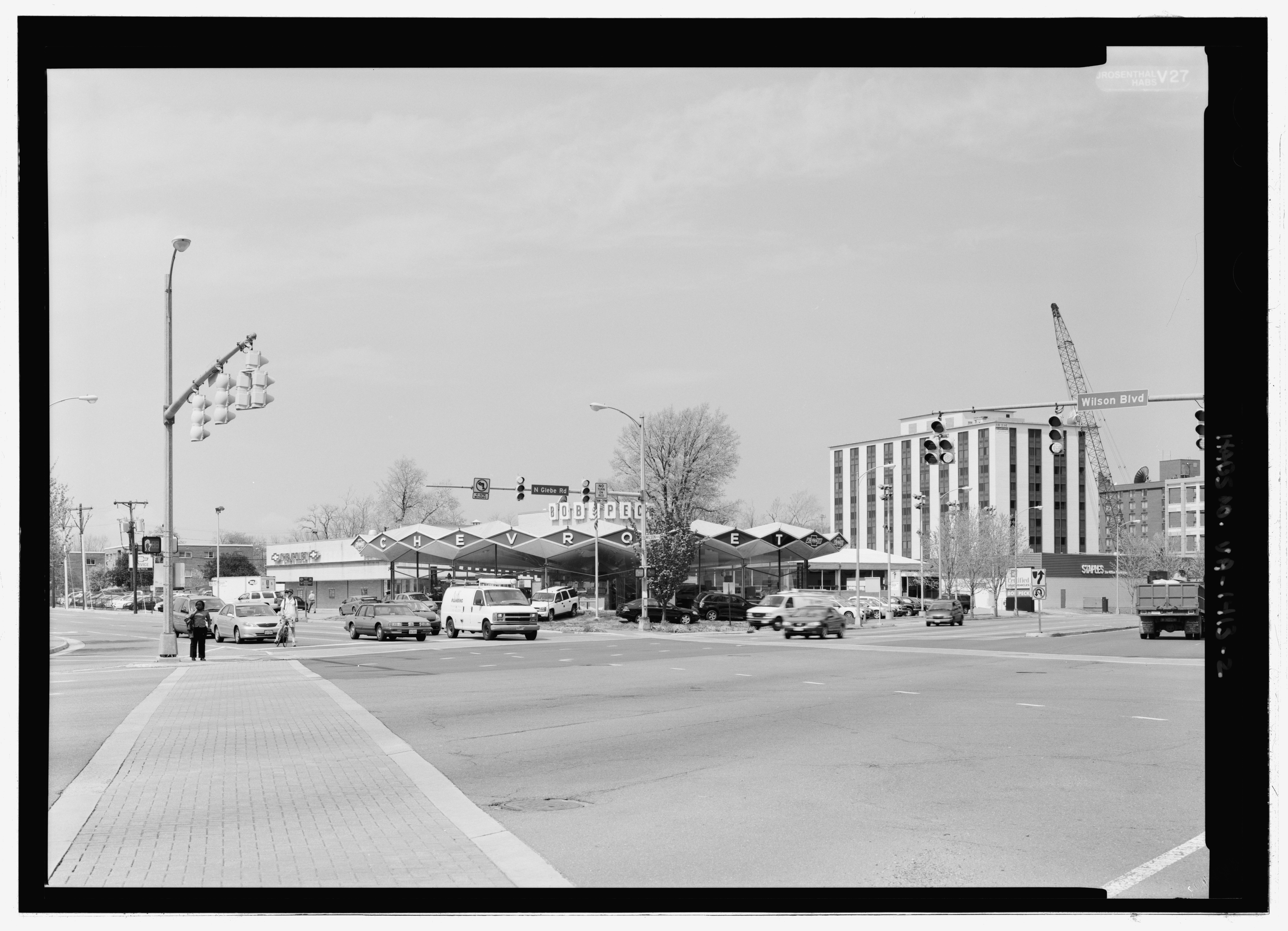
Perspective view of the showroom looking from the middle of the intersection of Glebe Road and Wilson Boulevard - Bob Peck Chevrolet, 800 North Glebe Road, Arlington, Arlington County, HABS VA-1413-2

The dealership showroom has been cited as an example of Googie architecture. In 2025, Deborah Oakley, an associate professor of architecture at the University of Nevada-Las Vegas published a paper that cited the building as an example of Googie architecture, particularly citing the building as a rare Googie building not located in California. Oakley noted that the showroom's "bold, futuristic design reflects key Googie elements, such as its exuberant signage, transparency, and dynamic roofline, meant to capture the attention of passing drivers and convey the optimism and progressiveness of the automotive industry at the time." As a landmark it was a visible manifestation of the American preoccupation with automobiles and futuristic design.

The structure is documented by the U.S. Government's Historic American Buildings Survey (HABS No. VA-1413), which cited the showroom as "an outstanding example of automotive-inspired commercial architecture" that "was part of a larger design oeuvre for the industry that peaked in the 1960s."

== See also ==
- Ballston, Arlington, Virginia
