= Bar Chinois =

Restaurant and wine bar in Washington, D.C., U.S.

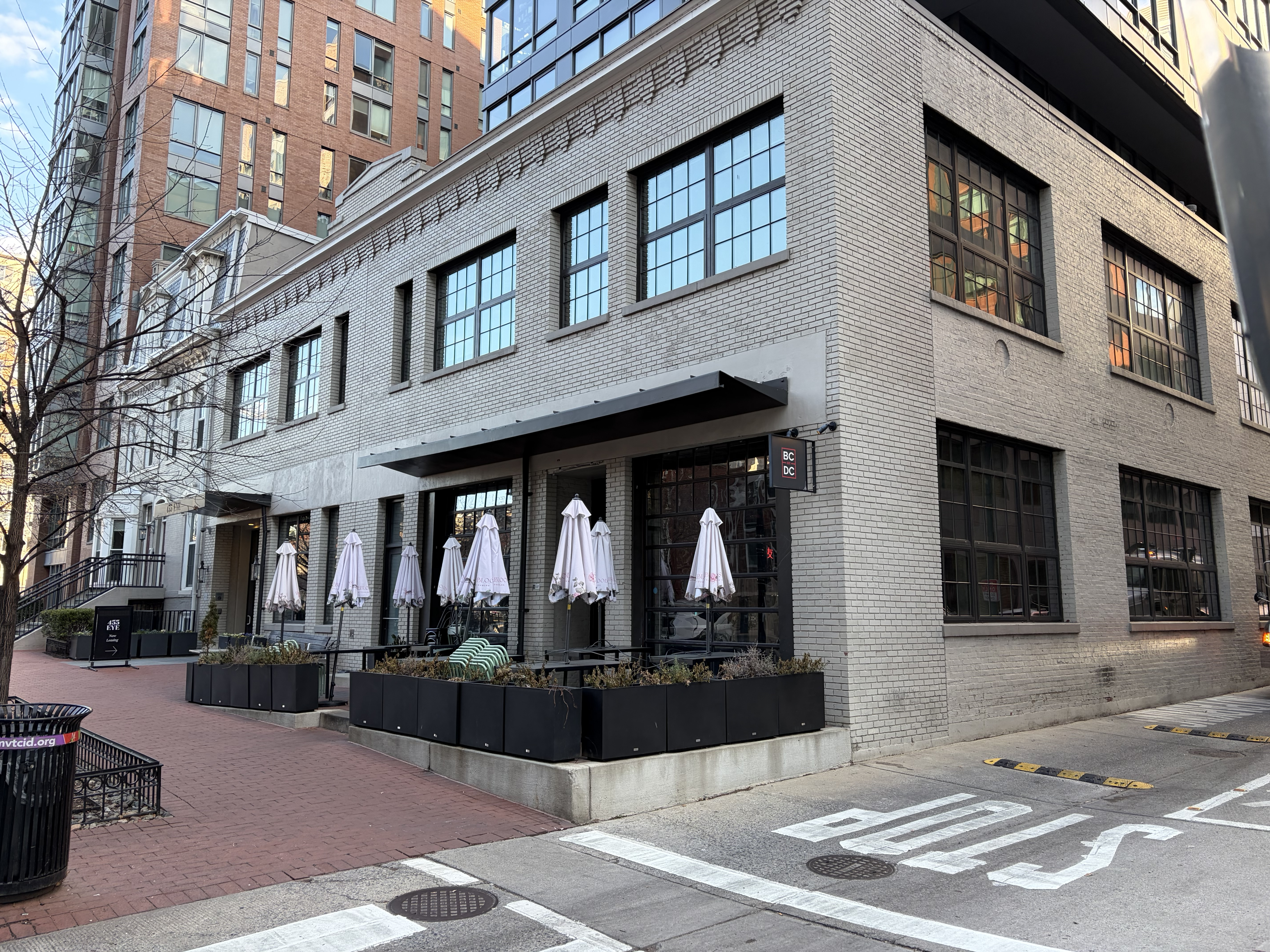
- Bar Chinois in 2026.
- Interactive map of Bar Chinois

Restaurant information
- Food type: Asian; Chinese fusion
- Location: 455 I Street NW, Washington, D.C., 20001, United States
- Coordinates: 38°54′5.9″N 77°1′4.6″W

Bar Chinois is an Asian restaurant and wine bar in with locations in Mount Vernon Triangle, Washington, D.C. and National Landing, Arlington, Virginia, United States.

== Description ==
The Infatuation has described the cuisine as Chinese fusion. The menu includes dim sum.
