= Link Logistics =

American logistics company

- Logo used in 2026
- Type: Private
- Industry: Logistics
- Founded: 2019; 7 years ago
- Headquarters: New York, United States
- Website: linklogistics.com

Link Logistics is an American logistics and real estate investment company headquartered in New York City. It manages approximately 460 million square feet of warehouse space across North America.

== History ==
Link Logistics was founded in early 2019 after Blackstone merged several of its subsidiaries. In June 2019, it acquired the United States portfolio of GLP for US$19 billion, which was one of the largest deals ever made between two private companies. The company became the largest logistics real estate operator in the United States, providing the "last-mile" solution in the logistics supply chain.

In 2023, Link Logistics added 59 industrial properties valued approximately US$2 billion into operation.

As of 2025, the company's properties included facilities in major metropolitan areas, including Southern California, South Florida, Dallas-Fort Worth, Chicago, New Jersey, and the San Francisco Bay Area.

In 2026, Link Logistics carried out two major transactions, selling 51 industrial properties and eight offices within the U.S. to BKM Capital Partners and Kayne Anderson Real Estate for $1.8 billion, and 38 industrial buildings to Stonemont and PCCP LLC for about $1 billion.

Due to rising demand in AI computing, 15% of its new facility leasing in 2026 was associated with development of data centers.
