= Amazon HQ2 =

Amazon.com's future second headquarters in North America

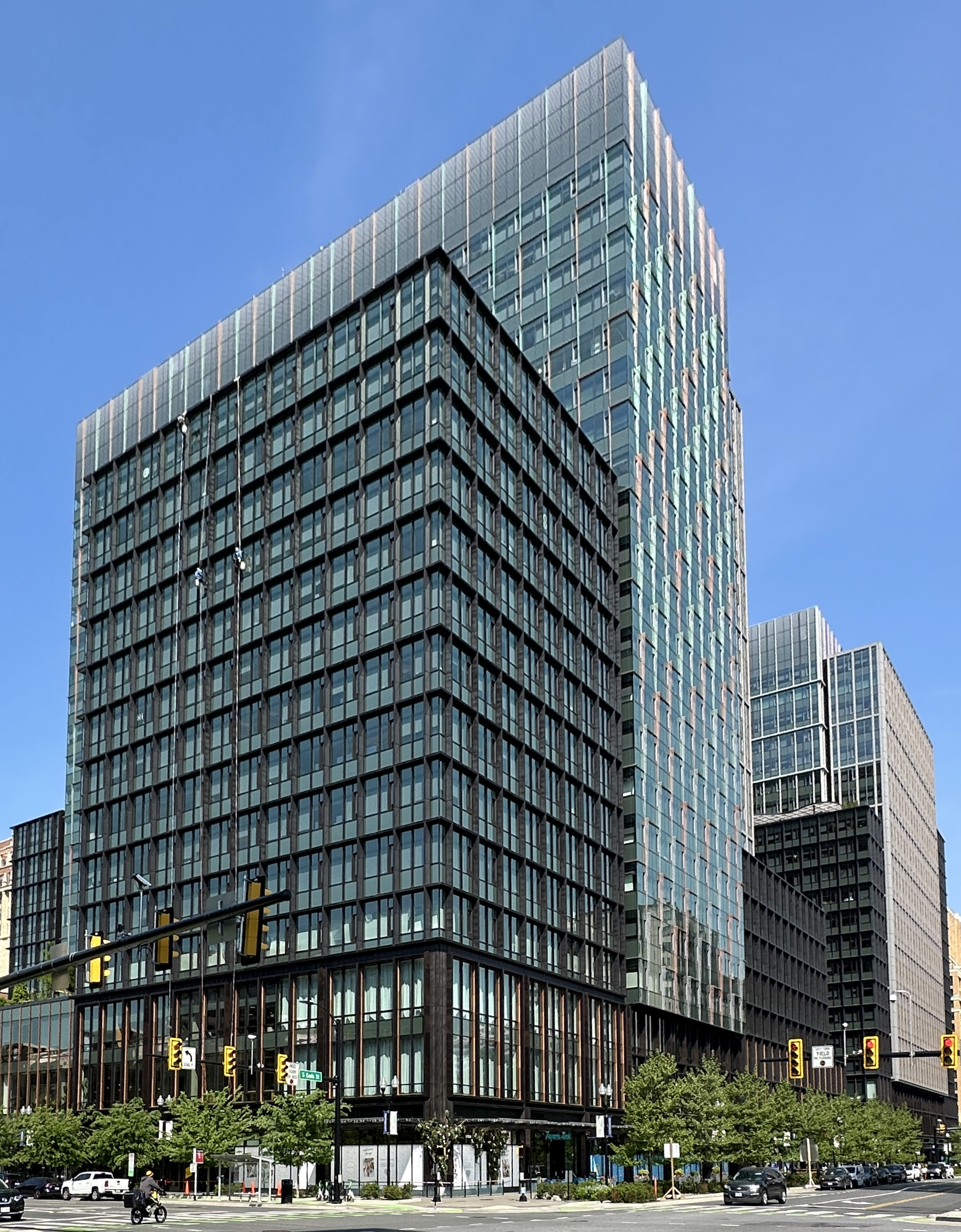
- Amazon HQ2's Merlin Building in the foreground and Jasper Building in the background

General information
- Location: Crystal City, Virginia, U.S.

Technical details
- Floor area: 6,000,000 sq ft (557,400 m^{2}) office (planned); 50,000 sq ft (4,600 m^{2}) retail (planned); 2,100,000 sq ft (195,100 m^{2}) under construction

Design and construction
- Architect: ZGF Architects
- Main contractor: Clark Construction

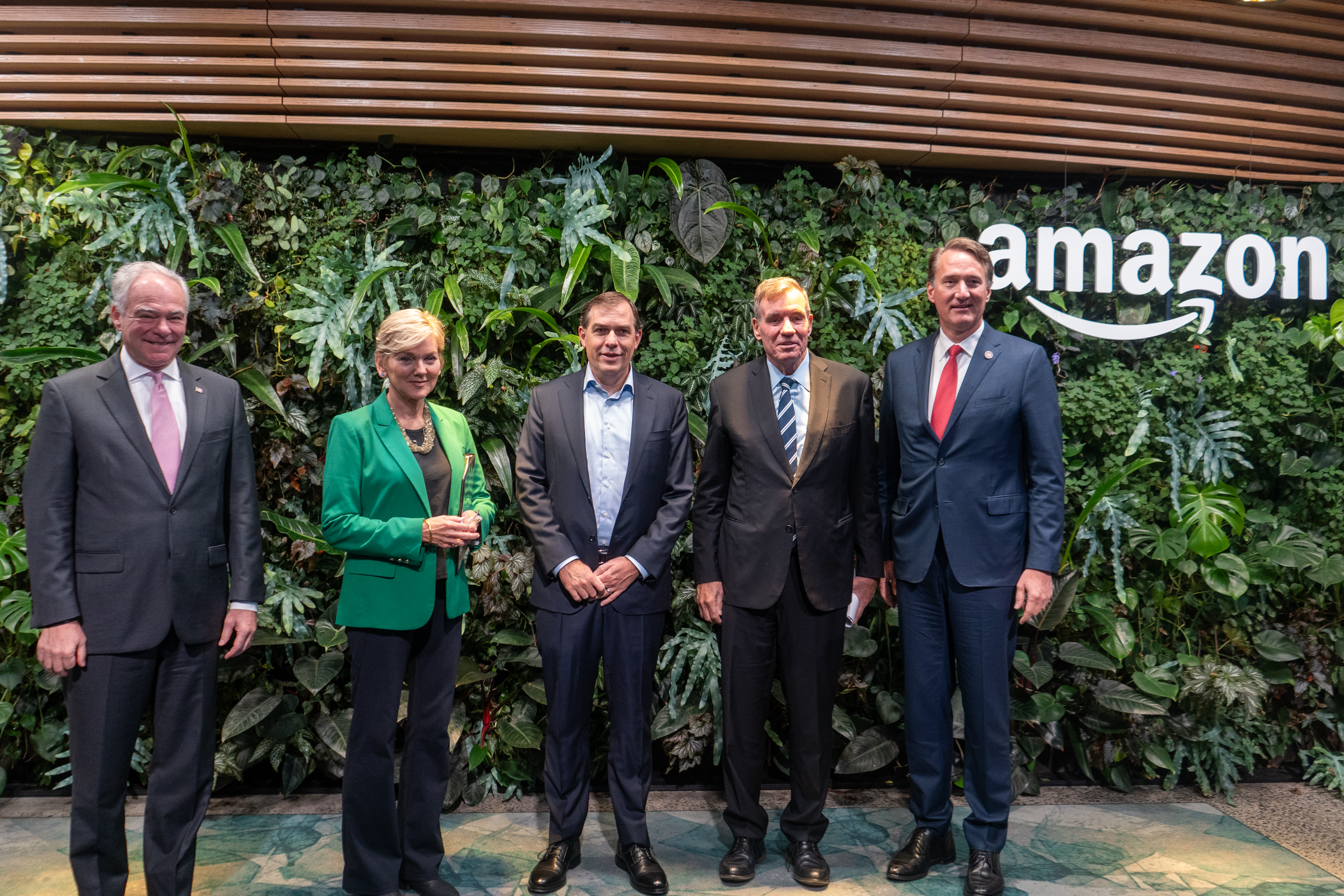
(left to right) Senator Tim Kaine, Energy Secretary Granholm, AWS CEO Matt Garman, Senator Warner, and Governor Youngkin at the HQ in October 2024

Amazon HQ2 is Amazon's corporate headquarters in National Landing (part of Arlington, Virginia) in the Washington metropolitan area, and an expansion of the company's headquarters in Seattle, Washington. Phase I, which currently houses 8,500 employees and has capacity for 14,000 employees, opened in June 2023. Construction on Phase II is paused indefinitely; the company has said that it currently has enough space for its needs.

HQ2 was announced in September 2017, when Amazon submitted request for proposals asking for tax breaks and other incentives to entice the company. At that time, Amazon claimed that it intended to spend $5 billion on construction and that HQ2 would house 50,000 workers when completed. More than 200 cities in Canada, Mexico, and the United States offered tax breaks, expedited construction approvals, promises of infrastructure improvements, new crime-reduction programs, and other incentives. In January 2018, a shortlist of 20 finalists was announced.

In November 2018, Amazon announced that HQ2 would be split into two locations, eventually reaching 25,000 workers at each: National Landing in Arlington County, Virginia, and Long Island City in Queens, New York City. In February 2019, Amazon cancelled the New York location after strong opposition from local grassroots organizers, residents and politicians, many of whom cited it as an example of corporate welfare. Virginia will provide Amazon with grants of $22,000 per worker with a salary of above $164,000 (as of 2026) that remains in place for 4-5 years as well as a percentage of hotel taxes received over a breakpoint. As of 2026, Amazon has only received $81,000 in taxpayer subsidies, all of which was related to excess hotel taxes generated.

== Background ==
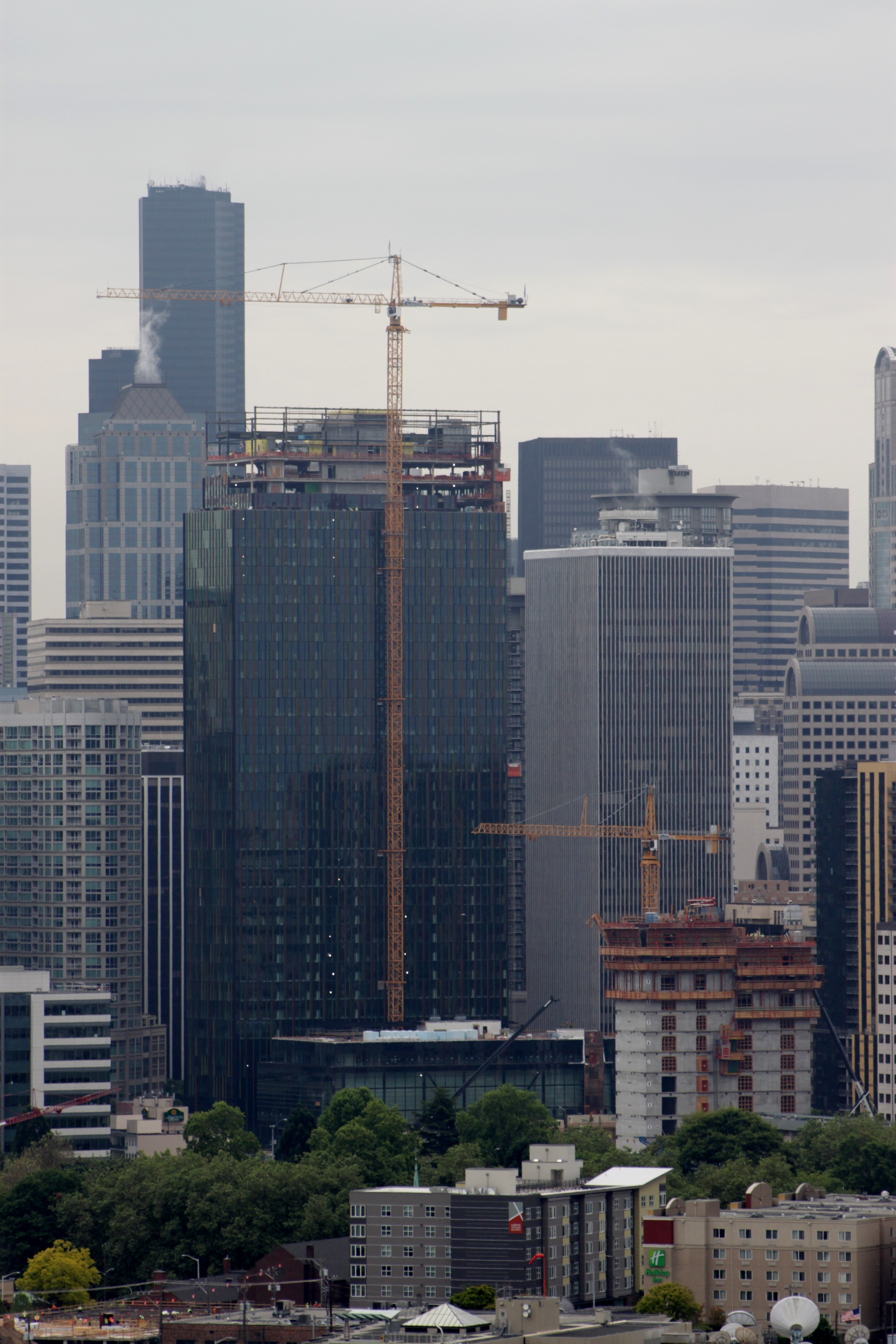
Part of the Amazon headquarters in Seattle, under construction in 2015

Amazon was founded in 1994 in Bellevue, Washington, and leased space in SoDo, Seattle. As the company grew, it moved offices around Downtown Seattle, until announcing a move to a purpose-built headquarters campus in South Lake Union, Seattle, which at that time was a light industrial enclave undergoing urban renewal. By October 2017, Amazon occupied 8.1 million square feet (750,000 m^{2}) of office space in 33 buildings in Seattle, employing 40,000 white collar workers.

The expansion of Amazon's headquarters outside of Seattle was characterized as a "wake-up call" to Seattle to improve the city's business climate by former Seattle Mayor Ed Murray and the Seattle Metropolitan Chamber of Commerce. Comparisons were made to Boeing's decision to move its corporate headquarters from Seattle to Chicago in 2001, which came as a surprise to Seattle.

=== Odds and predictions on which cities will win ===
Moody's Analytics determined that Austin, Texas, ranked highest among Amazon's criteria, followed by Atlanta, Philadelphia, and Rochester, New York.

In early 2018, New York University Stern School of Business professor Scott Galloway said Amazon was soliciting bids from places that it never intended to move to solely to gain tax breaks. He predicted that HQ2 would be located in either the New York metropolitan area or the Washington metropolitan area; with the decision to create two locations, Galloway ended up predicting both correctly. He repeatedly called the competition a "ruse" and a "con". Galloway said that "the game was over before it started", claiming that the proximity to both Jeff Bezos' home and the United States Capital made the DC area an obvious choice.

== Request for proposal ==
Amazon's request for proposal for HQ2 included preferences for:

- Metropolitan areas with a population of over 1 million
- Within 30 miles (48 km) of a population center
- Within 45 minutes of an international airport with direct flights to Seattle, New York City, San Francisco, and Washington, D.C.
- Proximity to major highways and arterial roads 1–3 miles (2–5 km)
- Access to mass transit routes
- Up to 8 million square feet (740,000 m^{2}) of office space for future expansion
- Proximity to major universities

Bids were required to be submitted by October 2017. A final site was planned to be selected and announced in November 2018, from a shortlist of 20 cities released in January 2018.

== Bids ==
=== Submitted ===
By the deadline, 238 proposals were submitted and received by Amazon, from 54 jurisdictions, including municipalities in all U.S. states except Arkansas, Hawaii, Iowa, Montana, North Dakota, South Dakota, Vermont, and Wyoming. The Canadian provinces of New Brunswick and Saskatchewan also had no regions submit a bid, along with the Yukon Territory.

In early and mid-October, Little Rock, Arkansas, and San Antonio, Texas withdrew their bid submissions.

=== Promotional bids ===
Several cities and groups promoted their HQ2 bids by engaging in promotional campaigns and gimmicks, including offers and gifts to Amazon. Sun Corridor, a Tucson, Arizona economic development firm, sent a 21-foot saguaro cactus to Amazon in an attempt to promote the city's bid. The gift was rejected due to the company's corporate gifts policy, instead donating it to the Arizona-Sonora Desert Museum. The city of Stonecrest, Georgia, a suburb of Atlanta, voted to de-annex 345 acres (140 ha) of land for Amazon to establish its own city named Amazon around its headquarters.

Sly James, mayor of Kansas City, Missouri, purchased 1,000 products from Amazon, which he donated to charity. James wrote five-star reviews for each one of them, in which every review mentioned positive attributes of Kansas City. Primanti Brothers, a chain of sandwich shops based in Pittsburgh, offered free sandwiches to Amazon employees if they chose the city as their second headquarters.

The city of Birmingham, Alabama erected several giant Amazon boxes and dash buttons around public areas. The dash buttons sent out pre-generated tweets to lure Amazon to the city. New York City mayor Bill de Blasio announced that major landmarks in the city would be lit in orange to promote the city's campaign for HQ2.

A group from Calgary sprayed messages onto sidewalks in Seattle's South Lake Union neighborhood urging the company to choose the city. During an Ottawa Senators hockey game, fans were encouraged to "make noise" for the city of Ottawa's Amazon bid.

The neighboring American and Canadian cities of Detroit, Michigan and Windsor, Ontario submitted a bid together and campaigned the two cities to be the home of the new Amazon campus. With the headquarters being divided across the Canada–United States border, the company could take advantage of tax incentives offered by both Ontario and Michigan. Amazon would also be able to capitalize on the less restrictive Canadian immigration laws and the lower currency exchange of the Canadian dollar.

=== Criticism and opposition ===
In early 2018, New York University Stern School of Business professor Scott Galloway said Amazon was soliciting bids from places that it never intended to move to solely to gain tax breaks. He predicted that HQ2 would be located in either the New York metropolitan area or the Washington metropolitan area; with the decision to create two locations, Galloway ended up predicting both correctly. He repeatedly called the competition a "ruse" and a "con". Galloway said that "the game was over before it started", claiming that the proximity to both Jeff Bezos' home and the United States Capital made the DC area an obvious choice.

In an editorial in USA Today, Steven Strauss, a lecturer and visiting professor at Princeton University, suggested that metropolitan areas should be cautious about bidding too generously to win the Amazon bid since companies have failed to follow up on expansion plans. Strauss wrote that it was possible that cities could over-pay (the so-called "winner's curse") by providing an overly generous incentive package, which would turn out to be a money-losing proposition for the municipality if all the promised jobs did not materialize.

Conservative and liberal advocacy groups voiced their opposition to various tax breaks promised by cities in hopes of luring Amazon citing the offers as corporate welfare.

Jim Balsillie remarked that he was disappointed in W. Edmund Clark, who was in charge of the Toronto bid, when Clark highlighted the lower salaries of tech workers in Canada compared to the U.S. Balsillie found this strategy to be "misguided... these strategies put our tech workers in a global race to the bottom, competing on cost with the salaries in Poland, Ukraine, and India."

There were concerns that HQ2 would drop a "prosperity bomb" on the winning communities that would lead to soaring rents and property taxes.

=== Finalists ===
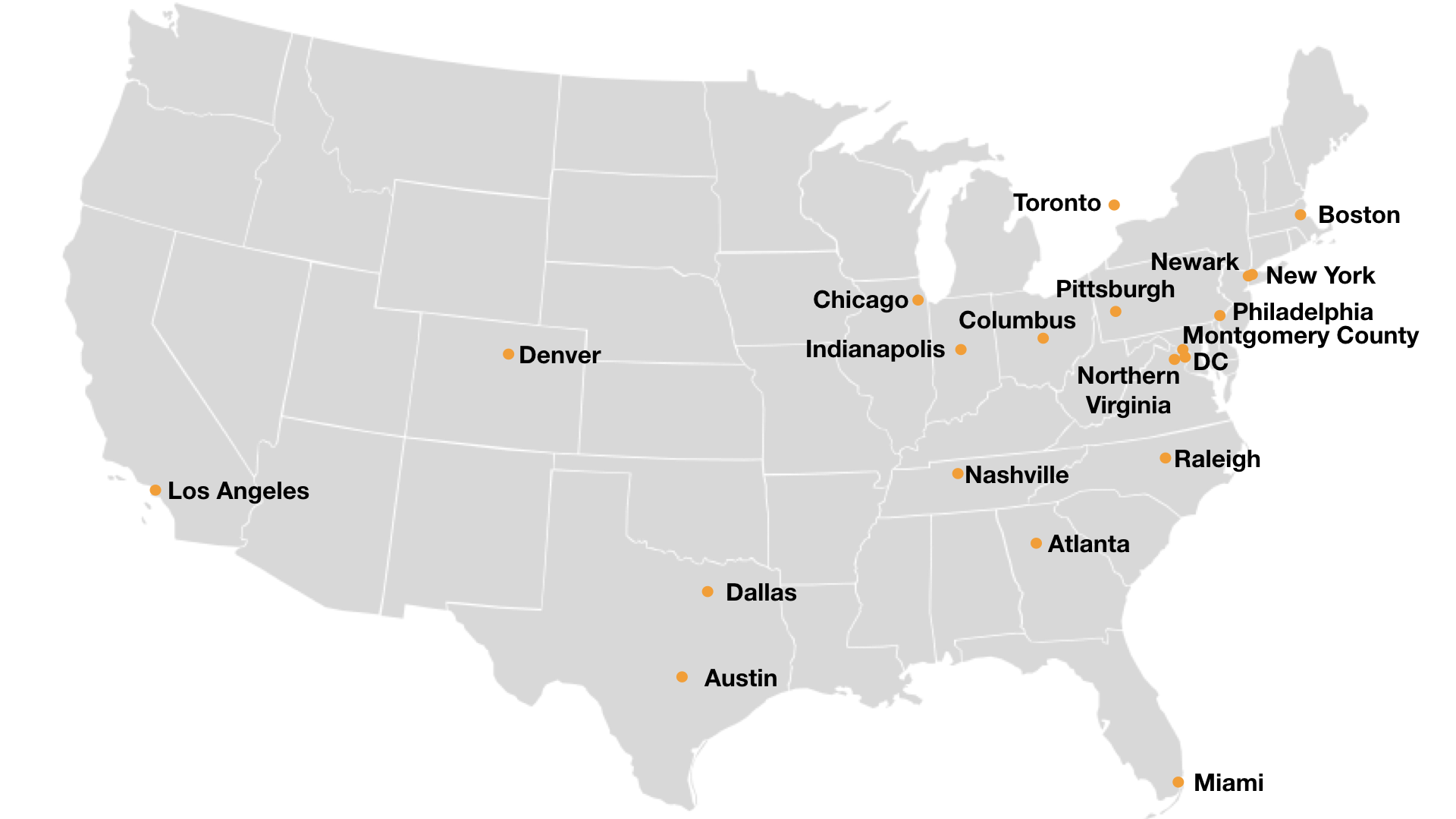
Amazon HQ2 final 20 cities

In January 2018, Amazon announced its shortlist of 20 finalists for HQ2. Finalists were primarily on the East Coast and in the Midwest, with Los Angeles the only selection from the West Coast and Toronto the only city outside of the United States.

- Atlanta, Georgia (including Stonecrest)
- Austin, Texas
- Boston, Massachusetts (Suffolk Downs-East Boston and Somerville)
- Chicago, Illinois (City Center Campus, Downtown Gateway District, River District, Lincoln Yards, The 78, Burnham Lakefront, Fulton Market District, Illinois Medical District, Schaumburg, Oak Brook)
- Columbus, Ohio (Franklinton, Ohio State University, Easton)
- Dallas, Texas
- Denver, Colorado
- Indianapolis, Indiana
- Los Angeles, California
- Miami, Florida
- Montgomery County, Maryland
- Nashville, Tennessee
- Newark, New Jersey
- New York City, New York (West Midtown Manhattan, Financial District, Brooklyn Tech Triangle, Long Island City)
- Northern Virginia (Fairfax and Loudoun counties, including Arlington and Alexandria, in Virginia)
- Philadelphia, Pennsylvania (Schuylkill Yards, uCity Square, Navy Yard)
- Pittsburgh, Pennsylvania
- Raleigh, North Carolina
- Toronto, Ontario (including Mississauga, Brampton, York Region, Durham Region, Halton Region, Waterloo Region, Guelph and Hamilton)
- Washington, D.C. (Anacostia Riverfront, Capitol Hill East, NoMa-Union Station, Shaw-Howard University)

Some of the finalists used their Amazon proposals to attract investments from other multinational corporations.

Amazon representatives began tours of its finalist cities in late February. Bidding cities also signed non-disclosure agreements with Amazon for the duration of the bid process. although the NDA did not prevent disclosure of financial incentives that cities have offered. By May 2018, Amazon representatives had visited the 20 finalist cities.

In early November 2018, the likelihood of Crystal City being chosen as the winning bid was leaked to the press, which Amazon states was in violation of the non-disclosure agreement; the travel patterns of Jeff Bezos also led to speculation that Crystal City would be chosen.

== Winning bids ==
The selections of New York City and Northern Virginia for the HQ2 sites were confirmed on November 13, 2018. As part of the announcement, "National Landing" was chosen as the new name for the neighborhood of HQ2 in Northern Virginia; it encompasses Crystal City, Pentagon City, and Potomac Yard. Amazon also announced that it would employ 5,000 people at a new Operations Center of Excellence in Nashville, Tennessee.

=== Long Island City ===
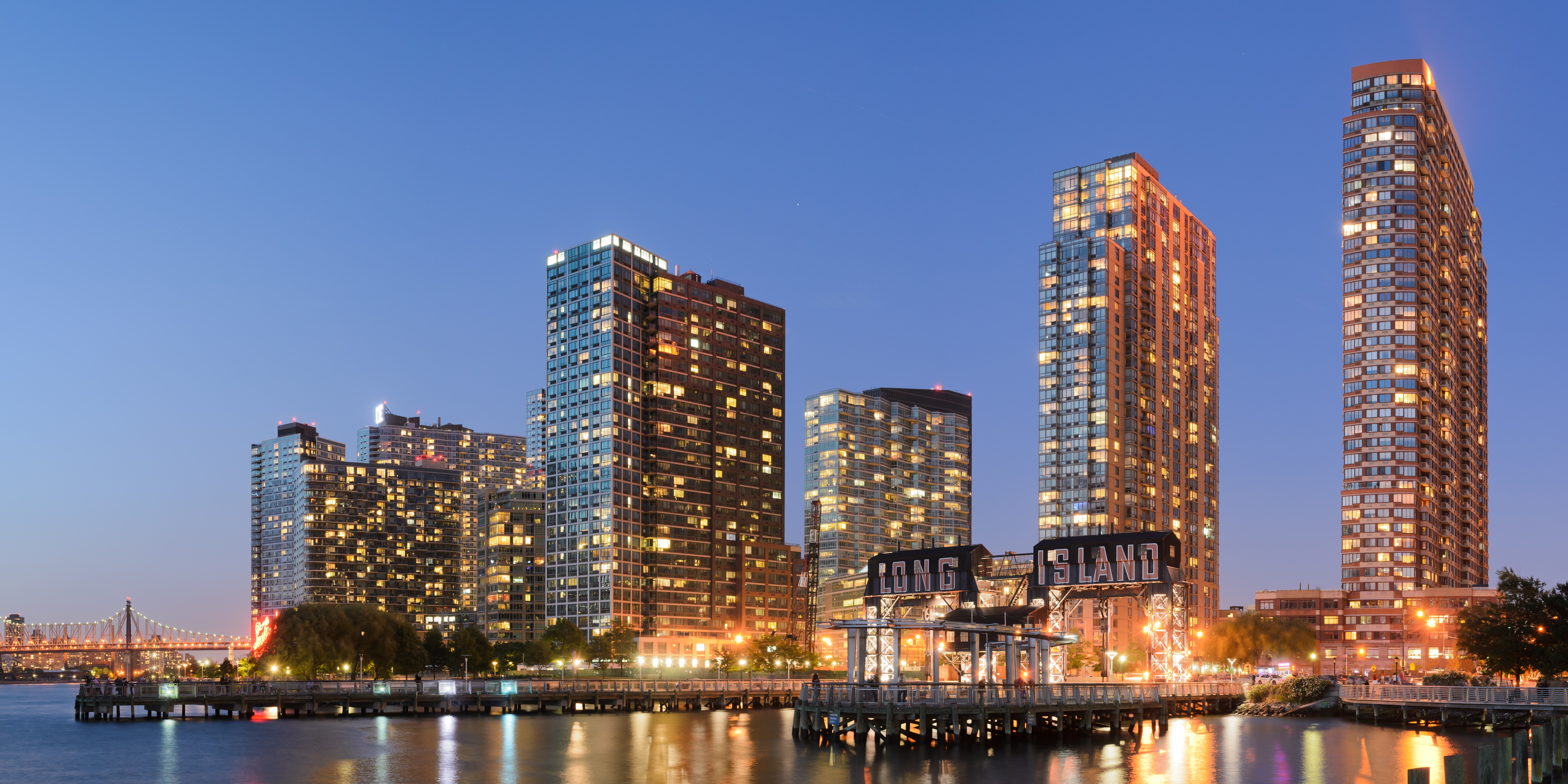
Long Island City, Queens, New York City, canceled second location of Amazon HQ2

The subsidies offered to Amazon in New York included performance-based direct incentives of $1.525 billion based on whether the company created 25,000 jobs. This included a refundable tax credit through the state's Excelsior Program of up to $1.2 billion, calculated as a percentage of the salaries Amazon expects to pay employees over the following 10 years. The Empire State Development Corporation also offered Amazon a cash grant of $325 million based on the occupancy rates of HQ2 buildings over in the following 10 years. Half of the property taxes for the city's HQ2 campus would be waived, and the tax payments would go to the city's PILOT (payment in lieu of taxes) fund to pay for infrastructure improvements in New York City. Both states proposed that Amazon be given access to a helipad, and the New York state government also promised to upgrade nearby infrastructure. Officials estimated that Amazon's move would generate $27 billion in taxes for the city and state.

Amazon was said to have chosen New York City as one of the sites for HQ2 because of the city's highly skilled pool of talent; existing tech, finance, and media industries; and strong university system, including Columbia University and Cornell Tech.

==== Cancellation of New York portion ====
After the HQ2 campus in New York City was announced, officials representing parts of Queens, such as U.S. Representative-elect Alexandria Ocasio-Cortez, Councilman Jimmy Van Bramer, State Senator Michael Gianaris, and Assemblyman Ron Kim, announced their disapproval. Ocasio-Cortez, Van Bramer, and Gianaris all expressed concern that Amazon would receive tax breaks while critical infrastructure, such as the New York City Subway, was deteriorating, and the New York City public school system and New York City Health Department were underfunded. Ocasio-Cortez raised concerns about the affordability of housing in Queens, since housing prices around the HQ2 campus in Queens began rising in anticipation of the campus's construction. Kim and Fordham University professor Zephyr Teachout wrote an opinion piece in The New York Times in which they stated that the city should "not offer incentives and giveaways to an internet giant known for squashing small businesses."

The Long Island City location would be built on land previously planned for 6,000 homes, including 1,500 affordable housing units. It was criticized by New York State Senate member Michael Gianaris. However, polls showed that the majority of New York City residents approved of the deal with Amazon.

In February 2019, Amazon canceled the planned Long Island City location due to opposition; however, it continued with the Crystal City and Nashville locations. Bill de Blasio and Cuomo were "blindsided" by Amazon's decision when informed by Amazon VP Jay Carney. New York governor Andrew Cuomo blamed the New York State Democratic Committee of the New York State Senate for the cancellation. Ocasio-Cortez stated that the funds offered to Amazon would be better used to hire more teachers, fix subways, and put a lot of people to work. Activist organizations such as Open New York also argued that, in Amazon's absence, the original plans to build 6,000 homes should be re-adopted.

In the weeks following Amazon's decision, Governor Cuomo phoned multiple Amazon executives and even Jeff Bezos, personally asking them to reconsider and guaranteeing them "support". The Partnership for New York City placed an open letter in The New York Times stating that Cuomo "will take personal responsibility for the project's state approval" with the letter signed by Hakeem Jeffries, Carolyn Maloney, Andrew D. Hamilton, David M. Solomon, David N. Dinkins, and Ajay Banga, among others.

Amazon denied that politics rather than logistics were a factor in Amazon choosing to cancel its New York location.

Despite cancelling the Long Island City location, in December 2019, Amazon signed a new lease for 335,000 square feet (31,100 m^{2}) of space in the Hudson Yards neighborhood to accommodate 1,500 employees. The company already had 3,500 tech employees in the New York City area.

In February 2019, Cuomo called the cancellation the "greatest tragedy" he had seen during his tenure as governor of New York.

=== Northern Virginia ===
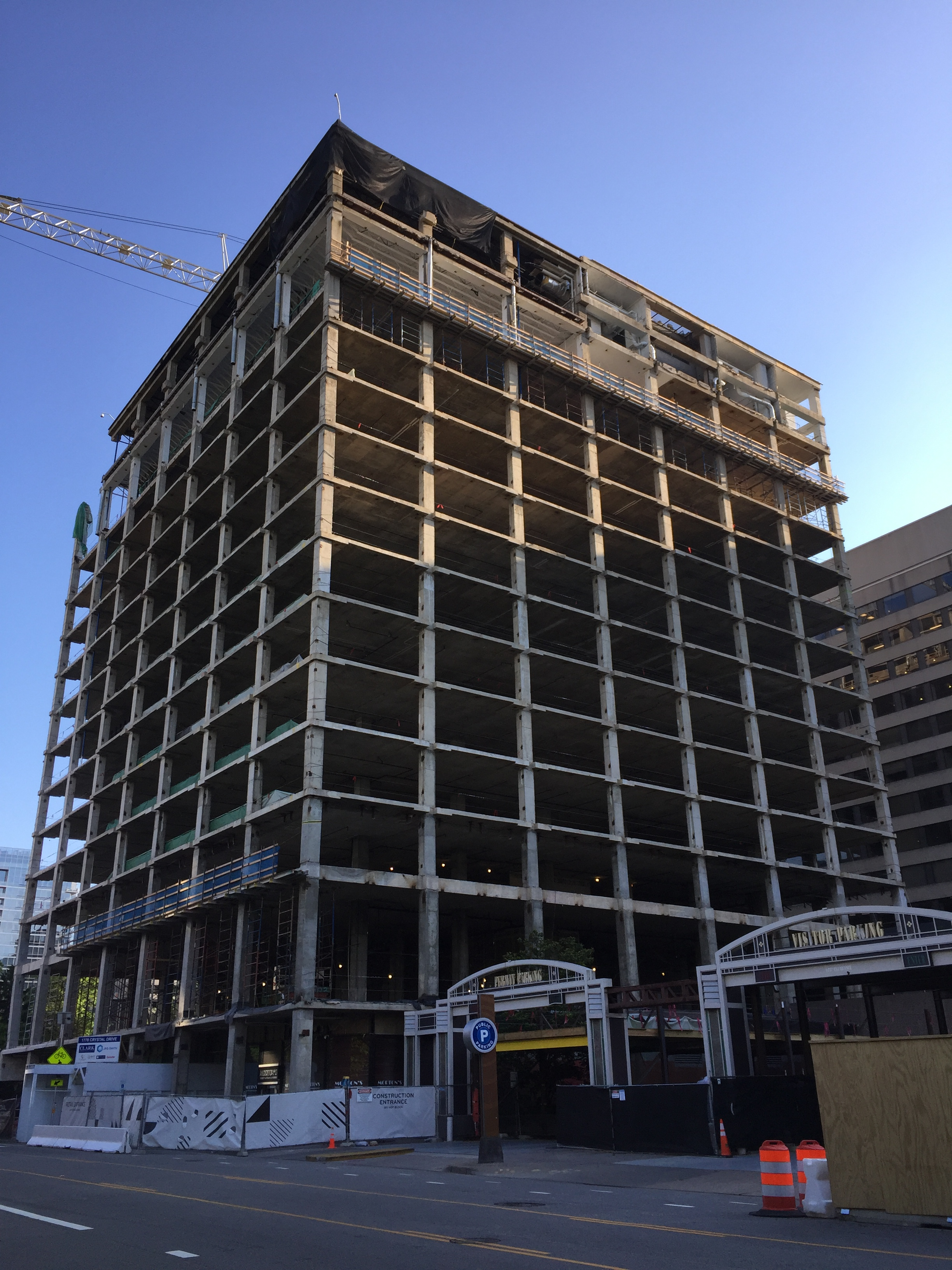
1770 Crystal Drive being renovated

For the location of HQ2, Amazon selected an area in Northern Virginia encompassing parts of the Crystal City and Pentagon City neighborhoods of Arlington County and the Potomac Yard neighborhood in the city of Alexandria which was branded as "National Landing". While redevelopment efforts in the area had begun as early as 2014, the cross-jurisdictional neighborhood was branded and announced as "National Landing" in 2018 as a part of local economic development plans to bring Amazon HQ2 to the area. The announcement also included plans to build a graduate school satellite university campus of Virginia Tech in the area. The "National Landing" name derives, in part, from the area's proximity to Ronald Reagan Washington National Airport.

Virginia offered performance-based incentives which included a workforce cash grant of $22,000 each for the first 25,000 jobs Amazon created that paid an average annual salary of $150,000, with increases for inflation, by 2030 as well as an additional $15,000 each for the next 12,850 qualifying jobs created by 2034. Arlington County offered an additional $23 million in cash grants, to be disbursed over 15 years, contingent on Amazon reaching a certain office size and the gradual increased revenue from a tax collected from the county's hotel rooms. The county also offered an estimated $28 million in infrastructure improvements tied to the property taxes of the Pentagon City and Crystal City area.

Amazon's officials initially said it could occupy up to 8 million square feet of office space in Arlington over the course of 15 years. However, company officials said in May 2019 that Amazon would not promise anything over 4 million square feet.

== Development ==
=== Phase 1: Metropolitan Park ===
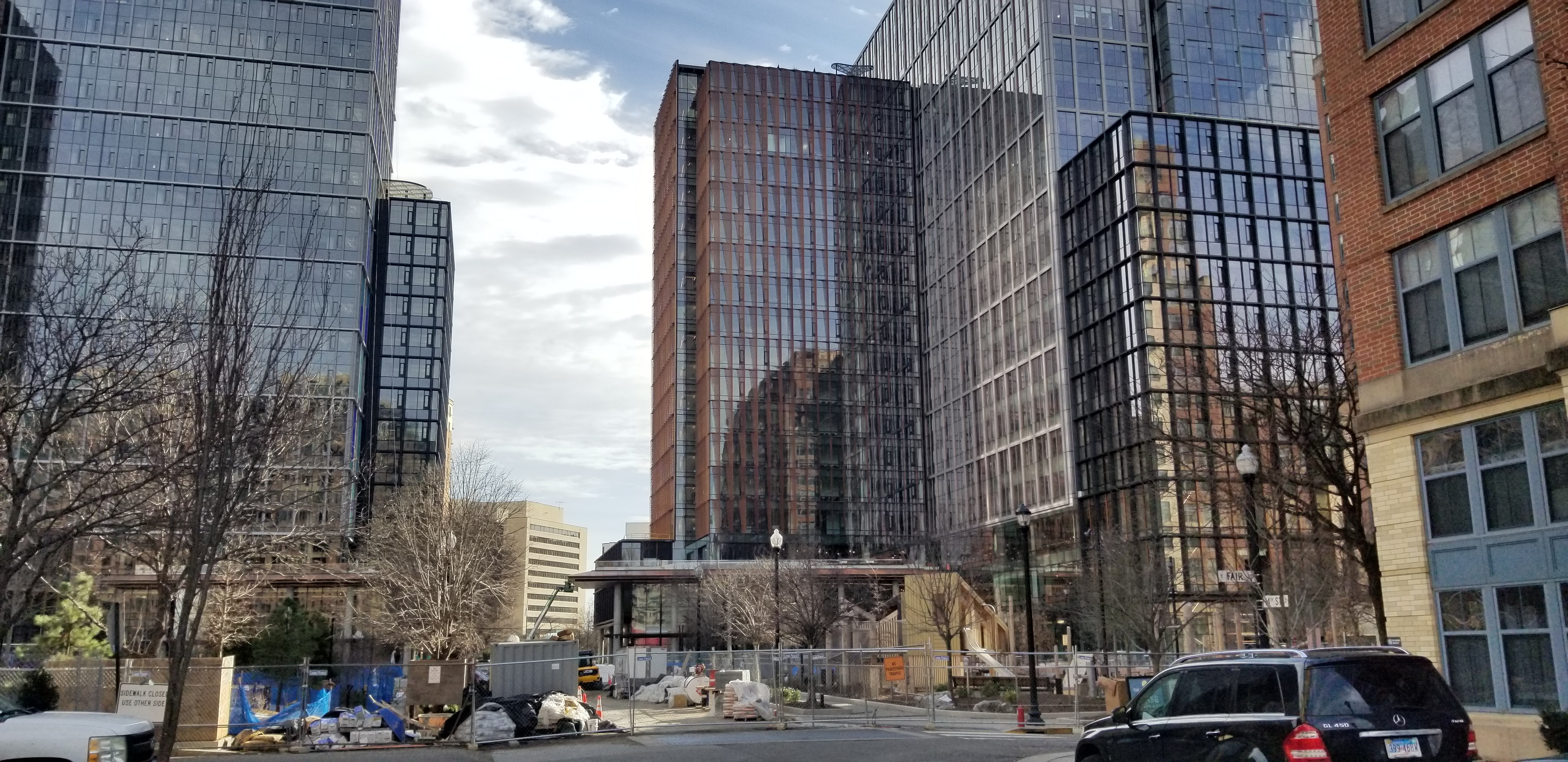
The Metropolitan Park office complex during construction in February 2023

Amazon moved its first employees into rented office space in the area in June 2019, and in June 2020, there were roughly 1,000 employees the company counted as HQ2 workers.

ZGF Architects led the design team, which included James Corner Field Operations and VIKA Civil Engineering and Site Design. In January 2020 developer JBG Smith started construction on two 22-story towers at 1450 S. Eads St, proximate to Metropolitan Park. In September 2020, Amazon began the $14 million renovation of the park. By March 2023, 8,000 workers had been hired to occupy the first phase of HQ2, which has a total capacity of 14,000 workers.

The development also includes a public art installation called "Queen City", in the middle of Metropolitan Park. It was designed by artist Nekisha Durrett and pays tribute to a former Black community by the same name that was demolished during the construction of The Pentagon.

=== Phase 2: PenPlace and The Helix ===
In February 2021, the company announced a proposed design for the second phase of HQ2, PenPlace, to be developed by JBG Smith. The development includes "The Helix", a 354-foot glass nucleic acid double helix art structure with landscaped terrain that would be opened to the public, similar to "Amazon Spheres" at Doppler in Seattle. Founder Jeff Bezos commented that "The natural beauty of a double helix can be seen throughout our world, from the geometry of our own DNA to the elemental form of galaxies, weather patterns, pine cones, and seashells". The Verge described it as resembling a "glass poop emoji covered in trees."

In November 2021, the Federal Aviation Administration determined that the structure would not be a hazard to air traffic at nearby Ronald Reagan Washington National Airport.

The Arlington County Board approved Phase II of HQ2, including the "Helix" in April 2022.

In March 2023, the company delayed plans to develop the second phase of HQ2.

In 2024, Amazon delayed its plan to reach 25,000 jobs in HQ2 until 2038.

In September 2025, Amazon received its first public subsidies related to HQ2, $81,000 related to excess hotel taxes generated.
