= National Landing =

Area in Northern Virginia

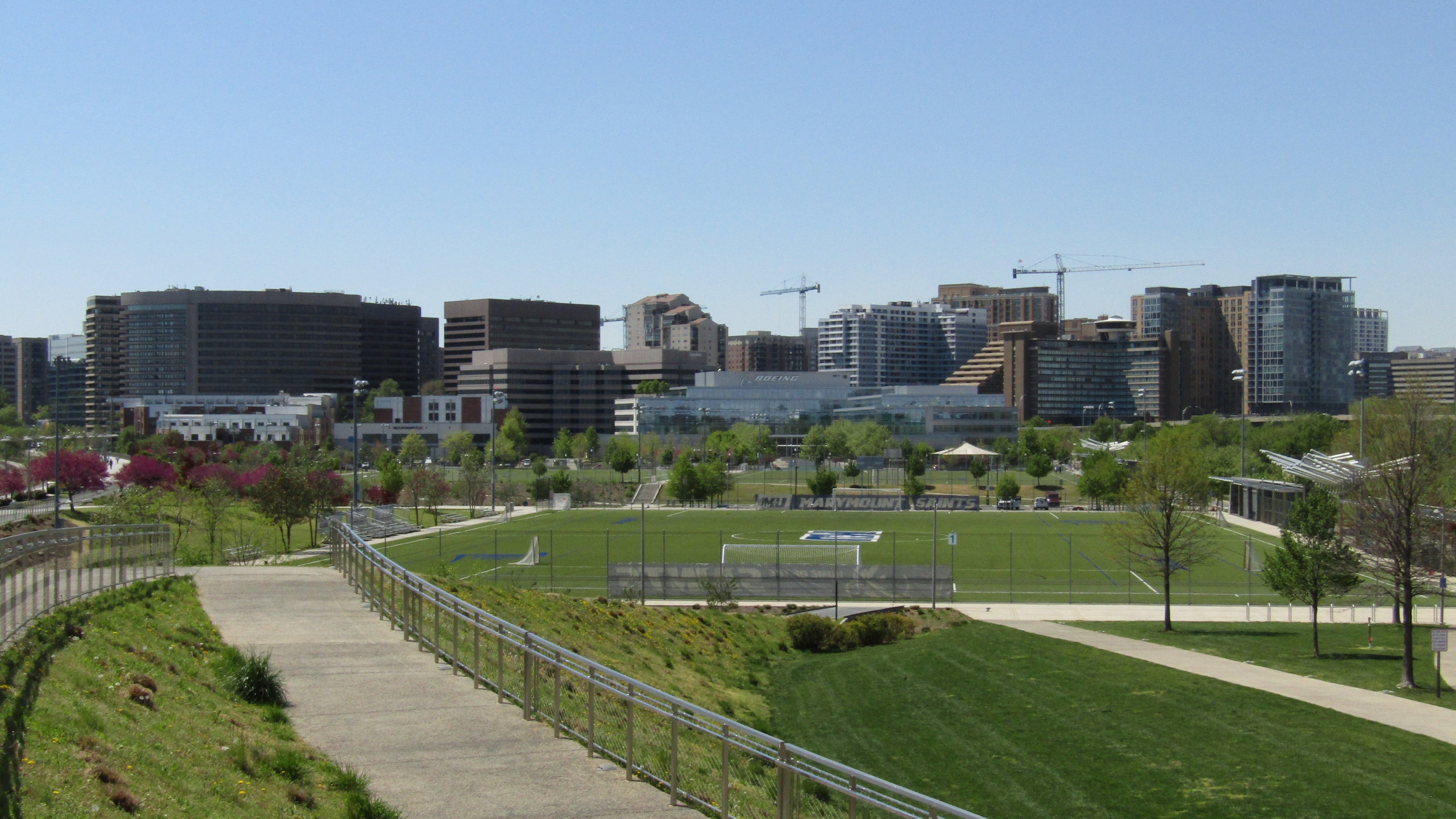
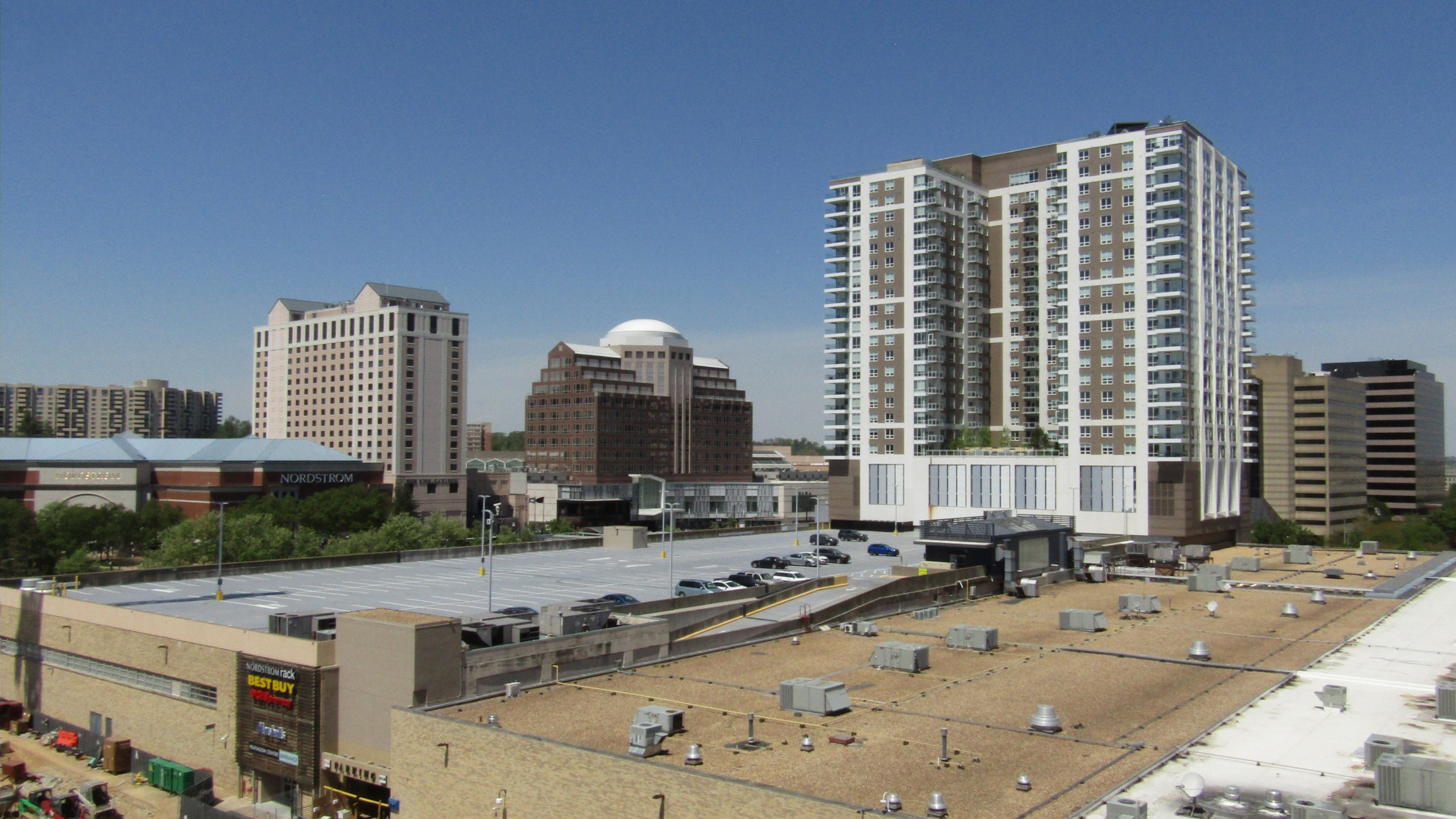
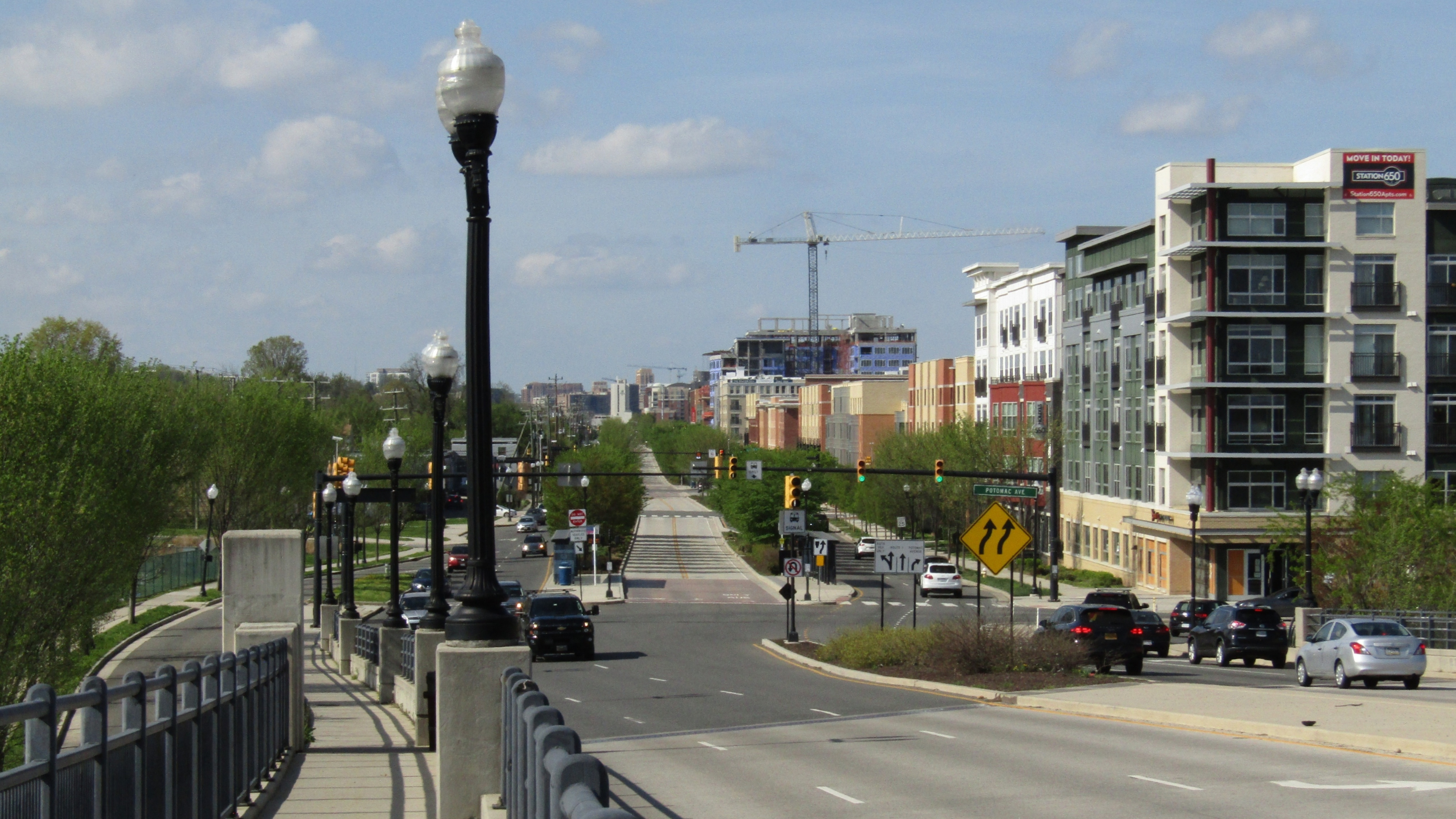
From top to bottom: Crystal City, Pentagon City (both in Arlington County), and Potomac Yard (in Alexandria)
National Landing is in Northern Virginia (shown in yellow), near Washington, D.C. (pink) and Maryland (gray).

National Landing is an area in Northern Virginia encompassing parts of the Crystal City and Pentagon City neighborhoods of Arlington County and the Potomac Yard neighborhood in the city of Alexandria. It is the location of Amazon's second headquarters.

In 2018, the neighborhood was branded and announced as "National Landing" as part of a local economic development plan to bring Amazon HQ2 to the area. The announcement also included plans to build a graduate-school satellite university campus of Virginia Tech in the area. The "National Landing" name derives, in part, from the area's proximity to Ronald Reagan Washington National Airport.

== Branding campaign ==
When the name "National Landing" was announced on November 13, 2018 for the Amazon HQ2 launch, it met with significant confusion and mockery since locals had never heard this name before and did not feel that "National Landing" was a real place. Prior to the Amazon announcement, "National Landing" was not used by locals.

While initial comments suggested Amazon was changing the name of Crystal City unilaterally, local officials explained that the region included more than just Crystal City, and that the name and branding campaign came from the local jurisdictions and their economic development committees (Arlington Economic Development and the Alexandria Economic Development Partnership), in partnership with Amazon and developer JBG Smith. The rebranding is not expected to change the names of the existing neighborhoods, like Crystal City, but instead to serve as an umbrella term.

== Redevelopment history ==
=== Oakville Triangle redevelopment and Virginia Tech Innovation Campus ===
Even before the Amazon HQ2 announcement, development in the National Landing area had been in the works. In June 2013, The Blackstone Group acquired industrial properties from First Potomac Realty Trust. StonebridgeCarras, on behalf of landowner The Blackstone Group was employed to redevelop the Oakville Triangle, a 20-acre industrial park. Consultations about the Oakville Triangle development began with the local community groups in 2014 with groundbreaking to occur summer of 2017 and first 1 million-square-foot phase to open in Summer 2019.

In March 2018, the Oakville Triangle project reportedly stalled, while Virginia Tech officials met with Amazon to discuss "Project Cooper," Virginia Tech's plan for an "innovation neighborhood." On November 3, 2018, Virginia Tech signed a memorandum of understanding with the City of Alexandria to put its new Innovation Center at Oakville Triangle, a decision announced in tandem with the HQ2 announcement on November 13.

=== Potomac Yard redevelopment ===
In Summer 2015, developer JBG Companies indicated a desire to begin the process for redevelopment of North Potomac Yard. In June 2016, Alexandria completed revisions to the 2010 plan and adopted a new the North Potomac Yard Small Area Plan. This plan included plans for a new Metro station, the Potomac Yard station. The plan also "anticipates approximately 1.3 million square feet of mixed-use development to include office, hotel, residential, and concentrated areas of retail within a 1/4 mile of the new Metrorail station."

== Transportation ==
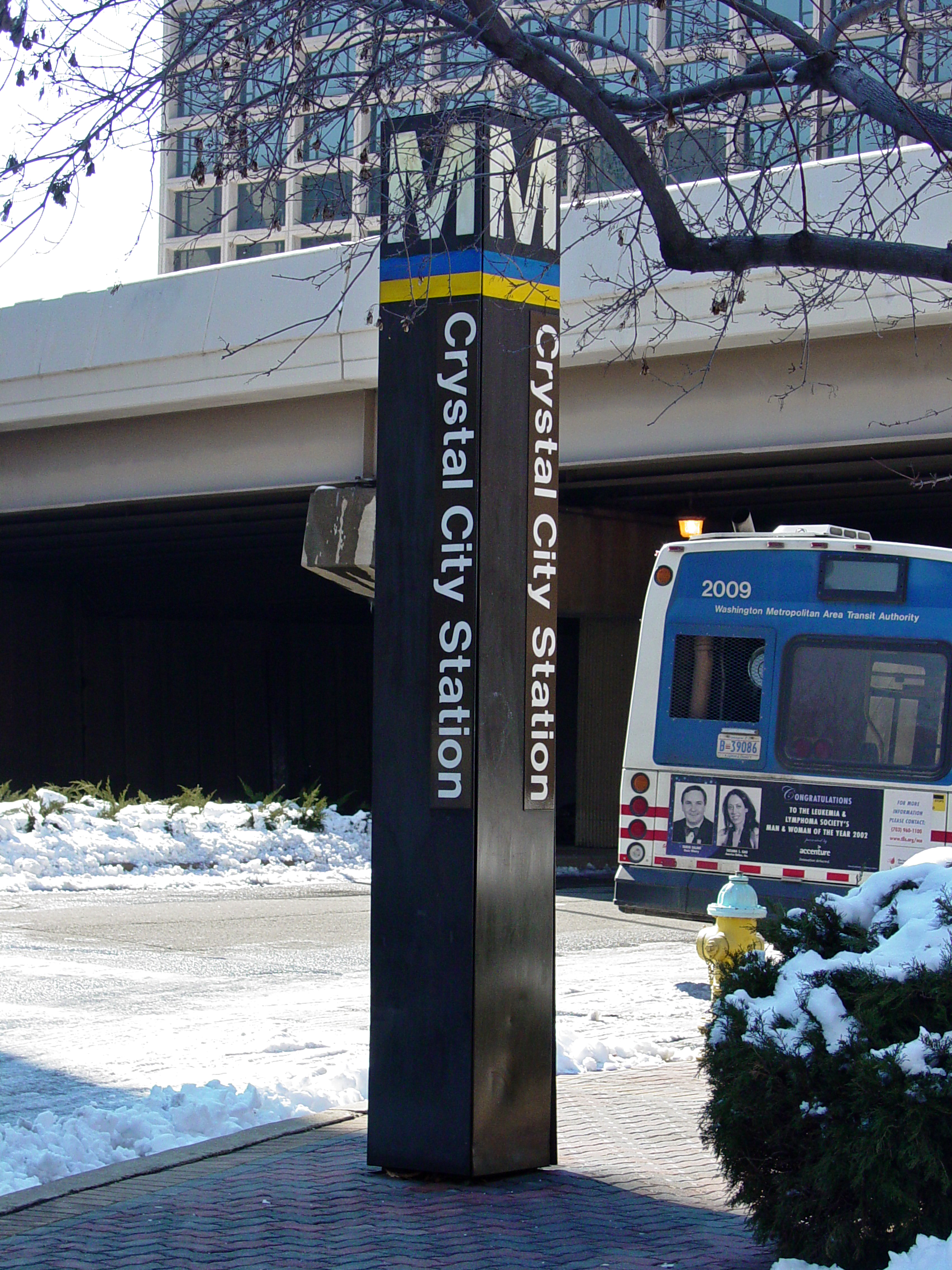
The entrance to Crystal City station

The area includes the Crystal City station & Potomac Yard station of the Washington Metro . The Virginia Railway Express (VRE) commuter rail system also has a Crystal City station. The Metroway, a bus rapid transit, runs through the area, with 15 stations covering the area from Arlington's Pentagon City station to Alexandria's Braddock Road station (south of National Landing), with some of this route located in an exclusive busway. Future planning for the area includes a pedestrian bridge to connect National Landing to Reagan National Airport and improvements to the existing Metro rail stations.
