= First Potomac Realty Trust =

Real estate investment trust

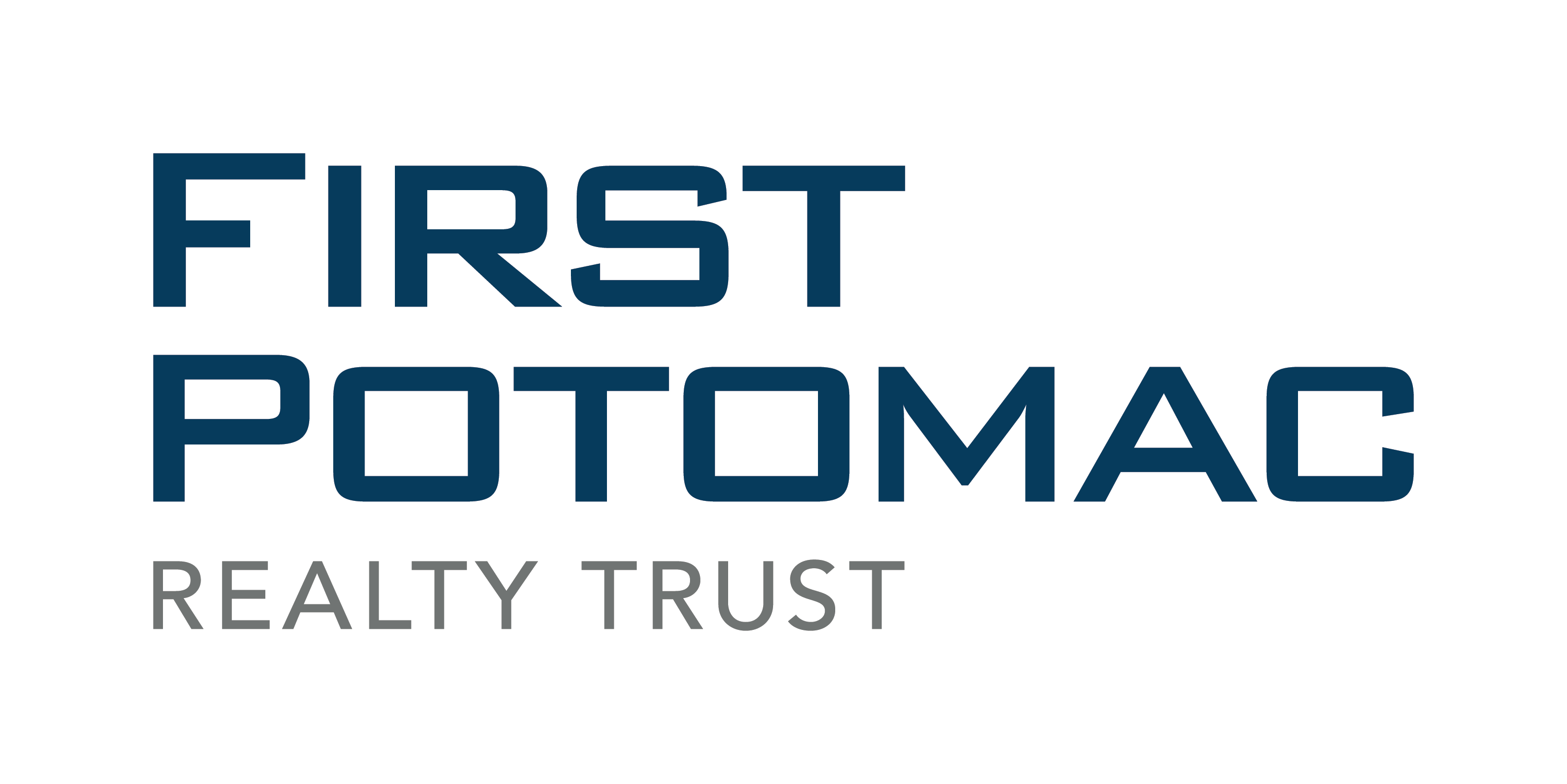
- Industry: Real estate investment trust
- Founded: 1997; 29 years ago
- Founder: Douglas J. Donatelli; Nicholas R. Smith
- Defunct: October 2, 2017; 8 years ago
- Fate: Acquired by Government Properties Income Trust
- Headquarters: Bethesda, Maryland
- Key people: Terry L. Stevens, Chairman; Robert Milkovich, President & CEO; Andrew P. Blocher, CFO
- Revenue: $0.160 billion (2016)
- Net income: $0.009 billion (2016)
- Total assets: $1.260 billion (2016)
- Total equity: $0.436 billion (2016)
- Number of employees: 120 (2016)

First Potomac Realty Trust was a real estate investment trust that invested in industrial properties and business parks in the suburbs of the Washington metropolitan area. In 2017, it was acquired by Government Properties Income Trust.

== Assets ==
As of December 31, 2016, the company wholly owned properties totaling 6.7 million square feet and owned an additional 0.9 million square feet via joint ventures. The company's largest tenant was the federal government of the United States, which accounted for 16% of rents in 2016.

== Timeline ==
The company was founded in 1997 by Douglas J. Donatelli and Nicholas R. Smith.

In October 2003, the company became a public company via an initial public offering, raising $112.5 million.

In 2010, the company acquired 440 First St NW for $15.3 million and 1211 Connecticut Ave for $49.5 million.

In June 2013, the company sold the majority of its industrial portfolio to an affiliate of The Blackstone Group for $241.5 million.

In March 2015, the company sold its properties in Richmond, Virginia for $60 million.

In November 2015, Robert Milkovich was appointed chief executive officer of the company and founders Douglas J. Donatelli and Nicholas R. Smith resigned from the company.

In March 2016, the company sold 26 buildings in Northern Virginia for net proceeds of $90.5 million.

== Acquisition ==
In October 2017, the company was acquired by Government Properties Income Trust.

== See also ==
- Rouse Properties
