= JBG Smith =

Real estate investment trust

JBG SMITH Properties
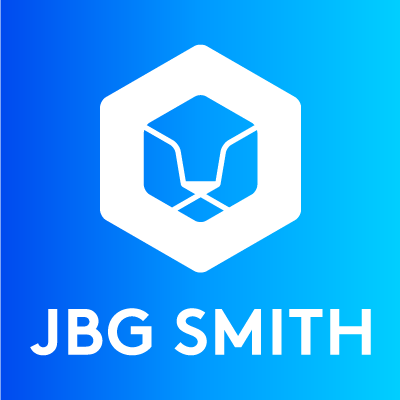

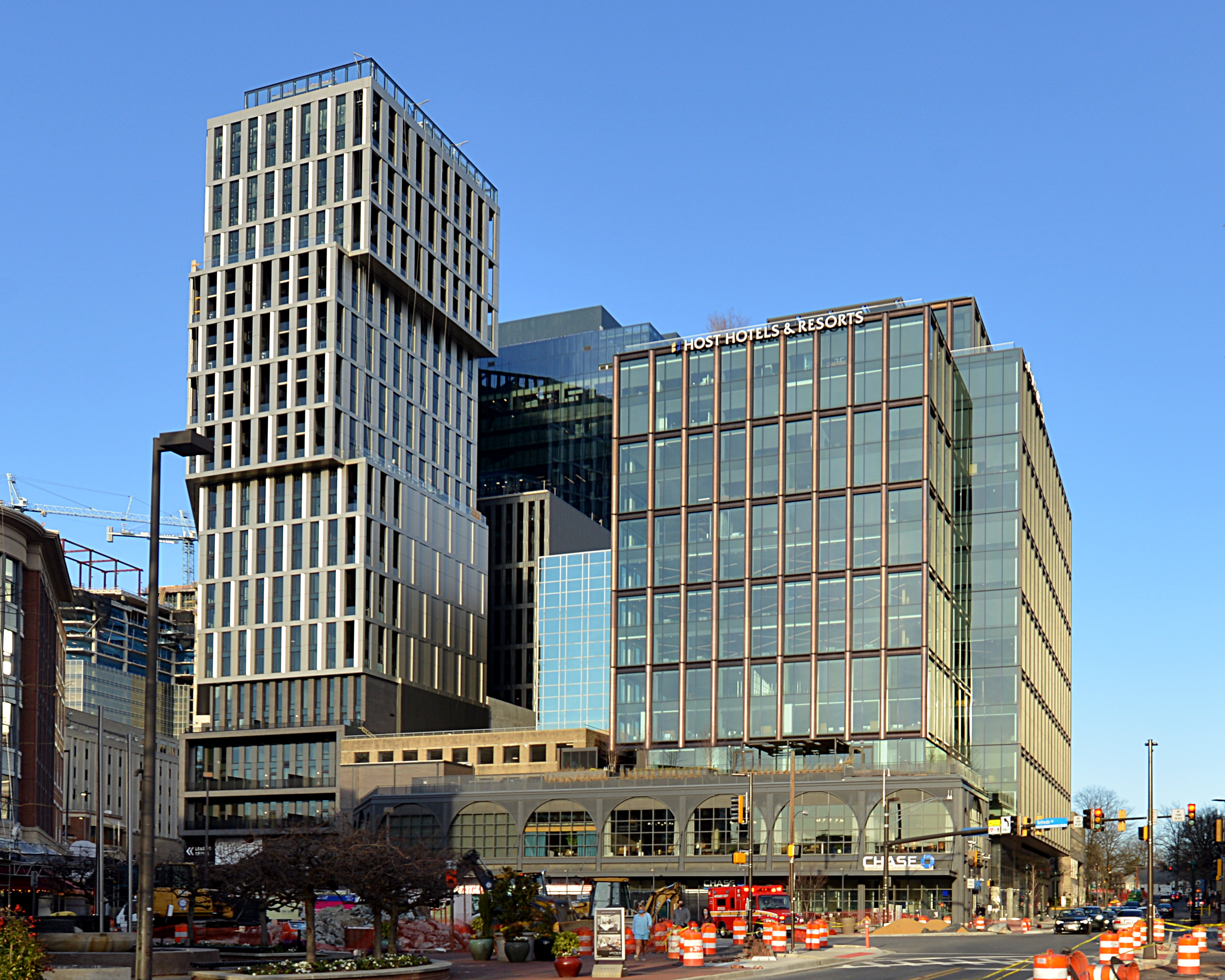
- Bethesda headquarters
- Type: Public company
- Traded as: NYSE: JBGS; S&P 600 component
- Industry: Real estate investment trust
- Predecessor: The JBG Companies; Charles Smith Companies; Miller, Brown & Gildenhorn
- Founded: 1957; 69 years ago
- Headquarters: Bethesda, Maryland
- Area served: Washington metropolitan area
- Key people: W. Matthew Kelly, CEO; Moina Banerjee, CFO; Kai Reynolds, Chief Development Officer; George Xanders, Chief Investment Officer
- Revenue: ▼$547 million (2024)
- Net income: ▼ -$143 million (2024)
- Total assets: ▼$5.020 billion (2024)
- Total equity: ▼$1.809 billion (2024)
- Number of employees: 645 (2024)
- Website: www.jbgsmith.com

JBG SMITH Properties is a publicly traded real estate investment trust based in Bethesda, Maryland.

As of December 31, 2024, the company owned 38 operating properties including 16 apartment complexes with 6,781 units, 20 commercial properties comprising 6.3 million square feet, and two properties on which it collects ground rent. It also owned two additional apartment complexes under construction and had 19 properties in its development pipeline. All of the company's properties are in the Washington metropolitan area, mostly in National Landing, almost all of which are accessible by the Washington Metro.

== History ==
In late 1956, three attorneys—Gerald J. Miller, Donald A. Brown, and Joseph Bernard Gildenhorn—formed a real estate law practice in Rockville, Maryland called Miller, Brown & Gildenhorn. In 1962, after realizing that it was more profitable to develop on their own account, the company changed to a real estate development company and Benjamin A. Jacobs joined the firm.

In 1969, Miller was replaced with Jacobs and the company changed its name to JBG Associates. In the late 1980s, the company was among the first real estate development firms in the DC area to redevelop properties for third-party clients for a set fee. This strategy helped the company survive the early 1990s recession. The company aggressively acquired several properties after the early 1990s recession. With 26 buildings in its portfolio in the early 1990s, the company considered an initial public offering, although it did not happen.

By 1997, the company had an ownership interest in 21 commercial properties, including many office buildings, two hotels and one shopping center. It sold most of its assets to Trizec Properties in 1997 for $560 million. The deal did not include 10 apartment projects owned by JBG. The sale helped raise capital for the firm. But with a smaller portfolio, the company also shed most of its staff, and only 15 people remained with the firm and Brown and Gildenhorn retired from daily management.

In 1999, the company decided on a new investment strategy, seeking individual, and later institutional, investors that gave the firm access to funds it could use at its discretion. The first investment fund closed in 2002, and its first institutional investor was the financial endowment of Yale University. By fall 2012, JBG had established 8 investment funds and raised $5.5 billion; several of the funds were specifically created just for investment by Yale.

In 2005, JBG recapitalized several office buildings by selling a stake in the buildings to Morgan Stanley for $644 million. In August 2007, the company formed a joint venture with MacFarlane Partners to develop several properties. By 2011, the company had $10 billion in assets. That year, Jacobs retired as managing member.

In 2013, the company was named as the most active real estate developer in the Washington, DC metropolitan area. The company opened a real estate investment fund called JBG/Fund IX on March 17, 2014, and by September 2014, the company had raised $680 million. In July 2017, the company merged with Charles E. Smith Companies, a subsidiary of Vornado Realty Trust that owned its assets in the Washington, DC metropolitan area. The company changed its name to JBG Smith and was spun off into a public company.

In November 2018, as part of the Amazon HQ2 initiative, Amazon agreed to buy land at National Landing with 4.1 million developable square feet from JBG Smith and hired JBG Smith to develop and manage the sites.
