= List of villages in Sergipe =

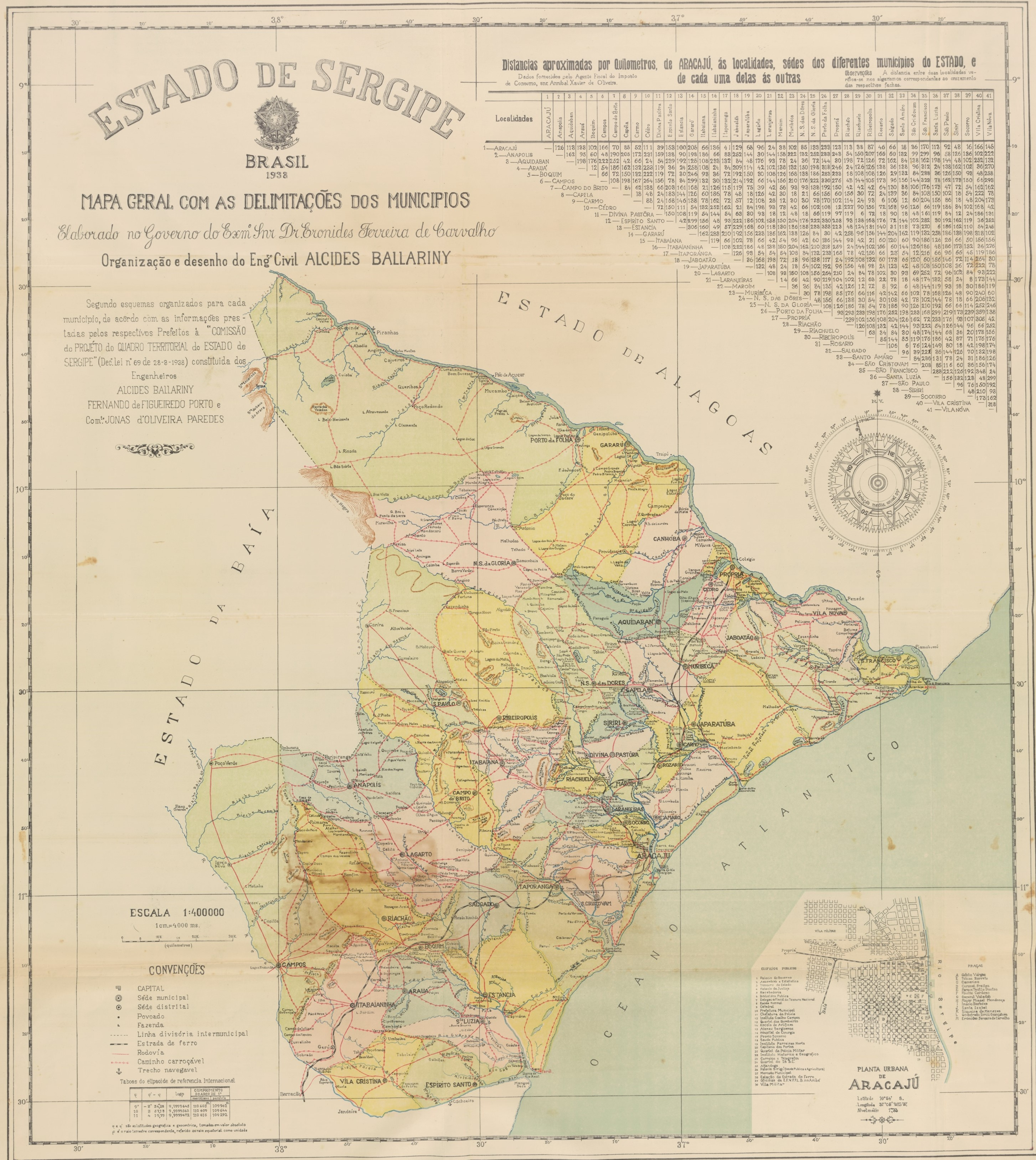
A 1938 map of Sergipe

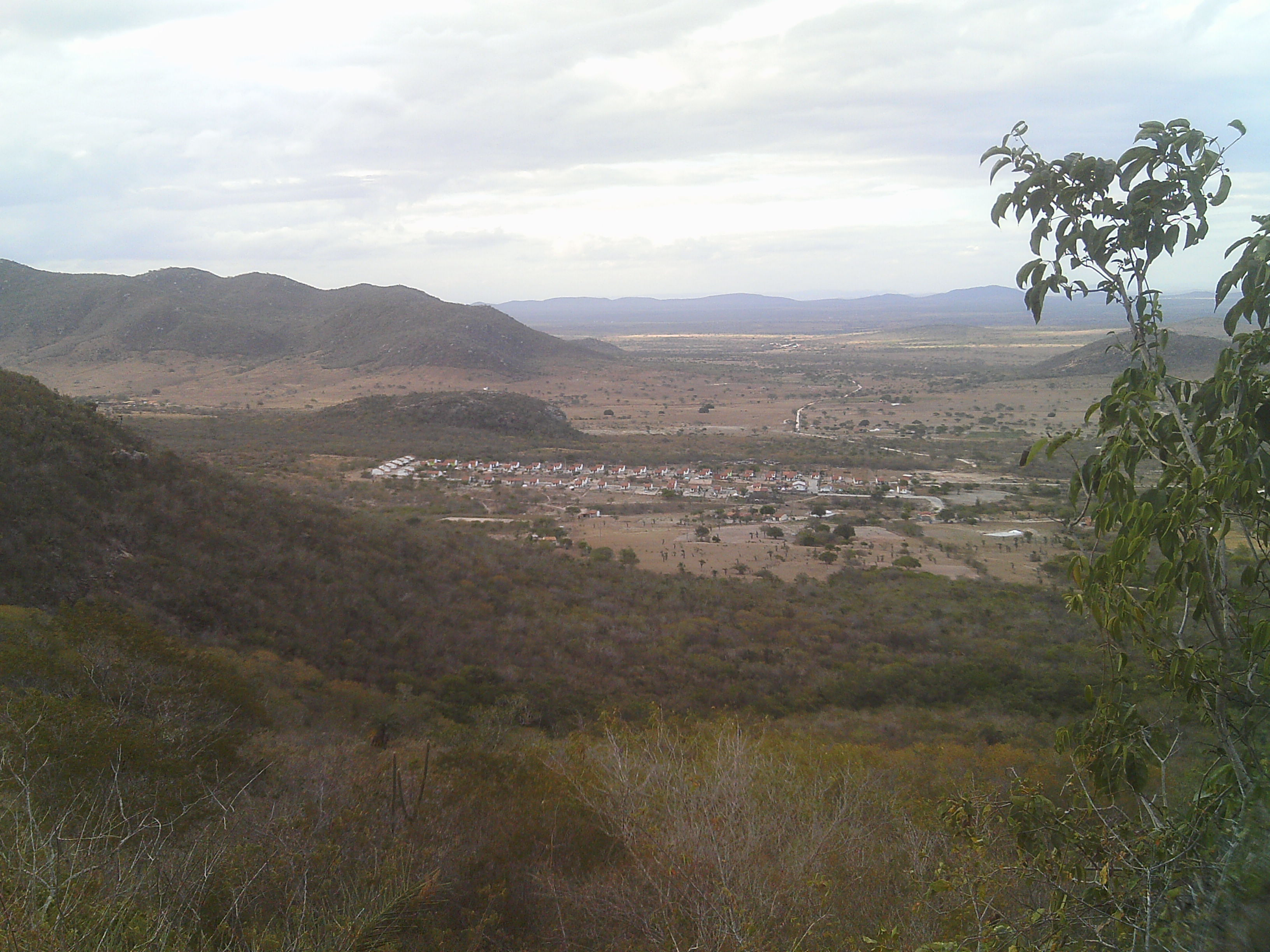
The village of Guia, Poço Redondo

The Northeastern Brazilian state of Sergipe is composed of over 1500 villages spread across 75 municipalities, many of which originated from the formation of quilombos. Villages are settlements located in the rural areas of municipalities, with populations varying from dozens to thousands.

== Agreste Sergipano ==
=== Central Agreste Microregion ===
Municipality	Village	Population (2022)
Areia Branca	Areias	562᠎᠎
Areia Branca	Boqueirão	112᠎᠎
Areia Branca	Canjinha	260᠎᠎
Areia Branca	Caroba	287᠎᠎
Areia Branca	Chico Gomes	298᠎᠎
Areia Branca	Colônia São Paulo	᠎᠎
Areia Branca	Guidinha	᠎᠎
Areia Branca	Junco	1346᠎᠎
Areia Branca	Manilha de Baixo	᠎᠎
Areia Branca	Pedrinhas	1468᠎᠎
Areia Branca	Rio das Pedras	᠎᠎
Areia Branca	Serra Comprida	394᠎᠎
Areia Branca	Cajueiro	157
Frei Paulo	Alagadiço	᠎᠎1443
Frei Paulo	Areias	80᠎᠎
Frei Paulo	Barro Branco	᠎᠎
Frei Paulo	Cambranganza	᠎᠎
Frei Paulo	Catuabo	569᠎᠎
Frei Paulo	Coité dos Borges	᠎᠎
Frei Paulo	Coito	᠎᠎
Frei Paulo	Mocambo	1362᠎᠎
Frei Paulo	Saquinho	᠎᠎
Frei Paulo	Selão	᠎᠎
Frei Paulo	Serras Pretas	᠎᠎
Frei Paulo	Serra Redonda	639᠎᠎
Carira	Altos Verdes	827᠎᠎
Carira	Baixa Grande	328᠎᠎
Carira	Bonfim	171᠎᠎
Carira	Campos Novos	᠎᠎
Carira	Contendas de Baixo	᠎᠎
Carira	Contendas de Cima	139᠎᠎
Carira	Cutias	263᠎᠎
Carira	Descoberto	836᠎᠎᠎᠎
Carira	Divisa	193
Carira	Edimilson Oliveira	146᠎᠎
Carira	Fazendinha	291᠎᠎
Carira	Gameleira	᠎᠎
Carira	Lagoa Grande	᠎᠎
Carira	Luís Carlos Prestes	᠎᠎
Carira	Macacos	᠎᠎
Carira	Manoel Martins	260᠎᠎
Carira	Massaranduba	779᠎᠎
Carira	Pulgas	᠎᠎
Carira	Roseli Nunes	᠎᠎
Carira	Saco Torto	᠎᠎
Carira	Santa Maria	᠎᠎
Carira	Santo Antônio	140᠎᠎
Carira	São Cristóvão	121᠎᠎
Carira	Três Tanques	᠎᠎
Pinhão	Vaza Barris	366᠎᠎
Pinhão	Lagoa Branca	128᠎᠎
Pinhão	Beija-Flor de Baixo	᠎᠎
Pinhão	Baixa Larga	᠎᠎
Pedra Mole	Gravatá	266᠎᠎
Pedra Mole	Tapado	369᠎᠎
Pedra Mole	São José da Quixabeira	᠎᠎
Pedra Mole	Zumbi dos Palmares	᠎᠎
Macambira	Caatinga Redonda	᠎᠎
Macambira	Lagoa Seca	᠎᠎
Macambira	Barro Preto	465᠎᠎
Macambira	Boa Vista	276᠎᠎
Macambira	Tauá	180᠎᠎
Macambira	Matadouro	117᠎᠎
Macambira	Venturinho	᠎᠎
Macambira	Pé e Serra	452᠎᠎
Macambira	Jacoquinha	᠎᠎
Macambira	Manuíno	᠎᠎
Campo do Brito	Brito Velho	116᠎᠎
Campo do Brito	Caatinga	᠎᠎
Campo do Brito	Candeiras	᠎᠎
Campo do Brito	Cercado	523
Campo do Brito	Gameleira	1169
Campo do Brito	Ceilão	254
Campo do Brito	Garangau	720᠎᠎
Campo do Brito	Iraque	᠎᠎
Campo do Brito	Boa Vista	174᠎᠎
Campo do Brito	Muginga	᠎᠎
Campo do Brito	Poço Comprida	᠎᠎
Campo do Brito	Riacho do Esteiro	᠎᠎
Campo do Brito	Rodeador	᠎᠎
Campo do Brito	Serra das Minas	183᠎᠎
Campo do Brito	Tapera da Serra	346᠎᠎
Campo do Brito	Terra Vermelha	385
Itabaiana	Agrovila	523᠎᠎
Itabaiana	Água Branca	᠎᠎
Itabaiana	Barro Preto	161᠎᠎
Itabaiana	Bastião	᠎᠎
Itabaiana	Batula	
Itabaiana	Bom Jardim	762᠎᠎
Itabaiana	Bo	
Itabaiana	Cabeça do Russo	207᠎᠎
Itabaiana	Boqueirão	
Itabaiana	Cajaíba	641᠎᠎
Itabaiana	Cajueiral	᠎᠎
Itabaiana	Cachoeira	
Itabaiana	Canário	
Itabaiana	Chapéu do Sol	᠎᠎
Itabaiana	Caraíbas	᠎᠎
Itabaiana	Carrilho	869᠎᠎
Itabaiana	Carvalho	
Itabaiana	Caatinguinha	
Itabaiana	Ciebra	᠎᠎
Itabaiana	Congo	75᠎᠎
Itabaiana	Dendezeiro	᠎᠎
Itabaiana	Dunga	
Itabaiana	Esperança	
Itabaiana	Estreito	
Itabaiana	Fazenda Grande	
Itabaiana	Flechas	᠎᠎
Itabaiana	Forno	203᠎᠎
Itabaiana	Gandu	᠎᠎
Itabaiana	Guandu	192᠎᠎
Itabaiana	Igreja Velha	᠎᠎
Itabaiana	Jorge	283
Itabaiana	João Gomes	
Itabaiana	Lagamar	133᠎᠎
Itabaiana	Lagoa do Forno	347
Itabaiana	Malhada Velha	᠎᠎
Itabaiana	Mangabeira	544᠎᠎
Itabaiana	Mangueira	605᠎᠎
Itabaiana	Marcela	
Itabaiana	Mandeme	᠎᠎
Itabaiana	Mariquinha	᠎᠎
Itabaiana	Matapoã	᠎᠎
Itabaiana	Moita Formosa	
Itabaiana	Murici	
Itabaiana	Nicó	117
Itabaiana	Oiteiro do Capim	
Itabaiana	Pé de Veado	᠎᠎
Itabaiana	Poço Dantas	
Itabaiana	Poção	᠎᠎
Itabaiana	Prensa	᠎᠎
Itabaiana	Queimadas	5189
Itabaiana	Riacho Doce	801᠎᠎
Itabaiana	Ribeira	306᠎᠎
Itabaiana	Rio das Pedras	1902᠎᠎
Itabaiana	Roncador	᠎᠎
Itabaiana	Sambaíba	᠎᠎
Itabaiana	São José	᠎᠎
Itabaiana	Serra	᠎᠎
Itabaiana	Serra do Cágado	
Itabaiana	Sitio Novo	
Itabaiana	Sobrado	201᠎᠎
Itabaiana	Tabuleiro da Telha	
Itabaiana	Tabuleiro do Chico	
Itabaiana	Tabocas	671᠎᠎
Itabaiana	Taperinha	᠎᠎
Itabaiana	Telha	᠎᠎
Itabaiana	Terra Dura	518᠎᠎
Itabaiana	Terra Vermelha	᠎᠎
Itabaiana	Várzea do Gama	387᠎᠎
Itabaiana	Vermelho	359᠎᠎
Itabaiana	Zanguê	᠎᠎
São Domingos	Saco	᠎᠎
São Domingos	Conselho	᠎᠎
São Domingos	Mangabeira	335᠎᠎
São Domingos	Mulungu	259᠎᠎
São Domingos	Lagoa	᠎᠎
São Domingos	Peço Arara	᠎᠎
São Domingos	Campanha	᠎᠎
São Domingos	Periperi	᠎᠎
São Domingos	Tapera	᠎᠎
Malhador	Pica Pau	᠎᠎
Malhador	Antas	167᠎᠎
Malhador	Palmeira	905᠎᠎
Malhador	Tábua	᠎᠎
Malhador	Cova da Mata	᠎᠎
Malhador	Saco Torto	853᠎᠎
Malhador	Alecrim	1035᠎᠎
Malhador	Poço Terreiro	᠎᠎
Malhador	Adique	᠎᠎
Malhador	Tingir	᠎᠎
Moita Bonita	Candeias	᠎᠎801
Moita Bonita	Capunga	1020᠎᠎
Moita Bonita	Cantinho	᠎᠎
Moita Bonita	Saquinho	122᠎᠎
Moita Bonita	Campo Grande	᠎᠎
Moita Bonita	Piabas	᠎᠎
Ribeirópolis	Serra do Machado	816᠎᠎
Ribeirópolis	Esteios	᠎᠎
Ribeirópolis	Fazendinha	᠎᠎
Ribeirópolis	Lagoa d'Água	᠎᠎
Ribeirópolis	Pinhão	᠎᠎
Ribeirópolis	Malhada das Capelas	᠎᠎
Ribeirópolis	Milagres	᠎᠎
Ribeirópolis	Salgado	᠎᠎
Ribeirópolis	Lagoa da Mata	᠎᠎
Ribeirópolis	Ouricuri	᠎᠎
Ribeirópolis	Oiteiro do Capim	᠎᠎
Ribeirópolis	Velame	᠎᠎
Ribeirópolis	Queimadas	᠎᠎
São Miguel do Aleixo	Jenipapo	᠎᠎
São Miguel do Aleixo	Lagoa dos Tamboris	150᠎᠎
São Miguel do Aleixo	Paraíso de São Pedro	197᠎᠎
São Miguel do Aleixo	Patos	᠎᠎
Nossa Senhora Aparecida	Cruz das Graças	495᠎᠎
Nossa Senhora Aparecida	Lajes	451᠎᠎
Nossa Senhora Aparecida	Curralinho	᠎᠎
Nossa Senhora Aparecida	Lagoa do Caroá	᠎᠎
Nossa Senhora Aparecida	Bom Sucesso	᠎᠎
Nossa Senhora Aparecida	Salgadinho	᠎᠎
Nossa Senhora Aparecida	Itacoatiara	᠎᠎
Nossa Senhora Aparecida	Tabuleiro	᠎᠎
Nossa Senhora Aparecida	Paturi	᠎᠎

=== Central South Microregion ===
Municipality	Village	Population (2022)
Lagarto	Curralinho	᠎᠎
Lagarto	Tanque	385᠎᠎
Lagarto	Cajazeira	᠎᠎
Lagarto	Candeal da Canjazeira	᠎᠎
Lagarto	Rio das Vacas	᠎᠎
Lagarto	Mangabeira	᠎᠎
Lagarto	Poção	421᠎᠎
Lagarto	Colônia Treze	7217᠎᠎
Lagarto	Periquito Pelado	᠎᠎
Lagarto	Saco Grande	᠎᠎
Lagarto	Brejo	171᠎᠎
Lagarto	Brejo Baixo	᠎᠎
Lagarto	Brejo de Cima	189᠎᠎
Lagarto	Barragem	᠎᠎
Lagarto	Uzeda	᠎᠎
Lagarto	Cipó	᠎᠎
Lagarto	Sobrado	᠎᠎
Lagarto	Saco da Tapera	᠎᠎
Lagarto	Moita Redonda	᠎᠎
Lagarto	Várzea dos Cágados	᠎᠎
Lagarto	Itaperinha	᠎᠎
Lagarto	Pé de Serra	᠎᠎
Lagarto	Cova da Onça	᠎᠎
Lagarto	Luís Freire	᠎᠎
Lagarto	Açúzinho	889᠎᠎
Lagarto	Juerana	᠎᠎
Lagarto	Taboca	᠎᠎
Lagarto	Piçarreira	᠎᠎
Lagarto	Gravatá	365
Lagarto	Estancinha	309᠎᠎
Lagarto	Preguiça	᠎᠎
Lagarto	Limoreiro	᠎᠎
Lagarto	Timbales	᠎᠎
Lagarto	Gameleiro	᠎᠎
Lagarto	Marilopes	᠎᠎
Lagarto	Caraíbas	᠎᠎
Lagarto	Laranjeiras	᠎᠎
Lagarto	Açu Velho	᠎᠎
Lagarto	Uburutinga	᠎᠎
Lagarto	Boa Vista do Urubu	᠎᠎
Lagarto	Boa Vista	482
Lagarto	Karl Marx	100᠎᠎
Lagarto	Urubu Grande	᠎᠎
Lagarto	Britinho	᠎᠎
Lagarto	Brasília	3163᠎᠎
Lagarto	Alto	᠎᠎
Lagarto	Várzea do Espinho	᠎᠎
Lagarto	Araça	478᠎᠎
Lagarto	João Martins	᠎᠎
Lagarto	Jenipapo	3157᠎᠎
Lagarto	Quirino	᠎᠎
Lagarto	Camilo Torres	142᠎᠎
Lagarto	Mandela	43᠎᠎
Lagarto	Pindoba	125᠎᠎
Lagarto	João Amazonas	38᠎᠎
Lagarto	Campo do Crioulo	502᠎᠎
Lagarto	Crioulo de Cima	145᠎᠎
Lagarto	Tabuleiro	᠎᠎
Lagarto	Saco do Tigre	74᠎᠎
Lagarto	Santo Antônio	᠎᠎
Lagarto	Hernani Libório	᠎᠎
Lagarto	Vinte e Dois de Novembro	102᠎᠎
Lagarto	Muçurepe	᠎᠎
Lagarto	Caboclo	84᠎᠎
Lagarto	Oiteiros	194᠎᠎
Lagarto	Cavaleira	᠎᠎
Lagarto	Pururuca	370᠎᠎
Lagarto	Boeiro	᠎᠎
Lagarto	Fazenda de Cima	304
Lagarto	Morcego	᠎᠎
Lagarto	Quilombo	159᠎᠎
Lagarto	Tapera do Nico	᠎᠎
Lagarto	Coqueiro	᠎᠎
Lagarto	Coqueiro de Baixo	᠎᠎
Lagarto	Coqueiro de Cima	᠎᠎
Lagarto	Telhas	᠎᠎
Lagarto	Moreirinha	᠎᠎
Lagarto	Roseli Nunes	187᠎᠎
Lagarto	Che Guevara	366᠎᠎
Lagarto	Antônio Conselheiro	161᠎᠎
Lagarto	Tiradentes	᠎᠎
Lagarto	Mártires d'Eldorado	134᠎᠎
Lagarto	Rio Fundo	373᠎᠎
Lagarto	Candeal da Tapera	᠎᠎
Lagarto	Candeal	᠎᠎
Lagarto	Bonfim	᠎᠎
Lagarto	Carcará	᠎᠎
Lagarto	Flecha	᠎᠎
Lagarto	Mariquita de Cima	᠎᠎
Lagarto	Piabas	᠎᠎
Lagarto	Olhos d'Água	671᠎᠎
Lagarto	Saboeiro	᠎᠎
Lagarto	Palestina	᠎᠎
Lagarto	Cleomar Brandi	᠎᠎
Riachão do Dantas	Cutia	᠎᠎
Riachão do Dantas	Lagoa da Canafístula	᠎᠎
Riachão do Dantas	Olhos d'Água da Bica	᠎᠎
Riachão do Dantas	Carnaíba	᠎᠎
Riachão do Dantas	Alto do Alecrim	᠎᠎
Riachão do Dantas	Tanque Novo	2495᠎᠎
Riachão do Dantas	Lagoa Dua	᠎᠎
Riachão do Dantas	Caminho Novo	᠎᠎
Riachão do Dantas	Fazenda de Cima	᠎᠎
Riachão do Dantas	Bonfim	708᠎᠎
Riachão do Dantas	Renascer	᠎᠎
Riachão do Dantas	Colégio	᠎᠎
Riachão do Dantas	Barro Preto	306᠎᠎
Riachão do Dantas	Baixa do Frio	69᠎᠎
Riachão do Dantas	Alto da Baixa do Frio	192᠎᠎
Riachão do Dantas	Cipózinho	᠎᠎
Riachão do Dantas	Cipó Grande	᠎᠎
Riachão do Dantas	Vivaldo	181᠎᠎
Riachão do Dantas	Forras	407᠎᠎
Riachão do Dantas	Campo dos Veados	᠎᠎
Riachão do Dantas	Colônia Boqueirão	᠎᠎
Riachão do Dantas	Palmares	477᠎᠎
Riachão do Dantas	Cruz de Palmares	᠎᠎
Simão Dias	Galho Cortado	᠎᠎
Simão Dias	Maria Bonita	᠎᠎
Simão Dias	Lajinha	᠎᠎
Simão Dias	Curral dos Bois	472᠎᠎
Simão Dias	Aroeira	᠎᠎
Simão Dias	Poço d'Antas	᠎᠎
Simão Dias	Triunfo	1127᠎᠎
Simão Dias	Pau de Colher	332᠎᠎
Simão Dias	Coração de Maria	274᠎᠎
Simão Dias	Barnabé	᠎᠎
Simão Dias	Pau de Leite	210᠎᠎
Simão Dias	Fazenda Fabiana	᠎᠎
Simão Dias	Muriango	᠎᠎
Simão Dias	Candeal Grande	᠎᠎
Simão Dias	Saco do Capim	᠎᠎
Simão Dias	Pastinho	425᠎᠎
Simão Dias	Saco Grande	᠎᠎
Simão Dias	Mata do Peru	348᠎᠎
Simão Dias	Colônia Governador Valadares	᠎᠎
Simão Dias	Paracatu de Cima	᠎᠎
Simão Dias	Paracatu de Baixo	213᠎᠎
Simão Dias	Paracatu do Meio	᠎᠎
Simão Dias	Brinquinho	479᠎᠎
Simão Dias	Bonsucesso	᠎᠎
Simão Dias	Mato Verde	᠎᠎
Simão Dias	Deserto	᠎᠎
Simão Dias	Floresta	᠎᠎
Simão Dias	Cumbe	᠎᠎
Simão Dias	Espinheiro	᠎᠎
Simão Dias	Carlos Lamarca	᠎᠎
Simão Dias	Ilhotas	᠎᠎
Simão Dias	Jaqueira	128᠎᠎
Simão Dias	Salobra	552᠎᠎
Simão Dias	Pombo	᠎᠎
Simão Dias	Lagoa Seca	422᠎᠎
Simão Dias	Pirajá	219᠎᠎
Simão Dias	Muniz	160᠎᠎
Simão Dias	Pirajá de Baixo	82᠎᠎
Simão Dias	Sítio Alto	620᠎᠎
Simão Dias	Taboca	᠎᠎
Simão Dias	Caraíbas	᠎᠎
Simão Dias	Caraíbas de Baixo	᠎᠎
Simão Dias	Oito de Outubro	292᠎᠎
Simão Dias	Vinte e Sete de Outubro	᠎᠎
Simão Dias	Apertado de Pedra	᠎᠎
Simão Dias	Furnas	᠎᠎
Simão Dias	Canifístula	᠎᠎
Poço Verde	Lagoa do Junco	272᠎᠎
Poço Verde	Cedro	᠎᠎
Poço Verde	Ladeira do Tanquinho	111᠎᠎
Poço Verde	Borrocões	᠎᠎
Poço Verde	Urubuzinho	᠎᠎
Poço Verde	Malhada da Onça	᠎᠎
Poço Verde	Marco do Meio	᠎᠎
Poço Verde	Queimada Comprida	᠎᠎
Poço Verde	Malhadinha	᠎᠎
Poço Verde	Rio Real	455
Poço Verde	Mimoso	176᠎᠎
Poço Verde	Saquinho	᠎᠎
Poço Verde	Amargosa	᠎᠎
Poço Verde	Cachorro Morto	᠎᠎
Poço Verde	Campestre	᠎᠎
Poço Verde	Aroeira Velha	᠎᠎
Poço Verde	Umbuzeirão	᠎᠎
Poço Verde	Tanque Novo	᠎᠎
Poço Verde	Corimbas	᠎᠎
Poço Verde	Saco do Camisa	474᠎᠎
Poço Verde	Ponta da Serra	᠎᠎
Poço Verde	Bom Jardim	᠎᠎
Poço Verde	Santa Maria das Lajes	143᠎᠎
Poço Verde	Recanto	100᠎᠎
Poço Verde	São José	1211᠎᠎
Poço Verde	Cacimba Nova	᠎᠎
Poço Verde	Cova do Uilas	᠎᠎
Poço Verde	Cova da índia	᠎᠎
Poço Verde	Malhada Grande	᠎᠎
Poço Verde	São Francisco	᠎᠎
Poço Verde	Tabuleirinho	737᠎᠎
Tobias Barreto	Riacho das Pedras	᠎᠎
Tobias Barreto	Candeias	
Tobias Barreto	Roma	361
Tobias Barreto	Riacho Fundo	183
Tobias Barreto	Pau de Colher	135
Tobias Barreto	Borda da Mata	102᠎᠎
Tobias Barreto	Saquinho	121
Tobias Barreto	Tanque Grande	
Tobias Barreto	Água Boa	182
Tobias Barreto	Candeias	219
Tobias Barreto	Tábua	
Tobias Barreto	Cancelão	263᠎᠎
Tobias Barreto	Campo Pequeno	184
Tobias Barreto	Batatas	
Tobias Barreto	Jabeberi	882
Tobias Barreto	Agrovila	412
Tobias Barreto	Boiadeiro	66᠎᠎
Tobias Barreto	Nova Brasília	517
Tobias Barreto	Fontinha	141
Tobias Barreto	Barriga	416
Tobias Barreto	Capitôa	480
Tobias Barreto	Baixão	᠎᠎
Tobias Barreto	Campestre do Abreu	307
Tobias Barreto	Saco do Matias	117
Tobias Barreto	Madeiro	
Tobias Barreto	Tanque	
Tobias Barreto	Taquara	142
Tobias Barreto	Baixa da Jurubeba	᠎᠎
Tobias Barreto	Várzea do Jenipapo	
Tobias Barreto	Samambaia	1185
Tobias Barreto	Matinha	
Tobias Barreto	Pilões	249
Tobias Barreto	Jacaré	
Tobias Barreto	Sítio	
Tobias Barreto	Lagoa das Pedras	
Tobias Barreto	Pedra de Amolar	215
Tobias Barreto	Novo Marimbondo	173
Tobias Barreto	Alagoinhas	221
Tobias Barreto	Sotero	180
Tobias Barreto	Montes Coelho	1100
Tobias Barreto	Queimada Grande	129
Tobias Barreto	Arapuá	
Tobias Barreto	Taperinha	
Tobias Barreto	Zumbi	
Tobias Barreto	Poço da Clara	304
Tobias Barreto	Sariema	178
Tobias Barreto	Canaã	
Tobias Barreto	Curtume	211
Tobias Barreto	Mocambo	
Tobias Barreto	Belo Monte	
Tobias Barreto	Caraíbas	
Tobias Barreto	Macacos	

=== Central Sertão Microregion ===
Municipality	Village	Population (2022)
Aquidabã	Arranhento	᠎᠎
Aquidabã	Barra Salgada	᠎᠎
Aquidabã	Barreirinhos	᠎᠎
Aquidabã	Belém	᠎᠎
Aquidabã	Cajueiro	252᠎᠎
Aquidabã	Cajueiro dos Potes	164᠎᠎
Aquidabã	Campo Redondo	158᠎᠎
Aquidabã	Canivete	᠎᠎
Aquidabã	Capim do Boi	᠎᠎
Aquidabã	Caraíbas	151
Aquidabã	Carvão	᠎᠎
Aquidabã	Castanho	᠎᠎
Aquidabã	Coité	᠎᠎
Aquidabã	Corre Quatro	᠎᠎
Aquidabã	Cruz Grande	508᠎᠎
Aquidabã	Curralinho	᠎᠎
Aquidabã	Derradeiro Campo	᠎᠎
Aquidabã	Falcão	181᠎᠎
Aquidabã	Frutuoso	193᠎᠎
Aquidabã	Jenipapo	162᠎᠎
Aquidabã	Jurema	᠎᠎
Aquidabã	Lagoa da Caatinga	᠎᠎
Aquidabã	Lagoa da Jurema	᠎᠎
Aquidabã	Lagoa da Várzea	᠎᠎
Aquidabã	Lagoa do Mato	335᠎᠎
Aquidabã	Lagoa Seca	᠎᠎
Aquidabã	Lagoinha	᠎᠎
Aquidabã	Lagoinhas	᠎᠎
Aquidabã	Mamoeiro	121᠎᠎
Aquidabã	Moita Redonda	396᠎᠎
Aquidabã	Mocambo	256᠎᠎
Aquidabã	Mulungu	208᠎᠎
Aquidabã	Oiteiro	᠎᠎
Aquidabã	Oiteiro Alto	᠎᠎
Aquidabã	Papel de Santa Luzia	116᠎᠎
Aquidabã	Papel de Santo Antônio	157᠎᠎
Aquidabã	Papel dos Dias	᠎᠎
Aquidabã	Paraguai de Cima	᠎᠎
Aquidabã	Poço do Tigre	᠎᠎
Aquidabã	Queimada Grande	᠎᠎
Aquidabã	Saco de Areia	242᠎᠎
Aquidabã	Salgadinho	᠎᠎
Aquidabã	Santa Terezinha	561᠎᠎
Aquidabã	Segredo	246᠎᠎
Aquidabã	Tapuio	᠎᠎
Aquidabã	Taquara	᠎᠎
Aquidabã	Vaca Preta	᠎᠎
Itabi	Boa Hora	115᠎᠎
Itabi	Cangaia	᠎᠎
Itabi	Esperança	᠎᠎
Itabi	Lagoa dos Bichos	᠎᠎
Itabi	Lagoa Redonda	᠎᠎
Itabi	Mão Esquerda	᠎᠎
Itabi	Mata Grande	573᠎᠎
Itabi	Mocambo	᠎᠎
Itabi	Oiteiro Alto	᠎᠎
Gracho Cardoso	Bela Vista	᠎᠎
Gracho Cardoso	Caldeirão	᠎᠎
Gracho Cardoso	Gavião	184᠎᠎
Gracho Cardoso	Guedes	108᠎᠎
Gracho Cardoso	Manoel Velho	᠎᠎
Gracho Cardoso	Ponto Chique	205᠎᠎
Gracho Cardoso	Queimada Grande	᠎᠎
Gracho Cardoso	Queimadinha do Cardeal	᠎᠎
Gracho Cardoso	Riacho Grande	᠎᠎
Gracho Cardoso	Três Barras	᠎᠎
Cumbe	Araças	᠎᠎
Cumbe	Aroeiras	᠎᠎
Cumbe	Baixão	᠎᠎
Cumbe	Coité	᠎᠎
Cumbe	Forte	304᠎᠎
Cumbe	Jabuticaba	᠎᠎
Cumbe	Saco Grande	500᠎᠎
Cumbe	Tanque do Meio	᠎᠎
Feira Nova	Bandeira	᠎᠎
Feira Nova	Caboge	᠎᠎
Feira Nova	Lagoa dos Porcos	᠎᠎
Feira Nova	Malhada do Pau Ferro	150᠎᠎
Feira Nova	Mamonas	᠎᠎
Feira Nova	Mesinhas	᠎᠎
Feira Nova	São Domingos	᠎᠎
Feira Nova	Tabuado	᠎᠎
Feira Nova	Umbuzeiro	᠎᠎
Nossa Senhora das Dores	Campo Grande	208᠎᠎
Nossa Senhora das Dores	Sete Rios	᠎᠎
Nossa Senhora das Dores	Floresta	᠎᠎
Nossa Senhora das Dores	Belenzinho	
Nossa Senhora das Dores	Cruz	358᠎᠎
Nossa Senhora das Dores	Gado Bravo do Sul	206
Nossa Senhora das Dores	Gado Bravo do Norte	
Nossa Senhora das Dores	Gado Bravo	263᠎᠎
Nossa Senhora das Dores	Carro Quebrado	281᠎᠎
Nossa Senhora das Dores	Boa Vista	᠎᠎
Nossa Senhora das Dores	Sapé	755᠎᠎
Nossa Senhora das Dores	Bravo Urubu	228᠎᠎
Nossa Senhora das Dores	Borda da Mata	427
Nossa Senhora das Dores	Jatobá	409᠎᠎
Nossa Senhora das Dores	Ascenso	824
Nossa Senhora das Dores	Gentil Grande	817
Nossa Senhora das Dores	Varginha	᠎᠎
Nossa Senhora das Dores	Salobro	181᠎᠎
Nossa Senhora das Dores	Junco	᠎᠎
Nossa Senhora das Dores	Serra	81᠎᠎
Nossa Senhora das Dores	Sucupira	573᠎᠎
Nossa Senhora das Dores	Cajueiro	279᠎᠎
Nossa Senhora das Dores	Taboca	᠎᠎

== Litorial Sergipano ==
=== East Microregion ===
Municipality	Village	Population (2022)
Pirambu	Aguilhadas	331᠎᠎
Pirambu	Aningas	115᠎᠎
Pirambu	Lagoa Redonda	324᠎᠎
Pirambu	Maribondo	297᠎᠎
Pirambu	Catinguinhas	383
Pirambu	Bebedouro	111᠎᠎
Pirambu	Areinhas	250
Pirambu	Santa Isabel	108᠎᠎
Pirambu	Água Boa	
Pirambu	Alagamar	321᠎᠎
Pirambu	Baixa Grande	159᠎᠎
Japaratuba	Badajós	326᠎᠎
Japaratuba	Baixo da Areia	᠎᠎
Japaratuba	Camará	276᠎᠎
Japaratuba	Caraíbas	441᠎᠎
Japaratuba	Curral dos Bois	174᠎᠎
Japaratuba	Forges	201᠎᠎
Japaratuba	Moitas	᠎᠎
Japaratuba	Encruzilhada	176
Japaratuba	Mundo Novo	᠎᠎
Japaratuba	Patioba	580᠎᠎
Japaratuba	Porteira	᠎᠎
Japaratuba	Riachão	᠎᠎
Japaratuba	Saco	᠎᠎
Japaratuba	Timbó	311
Japaratuba	Sapucaia	239᠎᠎
Japaratuba	São José da Caatinga	2676᠎᠎
Japaratuba	Sibalde	290᠎᠎
Japaratuba	Travessão	195᠎᠎
Japaratuba	Várzea Verde	363᠎᠎
Carmópolis	Águada	2106᠎᠎
Carmópolis	Palmeira	650
Carmópolis	Fernando França	1245
General Maynard	Capim de Burro	᠎᠎᠎᠎
General Maynard	Intrudo	166᠎᠎᠎᠎
General Maynard	Intrudo de Cima	128᠎᠎᠎᠎
General Maynard	Pedro Gonçalves	᠎᠎᠎᠎
General Maynard	Pinga Fogo	382᠎᠎᠎᠎
General Maynard	Tábua de Baixo	44᠎᠎᠎᠎
Rosário do Catete	Siririzinho	775᠎᠎᠎᠎
Capela	Analício Barros	᠎᠎᠎᠎
Capela	Alto do Santo Antônio	155
Capela	Boa Vista	157
Capela	Carvão	398
Capela	Camboatá	
Capela	Campinhos	
Capela	Campo do Governo	
Capela	Canta Galo	397᠎᠎᠎᠎
Capela	Cafuba	342
Capela	Chapada do Aparecida	
Capela	Chicão	93
Capela	Chora	
Capela	Cuminho	668
Capela	Estreito	᠎᠎᠎᠎
Capela	Igrejinha	
Capela	José Emídio	
Capela	Lagoa Seca	
Capela	Lagoa Seca de Cima	110
Capela	Barracas	90
Capela	Oiti	
Capela	Camboatá	
Capela	Sobrado	
Capela	João Fernandes	
Capela	Cruz do Congo	
Capela	Terra Vermelha	
Capela	Brejo	
Capela	Pau d'Arco	
Capela	Cangaleixo	
Capela	Tapera	
Capela	Quem Dera	
Capela	Miranda	1174
Capela	Nova	253᠎᠎᠎᠎
Capela	Oiteiro	
Capela	Tapuiu	
Capela	Angás	
Capela	Pão de Açúcar	
Capela	Pedras	980
Capela	Pirangi	80
Capela	Pirunga	
Capela	Quixabá	276
Capela	Quixabinha	166᠎᠎᠎᠎
Capela	Saco Leitão	
Capela	São José	334
Capela	São Cristóvão	500
Capela	Sambaíba	
Capela	Santa Clara	647
Capela	Saúde	670᠎᠎᠎᠎
Capela	Tabuleiro	237
Capela	Terra Dura	684
Siriri	Lagoa Grande	764
Siriri	Castanhal	499
Siriri	Fazendinha	367
Siriri	Itaperoá	
Siriri	Siririzinho	588
Siriri	Mata do Cipó	264
Divina Pastora	Flor do Mucuri	1274
Divina Pastora	Maniçoba	702
Santa Rosa de Lima	Cana Brava	484
Santa Rosa de Lima	Lagoa do Carvão	143
Santa Rosa de Lima	Areias	567

=== Greater Aracaju ===
Municipality	Village	Population (2022)
Aracaju	Mosqueiro	4541
Aracaju	Areia Branca	4368᠎᠎
Aracaju	São José dos Náufragos	2928᠎᠎
Aracaju	Robalo	6028᠎᠎
Aracaju	Gameleira	935
Aracaju	Matapoã	2192᠎᠎
Barra dos Coqueiros	Atalaia Nova	2093᠎᠎
Barra dos Coqueiros	Cajueiro	᠎᠎
Barra dos Coqueiros	Canal São Sebastião	122᠎᠎
Barra dos Coqueiros	Capuá	᠎᠎
Barra dos Coqueiros	Grageru	187᠎᠎
Barra dos Coqueiros	Jatobá	1044
Barra dos Coqueiros	Pontal da Barra	530᠎᠎
Barra dos Coqueiros	Portal dos Ventos	᠎᠎
Barra dos Coqueiros	Praia do Porto	᠎᠎
Barra dos Coqueiros	Touro	271᠎᠎
Santo Amaro das Brotas	Aldeia	506
Santo Amaro das Brotas	Angelim	291᠎᠎
Santo Amaro das Brotas	Areias	᠎᠎
Santo Amaro das Brotas	Aruari	᠎᠎
Santo Amaro das Brotas	Barreirinha	᠎᠎
Santo Amaro das Brotas	Boa Fé	᠎᠎
Santo Amaro das Brotas	Boticário	᠎᠎
Santo Amaro das Brotas	Curral do Meio	᠎᠎
Santo Amaro das Brotas	Flexeiras	371᠎᠎
Santo Amaro das Brotas	Gravatá	᠎᠎
Santo Amaro das Brotas	Hugo Heredia	94᠎᠎
Santo Amaro das Brotas	Palmar	᠎᠎
Santo Amaro das Brotas	Palmeiras	᠎᠎
Santo Amaro das Brotas	Plantas	᠎᠎
Santo Amaro das Brotas	Pronúncia	᠎᠎
Santo Amaro das Brotas	Recanto dos Papagaios	265᠎᠎
Santo Amaro das Brotas	Sapé	265᠎᠎
Santo Amaro das Brotas	Urubas	᠎᠎
Maruim	Caititu	166᠎᠎
Maruim	Gentil	122᠎᠎
Maruim	Guiomar Dias	104᠎᠎
Maruim	Mata de São José	448᠎᠎
Maruim	Oiteiros	233᠎᠎
Maruim	Pau Ferro	1442᠎᠎
Maruim	Pedra Branca	394᠎᠎
Maruim	Pedras	᠎᠎
Riachuelo	Bela Vista	254᠎᠎
Riachuelo	Central	265᠎᠎
Riachuelo	Santa Maria	᠎᠎
Laranjeiras	Boa Sorte	᠎᠎
Laranjeiras	Bom Jesus	1086᠎᠎
Laranjeiras	Cedro	221᠎᠎
Laranjeiras	Gameleiro	604᠎᠎
Laranjeiras	Mussuca	2147᠎᠎
Laranjeiras	Pastora	1216᠎᠎
Laranjeiras	Pedra Branca	2927᠎᠎
Laranjeiras	Várzea	229᠎᠎
Laranjeiras	São José do Pinheiro	113
Laranjeiras	Bumburum	358
Nossa Senhora do Socorro	Taiçoca de Fora	5028᠎᠎
Nossa Senhora do Socorro	Taiçoca de Dentro	1188᠎᠎
Nossa Senhora do Socorro	Lazareto	381᠎᠎
Nossa Senhora do Socorro	Calumbi	69᠎᠎
Nossa Senhora do Socorro	Porto Grande	1034᠎᠎
Nossa Senhora do Socorro	Boa Nova	232᠎᠎
Nossa Senhora do Socorro	Taboca	902᠎᠎
Nossa Senhora do Socorro	Oiteiros	640᠎᠎
Nossa Senhora do Socorro	Quissimã	155᠎᠎
Nossa Senhora do Socorro	Bita	210᠎᠎
Nossa Senhora do Socorro	Lavandeira	432᠎᠎
Nossa Senhora do Socorro	Camaratuba	260᠎᠎
Nossa Senhora do Socorro	São Brás	250᠎᠎
São Cristóvão	Ilha Grande	᠎
São Cristóvão	Pedreiras	499᠎᠎
São Cristóvão	Mal Acabado	᠎᠎
São Cristóvão	Purga	᠎᠎
São Cristóvão	Tinharé	277᠎᠎
São Cristóvão	Caípe Velho	᠎
São Cristóvão	Bom Jardim	84
São Cristóvão	Caípe Novo	᠎᠎
São Cristóvão	Candeal	᠎᠎
São Cristóvão	Terra Nova	᠎᠎
São Cristóvão	Camboatá	᠎᠎
São Cristóvão	Caritá	᠎
São Cristóvão	Cabrita	579᠎᠎
São Cristóvão	Cajueiro	131
São Cristóvão	Cantinho do Céu	430᠎᠎
São Cristóvão	Várzea Grande	357᠎᠎
São Cristóvão	Umbaúba	᠎᠎
São Cristóvão	Colônia Miranda	᠎
São Cristóvão	Coqueiro	᠎᠎
São Cristóvão	Country Club	160
São Cristóvão	Rita Cacete	903᠎᠎
São Cristóvão	Arame	382᠎᠎
São Cristóvão	Brasília	᠎᠎
São Cristóvão	Florestan Fernandes	173᠎
São Cristóvão	Alto da Cascalheira	᠎᠎
São Cristóvão	Cajueiro Grande	᠎᠎
São Cristóvão	Jurubeba	᠎᠎
São Cristóvão	Aldeia	᠎᠎
São Cristóvão	Santa Rita	748᠎
São Cristóvão	Aningas	᠎᠎
São Cristóvão	Emília Maria	37᠎᠎
São Cristóvão	Várzea Verde	᠎᠎
São Cristóvão	Recreio dos Passarinhos	413᠎᠎
São Cristóvão	Timbó	188᠎
São Cristóvão	Ingazeira	58᠎᠎
São Cristóvão	Nova Descoberta	᠎᠎
São Cristóvão	Cardoso	794᠎᠎
São Cristóvão	Rosa Luxemburgo	᠎᠎
São Cristóvão	Curralinho	174᠎
Itaporanga d'Ajuda	Água Boa	170᠎᠎
Itaporanga d'Ajuda	Água Bonita	᠎᠎
Itaporanga d'Ajuda	Alto da Coruja	151᠎᠎
Itaporanga d'Ajuda	Araticum	253᠎᠎
Itaporanga d'Ajuda	Bom Jesus	᠎᠎
Itaporanga d'Ajuda	Cai Duro	᠎᠎
Itaporanga d'Ajuda	Calumbi	᠎᠎
Itaporanga d'Ajuda	Camaçari Mirim	422᠎᠎
Itaporanga d'Ajuda	Campos	519᠎᠎
Itaporanga d'Ajuda	Cardoso	᠎᠎
Itaporanga d'Ajuda	Caueira	1108᠎᠎
Itaporanga d'Ajuda	Chã	536᠎᠎
Itaporanga d'Ajuda	Chinduba	
Itaporanga d'Ajuda	Chindubinha	᠎᠎
Itaporanga d'Ajuda	Costa do Pau d'Arco	472᠎᠎
Itaporanga d'Ajuda	Curralinho	223᠎᠎
Itaporanga d'Ajuda	Darcy Ribeiro	᠎᠎
Itaporanga d'Ajuda	Dom Helder	᠎᠎
Itaporanga d'Ajuda	Dorcelina Folador	288᠎᠎
Itaporanga d'Ajuda	Duro	873᠎᠎
Itaporanga d'Ajuda	Gravatá	939᠎᠎
Itaporanga d'Ajuda	Ipanema	213᠎᠎
Itaporanga d'Ajuda	Iraque	465᠎᠎
Itaporanga d'Ajuda	Lagoa Redonda	᠎᠎
Itaporanga d'Ajuda	Língua de Vaca	᠎᠎
Itaporanga d'Ajuda	Mangabeira	᠎᠎
Itaporanga d'Ajuda	Mata do Ipanema	354᠎᠎
Itaporanga d'Ajuda	Mem de Sá	190᠎᠎
Itaporanga d'Ajuda	Moita Formosa	᠎᠎
Itaporanga d'Ajuda	Morena	᠎᠎
Itaporanga d'Ajuda	Minante	148᠎᠎
Itaporanga d'Ajuda	Nova Descoberta	3389᠎᠎
Itaporanga d'Ajuda	Padre Josimo Tavares	᠎᠎
Itaporanga d'Ajuda	Paruí	163᠎᠎
Itaporanga d'Ajuda	Pau Pombo	᠎᠎
Itaporanga d'Ajuda	Quebradas	᠎᠎
Itaporanga d'Ajuda	Riachinho	᠎᠎
Itaporanga d'Ajuda	Rio Fundo da Cachoeira	᠎᠎
Itaporanga d'Ajuda	Rio Fundo do Arame	᠎᠎
Itaporanga d'Ajuda	Rio Fundo do Félix	145᠎᠎
Itaporanga d'Ajuda	Saco	᠎᠎
Itaporanga d'Ajuda	Salvador	218᠎᠎
Itaporanga d'Ajuda	Salvadorzinho	286᠎᠎
Itaporanga d'Ajuda	Sapé	2100᠎᠎
Itaporanga d'Ajuda	Taboca	᠎᠎
Itaporanga d'Ajuda	Tapera	445᠎᠎
Itaporanga d'Ajuda	Tapera de Baixo	᠎᠎
Itaporanga d'Ajuda	Tejupeba	196᠎᠎
Itaporanga d'Ajuda	Telha	130᠎᠎
Itaporanga d'Ajuda	Timbó	᠎᠎
Itaporanga d'Ajuda	Tinga	᠎᠎
Itaporanga d'Ajuda	Várzea Grande	176᠎᠎

=== South Microregion ===
Municipality	Village	Population (2022)
Arauá	Bandeira	307᠎᠎
Arauá	Camboatá	᠎᠎
Arauá	Casa Caiada	780᠎᠎
Arauá	Carnaíba	215
Arauá	Deus Proverá	᠎᠎
Arauá	Lagoa de Dentro	᠎᠎
Arauá	Poços	206᠎᠎
Arauá	Progresso	1096᠎᠎
Arauá	Sucupira	636᠎᠎
Arauá	Tabuleiro	287᠎᠎
Arauá	Limoeiro	264᠎᠎
Arauá	Eugênia	139᠎᠎
Estância	Abaís	273᠎᠎
Estância	Alecrim	3197᠎᠎
Estância	Águia Branca	᠎᠎
Estância	Araças	᠎᠎
Estância	Analício de Araújo Borges	᠎᠎
Estância	Dom Helder Câmara	᠎᠎
Estância	Boa Viagem	249᠎᠎
Estância	Bode	᠎᠎
Estância	Biriba	60
Estância	Barro	᠎᠎
Estância	Cabeça de Boi	᠎᠎
Estância	Caio Prado	236᠎᠎
Estância	Calumbi	᠎᠎
Estância	Candeal	485᠎᠎
Estância	Colônia Bela Vista	᠎᠎
Estância	Colônia do Teté	᠎᠎
Estância	Colônia Entre Rios	803᠎᠎
Estância	Colônia Estancinha	325᠎᠎
Estância	Colônia São José	159᠎᠎
Estância	Colônia Vertente	119᠎᠎
Estância	Coqueiro	᠎᠎
Estância	Cupim	᠎᠎
Estância	Curimã	᠎᠎
Estância	Curuanha	138᠎᠎
Estância	Dezessete de Abril	᠎᠎
Estância	Dizilena	᠎᠎
Estância	Estancinha	339᠎᠎
Estância	Farnafal	176᠎᠎
Estância	Fonte Nova	᠎᠎
Estância	Gravatá	᠎᠎
Estância	Grotão	᠎᠎
Estância	José Eduardo	᠎᠎
Estância	Junco	᠎᠎
Estância	Lamarão	᠎᠎
Estância	Nova Estância	᠎᠎
Estância	Manoel Dias	᠎᠎
Estância	Manoel Ferreira	᠎᠎
Estância	Massadiço	᠎᠎
Estância	Mato Grosso	᠎᠎
Estância	Miranga	᠎᠎
Estância	Miranguinha	᠎᠎
Estância	Moinho	᠎᠎
Estância	Muculanduba	᠎᠎
Estância	Ouricuri	᠎᠎
Estância	Palmeirinha	᠎᠎
Estância	Paulo Freire	᠎᠎
Estância	Pastinho	᠎᠎
Estância	Porto do Mato	1106᠎᠎
Estância	Queimadas	᠎᠎
Estância	Riachão	᠎᠎
Estância	Ribeiro	᠎᠎
Estância	Ribuleirinha	᠎᠎
Estância	Rio Fundo	531᠎᠎
Estância	Rosa Luxemburgo	᠎᠎
Estância	Roseli Nunes	᠎᠎
Estância	Saco do Raiz	᠎᠎
Estância	Saco do Barbosa	᠎᠎
Estância	Saco do Rio Real	102᠎᠎
Estância	Sacovão	᠎᠎
Estância	Sapucaia	᠎᠎
Estância	Sete Casas	80᠎᠎
Estância	Taquari	᠎᠎
Estância	Tibúrcio	᠎᠎
Estância	Zeca de Loia	140
Salgado	Camboatá	158᠎᠎
Salgado	Arauary de Cima	᠎᠎
Salgado	Arauary de Baixo	᠎᠎
Salgado	Abóboras	᠎᠎
Salgado	Saco Encantado	498
Salgado	Quitéria	᠎᠎
Salgado	Abóboras de Cima	᠎᠎
Salgado	Cabral	᠎᠎
Salgado	Moendas	189᠎᠎
Salgado	Campo Verde	᠎᠎
Salgado	Macedina	᠎᠎
Salgado	Turma	᠎᠎
Salgado	Lagoão	᠎᠎
Salgado	Tombo	᠎᠎
Salgado	Tombo de Cima	579᠎᠎
Salgado	Matatas	444᠎᠎
Salgado	Carlos Torres	᠎᠎
Salgado	Quebradas	1269
Salgado	Bento de Baixo	240᠎᠎
Salgado	Bento de Cima	202᠎᠎
Salgado	Água Fria	2075᠎᠎
Boquim	Boa Vista do Fundunga	291᠎᠎
Boquim	Cabeça Dantas	1009᠎᠎
Boquim	Calitende	᠎᠎
Boquim	Jabuticaba de Baixo	᠎᠎
Boquim	Meia Légua	᠎᠎
Boquim	Miguel dos Anjos	1058᠎᠎
Boquim	Muriçoca	161᠎᠎
Boquim	Olhos d'Água	᠎᠎
Boquim	Pastor	᠎᠎
Boquim	Pimenteira	239᠎᠎
Boquim	Romão	᠎᠎
Boquim	Mangue Grande	332
Boquim	Varjão	᠎᠎
Pedrinhas	Mutumbo	449᠎᠎
Pedrinhas	João Pinto	᠎᠎
Pedrinhas	Limoeiro	᠎᠎
Santa Luzia do Itanhy	Pedra Furada	198᠎᠎
Santa Luzia do Itanhy	Rua da Palha	1354᠎᠎
Santa Luzia do Itanhy	Rio Castro	1554᠎᠎
Santa Luzia do Itanhy	Cajazeiras	286᠎᠎
Santa Luzia do Itanhy	Taboa de Baixo	᠎᠎
Santa Luzia do Itanhy	Vitória da União	᠎᠎
Santa Luzia do Itanhy	Priapu	418
Santa Luzia do Itanhy	Pau Torto	64᠎᠎
Santa Luzia do Itanhy	Santa Luzia	84
Santa Luzia do Itanhy	Botequim	401᠎᠎
Santa Luzia do Itanhy	Maria Cleonice Alves	208᠎᠎
Santa Luzia do Itanhy	Cambuí	341᠎᠎
Santa Luzia do Itanhy	Riacho do Marco	485᠎᠎
Santa Luzia do Itanhy	Murici	215᠎᠎
Santa Luzia do Itanhy	Feirinha	388᠎᠎
Santa Luzia do Itanhy	Areia Branca	311᠎᠎
Santa Luzia do Itanhy	Piçareira	354
Santa Luzia do Itanhy	Gonçala	᠎᠎
Santa Luzia do Itanhy	Bom Viver	᠎᠎
Indiaroba	Alto Alegre	139᠎᠎
Indiaroba	Bom Jesus	232᠎᠎
Indiaroba	Chico Mendes	123᠎᠎
Indiaroba	Cabatã	᠎᠎
Indiaroba	Cajueirinho	452᠎᠎
Indiaroba	Colônia Boa Vista	164᠎᠎
Indiaroba	Colônia Sergipe	1729᠎᠎
Indiaroba	Convento	312᠎᠎
Indiaroba	Pedra do Rumo	135᠎᠎
Indiaroba	Pontal	968᠎᠎
Indiaroba	Preguiça	658᠎᠎
Indiaroba	Retiro	417᠎᠎
Indiaroba	Roma	᠎᠎
Indiaroba	Saguim	553᠎᠎
Indiaroba	São Luís	᠎᠎
Indiaroba	Sete Brejos	318᠎᠎
Indiaroba	Terra Caída	763᠎᠎
Umbaúba	Pau Amarelo	356᠎᠎
Umbaúba	Mangabeira	239᠎᠎
Umbaúba	Matinha	358᠎᠎
Umbaúba	Tauá	801᠎᠎
Umbaúba	Dois Riachos	᠎᠎
Cristinápolis	Água Branca	241᠎᠎
Cristinápolis	Baixa Funda	᠎᠎
Cristinápolis	Cana Brava	᠎᠎
Cristinápolis	Colônia Cristinápolis	382᠎᠎
Cristinápolis	Lagoa do Engenho	᠎᠎
Cristinápolis	Lagoa Seca	284᠎
Cristinápolis	Nova Esperança	᠎᠎
Cristinápolis	Palmeira	᠎᠎
Cristinápolis	São Francisco	320᠎᠎
Cristinápolis	São Roque	᠎᠎
Cristinápolis	Taquari	᠎᠎
Cristinápolis	Vinte e Sete de Abril	᠎᠎
Cristinápolis	Zabelê	466᠎᠎
Itabaianinha	Alto	183᠎᠎
Itabaianinha	Barro Preto	᠎᠎
Itabaianinha	Borda da Mata	᠎᠎
Itabaianinha	Capim Grosso	᠎᠎
Itabaianinha	Campestre	᠎᠎
Itabaianinha	Campinhos	᠎᠎
Itabaianinha	Carrasco	᠎᠎
Itabaianinha	Coréia	᠎᠎
Itabaianinha	Curralinho	95᠎᠎
Itabaianinha	Diamante	320᠎᠎
Itabaianinha	Dispensa	886᠎᠎
Itabaianinha	Gameleira	᠎᠎
Itabaianinha	Ilha	1963᠎᠎
Itabaianinha	Jacinto	᠎᠎
Itabaianinha	Jardim	499᠎᠎
Itabaianinha	Maravilha	᠎᠎
Itabaianinha	Mombaça	158᠎᠎
Itabaianinha	Montavão	254᠎᠎
Itabaianinha	Muquém	᠎᠎
Itabaianinha	Patu	175᠎᠎
Itabaianinha	Pedra de Léguas	349᠎᠎
Itabaianinha	Poderosa	᠎᠎
Itabaianinha	Poxica	486᠎᠎
Itabaianinha	Riacho Seco	᠎᠎
Itabaianinha	Saco da Rainha	᠎᠎
Itabaianinha	Santa Rita	᠎᠎
Itabaianinha	Sapé	582᠎᠎
Itabaianinha	Tabela	᠎᠎
Itabaianinha	Travessão	329᠎᠎
Itabaianinha	Vermelho	᠎᠎
Tomar do Geru	Caraíba	᠎᠎
Tomar do Geru	Sete Grotas	᠎᠎
Tomar do Geru	Bastião	᠎᠎
Tomar do Geru	Serrote	᠎᠎
Tomar do Geru	Cascavel	᠎᠎
Tomar do Geru	Lopes	115᠎᠎
Tomar do Geru	Lagoa dos Sandes	᠎᠎
Tomar do Geru	Brejinho	287᠎᠎
Tomar do Geru	Carvão	᠎᠎
Tomar do Geru	Baía	᠎᠎
Tomar do Geru	Serra do Rio Real	152᠎᠎
Tomar do Geru	Sobrado	᠎᠎
Tomar do Geru	Campo Grande	339᠎᠎
Tomar do Geru	Jaqueira	᠎᠎
Tomar do Geru	Boqueirão	᠎᠎
Tomar do Geru	Negrinha	᠎᠎
Tomar do Geru	Terra Vermelha	᠎᠎
Tomar do Geru	Tabuleiro	᠎᠎
Tomar do Geru	Cardoso	349᠎᠎
Tomar do Geru	Olaria	᠎᠎
Tomar do Geru	Cachimbeiro	᠎᠎

=== Lower São Francisco Microregion ===
Municipality	Village	Population (2022)
Amparo de São Francisco	Crioulo	᠎᠎
Amparo de São Francisco	Lagoa Seca	241᠎᠎
Amparo de São Francisco	Lagoa dos Campinhos	
Amparo de São Francisco	Pontal	74᠎᠎
Amparo de São Francisco	Serraria	᠎᠎
Canhoba	Borda da Mata	635᠎᠎
Canhoba	Caraíbas	672᠎᠎
Canhoba	Cinzeiro	᠎᠎
Canhoba	Coitezera	᠎᠎
Canhoba	Gravatá	᠎᠎
Canhoba	Poçãozinha	172᠎᠎
Canhoba	Sítios Novos	99᠎᠎
Telha	Bela Vista	657᠎᠎
Telha	São Tiago	97᠎᠎
Telha	São Pedro	1039᠎᠎
Telha	Adutora	᠎᠎
Cedro de São João	Bananeiras	᠎᠎
Cedro de São João	Lagoa Nova	᠎᠎
Cedro de São João	Poço dos Bois	374᠎᠎
Propriá	Alemanha	150᠎᠎
Propriá	São Miguel	1098᠎᠎
Propriá	Pau das Marrecas	᠎᠎
Propriá	Boa Esperança	262᠎᠎
Propriá	Santa Cruz	503᠎᠎
Propriá	São Vicente	727᠎᠎
Propriá	Padre Cícero	260᠎᠎
Propriá	Vrejo dos Cajueiros	᠎᠎
Propriá	Pedra do Cágado	᠎᠎
Propriá	São Antônio	᠎᠎
Propriá	Lagamar	᠎᠎
Malhada dos Bois	Cruz da Donzela	1662᠎᠎
Malhada dos Bois	Moita	᠎᠎
Malhada dos Bois	Lagoinhas	᠎᠎
Malhada dos Bois	Taboca	185᠎᠎
Malhada dos Bois	Arranhento	᠎᠎
Muribeca	Visgueiro	1091᠎᠎
Muribeca	Pedras	579᠎᠎
Muribeca	Pau Alto	406᠎᠎
Muribeca	Camará	117
Muribeca	Cigana	93᠎᠎
Muribeca	Cabeça de Onça	᠎᠎
Muribeca	Fluvião	344᠎᠎
Muribeca	Saco das Varas	645᠎᠎
Muribeca	Arrodeador	491᠎᠎
Muribeca	Cajueiro	᠎᠎
São Francisco	Nascença	199᠎᠎
São Francisco	Terra Vermelha	᠎᠎
São Francisco	Manoel Dionísio	133᠎᠎
São Francisco	Lages	᠎᠎
São Francisco	Pau de Canoa	᠎᠎
São Francisco	Maria Ermita	᠎᠎
São Francisco	Rocinha	᠎᠎
Santana do São Francisco	Saúde	2232᠎᠎
Santana do São Francisco	Várzea do Valentim	᠎᠎
Santana do São Francisco	Brejo da Conceição	312᠎᠎
Neópolis	Poções	᠎᠎
Neópolis	Fazendinha	224᠎᠎
Neópolis	Tapera	294᠎᠎
Neópolis	Tiririca	᠎᠎
Neópolis	Betume	777᠎᠎
Neópolis	Mata dos Varas	᠎᠎
Neópolis	Flor do Brejo	281᠎᠎
Neópolis	Mundeu da Onça	497᠎᠎
Neópolis	Alto Santo Antônio	᠎᠎
Neópolis	Primeiro de Maio	᠎᠎
Neópolis	Águas Vermelhas	145᠎᠎
Neópolis	Porteiras	᠎᠎
Neópolis	Santa Maria	᠎᠎
Neópolis	Novo Horizonte	301᠎᠎
Neópolis	Pindoba	1088᠎᠎
Neópolis	Soldeiro	179
Neópolis	Tenório	395᠎᠎
Neópolis	Mussuípe	946᠎᠎
Neópolis	Maria Zende dos Santos	᠎᠎
Neópolis	Cacimbas	398᠎᠎
Japoatã	Aroeiras	᠎᠎
Japoatã	Currais	᠎᠎
Japoatã	Espinheiro	874᠎᠎
Japoatã	Estiva dos Paus	125᠎᠎
Japoatã	Ladeiras	966᠎᠎
Japoatã	Ladeirinhas	1312᠎᠎
Japoatã	Malhadas	᠎᠎
Japoatã	Margarida Alves	193᠎᠎
Japoatã	Massaranduba	᠎᠎
Japoatã	Usina Santana	64
Japoatã	Piauí de Baixo	᠎᠎
Japoatã	Pinga	᠎᠎
Japoatã	Pororoca	᠎᠎
Japoatã	Poxim	956᠎᠎
Japoatã	Tapera	᠎᠎
Japoatã	Tatu	1935᠎᠎
Japoatã	Três Canelas	᠎᠎
Pacatuba	Garatuba	᠎᠎
Pacatuba	Oitizeiro	᠎᠎
Pacatuba	Aracaré	183᠎᠎
Pacatuba	Ponta dos Mangues	602᠎᠎
Pacatuba	Carapitanga	᠎᠎
Pacatuba	Boca da Barra	254᠎᠎
Pacatuba	Piranhas	᠎᠎
Pacatuba	Tijupares	᠎᠎
Pacatuba	Junça	᠎᠎
Pacatuba	Tigre	᠎᠎
Pacatuba	Serigy	᠎᠎
Pacatuba	Padre Nestor	᠎᠎
Pacatuba	Ouricuri	᠎᠎
Pacatuba	Lagoa das Flores	᠎᠎
Pacatuba	Atalho	᠎᠎
Pacatuba	Paturi	᠎᠎
Pacatuba	Lagoinha	᠎᠎
Pacatuba	Brejão da Itioca	᠎᠎
Pacatuba	Timbó	294᠎᠎
Pacatuba	Campinas	220
Pacatuba	Fazenda Nova	397᠎᠎
Pacatuba	Aragão	112᠎᠎
Pacatuba	Cruiri	287᠎᠎
Pacatuba	Geme	403
Pacatuba	Santana dos Frades	᠎᠎
Pacatuba	Santaninha	᠎᠎
Pacatuba	Nossa Senhora Santana	287᠎᠎
Pacatuba	Nossa Senhora do Carmo	200᠎᠎
Pacatuba	Golfo	146᠎᠎
Pacatuba	Lagoa Grande	198᠎᠎
Pacatuba	Areia Branca	370᠎᠎
Pacatuba	Mororó	641᠎᠎
Pacatuba	Cobra d´Água	254᠎᠎
Pacatuba	Gravatá	᠎᠎
Pacatuba	Tabuleiro do Garcia	᠎᠎
Pacatuba	Rancho	414᠎᠎
Pacatuba	Prata	᠎᠎
Pacatuba	Estiva do Raposo	813᠎᠎
Pacatuba	Siqueira	219᠎᠎
Pacatuba	Ponta de Areia	643᠎᠎
Brejo Grande	Barro Quebrado	152᠎᠎
Brejo Grande	Brejão	1838᠎᠎
Brejo Grande	Carapitanga	260᠎᠎
Brejo Grande	Mulatas	᠎᠎
Brejo Grande	Oitizeiro	211᠎᠎
Brejo Grande	Prainha	᠎᠎
Brejo Grande	Praúna	86
Brejo Grande	Resina	105᠎᠎
Brejo Grande	Santa Cruz	180᠎᠎
Brejo Grande	Saramem	763᠎᠎
Brejo Grande	Terra Vermelha	᠎᠎
Ilha das Flores	Aroeiras	430᠎᠎
Ilha das Flores	Bongue	᠎᠎
Ilha das Flores	Jenipapo	᠎᠎
Ilha das Flores	Serrão	2110᠎᠎

== Sertão Sergipano ==
=== Upper Sertão Microregion ===
Municipality	Village	Population (2022)
Nossa Senhora de Lourdes	Barro Vermelho	᠎᠎
Nossa Senhora de Lourdes	Lagoas	105᠎᠎
Nossa Senhora de Lourdes	Catingueira	119᠎᠎
Nossa Senhora de Lourdes	Areias	᠎᠎
Nossa Senhora de Lourdes	Escurial	977᠎᠎
Nossa Senhora de Lourdes	Carro Quebrado	238
Nossa Senhora de Lourdes	Lago do Monte	᠎᠎
Gararu	Flor da índia	᠎᠎
Gararu	Josenilton Alves	
Gararu	Maria Vitória	᠎᠎
Gararu	Boa Hora	᠎᠎
Gararu	Cabaceiro	᠎᠎
Gararu	Couro Seco	᠎᠎
Gararu	Mangeroma	126
Gararu	Genipatuba	230
Gararu	Pias	
Gararu	Palestina	286
Gararu	São Mateus da Palestina	662
Gararu	Bela Vista	
Gararu	Aldeia	
Gararu	Jaramataia	
Gararu	Barriguda	
Gararu	Ouricurizeira	
Gararu	Campinhos	
Gararu	Azedem	
Gararu	Várzea Nova	
Gararu	Braúnas	
Gararu	Golfinhos	
Gararu	Cabeça do Boi	
Gararu	Lagoa do Tupi	
Gararu	Cachoeirinha	144
Gararu	São José	
Gararu	Valda Aragão	
Gararu	Ouricuri	
Gararu	Lagoa Rosa	106
Gararu	Gitirana	᠎᠎
Gararu	Lagoa Funda	238
Gararu	Jibóia	᠎᠎
Gararu	Lagoa dos Intãs	᠎᠎
Gararu	Lagoa do Porco	258᠎᠎
Gararu	Lagoa Primeira	447
Gararu	Monte Santo	108᠎᠎
Gararu	Oiteiro	598᠎᠎
Gararu	Querereu	᠎᠎
Gararu	Tanque de Pedra	᠎᠎
Porto da Folha	Vaca Serrada	197᠎᠎
Porto da Folha	Lagoa Redonda	1825᠎᠎
Porto da Folha	Marrecas	᠎᠎
Porto da Folha	Fidel Castro	᠎᠎
Porto da Folha	Paulo Freire	169᠎᠎
Porto da Folha	Ranchinho	198᠎᠎
Porto da Folha	São Francisco	᠎᠎
Porto da Folha	Niterói	415᠎᠎
Porto da Folha	Pedro Leão	᠎᠎
Porto da Folha	Linda França	1034᠎᠎
Porto da Folha	Saco da Serra	᠎᠎
Porto da Folha	Estado	᠎᠎
Porto da Folha	Lagoa da Volta	2364᠎᠎
Porto da Folha	Jureminha	᠎᠎
Porto da Folha	Esperança	᠎᠎
Porto da Folha	Serra do Tabaco	᠎᠎
Porto da Folha	Mocambo	451᠎᠎
Porto da Folha	Catuné	᠎᠎
Porto da Folha	Lagoa do Rancho	1109᠎᠎
Porto da Folha	Senhor do Bonfim	᠎᠎
Porto da Folha	Lajerinho	᠎᠎
Porto da Folha	Umbuzeiro do Matuto	242
Porto da Folha	Pedra da Ema	᠎᠎
Porto da Folha	Goiabeira	᠎᠎
Porto da Folha	São Domingos	᠎᠎
Porto da Folha	Craibeiro	᠎᠎
Porto da Folha	São Judas Tadeu	᠎᠎
Porto da Folha	Girassol	᠎᠎
Porto da Folha	Maria de Conceição Menezes	118᠎᠎
Porto da Folha	Ilha de Ouro	531᠎᠎
Porto da Folha	Lagoa Salgada	771᠎᠎
Porto da Folha	Malhada Comprida	᠎᠎
Porto da Folha	Flamengo	᠎᠎
Porto da Folha	José Unaldo de Oliveira	᠎᠎
Porto da Folha	Lagoa do Mato	246᠎᠎
Porto da Folha	Ilha de São Pedro	321᠎᠎
Porto da Folha	Araticum	᠎᠎
Porto da Folha	Vila Nova	᠎᠎
Nossa Senhora da Glória	Baixa Limpa	᠎᠎
Nossa Senhora da Glória	Gameleiro	᠎᠎
Nossa Senhora da Glória	Angicos	396᠎᠎
Nossa Senhora da Glória	Melancia	᠎᠎
Nossa Senhora da Glória	Lagoa Bonita	᠎᠎
Nossa Senhora da Glória	Nossa Senhora da Boa Hora	᠎᠎
Nossa Senhora da Glória	Lagoa do Rancho	᠎᠎
Nossa Senhora da Glória	Alto Bonito	496᠎᠎
Nossa Senhora da Glória	Nova Esperança	93᠎᠎
Nossa Senhora da Glória	Campo do Dnoc	᠎᠎
Nossa Senhora da Glória	João do Vale	᠎᠎
Nossa Senhora da Glória	Ribeiro Aragão	96
Nossa Senhora da Glória	Mocambo	᠎᠎
Nossa Senhora da Glória	Boa Vista	᠎᠎
Nossa Senhora da Glória	Canaã	158
Nossa Senhora da Glória	Nossa Senhora Aparecida	᠎᠎
Nossa Senhora da Glória	Luiz Beltrano	᠎᠎
Nossa Senhora da Glória	Antônio Alves Feitosa	159᠎᠎
Nossa Senhora da Glória	Nova Vida	᠎᠎
Nossa Senhora da Glória	Aningás	᠎᠎
Nossa Senhora da Glória	Fortaleza	105᠎᠎
Nossa Senhora da Glória	Nossa Senhora de Lourdes	156᠎᠎
Nossa Senhora da Glória	São Clemente	512᠎᠎
Nossa Senhora da Glória	Piabas	᠎᠎
Nossa Senhora da Glória	Aracuã	᠎᠎
Nossa Senhora da Glória	Queimada da Onça	278᠎᠎
Nossa Senhora da Glória	Tanque Novo	᠎᠎
Nossa Senhora da Glória	Quixaba	᠎᠎
Nossa Senhora da Glória	José Emídio	᠎᠎
Nossa Senhora da Glória	Lagoa do Chocalho	᠎᠎
Nossa Senhora da Glória	Nossa Senhora da Conceição	122
Nossa Senhora da Glória	Lagoa da Ovelha	᠎᠎
Nossa Senhora da Glória	Riacho do Chico	᠎᠎
Nossa Senhora da Glória	São Vicente	᠎᠎
Nossa Senhora da Glória	Poço Verde	᠎᠎
Nossa Senhora da Glória	Tanque de Pedra	᠎᠎
Nossa Senhora da Glória	Morro do Pato	᠎᠎
Nossa Senhora da Glória	José Ribamar	᠎᠎
Monte Alegre de Sergipe	Taxas	᠎᠎
Monte Alegre de Sergipe	Baixa Verde	᠎᠎
Monte Alegre de Sergipe	Baixa da Coxa	154
Monte Alegre de Sergipe	Lagoa do Roçado	166᠎᠎
Monte Alegre de Sergipe	Belo Monte	᠎᠎
Monte Alegre de Sergipe	Bom Jardim	᠎᠎
Monte Alegre de Sergipe	Lagoa da Entrada	᠎᠎
Monte Alegre de Sergipe	Trevo	217᠎᠎
Monte Alegre de Sergipe	Tabuleio	᠎᠎
Monte Alegre de Sergipe	Bom Nome	᠎᠎
Monte Alegre de Sergipe	Paulo Freire	᠎᠎
Monte Alegre de Sergipe	Poço do Boi	᠎᠎
Monte Alegre de Sergipe	Cajueiro	᠎᠎
Monte Alegre de Sergipe	Monte Alegre Velho	᠎᠎
Monte Alegre de Sergipe	Nossa Senhora Aparecida	182
Monte Alegre de Sergipe	Nova Alegria	᠎᠎
Monte Alegre de Sergipe	Uruçu	᠎᠎
Monte Alegre de Sergipe	Primeiro de Maio	᠎᠎
Monte Alegre de Sergipe	Lagoa da Espora	᠎᠎
Monte Alegre de Sergipe	Monte Santo	᠎᠎
Monte Alegre de Sergipe	Lagoa das Areias	᠎᠎
Monte Alegre de Sergipe	Barra nova	᠎᠎
Monte Alegre de Sergipe	Couro	᠎᠎
Monte Alegre de Sergipe	Maravilha	145᠎᠎
Poço Redondo	Sítios Novos	2393᠎᠎
Poço Redondo	Barraca dos Negros	᠎᠎
Poço Redondo	Pato Branco	᠎᠎
Poço Redondo	Patos	᠎᠎
Poço Redondo	Bonsucesso	597᠎᠎
Poço Redondo	Umbuzeiro do Matuto	70᠎᠎
Poço Redondo	Che Guevara	᠎᠎
Poço Redondo	Cajueiro	473᠎᠎
Poço Redondo	Cajueiros no São Francisco	43
Poço Redondo	Curralinho Velho	᠎᠎
Poço Redondo	Padre Cícero	᠎᠎
Poço Redondo	Lagoa das Areias	᠎᠎
Poço Redondo	São Lucas	᠎᠎
Poço Redondo	Grupo Escolhido	᠎᠎
Poço Redondo	Unidos Venceremos	102
Poço Redondo	Frei Damião	᠎᠎
Poço Redondo	Lagoa Grande	᠎᠎
Poço Redondo	São Sebastião	258
Poço Redondo	Curralinho	270᠎᠎
Poço Redondo	Carlito Maia	᠎᠎
Poço Redondo	Djalma Cesário	᠎᠎
Poço Redondo	Nelson Mandela	᠎᠎
Poço Redondo	Pioneira	᠎᠎
Poço Redondo	Novo Mulungu	᠎᠎
Poço Redondo	Emanuel	᠎᠎
Poço Redondo	Zumbi dos Palmares	᠎᠎
Poço Redondo	Nova Esperança	124᠎᠎
Poço Redondo	União	᠎᠎
Poço Redondo	Santa Cruz	᠎᠎
Poço Redondo	Jardim da Esperança	᠎᠎
Poço Redondo	São Cosme	᠎᠎
Poço Redondo	Doze de Março	᠎᠎
Poço Redondo	Canudos	᠎᠎
Poço Redondo	Menino Jesus	᠎᠎
Poço Redondo	Santa Terezinha	᠎᠎
Poço Redondo	Nossa Senhora Aparecida	᠎᠎
Poço Redondo	Pereira	᠎᠎
Poço Redondo	Santa Luzia	᠎᠎
Poço Redondo	Marsal de Souza	᠎᠎
Poço Redondo	São Jorge	252᠎᠎
Poço Redondo	José Rainha	148᠎᠎
Poço Redondo	Jacaré Curituba	194᠎᠎
Poço Redondo	São José	᠎᠎
Poço Redondo	Cajueiro	᠎᠎
Poço Redondo	Jacaré	᠎᠎
Poço Redondo	Santa Rosa do Ermírio	2905᠎᠎
Poço Redondo	Pedras Grandes	160᠎᠎
Poço Redondo	Lagoa Grande	᠎᠎
Poço Redondo	Lagoa dos Bichos	᠎᠎
Poço Redondo	Salitrado	᠎᠎
Poço Redondo	Barro Grosso	᠎᠎
Poço Redondo	Canadá	252᠎᠎
Poço Redondo	Areias	᠎᠎
Poço Redondo	Emendadas	᠎᠎
Poço Redondo	Maria Bonita	᠎᠎
Poço Redondo	Josué de Castro	᠎᠎
Poço Redondo	José Acássio	᠎᠎
Poço Redondo	João Pedro Teixeira	᠎᠎
Poço Redondo	Nova Vida	᠎᠎
Poço Redondo	Maria Feitosa	᠎᠎
Poço Redondo	Nossa Senhora da Conceição	᠎᠎
Poço Redondo	Alto Bonito	᠎᠎
Poço Redondo	Braço Erguido	132᠎᠎
Poço Redondo	Nove de Julho	᠎᠎
Poço Redondo	Maranduba	᠎᠎
Poço Redondo	Karl Marx	᠎᠎
Poço Redondo	Queimada Grande	917᠎᠎
Poço Redondo	Queimadas	᠎᠎
Poço Redondo	Flor da Serra	148᠎᠎
Poço Redondo	Paraíso	᠎᠎
Poço Redondo	Lagoa do Riacho Salgado	116᠎᠎
Poço Redondo	Pé de Serra	᠎᠎
Poço Redondo	Guia	300᠎᠎
Poço Redondo	Lagoa do Boi	᠎᠎
Poço Redondo	Marroquinhos	᠎᠎
Poço Redondo	Mateus	᠎᠎
Canindé de São Francisco	Modelo	180᠎᠎
Canindé de São Francisco	Badia	᠎᠎
Canindé de São Francisco	Beira Rio	293᠎᠎
Canindé de São Francisco	Capim Grosso	2034᠎᠎
Canindé de São Francisco	Colônia Santa Rita	᠎᠎
Canindé de São Francisco	Colônia Sebastião Enéas	᠎᠎
Canindé de São Francisco	Cuiabá	1307᠎᠎
Canindé de São Francisco	Curituba	1223᠎᠎
Canindé de São Francisco	Eldorado	᠎᠎
Canindé de São Francisco	Eldorado dos Carajás	᠎᠎
Canindé de São Francisco	Florestan Fernandes	᠎᠎
Canindé de São Francisco	Lagoa das Areias	᠎᠎
Canindé de São Francisco	Lagoa do Frio	᠎᠎
Canindé de São Francisco	Mandacaru	375᠎᠎
Canindé de São Francisco	Marruá	᠎᠎
Canindé de São Francisco	Monte Santo	᠎᠎
Canindé de São Francisco	Nossa Senhora Aparecida	᠎᠎
Canindé de São Francisco	Nossa Senhora de Fátima	᠎᠎
Canindé de São Francisco	Nova Vida	᠎᠎
Canindé de São Francisco	Pedra d'Água	᠎᠎
Canindé de São Francisco	Pedra dos Negros	96᠎᠎
Canindé de São Francisco	Pedra Nega	᠎᠎
Canindé de São Francisco	Pedra Preta	᠎᠎
Canindé de São Francisco	Pelado	᠎᠎
Canindé de São Francisco	Santa Maria	᠎᠎
Canindé de São Francisco	Santa Rosa	᠎᠎
Canindé de São Francisco	Santa Terezinha	᠎᠎
Canindé de São Francisco	Serra Azul	᠎᠎
Canindé de São Francisco	União Bom Jesus	᠎᠎
Canindé de São Francisco	Valmir Mota Keno	᠎᠎

== See also ==
- Sergipe
- List of municipalities in Sergipe
- Quilombos
