= Fazendinha (Carira) =

- Village
- Location of Carira in Sergipe

- Location within Brazil
- Coordinates: 10°20′51″S 37°40′15″W
- Country: Brazil
- State: Sergipe
- Municipality: Carira
- Elevation: 247 m (810 ft)
- Population (2022): 291

Fazendinha (Brazilian Portuguese pronunciation: [fazẽˈdj̃ɐ]) is a village in the municipality of Carira, state of Sergipe, in northeastern Brazil. As of 2022 it had a population of 291. In Portuguese "fazendinha" means "little farm".

== See also ==
- List of villages in Sergipe
