= Divisa (Carira) =

- Village
- Location of Carira in Sergipe

- Location within Brazil
- Coordinates: 10°19′3″S 37°44′27″W
- Country: Brazil
- State: Sergipe
- Municipality: Carira
- Elevation: 390 m (1,280 ft)
- Population (2022): 193

Divisa (Brazilian Portuguese pronunciation: [diˈvizɐ or diˈɦizɐ]) is a village in the municipality of Carira, state of Sergipe, in northeastern Brazil. As of 2022 it had a population of 193. In Portuguese "divisa" means "border".

== See also ==
- List of villages in Sergipe
