= Areias, Areia Branca =

Areias
- Village
- Location of Areia Branca in Sergipe

- Location within Brazil
- Coordinates: 10°46′26″S 37°22′1″W
- Country: Brazil
- State: Sergipe
- Municipality: Areia Branca
- Elevation: 219 m (719 ft)
- Population (2022): 562

Areias (Portuguese pronunciation: [ɐˈɾeɐz]) is a village in the municipality of Areia Branca, state of Sergipe, in northeastern Brazil. As of 2022 it had a population of 562. In Portuguese "areias" means "sands".

== See also ==
- List of villages in Sergipe
