= Manilha de Baixo =

- Village
- Location of Areia Branca in Sergipe

- Location within Brazil
- Coordinates: 10°46′19″S 37°17′13″W
- Country: Brazil
- State: Sergipe
- Municipality: Areia Branca
- Elevation: 172 m (564 ft)

Manilha de Baixo (Brazilian Portuguese pronunciation: [mɐˈnjɐ ˈdi ˈbaʃʊ]) is a village in the municipality of Areia Branca, state of Sergipe, in northeastern Brazil. In Portuguese "manilha de baixo" means "lower shackle".

== See also ==
- List of villages in Sergipe
