= Altos Verdes =

- Village
- Location of Carira in Sergipe

- Location within Brazil
- Coordinates: 10°22′35″S 37°36′37″W
- Country: Brazil
- State: Sergipe
- Municipality: Carira
- Elevation: 261 m (856 ft)
- Population (2022): 827

Altos Verdes (Brazilian Portuguese pronunciation: [ˈawtʊs ˈveɦdi]) is a village in the municipality of Carira, state of Sergipe, in northeastern Brazil. As of 2022, it had a population of 827. In Portuguese "altos verdes" means "high greens" or "tall greens".

== See also ==
- List of villages in Sergipe
