= Coité dos Borges =

- Village
- Location of Frei Paulo in Sergipe

- Location within Brazil
- Coordinates: 10°33′31″S 37°29′09″W
- Country: Brazil
- State: Sergipe
- Municipality: Frei Paulo
- Elevation: 276 m (906 ft)

Coité dos Borges or Coité (Brazilian Portuguese pronunciation: [koˈtʃɛ ˈdʊɦ 'bɔʒi]) is a village in the municipality of Frei Paulo, state of Sergipe, in northeastern Brazil.

== See also ==
- List of villages in Sergipe
