= Três Tanques =

- Village
- Location of Carira in Sergipe

- Location within Brazil
- Coordinates: 10°25′54″S 37°46′37″W
- Country: Brazil
- State: Sergipe
- Municipality: Carira
- Elevation: 259 m (850 ft)

Três Tanques (Brazilian Portuguese pronunciation: [ˈtɾejɦ ˈtɐ̃jki]) is a village in the municipality of Carira, state of Sergipe, in northeastern Brazil. In Portuguese "três tanques" means "three ponds".

== See also ==
- List of villages in Sergipe
