= Guidinha =

- Village
- Location of Areia Branca in Sergipe

- Location within Brazil
- Coordinates: 10°46′11″S 37°18′0″W
- Country: Brazil
- State: Sergipe
- Municipality: Areia Branca
- Elevation: 175 m (574 ft)

Guidinha (Brazilian Portuguese pronunciation: [ɡiˈdij̃ɐ]) is a village in the municipality of Areia Branca, state of Sergipe, in northeastern Brazil.

== See also ==
- List of villages in Sergipe
