= Roseli Nunes =

Village in Brazil

- Village
- Location of Carira in Sergipe

- Location within Brazil
- Coordinates: 10°14′5″S 37°42′48″W
- Country: Brazil
- State: Sergipe
- Municipality: Carira
- Elevation: 300 m (980 ft)

Roseli Nunes (Brazilian Portuguese pronunciation: [ʁozeˈli ˈnuniz]) is a village in the municipality of Carira, state of Sergipe, in northeastern Brazil.

== See also ==
- List of villages in Sergipe
