= Areias, Frei Paulo =

Areias
- Village
- Location of Frei Paulo in Sergipe

- Location within Brazil
- Coordinates: 10°28′16″S 37°35′26″W
- Country: Brazil
- State: Sergipe
- Municipality: Frei Paulo
- Elevation: 315 m (1,033 ft)
- Population (2022): 80

Areias (Brazilian Portuguese pronunciation: ['ɐɾeɐz])is a village in the municipality of Frei Paulo, state of Sergipe, in northeastern Brazil. As of 2022, it had a population of 80. In Portuguese the word "areias" means "sands".

== See also ==
- List of villages in Sergipe
