= Cajueiro (village) =

- Village
- Location of Areia Branca in Sergipe

- Location within Brazil
- Coordinates: 10°50′10″S 37°23′41″W
- Country: Brazil
- State: Sergipe
- Municipality: Areia Branca
- Elevation: 177 m (581 ft)
- Population (2022): 157

Cajueiro (Brazilian Portuguese pronunciation: [kɐʒʊˈeɾʊ])is a village in the municipality of Areia Branca, state of Sergipe, in northeastern Brazil. As of 2022 it had a population of 157. It is named after the Portuguese word for the cashew tree.

== See also ==
- List of villages in Sergipe
