= Contendas de Cima =

- Village
- Location of Carira in Sergipe

- Location within Brazil
- Coordinates: 10°20′51″S 37°40′15″W
- Country: Brazil
- State: Sergipe
- Municipality: Carira
- Elevation: 325 m (1,066 ft)
- Population (2022): 139

Contendas de Cima (Brazilian Portuguese pronunciation: [kõˈtẽdɐ ˈdi ˈsimɐ]) is a village in the municipality of Carira, state of Sergipe, in northeastern Brazil. In Portuguese "contendas de baixo" means "upper battles" or "upper fights".

== See also ==
- List of villages in Sergipe
