= São Cristóvão, Carira =

São Cristóvão
- Village
- Location of Carira in Sergipe

- Location within Brazil
- Coordinates: 10°12′31″S 37°41′24″W
- Country: Brazil
- State: Sergipe
- Municipality: Carira
- Elevation: 266 m (873 ft)
- Population (2022): 121

São Cristóvão (Brazilian Portuguese pronunciation: [ˈsɐ̃w kɾiʃˈtɔvɐ̃w or ˈsɐ̃w kɾiʃˈtɔvʊ]) is a village in the municipality of Carira, state of Sergipe, in northeastern Brazil. As of 2022 it had a population of 121. It is named after Saint Christopher.

== See also ==
- List of villages in Sergipe
