= Edimilson Oliveira =

- Village
- Location of Carira in Sergipe

- Location within Brazil
- Coordinates: 10°19′3″S 37°44′27″W
- Country: Brazil
- State: Sergipe
- Municipality: Carira
- Elevation: 294 m (965 ft)
- Population (2022): 146

Edimilson Oliveira or Projeto de Assentamento Edimilson Oliveira (Brazilian Portuguese pronunciation: [ediˈmiwsʊ oliˈveɾɐ]) is a village in the municipality of Carira, state of Sergipe, in northeastern Brazil. As of 2022 it had a population of 146.

== See also ==
- List of villages in Sergipe
