= Baixa Grande (Carira) =

- Village
- Location of Carira in Sergipe

- Location within Brazil
- Coordinates: 10°19′16″S 37°40′6″W
- Country: Brazil
- State: Sergipe
- Municipality: Carira
- Elevation: 315 m (1,033 ft)
- Population (2022): 328

Baixa Grande (Brazilian Portuguese pronunciation: [ˈbaʃɐ ˈgɾɐ̃di]) is a village in the municipality of Carira, state of Sergipe, in northeastern Brazil. As of 2022, it had a population of 328. In Portuguese "baixa grande" means "large low place" or "large depression".

== See also ==
- List of villages in Sergipe
