= Pulgas =

- Village
- Location of Carira in Sergipe

- Location within Brazil
- Coordinates: 10°26′3″S 37°42′42″W
- Country: Brazil
- State: Sergipe
- Municipality: Carira
- Elevation: 293 m (961 ft)

Pulgas (Brazilian Portuguese pronunciation: [ˈpuɡɐ]) is a village in the municipality of Carira, state of Sergipe, in northeastern Brazil. In Portuguese "pulgas" means "fleas".

== See also ==
- List of villages in Sergipe
