= Lagoa Grande (Carira) =

- Village
- Location of Carira in Sergipe

- Location within Brazil
- Coordinates: 10°12′16″S 37°43′46″W
- Country: Brazil
- State: Sergipe
- Municipality: Carira
- Elevation: 285 m (935 ft)

Lagoa Grande (Brazilian Portuguese pronunciation: [lɐˈɡoɐ ˈɡɾɐ̃di]) is a village in the municipality of Carira, state of Sergipe, in northeastern Brazil. In Portuguese "lagoa grande" means "big lake".

== See also ==
- List of villages in Sergipe
