= Campos Novos (Carira) =

- Village
- Location of Carira in Sergipe

- Location within Brazil
- Coordinates: 10°24′14″S 37°39′9″W
- Country: Brazil
- State: Sergipe
- Municipality: Carira
- Elevation: 289 m (948 ft)

Campos Novos (Brazilian Portuguese pronunciation: ['kɐ̃pʊ 'novʊ]) is a village in the municipality of Carira, state of Sergipe, in northeastern Brazil. In Portuguese "campos novos" means "new fields".

== See also ==
- List of villages in Sergipe
