= Descoberto (Carira) =

- Village
- Location of Carira in Sergipe

- Location within Brazil
- Coordinates: 10°19′51″S 37°43′42″W
- Country: Brazil
- State: Sergipe
- Municipality: Carira
- Elevation: 416 m (1,365 ft)
- Population (2022): 836

Descoberto (Brazilian Portuguese pronunciation: [dizkʊˈbɛɦtʊ]) is a village in the municipality of Carira, state of Sergipe, in northeastern Brazil. As of 2022 it had a population of 836. In Portuguese "descoberto" means "discovered".

== See also ==
- List of villages in Sergipe
