= Barro Branco =

Village in Sergipe, Brazil

- Village
- Location of Frei Paulo in Sergipe

- Location within Brazil
- Coordinates: 10°30′21″S 37°33′40″W
- Country: Brazil
- State: Sergipe
- Municipality: Frei Paulo
- Elevation: 262 m (860 ft)

Barro Branco is a village in the municipality of Frei Paulo, state of Sergipe, in northeastern Brazil. In Portuguese "barro branco" means "white clay".

== See also ==
- List of villages in Sergipe
