= Beija-Flor de Baixo =

- Village
- Location of Pinhão in Sergipe

- Location within Brazil
- Coordinates: 10°34′44″S 37°42′38″W
- Country: Brazil
- State: Sergipe
- Municipality: Pinhão
- Elevation: 269 m (883 ft)

Beija-Flor de Baixo (Brazilian Portuguese pronunciation: [beʒɐˈflo ˈdi ˈbaʃʊ]) is a village in the municipality of Pinhão, state of Sergipe, in northeastern Brazil. In portuguese "beija-flor de baixo" means "lower hummingbird".

== See also ==
- List of villages in Sergipe
