= Boqueirão, Areia Branca =

Boqueirão
- Village
- Location of Areia Branca in Sergipe

- Location within Brazil
- Coordinates: 10°48′43″S 37°23′34″W
- Country: Brazil
- State: Sergipe
- Municipality: Areia Branca
- Elevation: 193 m (633 ft)
- Population (2022): 112

Boqueirão (Brazilian Portuguese pronunciation: [bʊkeˈɾɐ̃w]) is a village in the municipality of Areia Branca, state of Sergipe, in northeastern Brazil. As of 2022 it had a population of 112.

== See also ==
- List of villages in Sergipe
