= Pedrinhas, Areia Branca =

Pedrinhas
- Village
- Location of Areia Branca in Sergipe

- Location within Brazil
- Coordinates: 10°49′27″S 37°18′59″W
- Country: Brazil
- State: Sergipe
- Municipality: Areia Branca
- Elevation: 167 m (548 ft)
- Population (2022): 1,468

Pedrinhas (Brazilian Portuguese pronunciation: [pɜˈdɾiɲaz or pɛˈdij̃ɐ]) is a village in the municipality of Areia Branca, state of Sergipe, in northeastern Brazil. As of 2022 it had a population of 1468. In Portuguese "pedrinhas" means "pebbles".

== See also ==
- List of villages in Sergipe
