= Baixa Larga =

- Village
- Location of Pinhão in Sergipe

- Location within Brazil
- Coordinates: 10°34′3″S 37°48′2″W
- Country: Brazil
- State: Sergipe
- Municipality: Pinhão
- Elevation: 217 m (712 ft)

Baixa Larga (Brazilian Portuguese pronunciation: [ˈbɐʃɐ ˈlaɦɡɐ]) is a village in the municipality of Pinhão, state of Sergipe, in northeastern Brazil. In portuguese "baixa larga" means "wide depression".

== See also ==
- List of villages in Sergipe
