= Crioulo de Cima =

- Village
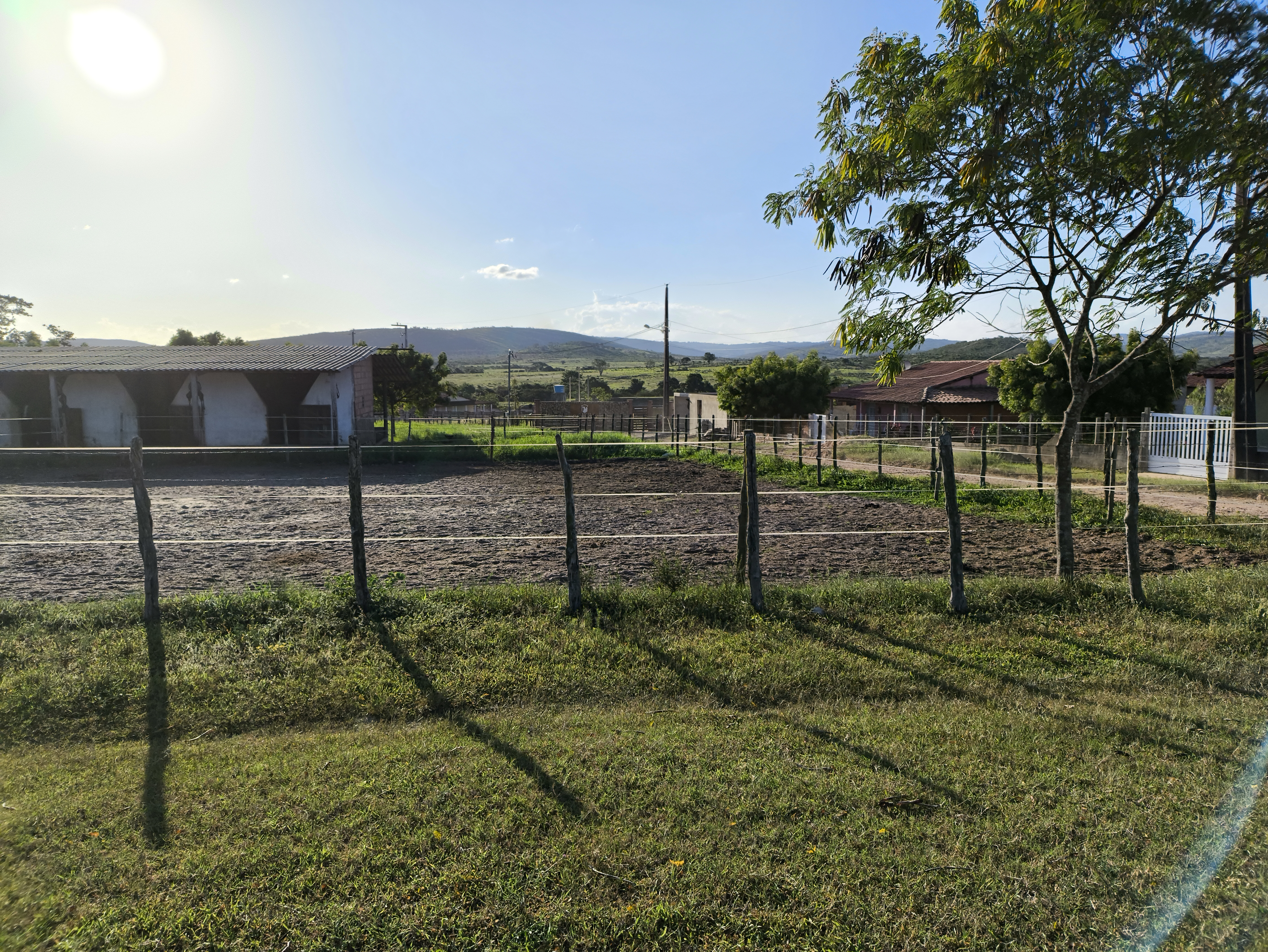
- Picture of the village

- Location of Lagarto in Sergipe

- Location within Brazil
- Coordinates: 10°57′54″S 37°45′12″W
- Country: Brazil
- State: Sergipe
- Municipality: Lagarto
- Elevation: 153 m (502 ft)
- Population (2022): 145

Crioulo de Cima (Brazilian Portuguese pronunciation: [kɾiˈolʊ ˈdi ˈsimɐ]) is a village in the municipality of Lagarto, state of Sergipe, in northeastern Brazil. As of 2022 it had a population of 145. In Portuguese "crioulo de cima" means "upper creole".

== Gallery ==
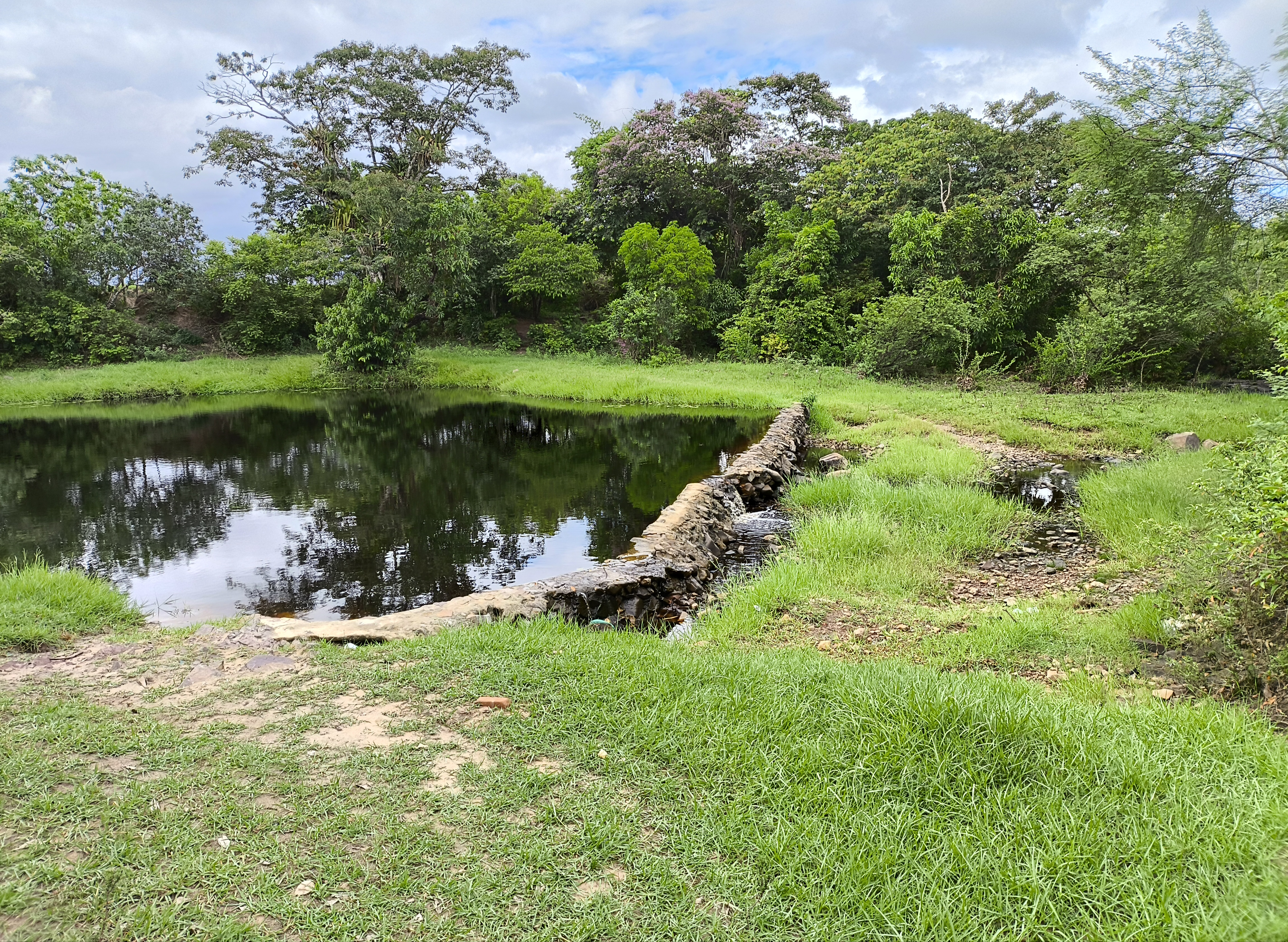

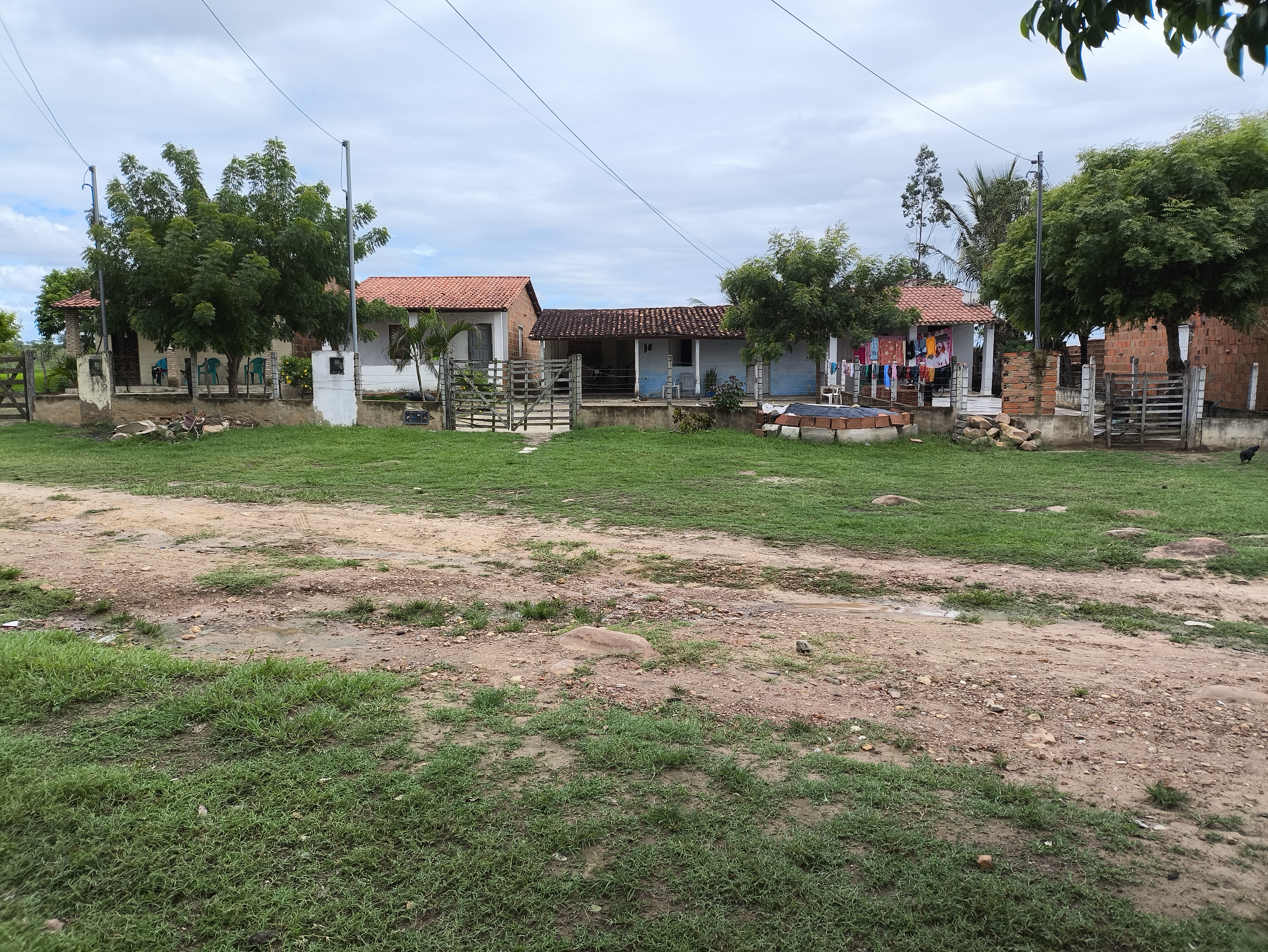

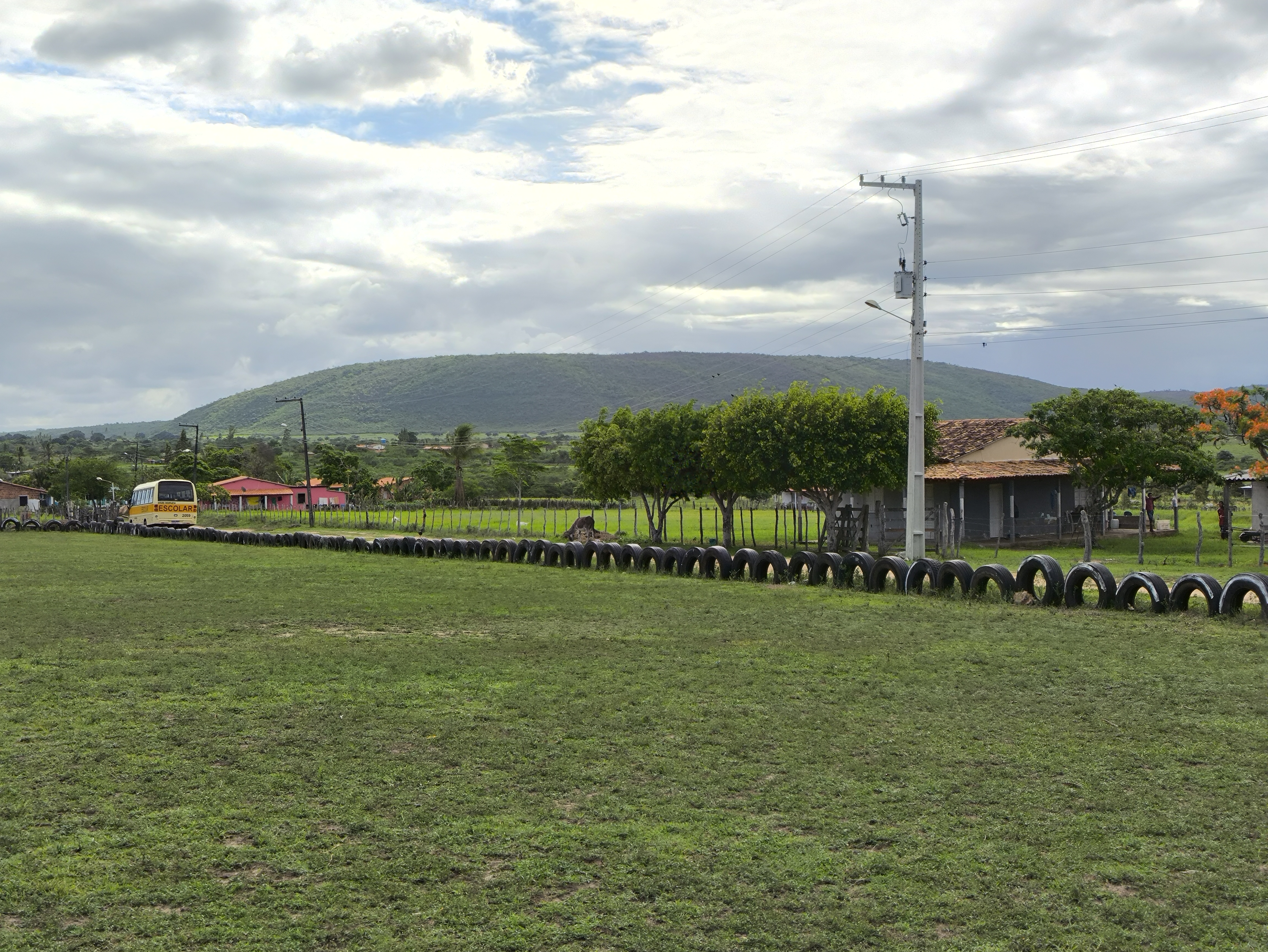

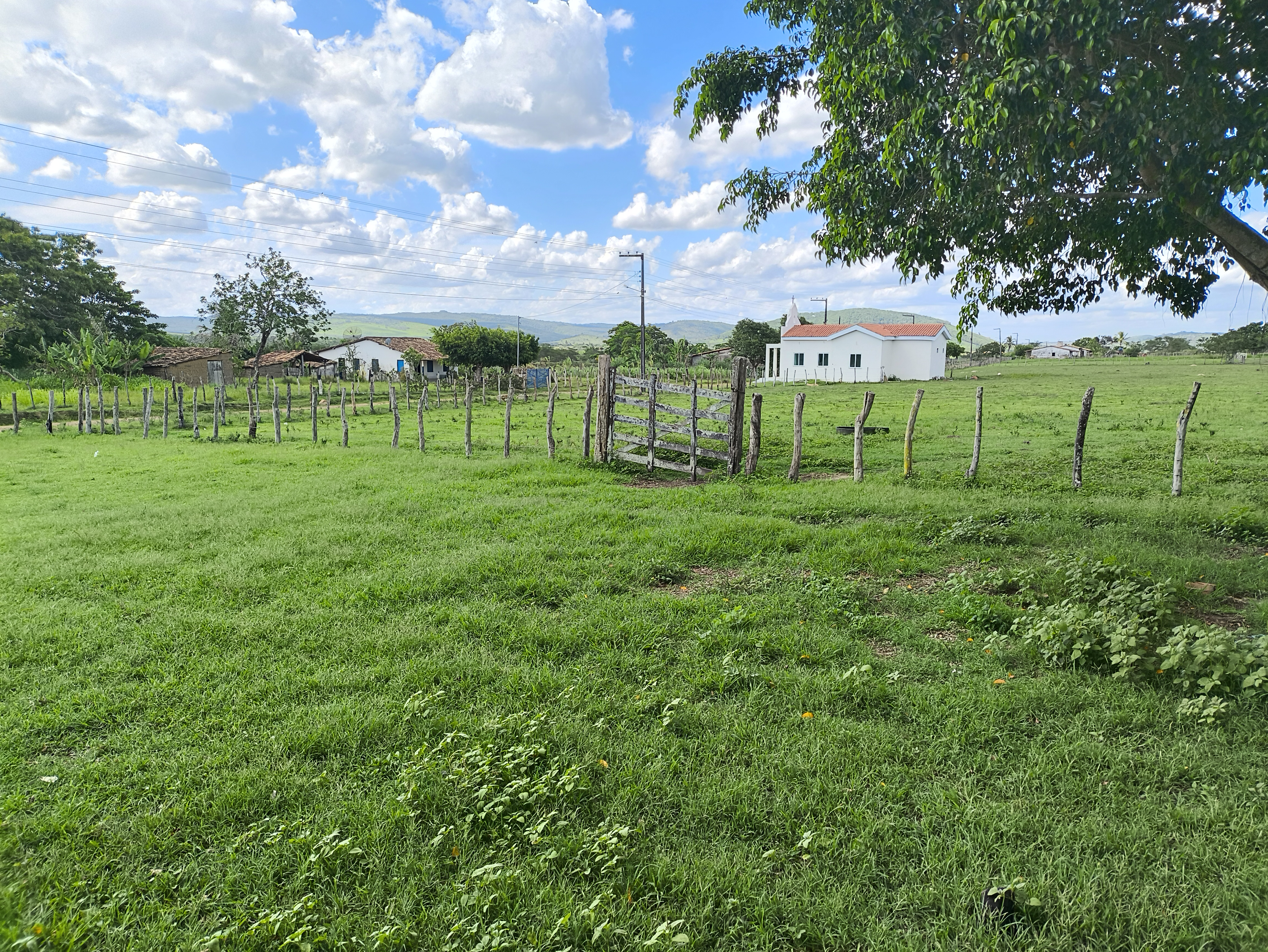

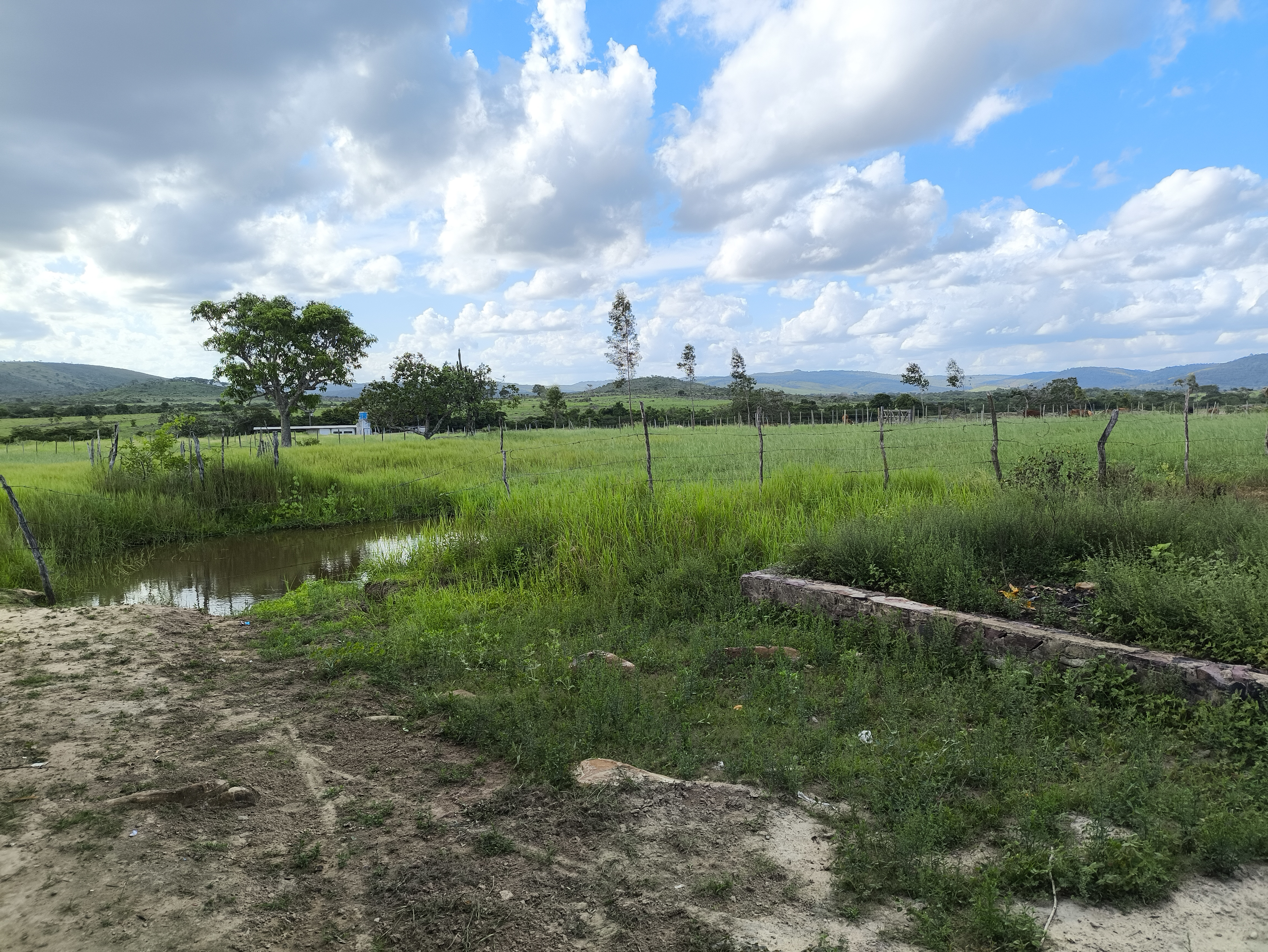

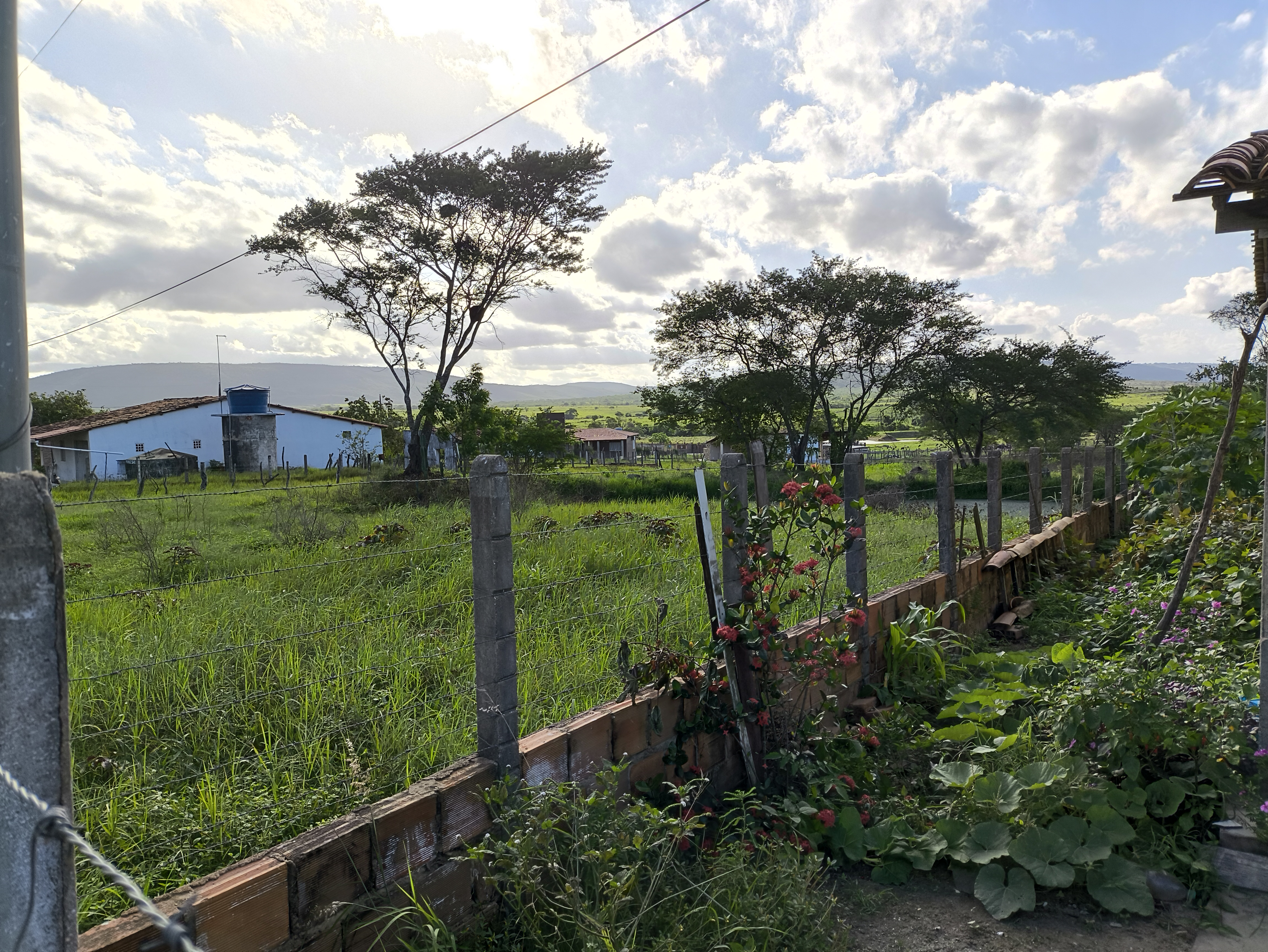

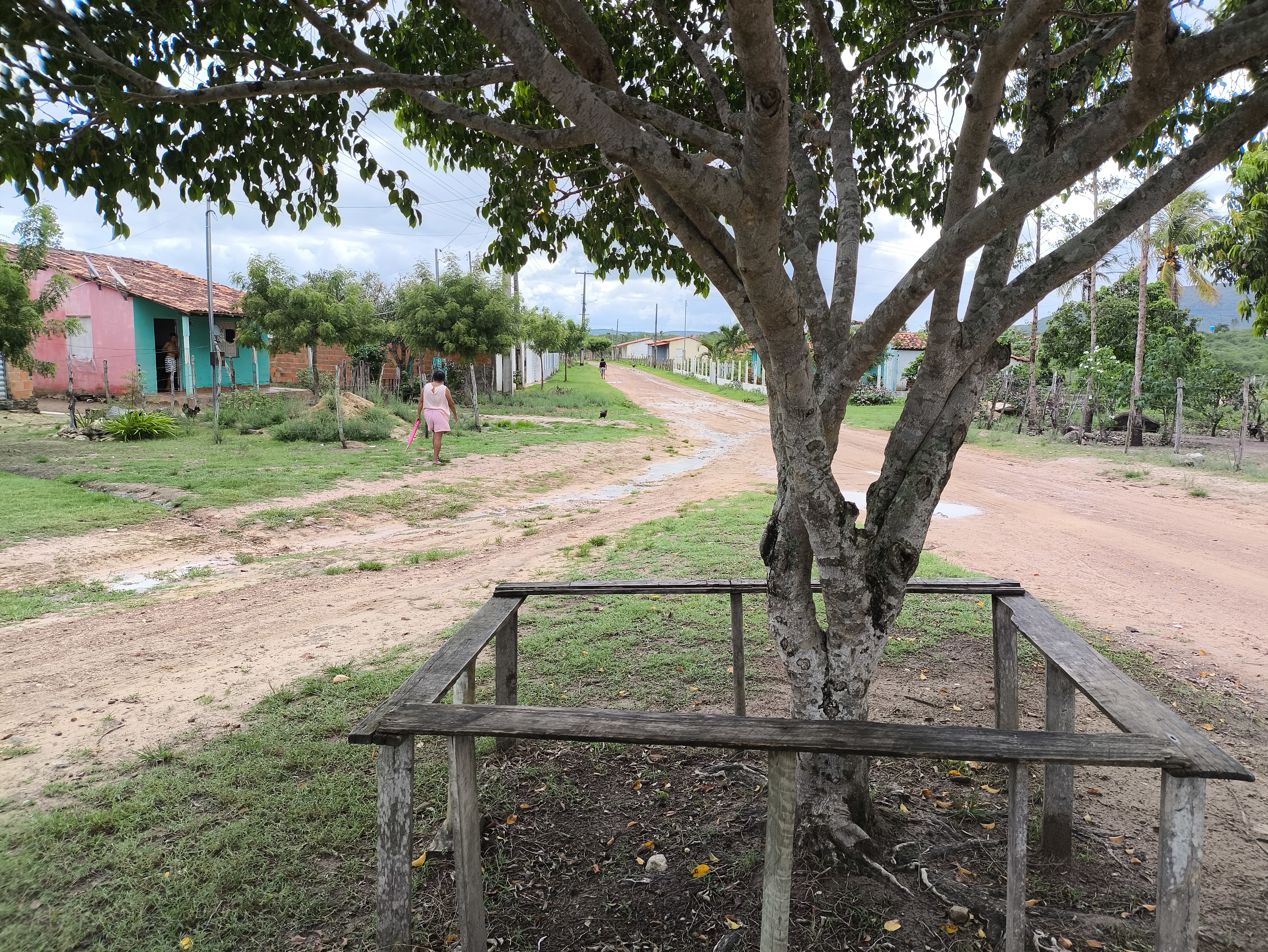

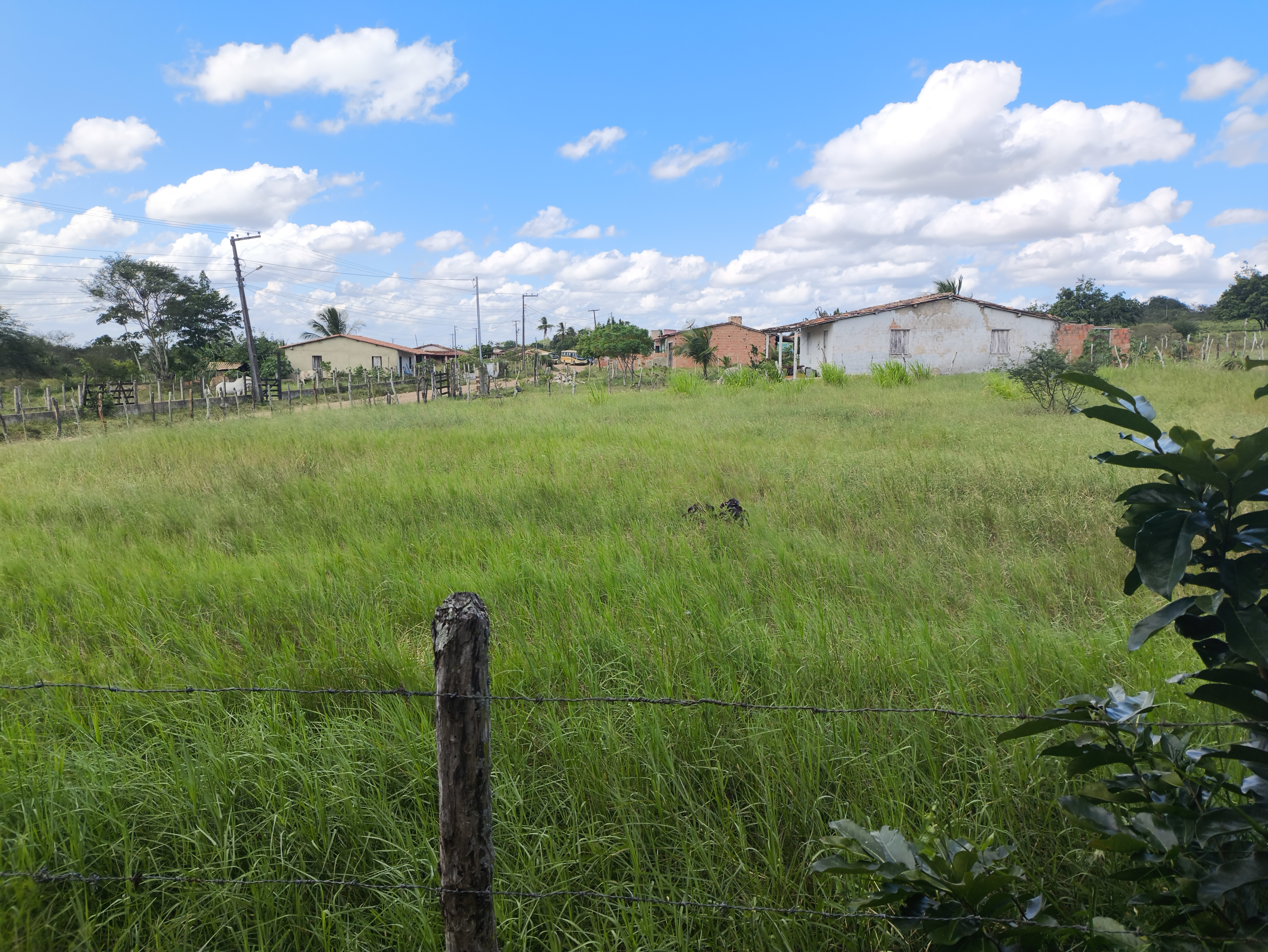

== See also ==
- List of villages in Sergipe
