= Manoel Martins =

- Village
- Location of Carira in Sergipe

- Location within Brazil
- Coordinates: 10°23′57″S 37°44′52″W
- Country: Brazil
- State: Sergipe
- Municipality: Carira
- Elevation: 290 m (950 ft)
- Population (2022): 260

Manoel Martins or Assentamento Manoel Martins (Brazilian Portuguese pronunciation: [mɐ̃nʊˈɛw maɦˈtinz]) is a village in the municipality of Carira, state of Sergipe, in northeastern Brazil. As of 2022 it had a population of 260.

== See also ==
- List of villages in Sergipe
