= Cambranganza =

- Village
- Location of Frei Paulo in Sergipe

- Location within Brazil
- Coordinates: 10°36′13″S 37°37′35″W
- Country: Brazil
- State: Sergipe
- Municipality: Frei Paulo
- Elevation: 248 m (814 ft)

Cambranganza (Brazilian Portuguese pronunciation: [kɐ̃bɾɐ̃ˈgɐ̃zɐ]) is a village in the municipality of Frei Paulo, state of Sergipe, in northeastern Brazil.

== See also ==
- List of villages in Sergipe
