= Contendas de Baixo =

- Village
- Location of Carira in Sergipe

- Location within Brazil
- Coordinates: 10°20′51″S 37°40′15″W
- Country: Brazil
- State: Sergipe
- Municipality: Carira
- Elevation: 350 m (1,150 ft)

Contendas de Baixo (Brazilian Portuguese pronunciation: [kõˈtẽdɐ ˈdi ˈbaʃʊ]) is a village in the municipality of Carira, state of Sergipe, in northeastern Brazil. In Portuguese "contendas de baixo" means "lower battles" or "lower fights".

== See also ==
- List of villages in Sergipe
