= Saco Torto =

- Village
- Location of Carira in Sergipe

- Location within Brazil
- Coordinates: 10°20′48″S 37°42′35″W
- Country: Brazil
- State: Sergipe
- Municipality: Carira
- Elevation: 401 m (1,316 ft)

Saco Torto (Brazilian Portuguese pronunciation: [ˈsakʊ ˈtoɦtʊ]) is a village in the municipality of Carira, state of Sergipe, in northeastern Brazil. In Portuguese "saco torto" means "crooked sack" or "crooked bag".

== See also ==
- List of villages in Sergipe
