= Chico Gomes =

- Village
- Location of Areia Branca in Sergipe

- Location within Brazil
- Coordinates: 10°46′24″S 37°20′13″W
- Country: Brazil
- State: Sergipe
- Municipality: Areia Branca
- Elevation: 201 m (659 ft)
- Population (2022): 298

Chico Gomes (Brazilian Portuguese pronunciation: [ˈʃikʊ ˈɡomiz]) is a village in the municipality of Areia Branca, state of Sergipe, in northeastern Brazil. As of 2022 it had a population of 298.

== See also ==
- List of villages in Sergipe
