= Colônia São Paulo =

- Village
- Location of Areia Branca in Sergipe

- Location within Brazil
- Coordinates: 10°45′49″S 37°17′9″W
- Country: Brazil
- State: Sergipe
- Municipality: Areia Branca
- Elevation: 168 m (551 ft)

Colônia São Paulo (Brazilian Portuguese pronunciation: [kɔˈlonjɐ ˈsɐ̃w ˈpɐwlʊ]) is a village in the municipality of Areia Branca, state of Sergipe, in northeastern Brazil. It is named after Saint Paul the apostle.

== See also ==
- List of villages in Sergipe
