= Gracho Cardoso =

Municipality in Sergipe, Brazil

Gracho Cardoso Município de Gracho Cardoso
- Municipality
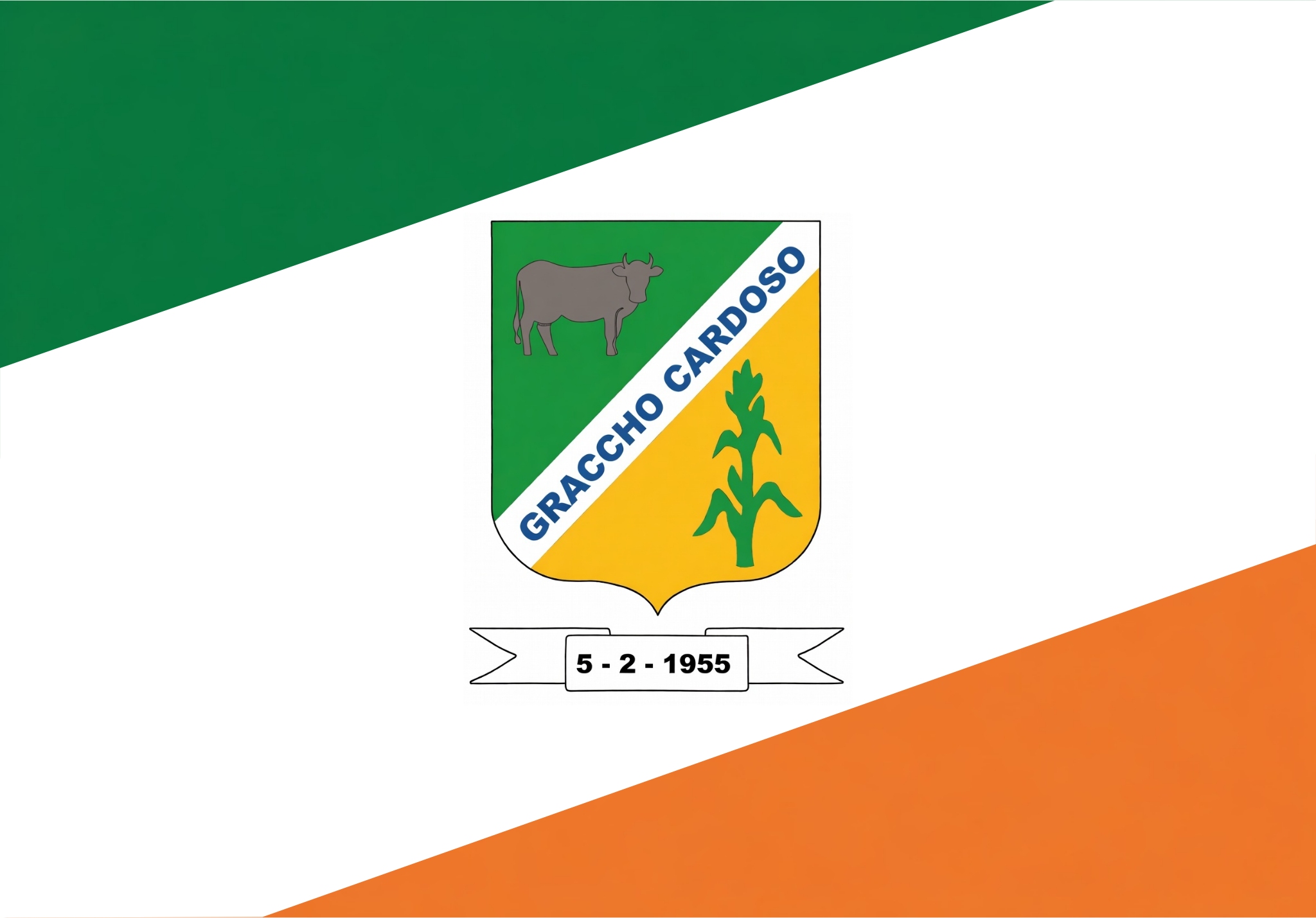
- Flag Coat of arms

- Location of Gracho Cardoso in Sergipe

- Location of Gracho Cardoso in Brazil
- Coordinates: 10°13′37″S 37°11′52″W
- Country: Brazil
- Region: Northeast
- State: Sergipe
- Founded: 1955

Government
  - Mayor: Jose Nicarcio De Aragao

Area
  - Total: 242.5 km^{2} (93.6 sq mi)
- Elevation: 242 m (794 ft)

Population (2020)
  - Total: 5,824
  - Density: 24.02/km^{2} (62.20/sq mi)
- Demonym: Gracho-cardosense
- Time zone: UTC−3 (BRT)
- Website: grachocardoso.se.io.org.br

Gracho Cardoso (Brazilian Portuguese pronunciation: [ˈɡɾakʊ kɐɦˈdozu]) is a municipality located in the Brazilian state of Sergipe. It covers 242.5 km^{2} (93.6 mi^{2}), and has a population of 5,824 with a population density of 24 inhabitants per square kilometer.

== See also ==
- List of municipalities in Sergipe
