= Indiaroba =

Municipality of Sergipe, Brazil

Coordinates: 11°31′08″S 37°30′43″W

- Municipality
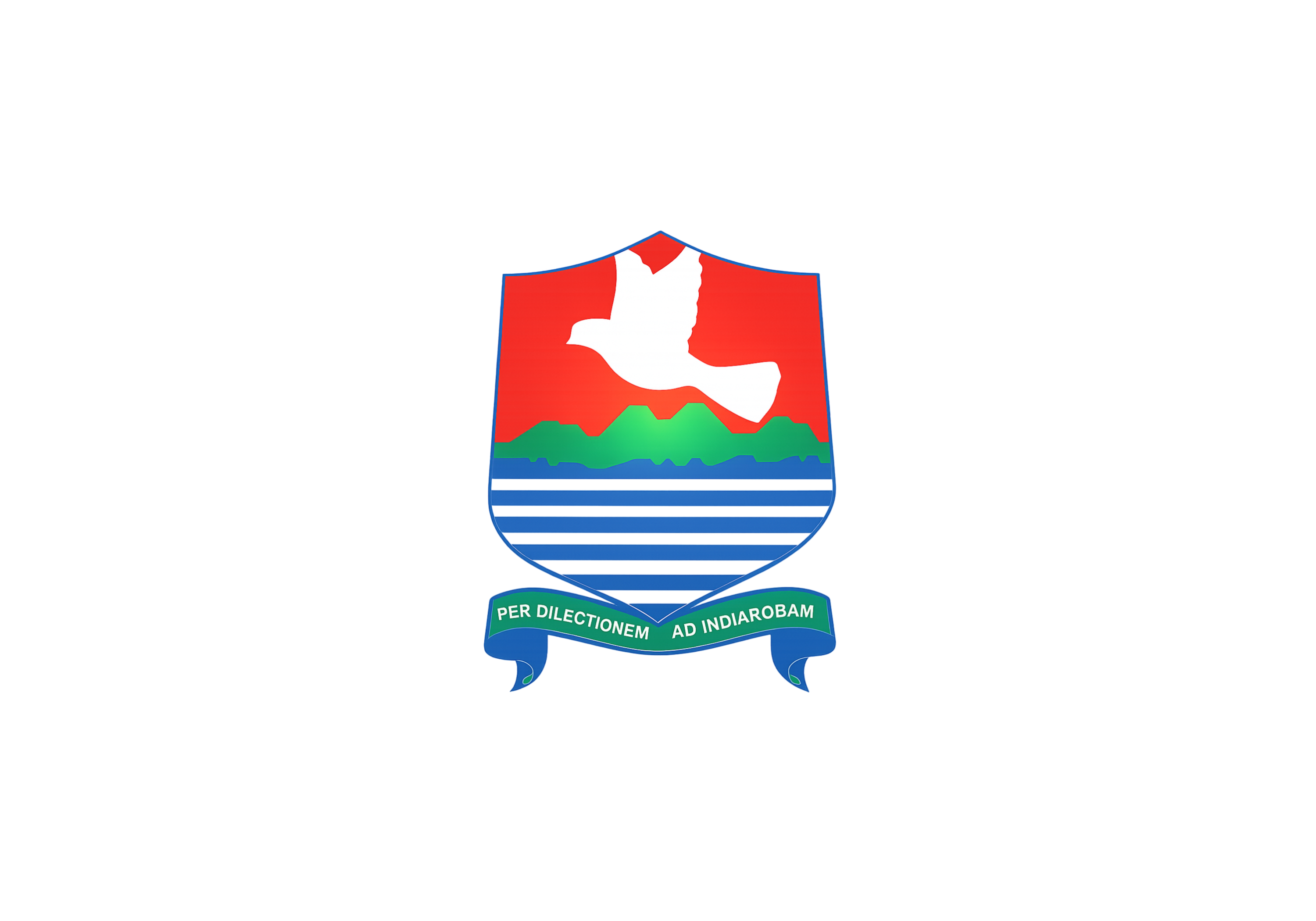
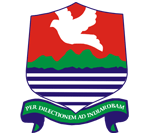
- Flag Coat of arms
- Interactive map of Indiaroba
- Country: Brazil
- Time zone: UTC−3 (BRT)

Indiaroba (Brazilian Portuguese: [ĩdʒi.aˈɾɔbɐ]) is a municipality located in the Brazilian state of Sergipe. Its population was 18,149 (2020) and its area is 314 km^{2}.

== See also ==
- List of municipalities in Sergipe
