= Serra Redonda (Frei Paulo) =

Village in Sergipe, Brazil

- Village
- Location of Frei Paulo in Sergipe

- Location within Brazil
- Coordinates: 10°31′45″S 37°30′8″W
- Country: Brazil
- State: Sergipe
- Municipality: Frei Paulo
- Elevation: 290 m (950 ft)
- Population (2022): 639

Serra Redonda is a village in the municipality of Frei Paulo, state of Sergipe, in northeastern Brazil. As of 2022, it had a population of 639. In Portuguese "serra redonda" means "round hill".
