= Serras Pretas =

Village in Sergipe, Brazil

- Village
- Location of Frei Paulo in Sergipe

- Location within Brazil
- Coordinates: 10°30′11″S 37°36′57″W
- Country: Brazil
- State: Sergipe
- Municipality: Frei Paulo
- Elevation: 210 m (690 ft)

Serras Pretas is a village in the municipality of Frei Paulo, state of Sergipe, in northeastern Brazil. In Portuguese "serras pretas" means "black hills".
