= Japoatã =

Municipality in Sergipe, Brazil

Coordinates: 10°20′49″S 36°48′03″W

- Municipality
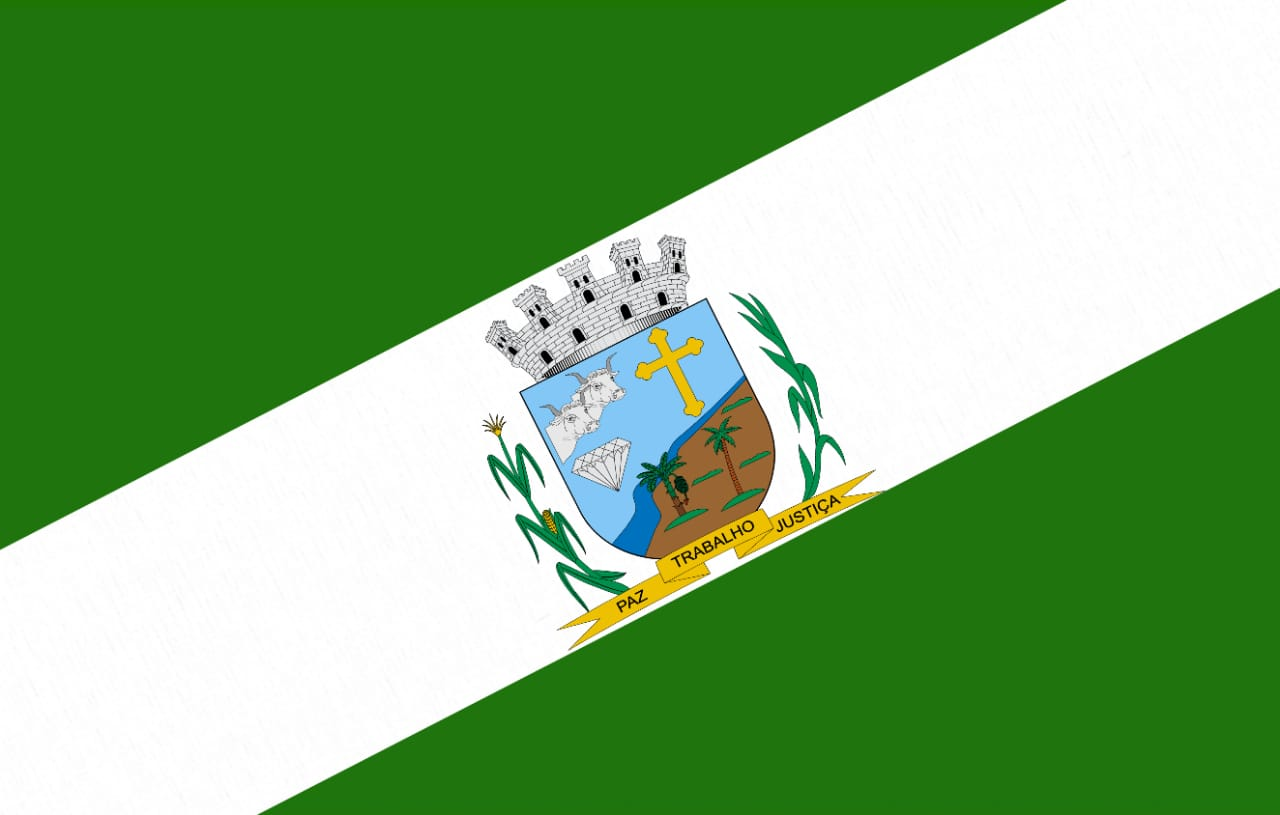
- Flag Coat of arms
- Interactive map of Japoatã
- Country: Brazil
- Time zone: UTC−3 (BRT)

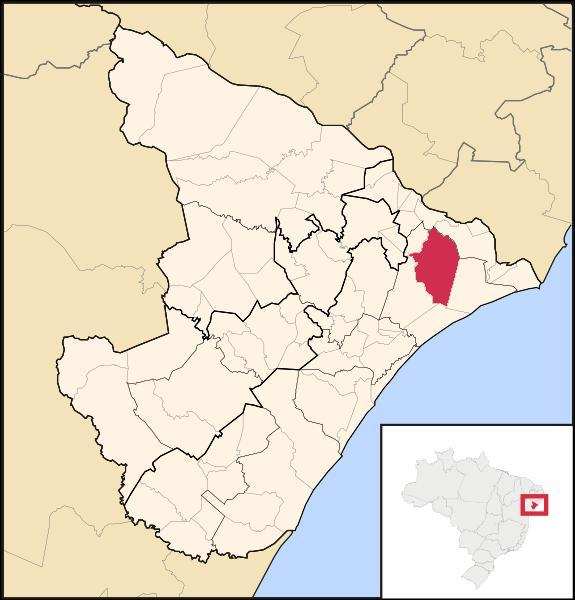

Japoatã (Brazilian Portuguese pronunciation: [ʒapoɐˈtɐ̃]) is a municipality located in the Brazilian state of Sergipe. Its population was 13,429 (2020) and its area is 420 km^{2} (160 sq mi).

== See also ==
- List of municipalities in Sergipe
