= Selão =

Village in Sergipe, Brazil

- Village
- Location of Frei Paulo in Sergipe

- Location within Brazil
- Coordinates: 10°28′50″S 37°33′35″W
- Country: Brazil
- State: Sergipe
- Municipality: Frei Paulo
- Elevation: 304 m (997 ft)

Selão or Celão, is a village in the municipality of Frei Paulo, state of Sergipe, in northeastern Brazil. In Portuguese the name "selão" means "big saddle".
