= Canhoba =

Municipality in Sergipe, Brazil

Coordinates: 10°08′16″S 36°59′06″W

- Municipality
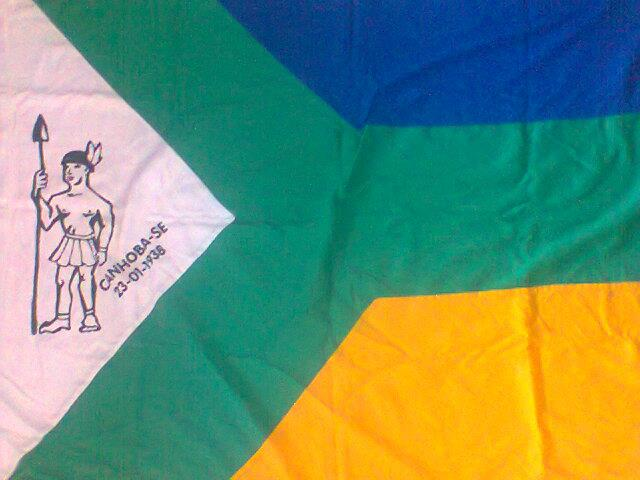
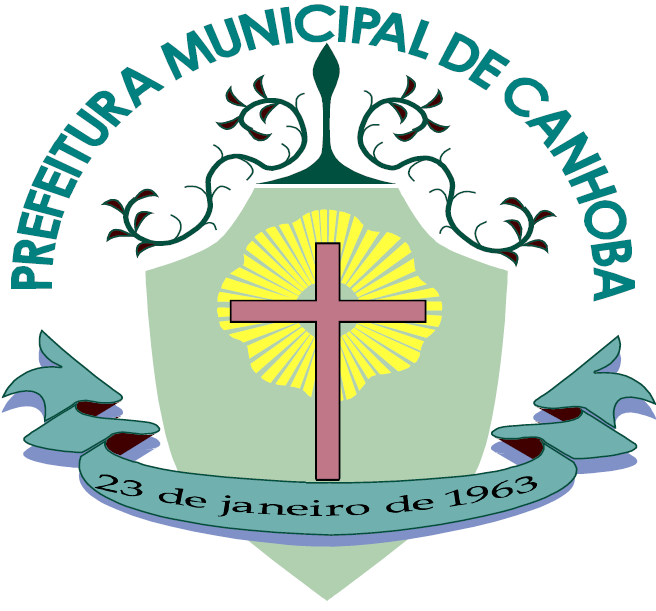
- Flag Coat of arms
- Interactive map of Canhoba
- Country: Brazil
- Time zone: UTC−3 (BRT)

Canhoba (Brazilian Portuguese pronunciation: [kɐ̃ˈɲɔbɐ]) is a municipality located in the Brazilian state of Sergipe. Its population was 4,006 (2020) and its area is 170 km^{2} (66 sq mi).

== See also ==
- List of municipalities in Sergipe
