= Saquinho =

Village in Sergipe, Brazil

- Village
- Location of Frei Paulo in Sergipe

- Location within Brazil
- Coordinates: 10°27′40″S 37°35′20″W
- Country: Brazil
- State: Sergipe
- Municipality: Frei Paulo
- Elevation: 316 m (1,037 ft)

Saquinho is a village in the municipality of Frei Paulo, state of Sergipe, in northeastern Brazil. In Portuguese the name "saquinho" means "small sack".
