= Moita Bonita =

Municipality in Sergipe, Brazil

Moita Bonita Município de Moita Bonita
- Municipality
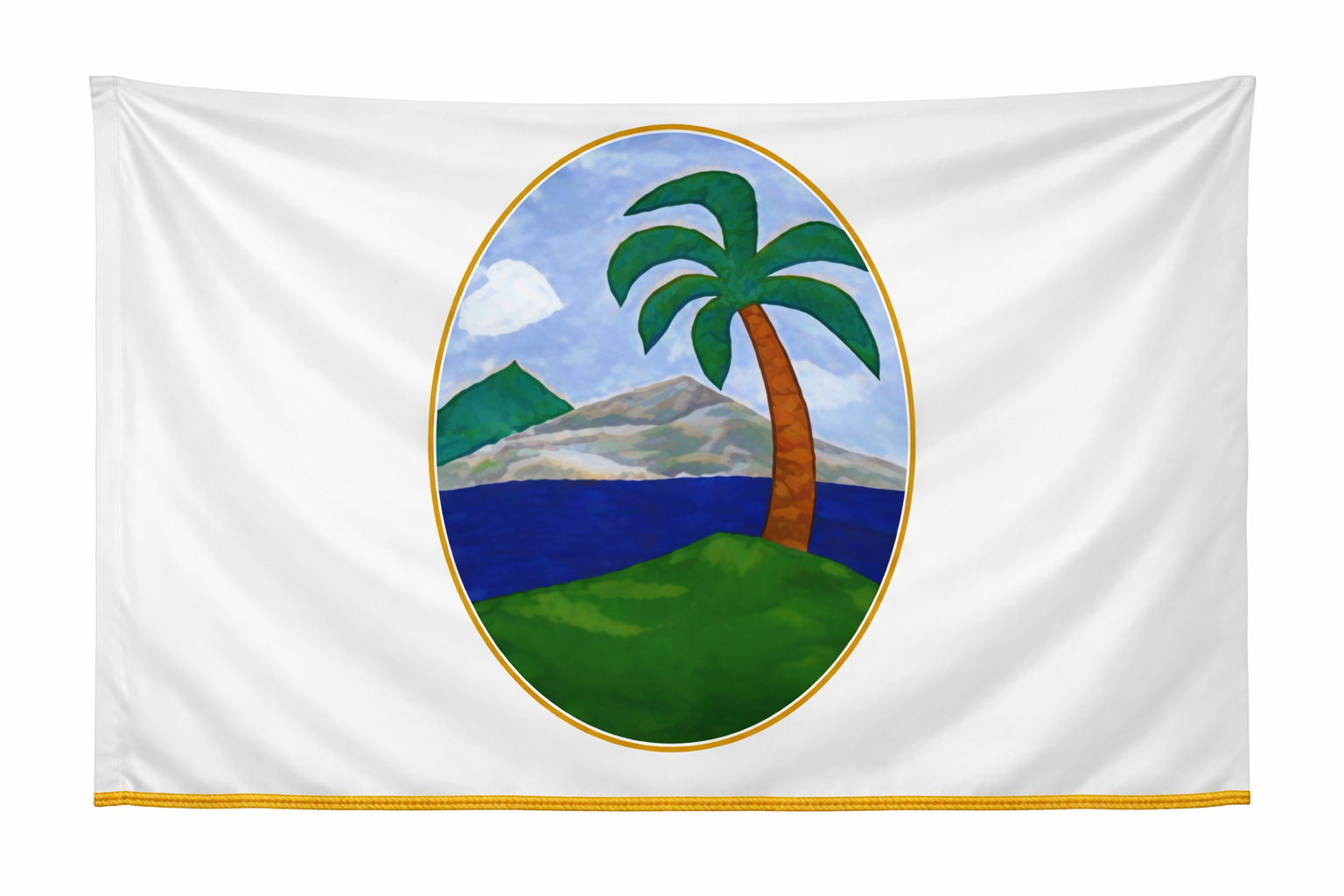
- Flag Coat of arms

- Location of Moita Bonita in Sergipe

- Location of Moita Bonita in Brazil
- Coordinates: 10°34′40″S 37°20′34″W
- Country: Brazil
- Region: Northeast
- State: Sergipe
- Founded: 1963

Government
  - Mayor: Marcos Antonio Costa

Area
  - Total: 96.53 km^{2} (37.27 sq mi)
- Elevation: 180 m (590 ft)

Population (2020)
  - Total: 11,348
  - Density: 117.6/km^{2} (304.5/sq mi)
- Demonym: Moita-bonitense
- Time zone: UTC−3 (BRT)
- Website: moitabonita.se.gov.br

Moita Bonita (Brazilian Portuguese pronunciation: [ˈmotʃɐ bʊˈnitɐ]) is a municipality located in the Brazilian state of Sergipe. Its population was 11,348 (2020) and covers 96.53 km^{2} (37.27 mi^{2}). Moita Bonita has a population density of 120 inhabitants per square kilometer. Moita Bonita is located 64 km (40 mi) from the state capital of Sergipe, Aracaju. Riachuelo borders the municipalities of Itabaiana, Ribeirópolis, Nossa Senhora das Dores, Santa Rosa de Lima, and Malhador, all within the state of Sergipe.

== See also ==
- List of municipalities in Sergipe
