= Nossa Senhora =

Nossa Senhora (Portuguese for "Our Lady") may refer to the following places:

== Angola ==
- Estádio Nossa Senhora do Monte, multi-use stadium
- Pavilhão Nossa Senhora do Monte, indoor sporting arena

== Brazil ==
- Nossa Senhora Aparecida, Sergipe
- Nossa Senhora da Glória, Sergipe
- Nossa Senhora das Dores, Sergipe
- Nossa Senhora de Lourdes, Sergipe
- Nossa Senhora do Livramento, Mato Grosso
- Nossa Senhora do Socorro
- Nossa Senhora dos Remédios, Piauí
- Nossa Senhora do Pau Assado, Aracajú

== Cape Verde ==
- Nossa Senhora da Ajuda (parish)
- Nossa Senhora da Conceição (São Filipe)
- Nossa Senhora da Graça (Praia)
- Nossa Senhora da Lapa (Ribeira Brava)
- Nossa Senhora da Luz (Maio)
- Nossa Senhora da Luz (São Domingos)
- Nossa Senhora da Luz (São Vicente)
- Nossa Senhora das Dores (Sal)
- Nossa Senhora do Livramento
- Nossa Senhora do Monte
- Nossa Senhora do Rosário (Ribeira Brava)
- Nossa Senhora do Rosário (Ribeira Grande)

== India (Portuguese East Indies) ==
- Catedral de Nossa Senhora dos Milagres
- Igreja de Nossa Senhora dos Milagres (Mangalore)

== Portugal ==
- Nossa Senhora da Conceição (Alandroal), a parish in the Alandroal Municipality
- Nossa Senhora da Conceição (Angra do Heroísmo), Azores
- Nossa Senhora da Conceição (Vila Real), a parish in the municipality of Vila Real
- Nossa Senhora do Monte (Portugal), Madeira
- Nossa Senhora do Pópulo, a parish in the municipality of Caldas da Rainha
- Nossa Senhora do Rosário, a parish in the municipality of Lagoa, Azores
- Nossa Senhora dos Remédios (Povoação), Azores

=== Churches and buildings ===
- Church of Nossa Senhora da Conceição Velha, Lisbon, Portugal
- Church of Nossa Senhora da Nazaré, Nazaré, Portugal
- Nossa Senhora da Conceição Fortress, Póvoa de Varzim, Portugal
