= Tenentist revolts in Sergipe =

First revolt of the 28th Battalion of Caçadores
- Part of Tenentism
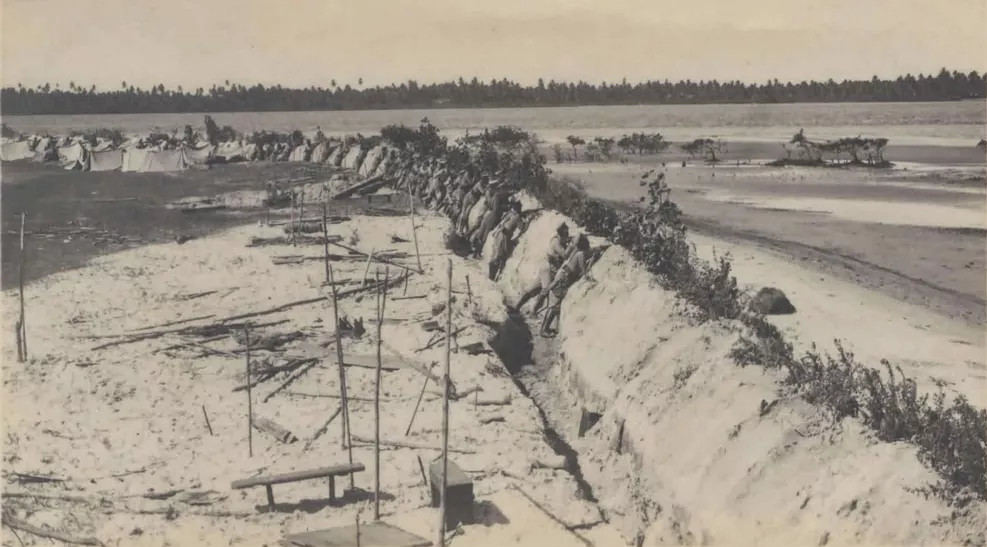
- The rebels' coastal defenses
| Date | 13 July – 3 August 1924 |
| Location | Sergipe, Brazil |
| Result | Loyalist victory |

Belligerents
| Rebels: Tenentist rebels | Loyalists: Army; Navy; State forces: Sergipe; Bahia; Alagoas; Irregulars ("patriots") |

Commanders and leaders
| Eurípedes de Lima; Augusto Maynard Gomes; João Soarino de Mello | Marçal Nonato de Faria |

Officers from the 28th Battalion of Caçadores (28th BC) of the Brazilian Army launched two tenentist revolts in Sergipe in 1924 and 1926. The first, inspired by the São Paulo Revolt of 1924, removed state governor Maurício Graccho Cardoso on 13 July and dominated the capital Aracaju until its defeat by loyalist troops on 3 August 1924. The second, inspired by the passage of the Prestes Column through Piauí, was launched on 18 January 1926 and suppressed in four hours of combat. The uprisings marked a combative political spirit in the battalion, and one of its leaders, Augusto Maynard Gomes, was appointed governor of Sergipe after the Revolution of 1930.

== The first revolt ==
In response to the tenentist revolt that began on 5 July 1924 in São Paulo, several battalions from Brazil's Northeast region received orders to embark for São Paulo, where they would join the loyalist forces. But the 28th BC, in Sergipe, was full of supporters of the revolt, and until a year earlier it was commanded by lieutenant colonel Bernardo de Araújo Lima, head of the garrison in uprising in Rio Claro, São Paulo. Based in the central area of Aracaju, its officers were immersed in street conversations, especially among the middle class.

Conspiracies soon began for an uprising in solidarity with that in São Paulo. For logistical reasons, an uprising in the Northeast was not in the plans of the rebels in São Paulo, and even they would be surprised by the news of its outbreak. The conspirators' goal in Sergipe was to prevent the 28th BC and other battalions from boarding for São Paulo, either by convincing them to join the revolt or by attracting them into a confrontation. In this way, the loyalist pressure on the São Paulo rebels would be relieved.

In the early hours of 13 July, captain Eurípedes Lima and lieutenants Maynard and Soarino took charge of the battalion. The soldiers present were divided into three platoons: one stayed with captain Euripedes in the barracks and the others left at 2:30 with the lieutenants. Soarino attacked the Government Palace, and Maynard, the most difficult target, the Police Battalion barracks. The Palace's guard, all lit up, was stunned by the shots of the attackers, hidden in the garden. After they fled, Soarino reinforced Maynard. The police barracks were surrounded and surrendered when the ammunition ran out. The rebels had no casualties, while the loyalists had two dead and two injured. Major Jacintho Dias Ribeiro, commander of the 28th BC, went to the battalion and tried to impose his authority, but was arrested by captain Eurípedes. Other officers who disagreed with the revolt were also arrested.

At 5:00 the state governor was surrounded in his residence, where he had only six guards. The rebels' objective was not statewide, but national, the deposition of president Artur Bernardes. So they invited the governor to join. When he refused, he was arrested. At dawn, the uprising was already much more successful than the one that occurred in São Paulo, which did not manage to depose the state government. The rebels offered the government to general Calazans, who also refused. The solution was to establish a military junta. There were no significant changes in public administration, and most authorities remained in their posts. Civil servants received no benefits or reprisals. Captain Euripedes exercised command of the battalion, but the charismatic leadership was that of lieutenant Maynard.

Many volunteers presented themselves to the battalion; when their numbers dwindled, captain Euripides mobilized the reservists on 26 July. From an initial force of 316 men, the rebels numbered 770. They had the sympathy of various social classes, but rumors about the loyalist reaction resulted in an exodus of Aracaju's population to the countryside. The rebels sought a deal with the local oligarchs, but these, in turn, saw the uprising as a threat to their power and mobilized their "patriots" to stop the revolt.

In order to defend Aracaju from an amphibious invasion, the rebels turned off the lighthouse, liad mines on the shore, removed the signaling buoys and dug trenches on the beaches. Captain Eurípedes remained in Aracaju, while lieutenants Maynard and Soarino organized land defenses, respectively on the northern (Rosário do Catete and Carmo) and southern (São Cristóvão and Itaporanga) fronts. The loyalist reaction was led by general Marçal Nonato de Faria, commander of the 6th Military Region. He had at his disposal the destroyer Alagoas, which appeared on the horizon in Aracaju on the 23rd, creating a stir.

The real offensive came from land. The 20th, 21st and 22nd battalions, which also had orders to board for São Paulo, remained in the Northeast. On 27 July, these three units and another contingent of the police were of Bahia were in Salgado, in the south, totaling 1,267 men. In the north, 332 irregulars and police soldiers from Alagoas were in Japaratuba. With the rebels surrounded, general Marçal called on them to surrender, recalling their numerical superiority and the failure of the rebellion in São Paulo. The leaders of the revolt fled Aracaju, and the loyalists entered the city without resistance on 3 August.

Maynard fled to São Paulo, where he was captured. He awaited trial imprisoned in the 28th Battalion, where he was popular among the troops and the prison regime was liberal, allowing the planning of a new uprising. On the night of 8 January 1926, he and his former companions led the battalion to strategic points in the city. This time, the police reaction was stronger and the uprising was put down after four hours of fighting, in which Maynard was injured.
