= Carmópolis =

Municipality in Sergipe, Brazil

Carmópolis Município de Carmópolis
- Municipality
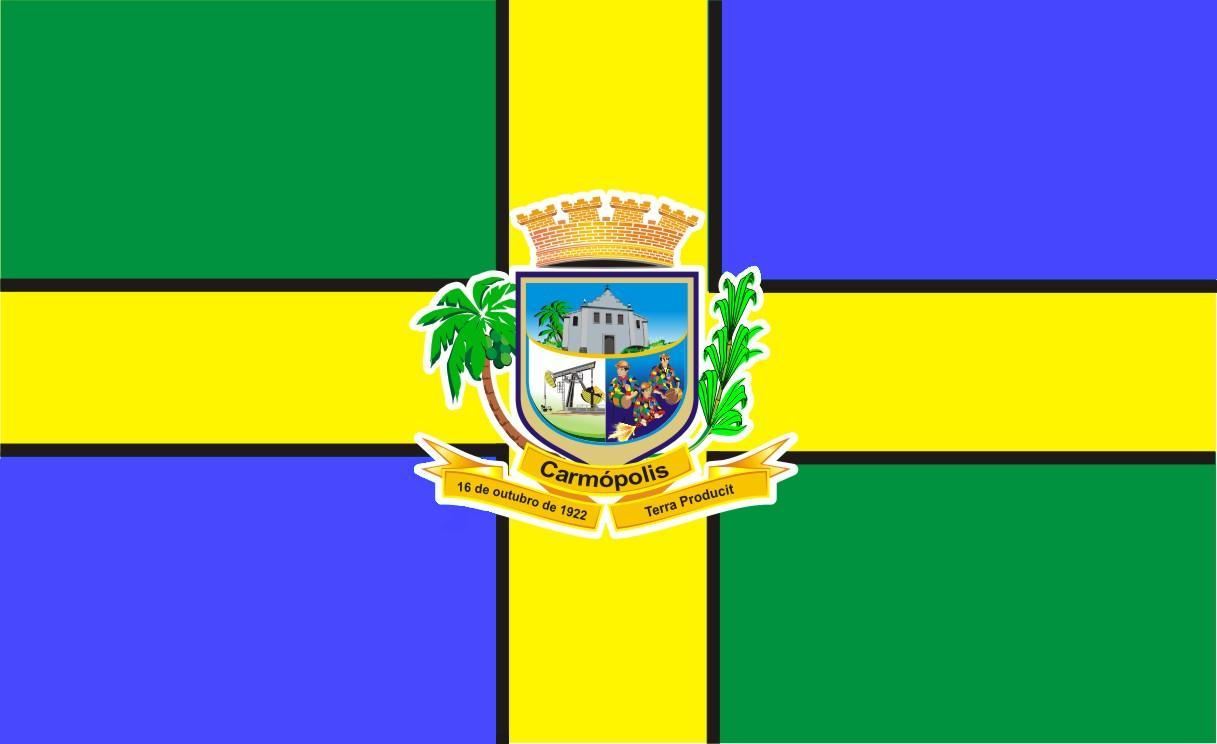
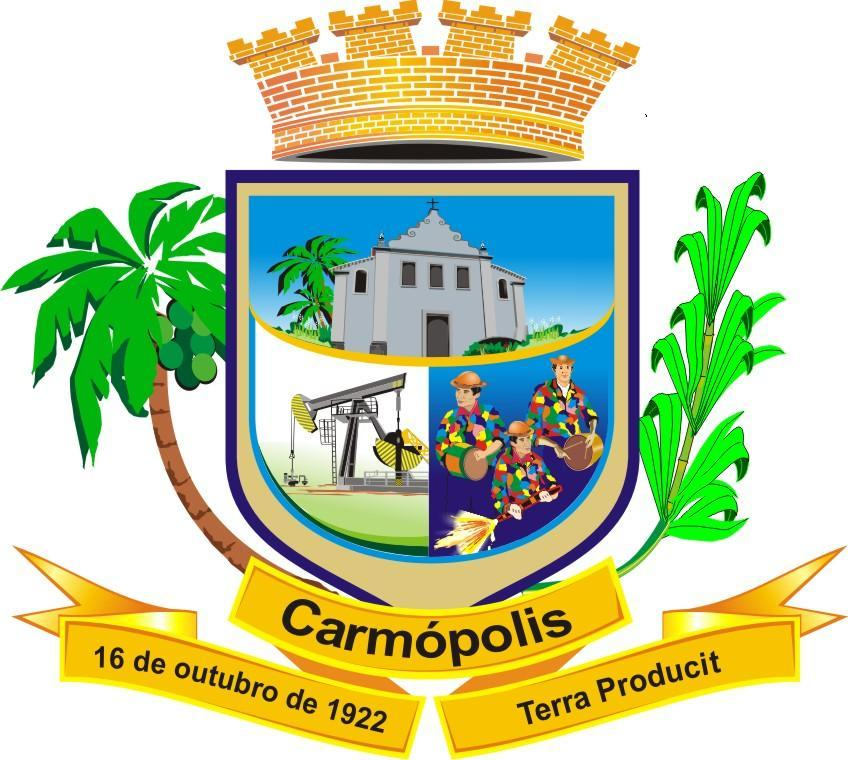
- Flag Coat of arms

- Location of Carmópolis in Sergipe

- Location of Carmópolis in Brazil
- Coordinates: 10°38′52″S 36°59′20″W
- Country: Brazil
- Region: Northeast
- State: Sergipe
- Founded: October 16, 1922

Government
  - Mayor: Esmeralda Mara Silva Cruz

Area
  - Total: 45.66 km^{2} (17.63 sq mi)
- Elevation: 13 m (43 ft)

Population (2020)
  - Total: 16,937
  - Density: 370.9/km^{2} (960.7/sq mi)
- Demonym: Carmopolense
- Time zone: UTC−3 (BRT)
- Website: carmopolis.se.gov.br

Carmópolis is a (Brazilian Portuguese pronunciation: [kɐɦˈmɔpolis]) municipality located in the Brazilian state of Sergipe. Its population was 16,937 (2020). Carmópolis covers 45.66 km^{2} (17.63 mi^{2}) and has a population density of 294.15 inhabitants per square kilometer. It is located 30.6 km (19.0 mi) from the state capital of Sergipe, Aracaju. Carmópolis borders on the municipalities of Japaratuba, Rosário do Catete, General Maynard, and Santo Amaro das Brotas, all in the state of Sergipe.

== See also ==
- List of municipalities in Sergipe
