= Cedro de São João =

Coordinates: 10°15′07″S 36°53′02″W

- Municipality
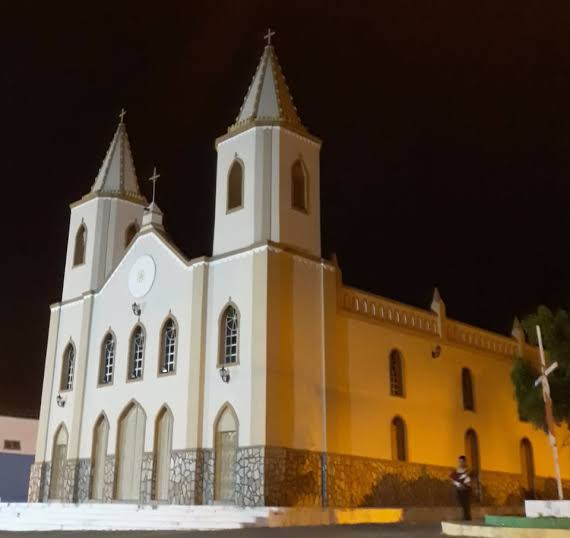
- São João Batista Church

- Flag Coat of arms
- Motto: "Incorruptibilis Semper" (Latin) "Forever Indestructible"

- Location within Brazil
- Country: Brazil
- State: Sergipe
- Founded: October 4, 1928
- Named after: John the Baptist

Government
  - Mayor: Neudo Alves (UNIÃO)

Area
  - Total: 83.711 km^{2} (32.321 sq mi)

Population (2022)
  - Total: 5,391
  - Density: 64.40/km^{2} (166.8/sq mi)
- Demonym: Cedrense
- Time zone: UTC−3 (BRT)
- Postal code: 49930-000
- Area code: +55 79
- 0.623 – medium: HDI (2010)
- Website: https://www.cedrodesaojoao.se.gov.br and https://www.camaradecedro.se.gov.br

Cedro de São João (Central northeastern Portuguese pronunciation: [ˈsɛdɾʊ ˈdi ˈsɐ̃w ˈʒɐ̃w]) is a municipality located in the Brazilian state of Sergipe. Its population was 5,391 (2022) and its area is about 84 km^{2} (32 sq mi). The municipality is the largest producer of carne-de-sol in Sergipe, in addition to stands out in cross-stitch embroidery and biscuits production.

== History ==
Cedro de São João was formed by romanis who came from Minas Gerais. After crossing Bahia and arriving in Sergipe, a small group separated and went to live in Capela, selling products from the Japaratuba Valley (sugar and honey) and the São Francisco Valley (rice, animals and fish).

The group used to buy animals from the Cemitério farm (today Aquidabã), and with these animals they settled in a place where today is the Jonas Trindade square, in Cedro de São João. When the São Francisco River flooded, the land surrounded by the waters formed almost an island. Since it was a safe place, the leader of the group, Antônio Nunes, built a corral with cedar wood abundant in the region (the tree that gave the municipality its name in Portuguese). In 1834 there were twenty mud houses built for the vaqueiros.

By Provincial Law of March 5, 1835, the owner of the farm, Antônio Nunes, created a school, which was later closed, and which reopened on July 9, 1872, under the direction of Carolina Leopoldina Regina de Sá. The construction of the chapel of São João Batista, the current main church, made the village independent from the Propriá parish of Santo Antônio.

In 1894, an organization was created to politically separate Cedro from Propriá. Three engenhos were established in the Jacaré Valley: Imbira, owned by Antônio Santana; Poço dos Bois, owned by Antônio Soares; and Lagoa Seca, owned by Antônio Baptista Nascimento, that contributed to the formation of the economic structure. The State Law No. 83, of October 23, 1894, elevated the village to the category of municipality.

On October 29, 1901, Cedro returned to the status of a village, by Law No. 422. Shortly after, a movement for the restoration of the municipality began, with the main leaders being Antônio Batista do Nascimento, João de Deus da Rocha, Manoel da Rocha and Antônio Santana.

The Law No. 1,015 of October 4, 1928, sanctioned by Sergipe Governor Manuel Correia Dantas, elevated Cedro to the category of municipality, separating it from Propriá, with the law coming into effect on January 1, 1929. By Decree-Law No. 533 of December 7, 1944, the municipality was renamed from "Cedro" to "Darcilena" because Mayor Miguel Seixas wanted to honor the First Lady of Brazil/Getúlio Vargas' wife, Darci Vargas, and the First Lady of Sergipe/Augusto Maynard Gomes' wife, Helena. It was changed to "Cedro de São João" on February 6, 1954, by State Law No. 554, and the village of São Francisco was incorporated into the area of the municipality. Later, in 1963, São Francisco was emancipated and became a municipality.

Currently, the villages of Bananeiras, Lagoa Nova, Poço dos Bois and São Sebastião (Carvãozinho) are part of the municipality. In the past, it had other villages that were transferred to São Francisco (Piçarreira) or abandoned, as was the cases of Cruzes, Cajueiros and Batinga, the latter had a railway station with the same name, but after the closure of the RFFSA railway lines, Batinga fell into decline.

=== Gypsy, Dutch and Marrano origins ===
The origins of the population of Cedro de São João are the subject of different historical and oral traditions. Local accounts have traditionally associated the settlement's early inhabitants with Gypsies, while other accounts have suggested the presence of Dutch settlers in the region following the period of Dutch rule in northeastern Brazil. Historian and anthropologist Felte Bezerra proposed that the population may have included descendants of Dutch settlers and Marranos, some of whom may have retained Jewish practices in secret.

Evidence of Dutch activity in the region also appears in the map of German cartographer Georg Marcgrave, dating from the first half of the 17th century. The map records the place-name Purupii, which historian Luís da Câmara Cascudo interpreted as referring to the Lagoa do Cedro, in the São Francisco region. The authors note this as evidence that the area was already known and mapped during the period of Dutch presence in northeastern Brazil.

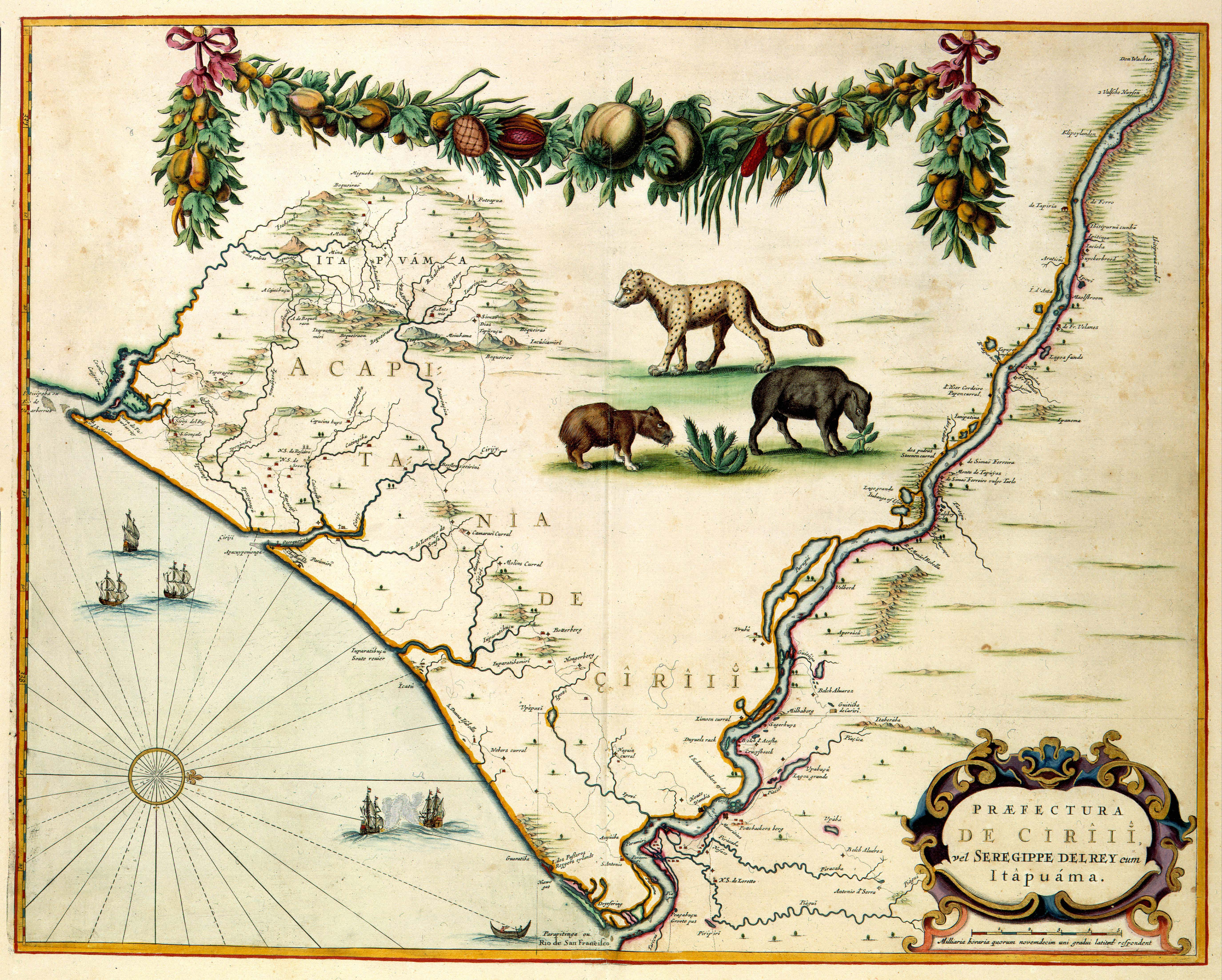
Map of Dutch Sergipe showing Lake Purupii (present-day Lagoa do Cedro) and Urubu (present-day Propriá)

Research by Marcos Silva and Isis Carolina Garcia Bispo has argued that elements of local culture may preserve traces of Crypto-Jewish ancestry. The authors identify several possible indicators, including the Sephardic surname Nunes, the place name Lagoa Salomé, the use of the Star of David on the façades of older houses, and local culinary traditions such as carne de sol and the sete capas biscuit. They also suggest that the term "Gypsy" may sometimes have been used as a cultural designation for itinerant traders rather than as an ethnic classification.

The authors relate these traditions to the history of Marranos, or converts to Christianity who secretly maintained elements of Jewish religious practice. Records of the Portuguese Inquisition document the presence of Marranos in colonial Sergipe, including individuals accused of practicing Judaism. Silva and Bispo emphasize that the cultural elements identified in Cedro de São João do not individually prove Crypto-Jewish ancestry, but argue that their combination constitutes evidence of a possible long-term Marrano cultural influence on the local population.

Historical Population
Year	Pop.	±%
1940	8,466	—
1950	8,668	+2.4%
1960	7,566	−12.7%
1970	5,470	−27.7%
1980	4,921	−10.0%
1991	5,122	+4.1%
2000	5,378	+5.0%
2010	5,633	+4.7%
2022	5,391	−4.3%

== Notable people ==
- João Batista Nunes de Oliveira
- Maria do Carmo Alves

== See also ==
- List of municipalities in Sergipe
