= Nossa Senhora de Lourdes =

Nossa Senhora de Lourdes may refer to:

- Nossa Senhora de Lourdes, Sergipe
- Nossa Senhora de Lourdes, Azores
- Nossa Senhora de Lourdes, Lajes do Pico
- Nossa Senhora de Lourdes, Santa Maria

== See also ==
- Nossa Senhora (disambiguation)
- Notre Dame de Lourdes (disambiguation)
