= Arthur Bispo do Rosário =

Brazilian artist

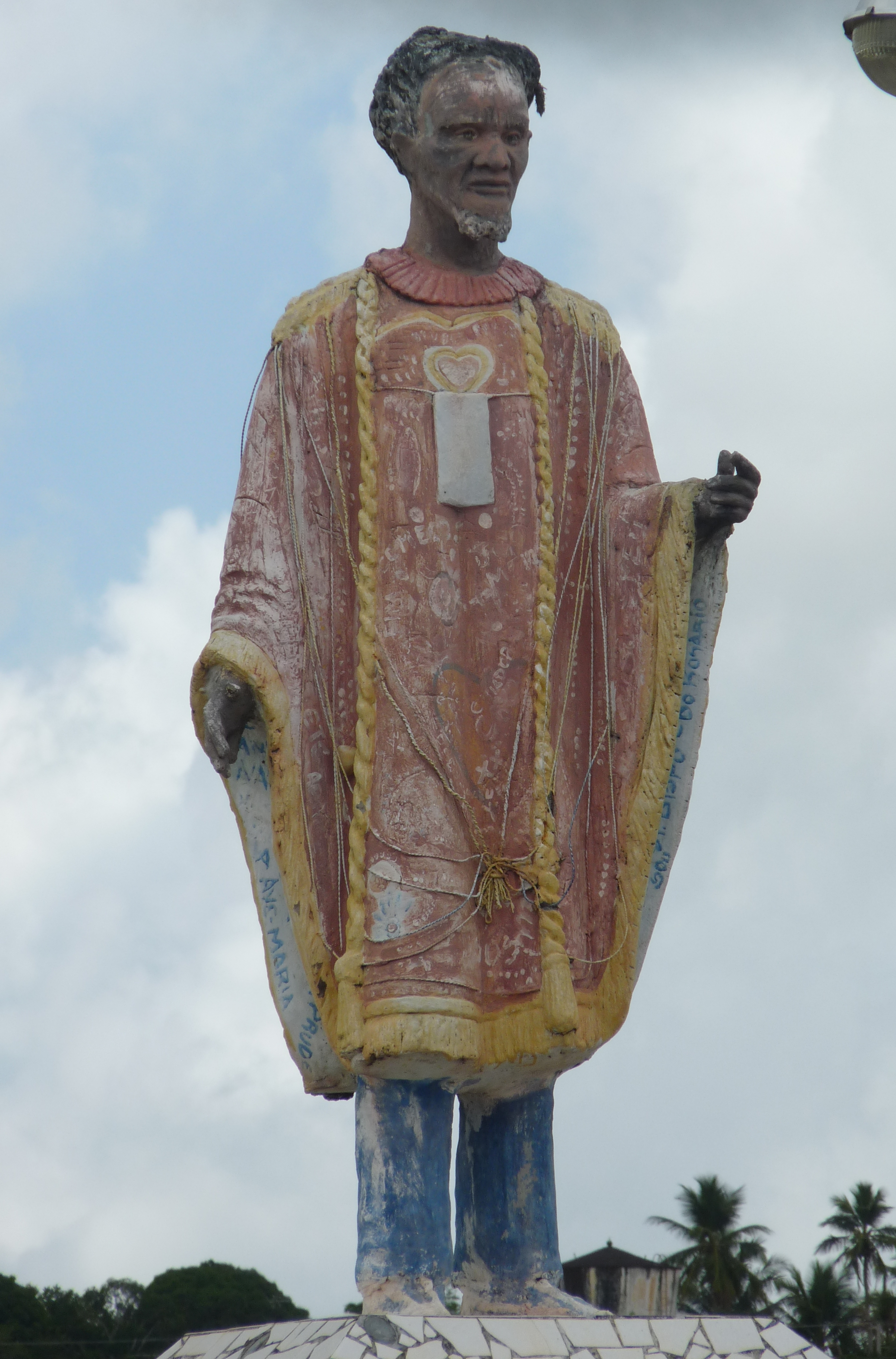
Statue of Arthur Bispo do Rosário, in Japaratuba, Sergipe, Brazil.

Arthur Bispo do Rosário (May 14, 1909 or March 16, 1911 – July 5, 1989) was a Brazilian outsider artist. Diagnosed with schizophrenia, he lived in a psychiatric institution in Rio de Janeiro for 50 years, where he created works of art with found objects, as part of a "divine mission". His works gained recognition among art critics when they were first displayed at the Venice Biennale in 1995.

== Biography ==
Born in Japaratuba, in the state of Sergipe, Bispo do Rosário joined the Navy in 1925 and later worked as a boxer and handyman. Between 1933 and 1937, he worked at the Light Department of Trams in the city of Rio de Janeiro and as a domestic worker for the Leoni family in the neighborhood of Botafogo.

On the night of December 22, 1938, Bispo do Rosário experienced hallucinations that led him to visit his employer, the lawyer Humberto Magalhães Leoni, to whom he said that he would present himself to the Candelária Church. After wandering the streets of Rio, he eventually headed to the Mosteiro de São Bento, where he announced to a group of monks that he was Jesus Christ, sent by God to be in charge of judging the living and the dead. Two days later he was arrested by police, recorded as an indigent and committed to the Hospício Pedro II, the first official mental institution in Brazil.

A month after his hospitalization, he was transferred to another mental institution, Colônia Juliano Moreira, located in the suburb of Jacarepaguá, under the diagnosis of "schizophrenic-paranoid." Here he received the patient number 01662, and was to remain for over 50 years.

During his stay at Colônia Juliano Moreira, Bispo do Rosário began to fashion works of art from different types of materials found around the institution. These works were intended to mark the passing of God on Earth and to represent the world, rather than as art for its own sake: his best known work is the Manto da Presentação (Presentation Cloak), which he intended to wear on the Day of Judgement. Bispo do Rosário said of his art "The voices tell me to do this way". Common themes in his work included ships (a recurring theme due to his relationship with the Navy in his youth), banners, and household objects.

Bispo do Rosário died on July 5, 1989, at the Colônia Juliano Moreira, after experiencing a heart attack. His work was later discovered and praised by art critics, who classified it as avant-garde and compared it to the ready-mades by Marcel Duchamp.

His life inspired a short story by psychiatrist and author Daniel Mason entitled ″A Registry of My Passage Upon the Earth″ published by Little, Brown and Company in 2020.
