= Raul (footballer, born 1985) =

Brazilian footballer

Personal information
- Full name: Raul Diogo Souza Rocha
- Date of birth: 9 November 1985 (age 41)
- Place of birth: Poço Verde, Brazil
- Height: 1.70 m (5 ft 7 in)
- Position: Left back

Team information
- Current team: Vitória da Conquista

Senior career*
Years	Team	Apps	(Gls)
2006–2010	Votoraty		
2007	→ Guarani (loan)		
2008	→ Oeste (loan)		
2009	→ Vitória da Conquista (loan)		
2010	Central	6	(2)
2011	Ferroviária	12	(0)
2012	Santo André	28	(0)
2013	Vitória da Conquista	14	(0)
2013–2015	Bahia	41	(0)
2014	→ América Mineiro (loan)	15	(0)
2015–2016	América Mineiro	17	(0)
2016	Atlético Goianiense	4	(0)
2017	Mirassol	14	(0)
2017	CSA	12	(0)
2018	Ituano	12	(0)
2018	→ Sampaio Corrêa (loan)	0	(0)
2020	Lagarto	5	(0)
2020	Villa Nova	3	(0)
2021–	Vitória da Conquista	1	(0)
- * Club domestic league appearances and goals as of 17:36, 17 March 2021 (UTC)

Raul Diogo Souza Rocha (born November 9, 1985, in Poço Verde), simply known as Raul, is a Brazilian footballer who plays as left back for Vitória da Conquista.

== Career ==
=== Lagarto ===
In December 2019, Raul signed with Lagarto Futebol Clube for the 2020 season. However, after five games for the club, it was reported on 12 February 2020 that he had left the club again.

== Career statistics ==
As of 7 February 2017

Club	Season	League			State League		Cup		Conmebol		Other		Total	
Club	Season	Division	Apps	Goals	Apps	Goals	Apps	Goals	Apps	Goals	Apps	Goals	Apps	Goals
Vitória da Conquista	2009	Baiano	—		15	0	—		—		—		15	0
Votoraty	2010	Paulista A2	—		2	0	0	0	—		—		2	0
Central	2010	Série C	6	2	—		—		—		—		6	2
Ferroviária	2011	Paulista A2	—		12	1	—		—		—		12	1
Santo André	2012	Série C	16	0	12	0	—		—		—		28	0
Vitória da Conquista	2013	Série C	—		14	0	2	0	—		—		16	0
Bahia	2013	Série A	34	0	—		—		3 (Note: All appearance(s) in Copa Sudamericana)	0	—		37	0
Bahia	2014	Série A	1	0	3	0	1	0	—		5 (Note: All appearance(s) in Copa do Nordeste)	0	10	0
Bahia	2015	Série B	—		3	0	—		—		1	0	4	0
Bahia	Subtotal		35	0	6	0	1	0	3	0	6	0	51	0
América–MG	2014	Série B	15	0	—		—		—		—		15	0
América–MG	2015	Série B	16	0	1	0	2	0	—		—		19	0
América–MG	Subtotal		31	0	1	0	2	0	—		—		34	0
Atlético Goianiense	2016	Série B	4	0	—		—		—		—		4	0
Mirassol	2017	Paulista	—		1	0	—		—		—		1	0
Career total			92	2	63	1	5	0	3	0	6	0	169	3
