= Guga (footballer, born 1977) =

Brazilian footballer

Personal information
- Full name: José Augusto Santana dos Santos
- Date of birth: 14 March 1977 (age 49)
- Place of birth: Rosário do Catete, Brazil
- Height: 1.80 m (5 ft 11 in)
- Position: Attacking midfielder

Senior career*
Years	Team	Apps	(Gls)
1996	Maruinense		
1997–1998	Lajeadense		
1998–2000	Gil Vicente	33	(10)
2000–2001	Belenenses	30	(8)
2001–2004	Vitória Guimarães	69	(8)
2004–2005	Boavista	25	(3)
2006–2007	AEL	19	(3)
2007–2010	Olhanense	47	(1)
Total		223	(33)
- * Club domestic league appearances and goals

José Augusto Santana dos Santos (born 14 March 1977 in Rosário do Catete, Sergipe), commonly known as Guga, is a Brazilian retired footballer who played as an attacking midfielder.

He spent most of his professional career in Portugal, representing five clubs over the course of eight Primeira Liga seasons (11 years in total).
