= Feira Nova =

Feira Nova may refer to:

- Feira Nova, Pernambuco, a city in Pernambuco, Brazil
- Feira Nova, Sergipe, a city in Sergipe, Brazil
- Feira Nova Hipermercados, a Portuguese supermarket chain operated by Grupo Jerónimo Martins
