= Aquidaba =

Aquidaba or Aquidabã may refer to:

- Aquidabã, Sergipe, Brazil
- Aquidabã River (disambiguation)
- Brazilian battleship Aquidabã

== See also ==
- Aquidaban (disambiguation)
