= Malhada dos Bois =

Municipality in Sergipe, Brazil

Coordinates: 10°20′56″S 36°55′26″W

- Municipality
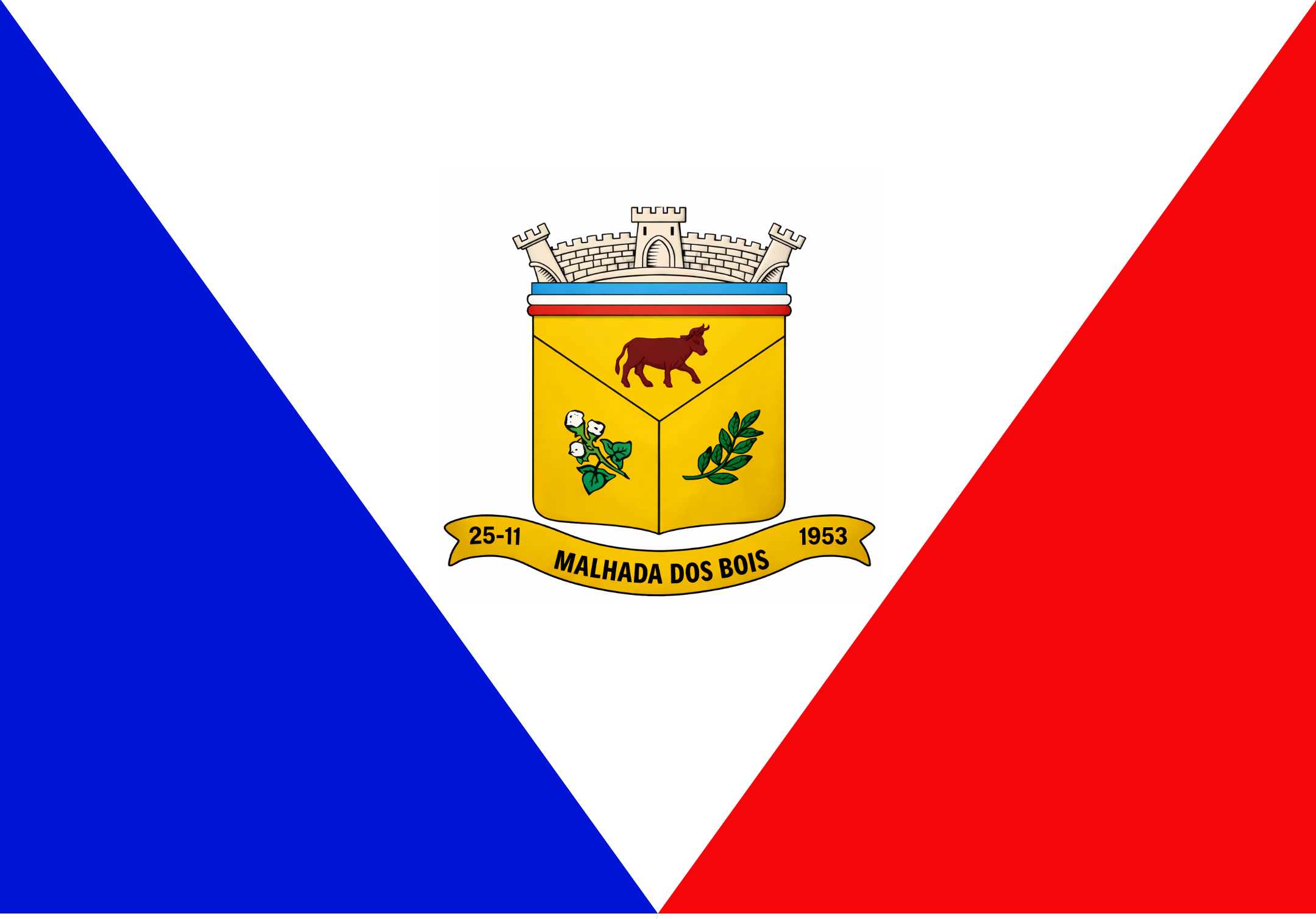
- Flag Coat of arms
- Interactive map of Malhada dos Bois
- Country: Brazil
- Time zone: UTC−3 (BRT)

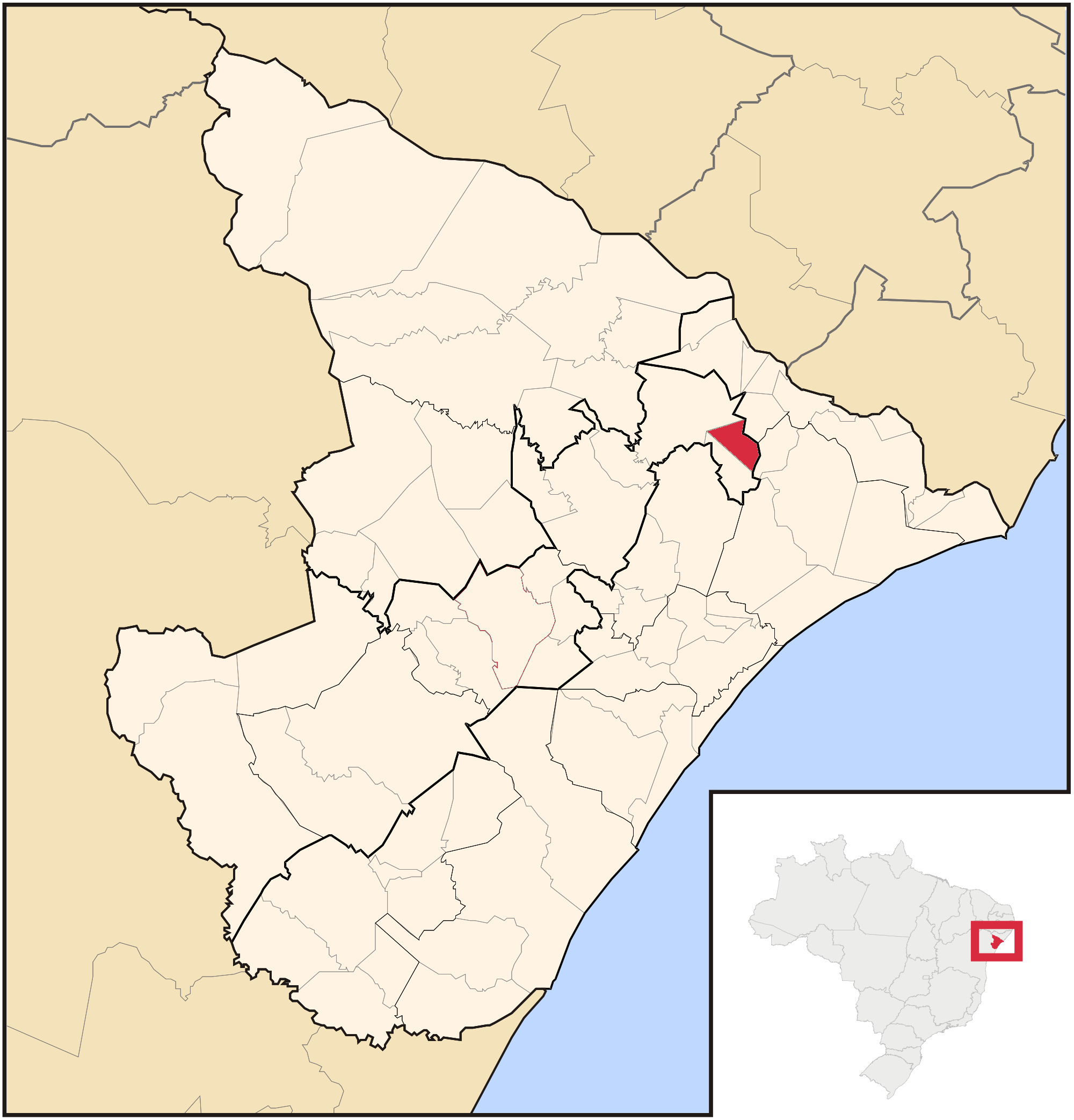
Location of Malhada dos Bois in Sergipe

Malhada dos Bois (Brazilian Portuguese pronunciation: [mɐˈʎadɐ ˈdʊs ˈbojs], alternatively mɐjˈadɐ ˈdʊɦ ˈboj) is a municipality located in the Brazilian state of Sergipe. Its population was 3,699 (2020) and its area is 62 km^{2} (24 sq mi).

== See also ==
- List of municipalities in Sergipe
