= Aquidabã River =

There are two rivers named Aquidabã River.

Brazil

- Aquidabã River (Mato Grosso do Sul)
- Aquidabã River (Paraná)

== See also ==
- Aquidabán River, Paraguay
- Aquidaba (disambiguation)
