= Cumbe =

Municipality in Sergipe, Brazil

Coordinates: 10°21′18″S 37°10′58″W

- Municipality
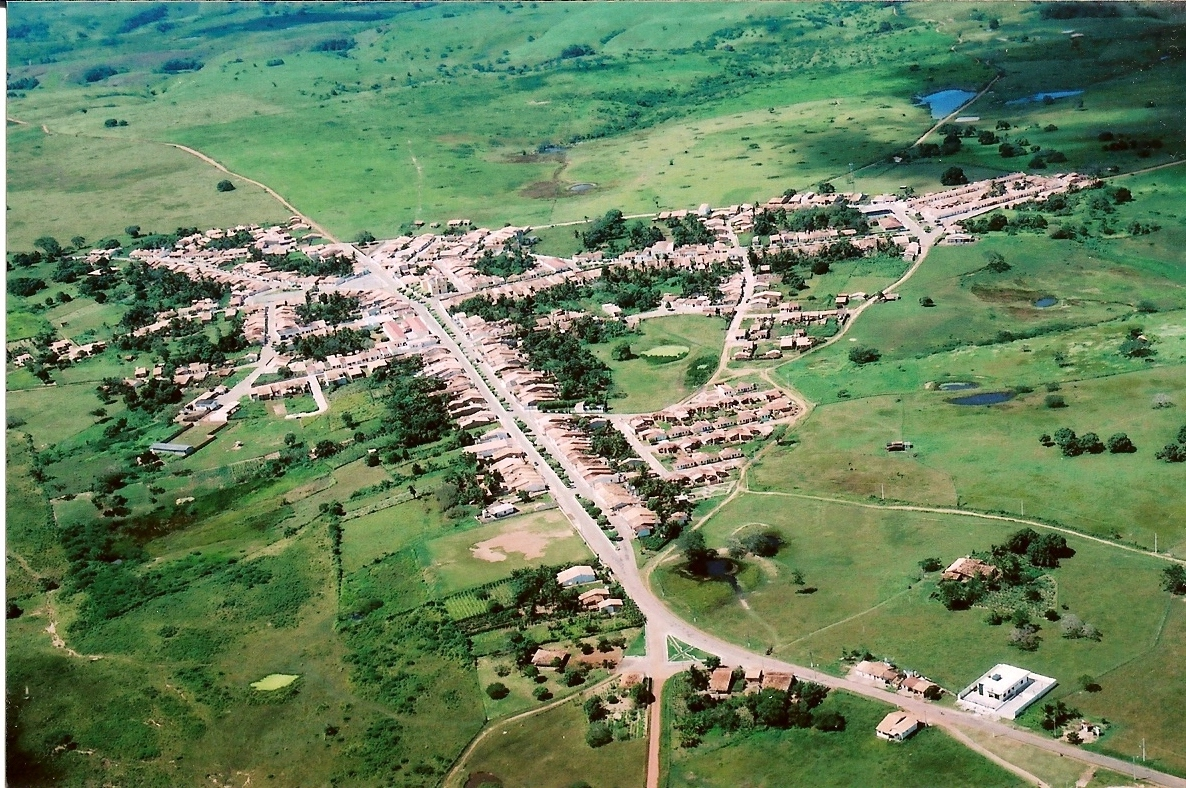
- Overview of the municipality

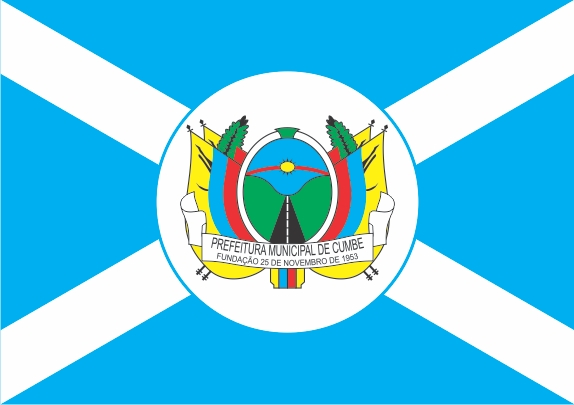
- Flag Coat of arms
- Interactive map of Cumbe
- Country: Brazil
- Time zone: UTC−3 (BRT)

Cumbe (Brazilian Portuguese pronunciation: [ˈkũbi]) is a municipality located in the Brazilian state of Sergipe. Its population was 3,998 (2020) and its area is 129 km^{2} (50 sq mi).

== See also ==
- Combe
- List of municipalities in Sergipe
