= Aquidaban =

Aquidaban or Aquidabán may refer to:

- Brazilian battleship Aquidaban, see Brazilian battleship Aquidabã
- Aquidabán River in Paraguay

== See also ==
- Aquidaba (disambiguation)
