= São Miguel do Aleixo =

Municipality in Sergipe, Brazil

Coordinates: 10°23′16″S 37°22′51″W

- Municipality
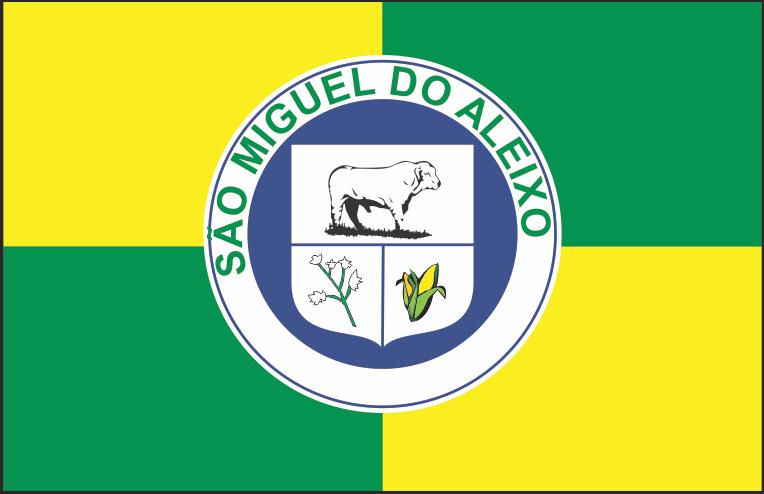
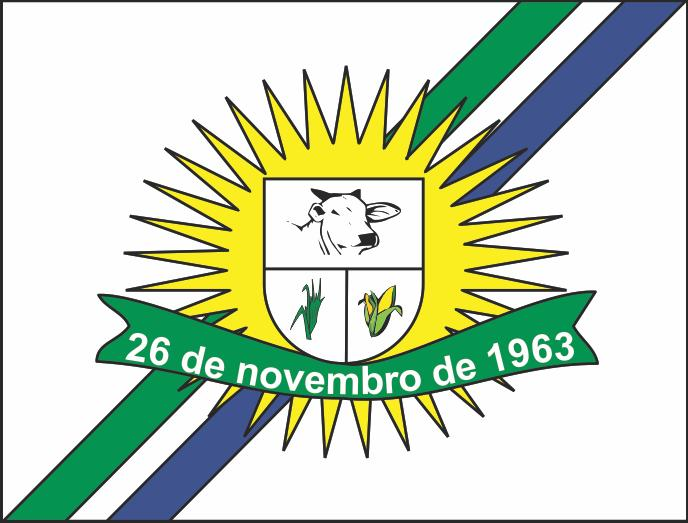
- Flag Coat of arms
- Interactive map of São Miguel do Aleixo
- Country: Brazil
- Time zone: UTC−3 (BRT)

São Miguel do Aleixo (Brazilian Portuguese pronunciation: [ˈsɐ̃w miˈɡɛw ˈdʊ ɐˈleʃʊ]) is a municipality located in the Brazilian state of Sergipe. Its population was 3,947 (2020) and its area is 145 km^{2} (56 sq mi).

== See also ==
- List of municipalities in Sergipe
