= Tomar do Geru =

Municipality in Sergipe, Brazil

Tomar do Geru Município de Tomar do Geru
- Municipality
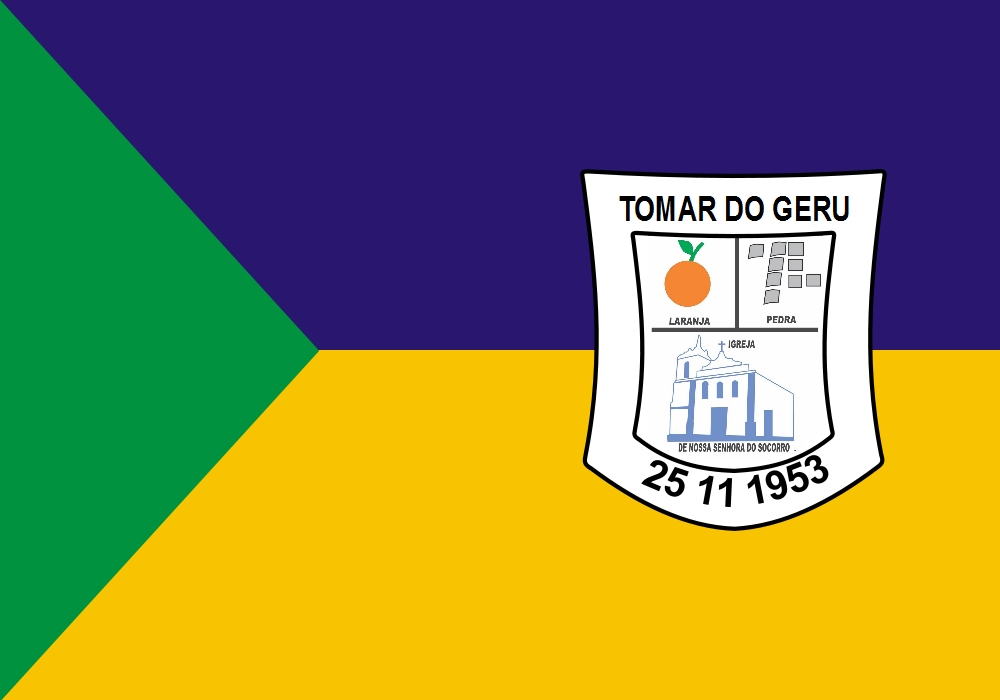
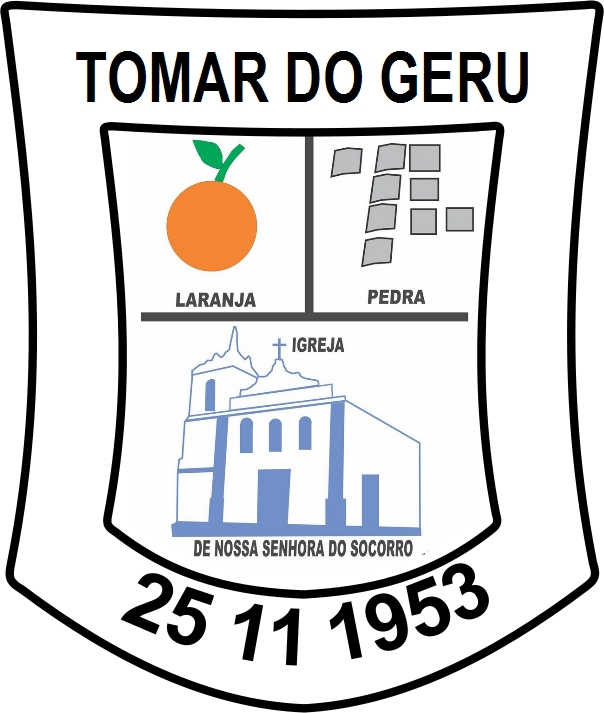
- Flag Coat of arms

- Location of Tomar do Geru in Brazil
- Coordinates: 11°22′22″S 37°50′27″W
- Country: Brazil
- Region: Northeast
- State: Sergipe
- Founded: November 25, 1953

Government
  - Mayor: Augusto Soares Diniz

Area
  - Total: 305 km^{2} (118 sq mi)
- Elevation: 170 m (560 ft)

Population (2020)
  - Total: 13,535
  - Density: 44.4/km^{2} (115/sq mi)
- Demonym: Geruense
- Time zone: UTC−3 (BRT)
- Website: tomardogeru.se.io.org.br

Tomar do Geru (Brazilian Portuguese pronunciation: [tõˈmɐ ˈdʊ ʒeˈɾu]) is a municipality located in the Brazilian state of Sergipe. Its population was 13,535 (2020) and it covers 305 km^{2} (118 mi^{2}). Tomar do Geru has a population density of 43 inhabitants per square kilometer. It is located 131 km (81 mi) from the state capital of Sergipe, Aracaju. The Church of Nossa Senhora do Socorro was built by the Society of Jesus in 1688. It was listed as a historic structure by the Brazilian National Institute of Historic and Artistic Heritage (IPHAN) in 1943.

== See also ==
- List of municipalities in Sergipe
