= Monte Alegre de Sergipe =

Municipality in Sergipe, Brazil

Monte Alegre de Sergipe Município de Monte Alegre de Sergipe
- Municipality
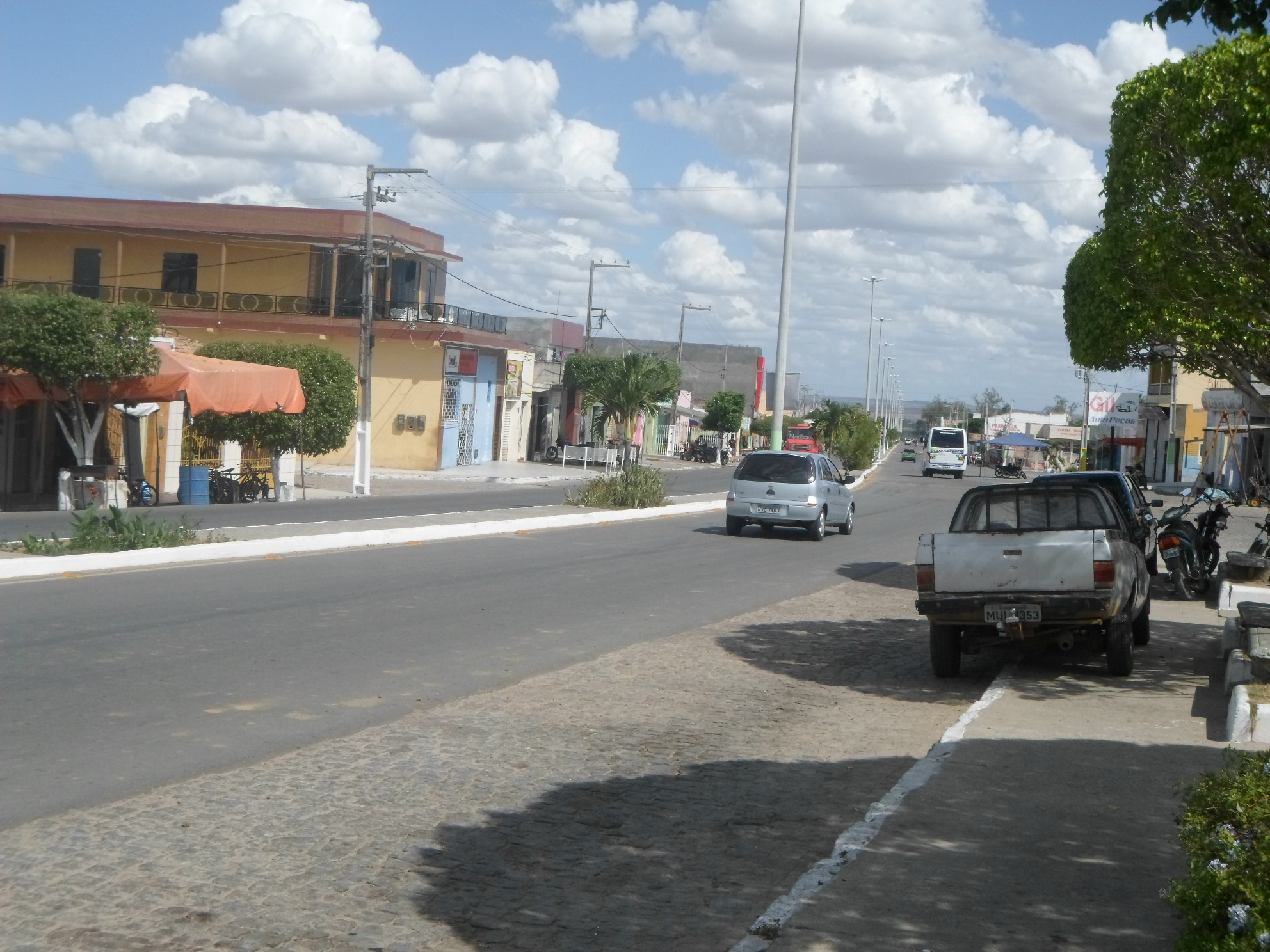
- Avenida Manoel Elígio da Mota, Monte Alegre de Sergipe

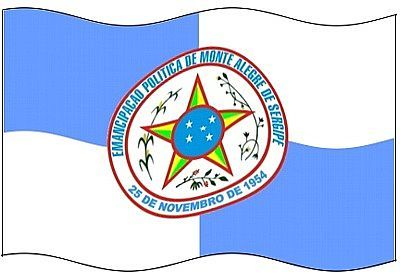
- Flag

- Location of Monte Alegre de Sergipe in Sergipe

- Location of Monte Alegre de Sergipe in Brazil
- Coordinates: 10°01′37″S 37°33′43″W
- Country: Brazil
- Region: Northeast
- State: Sergipe
- Founded: November 25, 1953

Government
  - Mayor: Antônio Fernandes Rodrigues Santos

Area
  - Total: 407 km^{2} (157 sq mi)
- Elevation: 265 m (869 ft)

Population (2020)
  - Total: 15,175
  - Density: 37.3/km^{2} (96.6/sq mi)
- Demonym: Monte-alegrense
- Time zone: UTC−3 (BRT)
- Website: montealegre.se.gov.br

Monte Alegre de Sergipe (Brazilian Portuguese: [ˈmõtʃi aˈlɛɡɾi dʒi seʁˈʒipi]) is a municipality located in the Brazilian state of Sergipe. Its population was 15,175 (2020). Monte Alegre de Sergipe covers 407 km^{2} (157 mi^{2}) with a population density of 37 inhabitants per square kilometer.

== See also ==
- List of municipalities in Sergipe
