= Riachão do Dantas =

Municipality in Sergipe, Brazil

Coordinates: 11°04′08″S 37°43′30″W

- Municipality
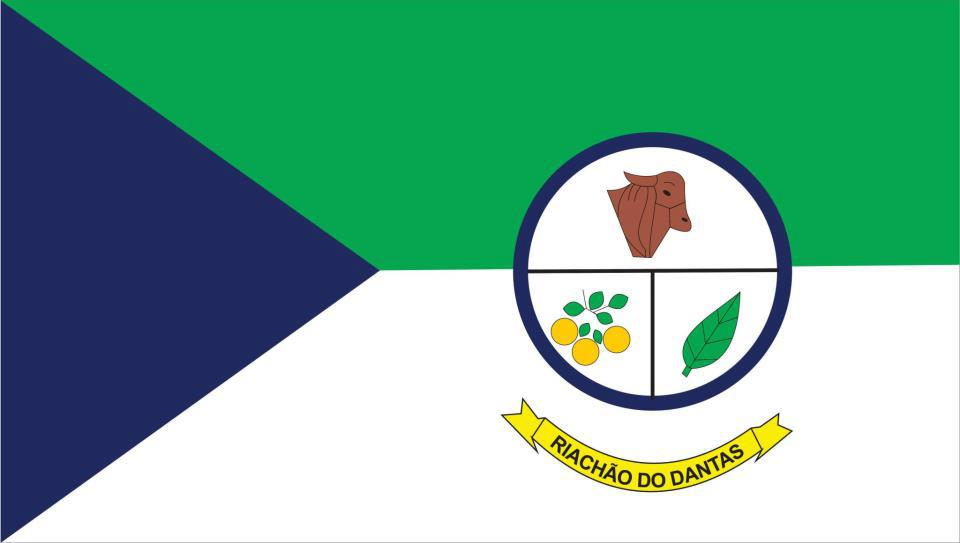
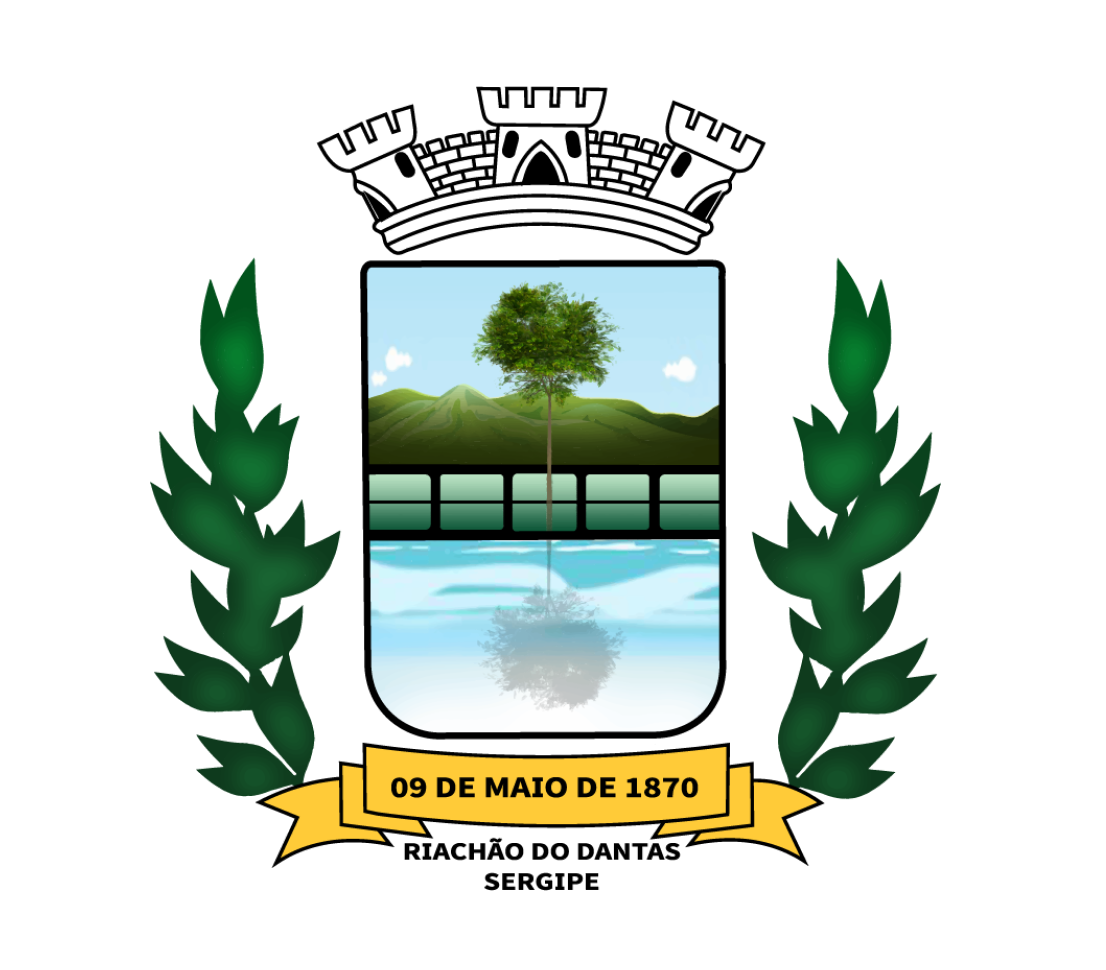
- Flag Coat of arms
- Interactive map of Riachão do Dantas
- Country: Brazil
- Time zone: UTC−3 (BRT)

Riachão do Dantas (Brazilian Portuguese: [ʁi.aˈʃɐ̃w du ˈdɐ̃tɐs]) is a municipality located in the Brazilian state of Sergipe. Its population was 19,809 (2020) and its area is 528 km^{2} (204 sq mi).

== See also ==
- List of municipalities in Sergipe
