= List of municipalities in Sergipe =

This is a list of the municipalities in the state of Sergipe (SE), located in the Northeast Region of Brazil. Sergipe is divided into 75 municipalities, which are grouped into 13 microregions, which are grouped into 3 mesoregions.

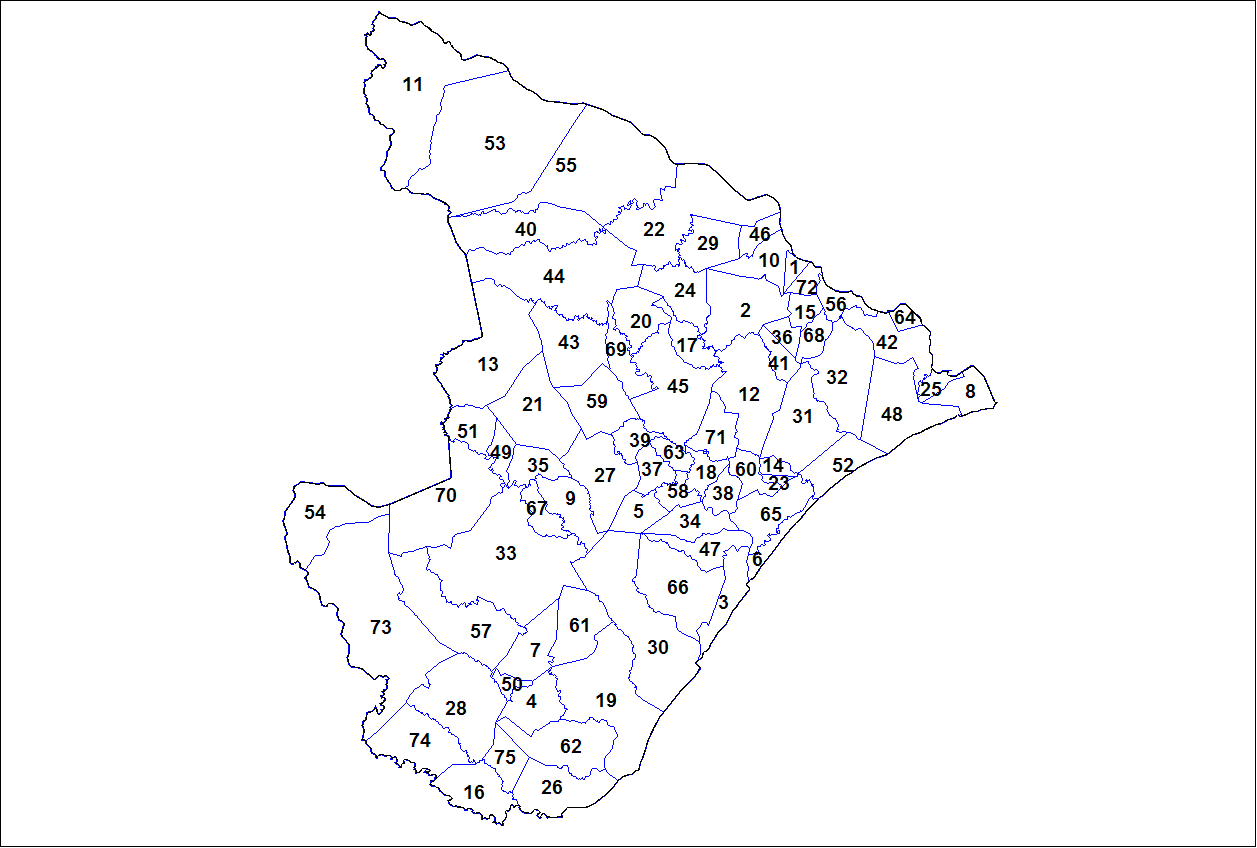
Municipalities of Sergipe, Brazil

Mesoregion	Microregion	#	Municipality
Agreste Sergipano	Agreste de Itabaiana	5	Areia Branca
Agreste Sergipano	Agreste de Itabaiana	9	Campo do Brito
Agreste Sergipano	Agreste de Itabaiana	27	Itabaiana
Agreste Sergipano	Agreste de Itabaiana	35	Macambira
Agreste Sergipano	Agreste de Itabaiana	37	Malhador
Agreste Sergipano	Agreste de Itabaiana	39	Moita Bonita
Agreste Sergipano	Agreste de Itabaiana	67	São Domingos
Agreste Sergipano	Agreste de Lagarto	33	Lagarto
Agreste Sergipano	Agreste de Lagarto	57	Riachão do Dantas
Agreste Sergipano	Nossa Senhora das Dores	2	Aquidabã
Agreste Sergipano	Nossa Senhora das Dores	17	Cumbe
Agreste Sergipano	Nossa Senhora das Dores	36	Malhada dos Bois
Agreste Sergipano	Nossa Senhora das Dores	41	Muribeca
Agreste Sergipano	Nossa Senhora das Dores	45	Nossa Senhora das Dores
Agreste Sergipano	Nossa Senhora das Dores	69	São Miguel do Aleixo
Agreste Sergipano	Tobias Barreto	54	Poço Verde
Agreste Sergipano	Tobias Barreto	70	Simão Dias
Agreste Sergipano	Tobias Barreto	73	Tobias Barreto
Leste Sergipano	Aracaju	3	Aracaju (State Capital)
Leste Sergipano	Aracaju	6	Barra dos Coqueiros
Leste Sergipano	Aracaju	47	Nossa Senhora do Socorro
Leste Sergipano	Aracaju	66	São Cristóvão
Leste Sergipano	Baixo Cotinguibá	14	Carmópolis
Leste Sergipano	Baixo Cotinguibá	23	General Maynard
Leste Sergipano	Baixo Cotinguibá	34	Laranjeiras
Leste Sergipano	Baixo Cotinguibá	38	Maruim
Leste Sergipano	Baixo Cotinguibá	58	Riachuelo
Leste Sergipano	Baixo Cotinguibá	60	Rosário do Catete
Leste Sergipano	Baixo Cotinguibá	65	Santo Amaro das Brotas
Leste Sergipano	Boquim	4	Arauá
Leste Sergipano	Boquim	7	Boquim
Leste Sergipano	Boquim	16	Cristinápolis
Leste Sergipano	Boquim	28	Itabaianinha
Leste Sergipano	Boquim	50	Pedrinhas
Leste Sergipano	Boquim	61	Salgado
Leste Sergipano	Boquim	74	Tomar do Geru
Leste Sergipano	Boquim	75	Umbaúba
Leste Sergipano	Cotinguibá	12	Capela
Leste Sergipano	Cotinguibá	18	Divina Pastora
Leste Sergipano	Cotinguibá	63	Santa Rosa de Lima
Leste Sergipano	Cotinguibá	71	Siriri
Leste Sergipano	Estância	19	Estância
Leste Sergipano	Estância	26	Indiaroba
Leste Sergipano	Estância	30	Itaporanga d'Ajuda
Leste Sergipano	Estância	62	Santa Luzia do Itanhy
Leste Sergipano	Japaratuba	31	Japaratuba
Leste Sergipano	Japaratuba	32	Japoatã
Leste Sergipano	Japaratuba	48	Pacatuba
Leste Sergipano	Japaratuba	52	Pirambu
Leste Sergipano	Japaratuba	68	São Francisco
Leste Sergipano	Propriá	1	Amparo de São Francisco
Leste Sergipano	Propriá	8	Brejo Grande
Leste Sergipano	Propriá	10	Canhoba
Leste Sergipano	Propriá	15	Cedro de São João
Leste Sergipano	Propriá	25	Ilha das Flores
Leste Sergipano	Propriá	42	Neópolis
Leste Sergipano	Propriá	46	Nossa Senhora de Lourdes
Leste Sergipano	Propriá	56	Propriá
Leste Sergipano	Propriá	64	Santana do São Francisco
Leste Sergipano	Propriá	72	Telha
Sertão Sergipano	Carira	13	Carira
Sertão Sergipano	Carira	21	Frei Paulo
Sertão Sergipano	Carira	43	Nossa Senhora Aparecida
Sertão Sergipano	Carira	49	Pedra Mole
Sertão Sergipano	Carira	51	Pinhão
Sertão Sergipano	Carira	59	Ribeirópolis
Sertão Sergipano	Sergipana do Sertão do São Francisco	11	Canindé de São Francisco
Sertão Sergipano	Sergipana do Sertão do São Francisco	20	Feira Nova
Sertão Sergipano	Sergipana do Sertão do São Francisco	22	Gararu
Sertão Sergipano	Sergipana do Sertão do São Francisco	24	Gracho Cardoso
Sertão Sergipano	Sergipana do Sertão do São Francisco	29	Itabi
Sertão Sergipano	Sergipana do Sertão do São Francisco	40	Monte Alegre de Sergipe
Sertão Sergipano	Sergipana do Sertão do São Francisco	44	Nossa Senhora da Glória
Sertão Sergipano	Sergipana do Sertão do São Francisco	53	Poço Redondo
Sertão Sergipano	Sergipana do Sertão do São Francisco	55	Porto da Folha

== See also ==
- Geography of Brazil
- List of cities in Brazil
