= Pedrinhas =

Municipality in Sergipe, Brazil

- Municipality
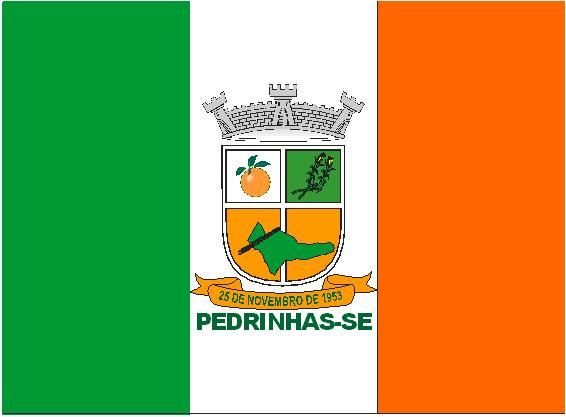
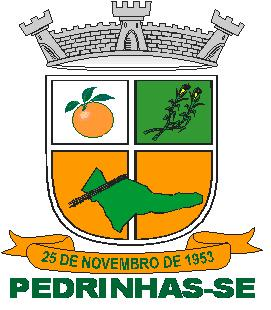
- Flag Coat of arms

- Location in Brazil
- Coordinates: 11°11′31″S 37°40′26″W
- Country: Brazil
- Region: Northeast
- State: Sergipe

Area
  - Total: 33.14 km^{2} (12.80 sq mi)
- Elevation: 165 m (541 ft)

Population (2020)
  - Total: 9,665
  - Density: 291.6/km^{2} (755.3/sq mi)
- Time zone: UTC−3 (BRT)

Pedrinhas (Brazilian Portuguese pronunciation: [pɛˈdɾij̃ɐs]) is a municipality in the state of Sergipe in Brazil. Its area is 33.144 km^{2} (12.797 sq mi), and its population is 9,665 inhabitants (2020 estimate). It has an elevation of 165 m.

== See also ==
- List of municipalities in Sergipe
