= Notre Dame de Lourdes =

Notre Dame de Lourdes (or Notre-Dame-de-Lourdes) is French for "Our Lady of Lourdes", which refers to the Marian apparition that is reported to have appeared before various individuals in separate occasions around Lourdes, France.

It may also refer to:

== Places ==
=== Canada ===
- Notre-Dame-de-Lourdes, Manitoba
- Notre-Dame-de-Lourdes, New Brunswick
- Notre-Dame-de-Lourdes, Centre-du-Québec, Quebec
- Notre-Dame-de-Lourdes, Lanaudière, Quebec
- Notre-Dame-de-Lourdes-de-Lorrainville, a community in Lorrainville, Quebec

== Institutions ==
- Hospitalité Notre Dame de Lourdes, a Roman Catholic religious confraternity
- Collège Notre-Dame-de-Lourdes, an education facility located in Longueuil, Quebec, Canada

== See also ==
- Notre Dame (disambiguation)
- Nossa Senhora de Lourdes (disambiguation)
