= Itabi =

Municipality in Sergipe, Brazil

Itabi Município de Itabi
- Municipality
- Flag Coat of arms

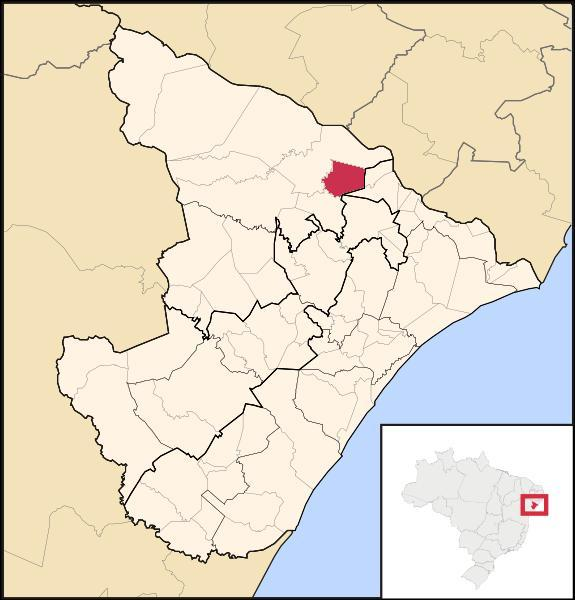
- Location of Itabi in Sergipe

- Location of Itabi in Brazil
- Coordinates: 10°07′33″S 37°06′10″W
- Country: Brazil
- Region: Northeast
- State: Sergipe
- Founded: November 25, 1953

Government
  - Mayor: Rubens Feitosa Melo

Area
  - Total: 184.4 km^{2} (71.2 sq mi)
- Elevation: 172 m (564 ft)

Population (2020)
  - Total: 4,886
  - Density: 26.50/km^{2} (68.63/sq mi)
- Demonym: Itabiense
- Time zone: UTC−3 (BRT)

Itabi (Central northeastern portuguese pronunciation: [itaˈbi]) is a municipality located in the Brazilian state of Sergipe. In 2020, its population was 4,886. Its area is 184.4 km^{2} (71.2 mi^{2}) and has a population density of 27 inhabitants per square kilometer.

== See also ==
- List of municipalities in Sergipe
