= Siriri =

Municipality in Sergipe, Brazil

Coordinates: 10°36′14″S 37°06′46″W

- Municipality
- Flag Coat of arms
- Interactive map of Siriri
- Country: Brazil
- Time zone: UTC−3 (BRT)

Siriri (Brazilian Portuguese pronunciation: [siɾiˈɾi]) is a municipality located in the Brazilian state of Sergipe. Its population was 8,970 (2020) and its area is 169 km^{2} (65 sq mi).

== See also ==
- List of municipalities in Sergipe
