= Arauá =

Municipality in Sergipe, Brazil

Coordinates: 11°15′43″S 37°37′12″W

- Municipality
- Municipality of Arauá
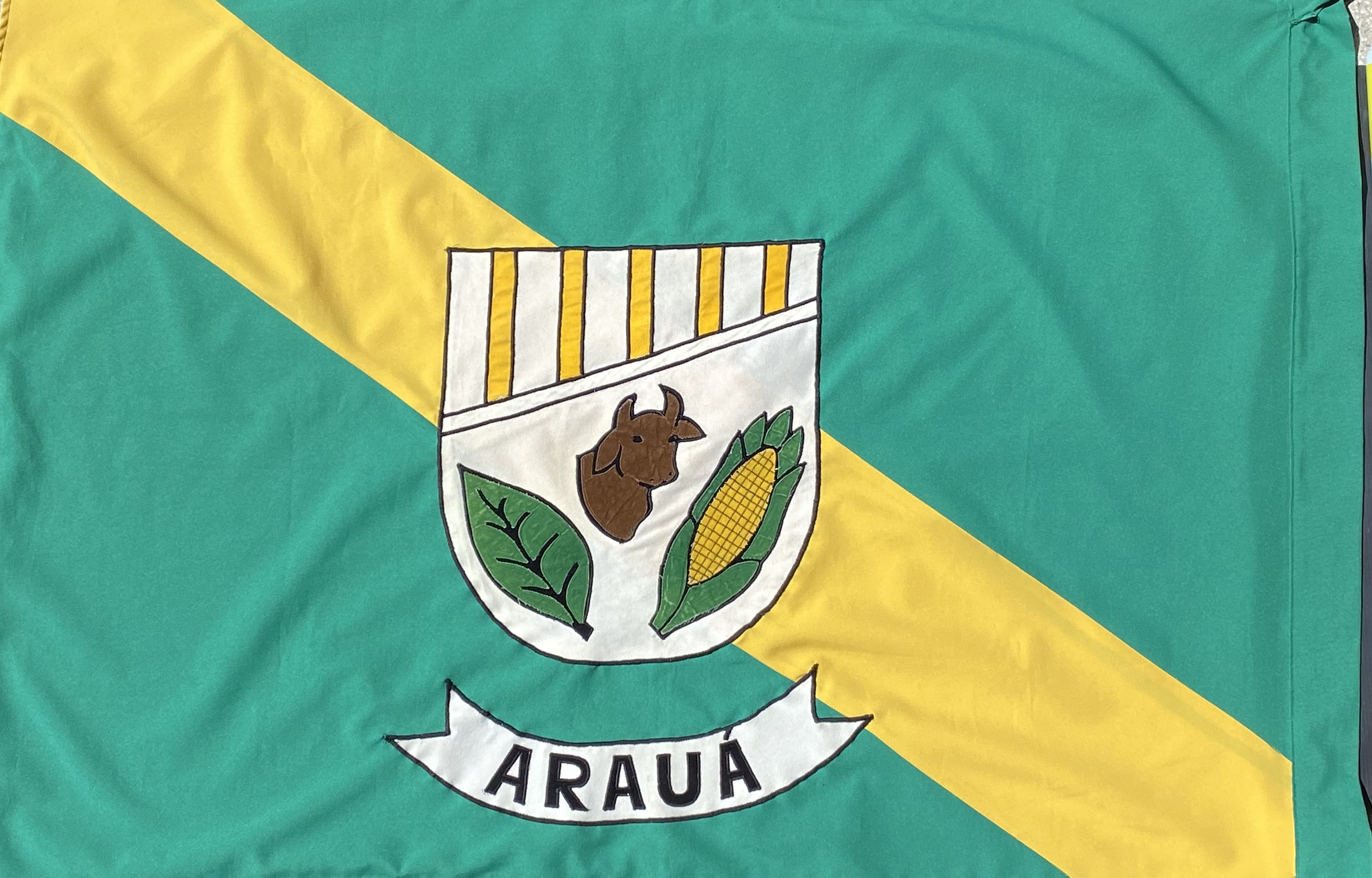
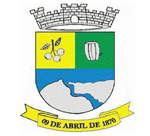
- Flag Coat of arms

- Location of Arauá in Sergipe
- Country: Brazil
- Region: Northeast
- State: Sergipe
- Founded: 9 April 1870

Government
  - Mayor: Fabio Manoel Andrade Costa

Area
  - Total: 192.723 km^{2} (74.411 sq mi)
- Elevation: 86 m (282 ft)

Population (2020)
  - Total: 9,947
  - Density: 51.61/km^{2} (133.7/sq mi)
- Time zone: UTC−3
- Website: amparodosaofrancisco.se.gov.br

Arauá (Brazilian Portuguese pronunciation: [ɐɾɐˈwɐ]) is a municipality located in the Brazilian state of Sergipe. Its population was 9,947 (2020) and its area is 193 km^{2} (75 sq mi).

== See also ==
- List of municipalities in Sergipe
