= Brejo Grande =

Municipality in Sergipe, Brazil

- Municipality
- The Municipality of Brejo Grande
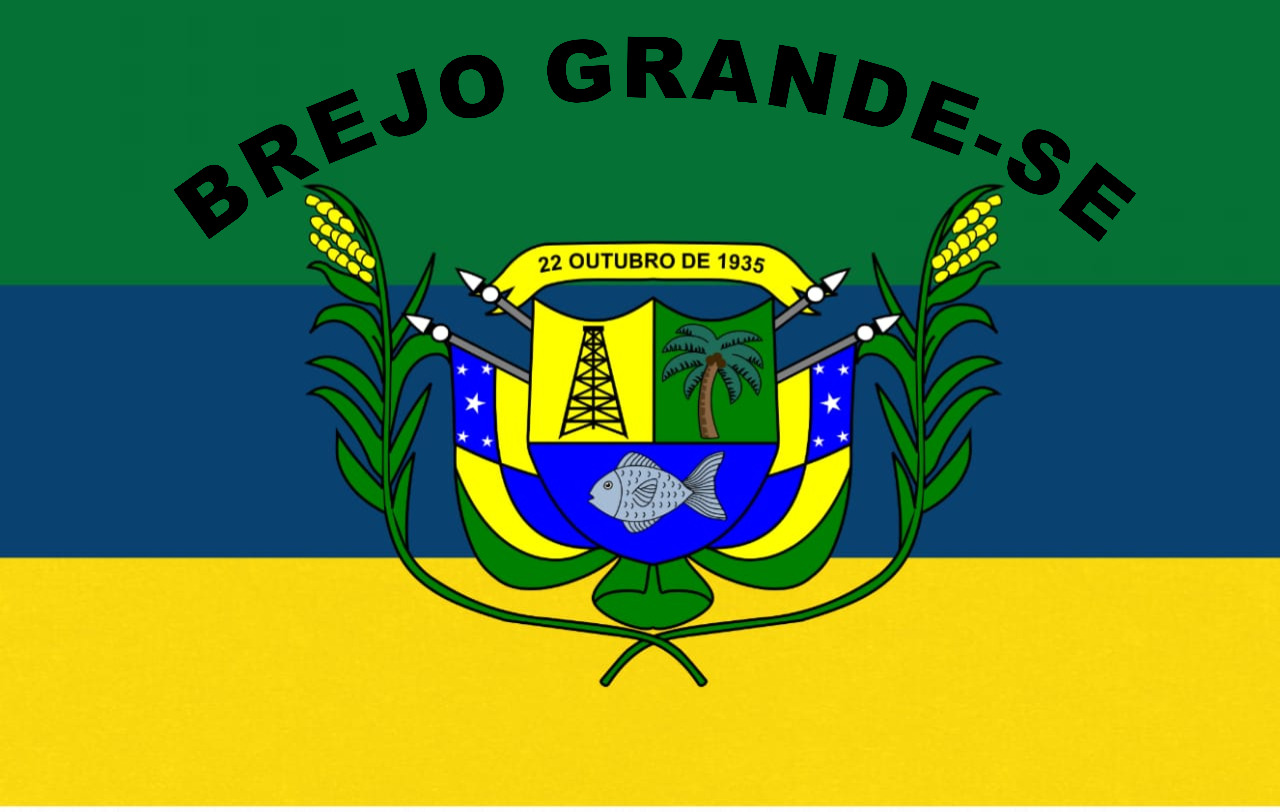
- Flag Coat of arms

- Location of Brejo Grande in the State of Sergipe
- Coordinates: 11°15′43″S 37°37′12″W
- Country: Brazil
- Region: Northeast
- State: Sergipe
- Founded: October 2, 1926

Government
  - Mayor: Carlos Augusto Ferreira (PR)

Area
  - Total: 143.9 km^{2} (55.6 sq mi)
- Elevation: 30 m (98 ft)

Population (2020)
  - Total: 8,353
  - Density: 52.01/km^{2} (134.7/sq mi)
- Time zone: UTC−3 (BRT)
- HDI (2000): 0.550 – medium

Brejo Grande (Central northeastern portuguese pronunciation: [ˈbɾɛʒʊ ˈɡɾɐ̃di]) is the easternmost municipality in the Brazilian state of Sergipe. Its population was 8,353 (2020) and its area is 143.9 km^{2} (55.6 sq mi).

== See also ==
- List of municipalities in Sergipe
