= Amparo de São Francisco =

Municipality in Sergipe, Brazil

Coordinates: 10°08′02″S 36°55′48″W

- Municipality
- Municipality of Amparo de São Francisco
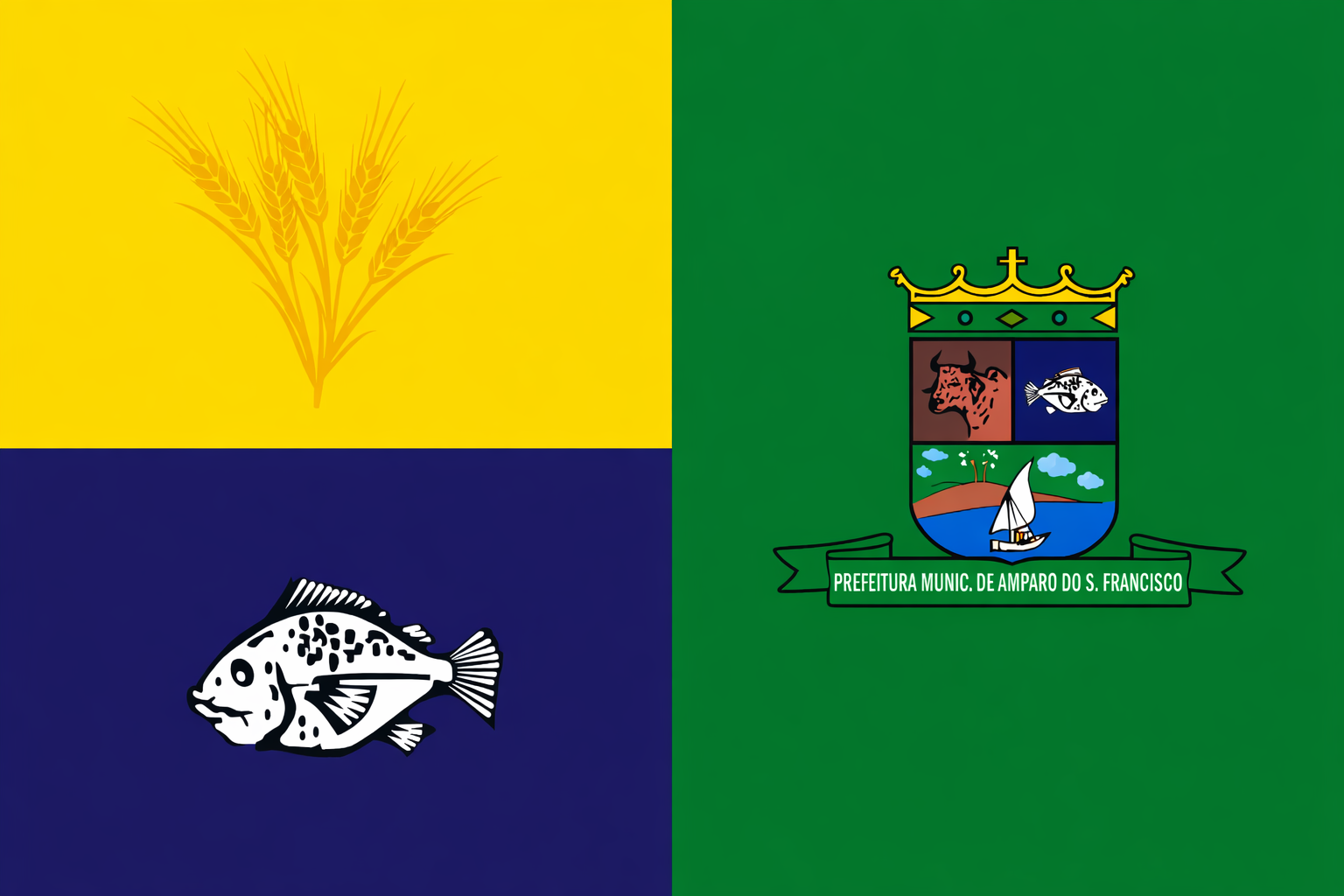
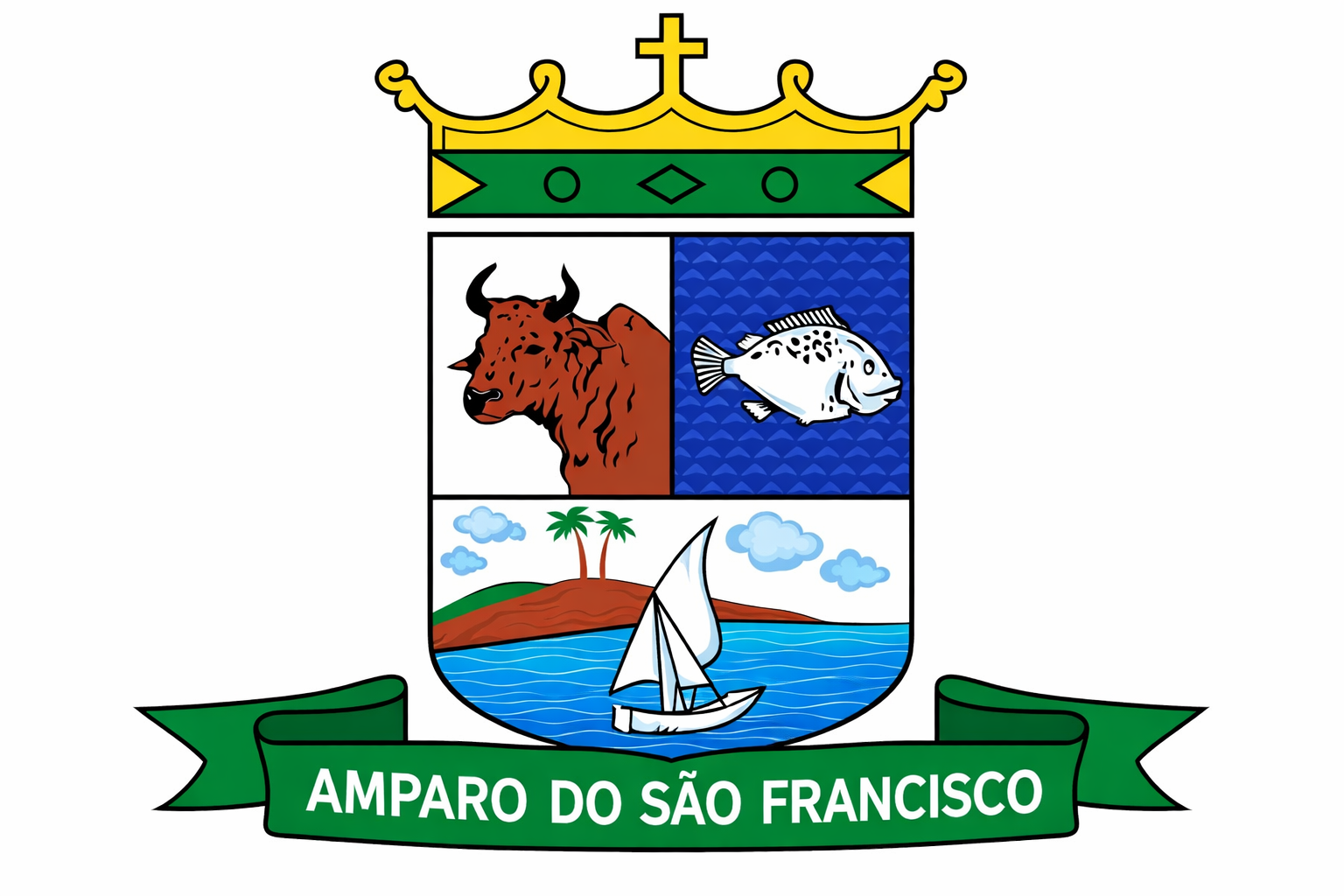
- Flag Coat of arms

- Location of Amparo de Saõ Francisco in Sergipe
- Country: Brazil
- Region: Northeast
- State: Sergipe
- Founded: 25 November 1952

Government
  - Mayor: Franklin Ramires Freire (PSC)

Area
  - Total: 35.330 km^{2} (13.641 sq mi)
- Elevation: 51 m (167 ft)

Population (2020)
  - Total: 2,380
  - Density: 67.4/km^{2} (174/sq mi)
- Time zone: UTC−3
- Website: amparodosaofrancisco.se.gov.br

Amparo de São Francisco (Brazilian Portuguese pronunciation: [ɐ̃ˈpaɾʊ ˈdi ˈsɐ̃w fɾɐ̃ˈsiskʊ]) is a municipality located in the Brazilian state of Sergipe. Its population was 2,380 (2020) and its area is 35 km^{2} (14 sq mi).

== See also ==
- List of municipalities in Sergipe
