= Nossa Senhora da Glória, Sergipe =

Municipality in Sergipe, Brazil

Nossa Senhora da Glória Município de Nossa Senhora da Glória
- Municipality
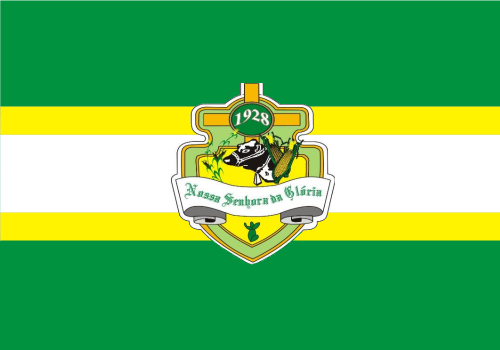
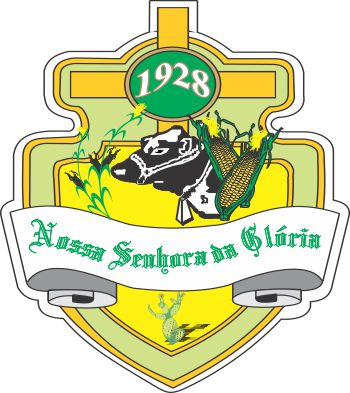
- Flag Coat of arms
- Nickname: "Capital of the Sertão"
- Motto: Com a força da nossa gente
- Location of Nossa Senhora da Glória in Brazil
- Coordinates: 10°13′04″S 37°25′12″W
- Country: Brazil
- Region: Northeast
- State: Sergipe
- Founded: September 26, 1928

Government
  - Mayor: Luana Michele de Oliveira Silva Cacho

Area
  - Total: 757.45 km^{2} (292.45 sq mi)
- Elevation: 291 m (955 ft)

Population (2020)
  - Total: 37,324
  - Density: 49.276/km^{2} (127.62/sq mi)
- Demonym: Gloriense
- Time zone: UTC−3 (BRT)
- Website: gloria.se.gov.br

Nossa Senhora da Glória (Brazilian Portuguese: [ˈnɔsɐ sẽˈɲɔɾɐ da ˈɡlɔɾi.ɐ]) is a municipality located in the Brazilian state of Sergipe. Its population was 37,324 (2020) and its area is 757.45 km^{2} (292.45 mi^{2}). It has a population density of 48 inhabitants per square kilometer. Nossa Senhora da Glória is located 126 km^{2} (49 mi^{2}) from the state capital of Sergipe, Aracaju.

== See also ==
- List of municipalities in Sergipe
