= Capela, Sergipe =

Municipality in Sergipe, Brazil

Capela Município de Capela
- Municipality
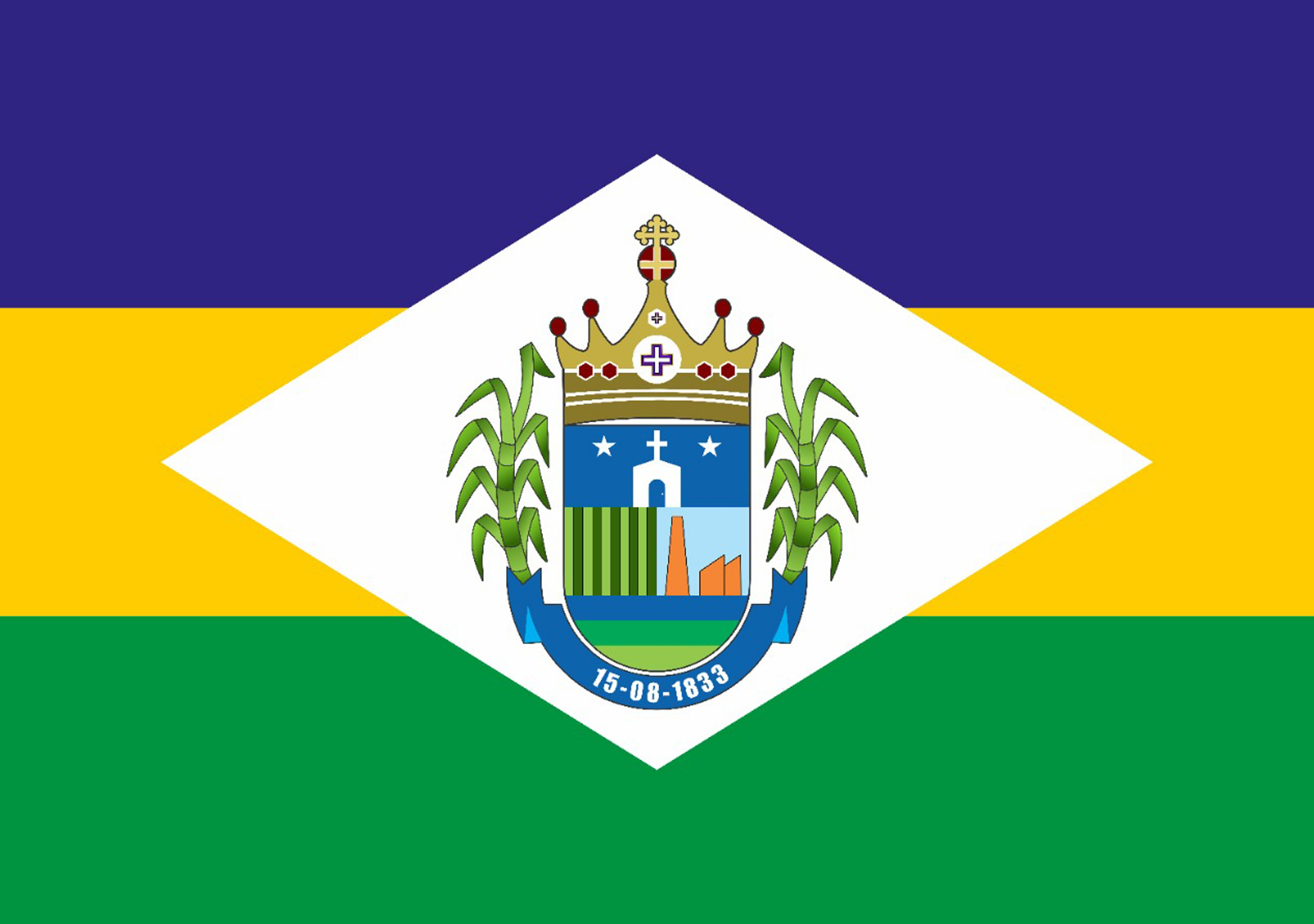
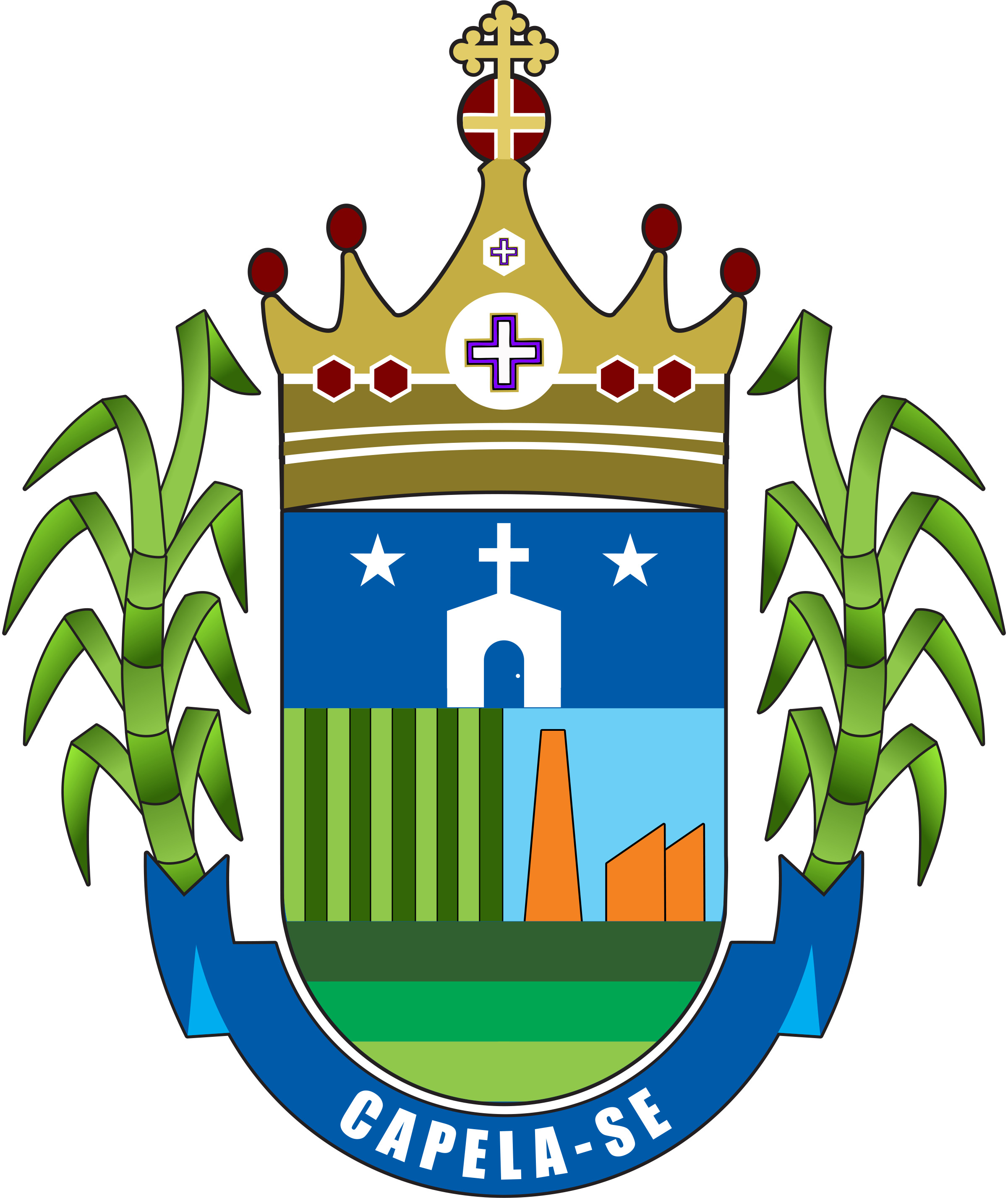
- Flag Coat of arms
- Interactive map of Capela
- Coordinates: 10°30′10″S 37°03′10″W
- Country: Brazil
- Region: Northeast
- State: Sergipe

Area
  - Total: 441 km^{2} (170 sq mi)

Population (2020)
  - Total: 34,514
  - Density: 78.3/km^{2} (203/sq mi)
- Time zone: UTC−3 (BRT)

Capela (Brazilian Portuguese: [kaˈpɛlɐ]; 'Chapel') is a municipality located in the Brazilian state of Sergipe. As of the 2020 IBGE estimate, there were 34,514 people living there and its area is 441 km^{2}.

== See also ==
- List of municipalities in Sergipe
