= Malhador =

Municipality in Sergipe, Brazil

- Municipality
- Flag Coat of arms

- Location in Brazil
- Coordinates: 10°39′28″S 37°18′18″W
- Country: Brazil
- Region: Northeast
- State: Sergipe

Area
  - Total: 101 km^{2} (39 sq mi)

Population (2020)
  - Total: 12,653
  - Density: 125/km^{2} (324/sq mi)
- Time zone: UTC−3 (BRT)

Malhador (Brazilian Portuguese pronunciation: [mɐʎɐˈdo], alternatively mɐjɐˈdo) is a municipality located in the Brazilian state of Sergipe. It is a little city in a rural area. It is located near Itabaiana. Its population was 12,653 (2020) and its area is 101 km^{2} (39 sq mi).

The municipality contains part of the Serra de Itabaiana National Park.

== See also ==
- List of municipalities in Sergipe
