= Ribeirópolis =

Municipality in Sergipe, Brazil

Coordinates: 10°32′20″S 37°26′10″W

- Municipality
- Flag
- Interactive map of Ribeirópolis
- Country: Brazil
- Time zone: UTC−3 (BRT)

Ribeirópolis (Brazilian Portuguese: [ʁibe(j)ˈɾɔpolis]) is a municipality located in the Brazilian state of Sergipe. Its population was 18,773 (2020) and its area is 262 km^{2}.

== See also ==
- List of municipalities in Sergipe
