= Feira Nova, Sergipe =

Municipality in Sergipe, Brazil

Feira Nova Município de Feira Nova
- Municipality
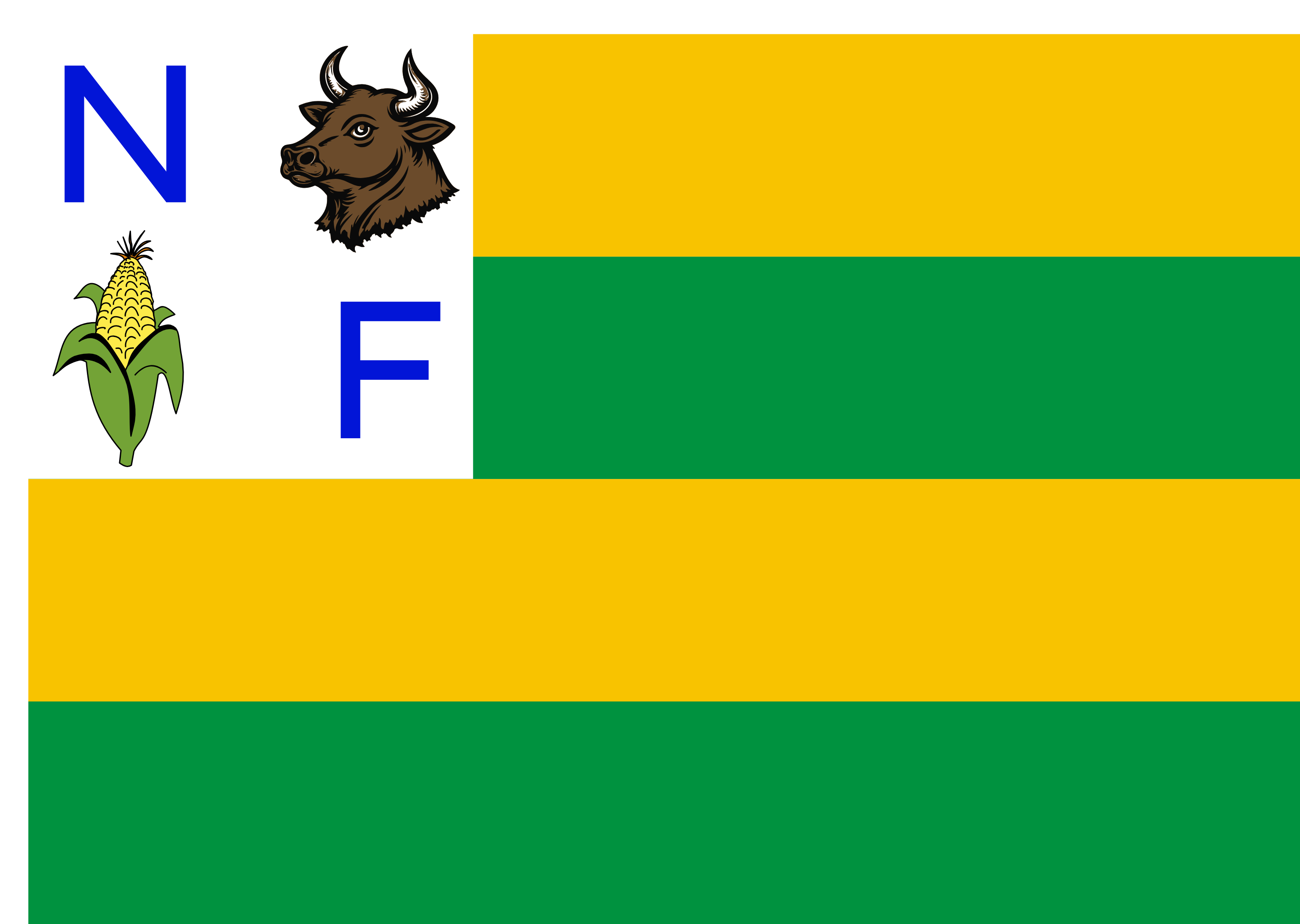
- Flag Coat of arms

- Location of Feira Nova in Sergipe

- Location of Feira Nova in Brazil
- Coordinates: 10°15′50″S 37°18′46″W
- Country: Brazil
- Region: Northeast
- State: Sergipe
- Founded: October 18, 1963

Government
  - Mayor: Jonathas Oliveira Santos

Area
  - Total: 183.3 km^{2} (70.8 sq mi)

Population (2020)
  - Total: 5,601
  - Density: 30.56/km^{2} (79.14/sq mi)
- Demonym: Feira-novense
- Time zone: UTC−3 (BRT)

Feira Nova (Central northeastern portuguese pronunciation: [ˈfeɾɐ ˈnɔvɐ]) is a municipality located in the Brazilian state of Sergipe. Its population was 5,601 in 2020, and its area is 183.3 km^{2} (70.8 mi^{2}).

== See also ==
- List of municipalities in Sergipe
