= Poço Verde =

Municipality in Sergipe, Brazil

- Municipality
- The Municipality of Poço Verde
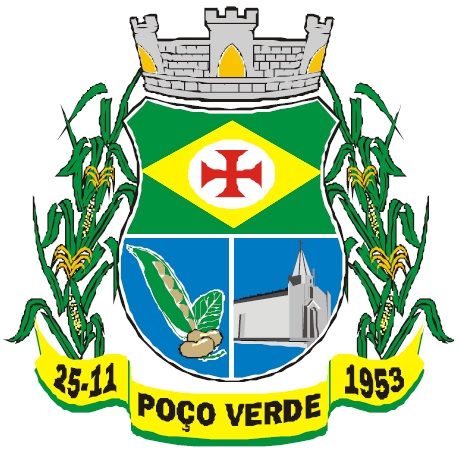
- Flag Coat of arms

- Location within Brazil
- Coordinates: 10°42′38″S 38°10′58″W
- Country: Brazil
- Region: Northeast
- State: Sergipe
- Founded: November 25, 1953

Government
  - Mayor: Iggor Oliveira (PSC)

Area
  - Total: 431 km^{2} (166 sq mi)
- Elevation: 268 m (879 ft)

Population (2020)
  - Total: 23,867
  - Density: 56.94/km^{2} (147.5/sq mi)
- Time zone: UTC−3 (BRT)
- HDI (2000): 0.597 – medium

Poço Verde (Brazilian Portuguese: [ˈposu ˈveʁdʒi]) is the westernmost municipality in the Brazilian state of Sergipe. Its population was 23,867 as of 2020 and its area is 431 square kilometers (166.4 square miles).

== See also ==
- List of municipalities in Sergipe
