= São Francisco, Sergipe =

Municipality in Sergipe, Brazil

Coordinates: 10°19′58″S 36°53′16″W

- Municipality
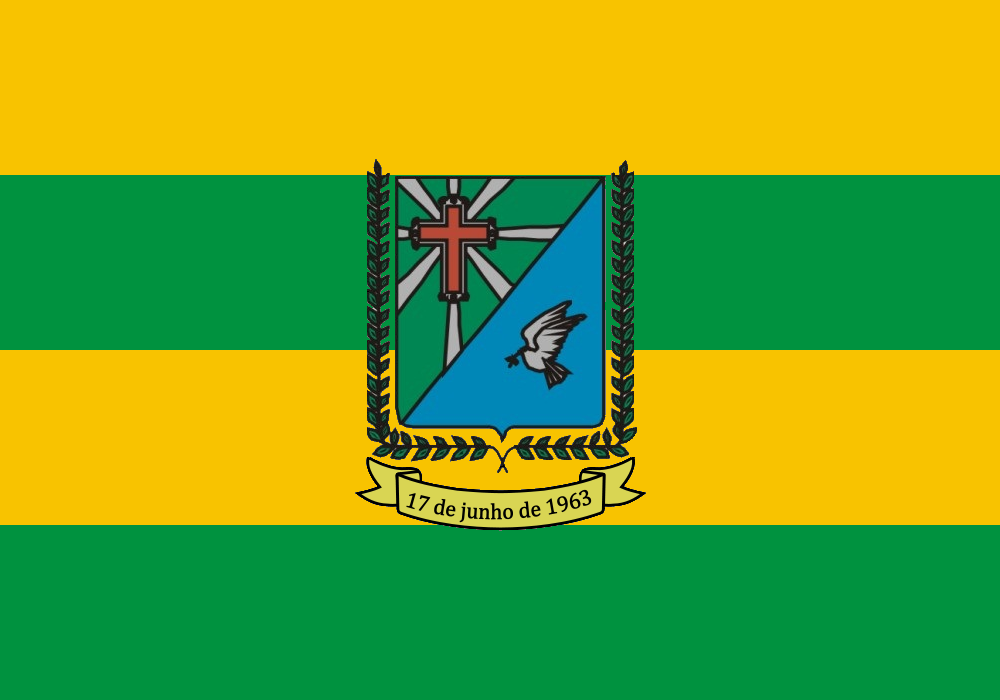
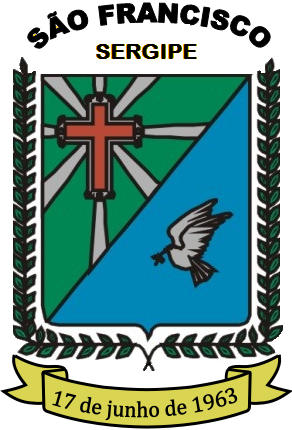
- Flag Coat of arms
- Interactive map of São Francisco, Sergipe
- Country: Brazil
- Time zone: UTC−3 (BRT)

São Francisco (Central northeastern Portuguese pronunciation: [ˈsɐ̃w fɾɐ̃ˈsiskʊ]) is a municipality located in the Brazilian state of Sergipe. Its population was 3,781 (2020) and its area is 83 km^{2} (32 sq mi).

== See also ==
- List of municipalities in Sergipe
