= Santa Rosa de Lima, Sergipe =

Municipality of Sergipe, Brazil

Coordinates: 10°38′45″S 37°11′38″W

- Municipality
- Flag Coat of arms
- Interactive map of Santa Rosa de Lima, Sergipe
- Country: Brazil
- Time zone: UTC−3 (BRT)

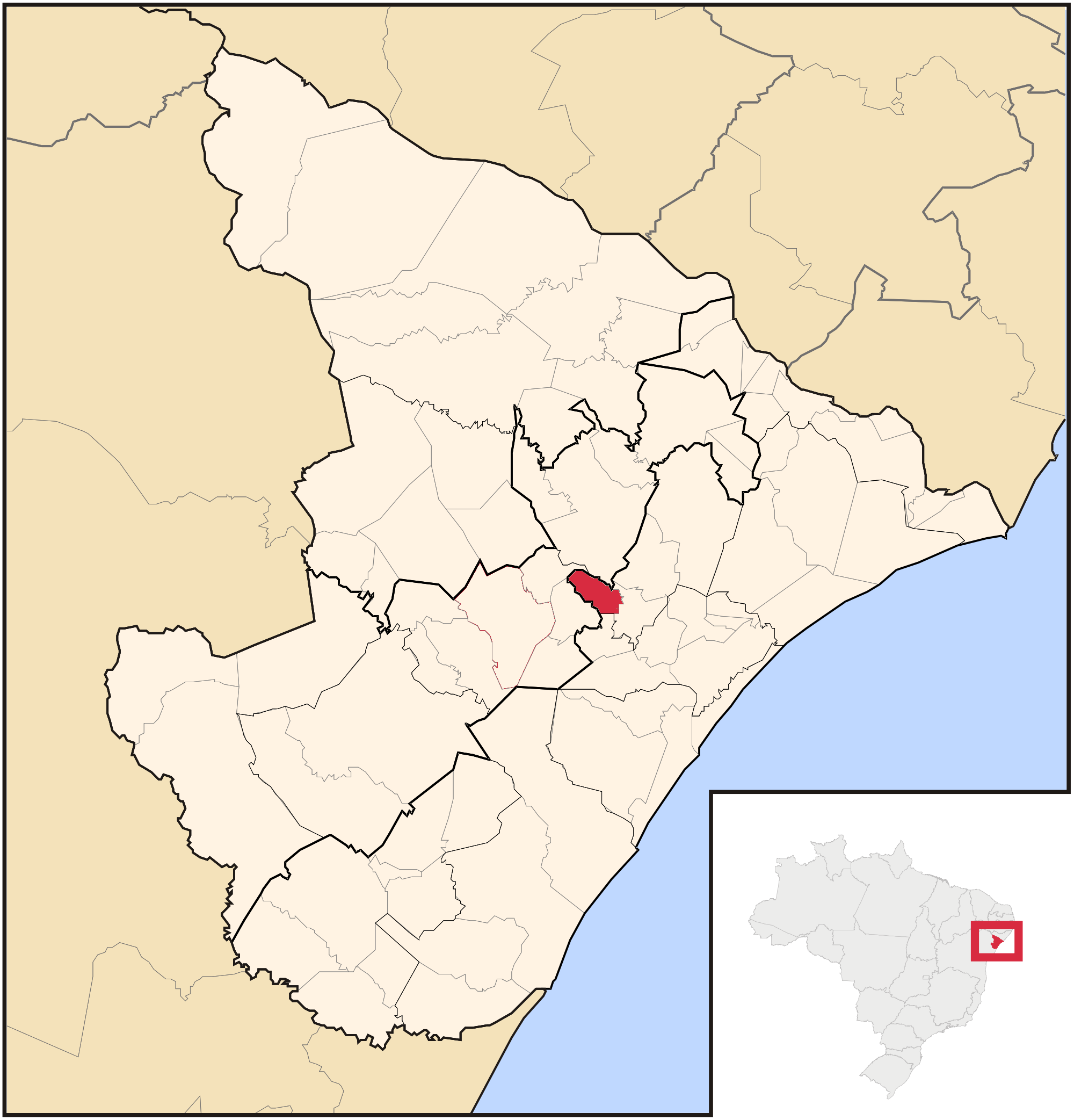
Locator map of Sergipe highlighting Santa Rosa de Lima

Santa Rosa de Lima (Brazilian Portuguese pronunciation: [ˈsɐ̃tɐ ˈɦɔzɐ ˈdi ˈlimɐ]) is a municipality located in the Brazilian state of Sergipe. Its population was 3,923 in 2020, and its area is 68 km^{2} (26 sq mi).

== See also ==
- List of municipalities in Sergipe
