= Nossa Senhora Aparecida, Sergipe =

Municipality in Sergipe, Brazil

Nossa Senhora Aparecida Município de Nossa Senhora Aparecida
- Municipality
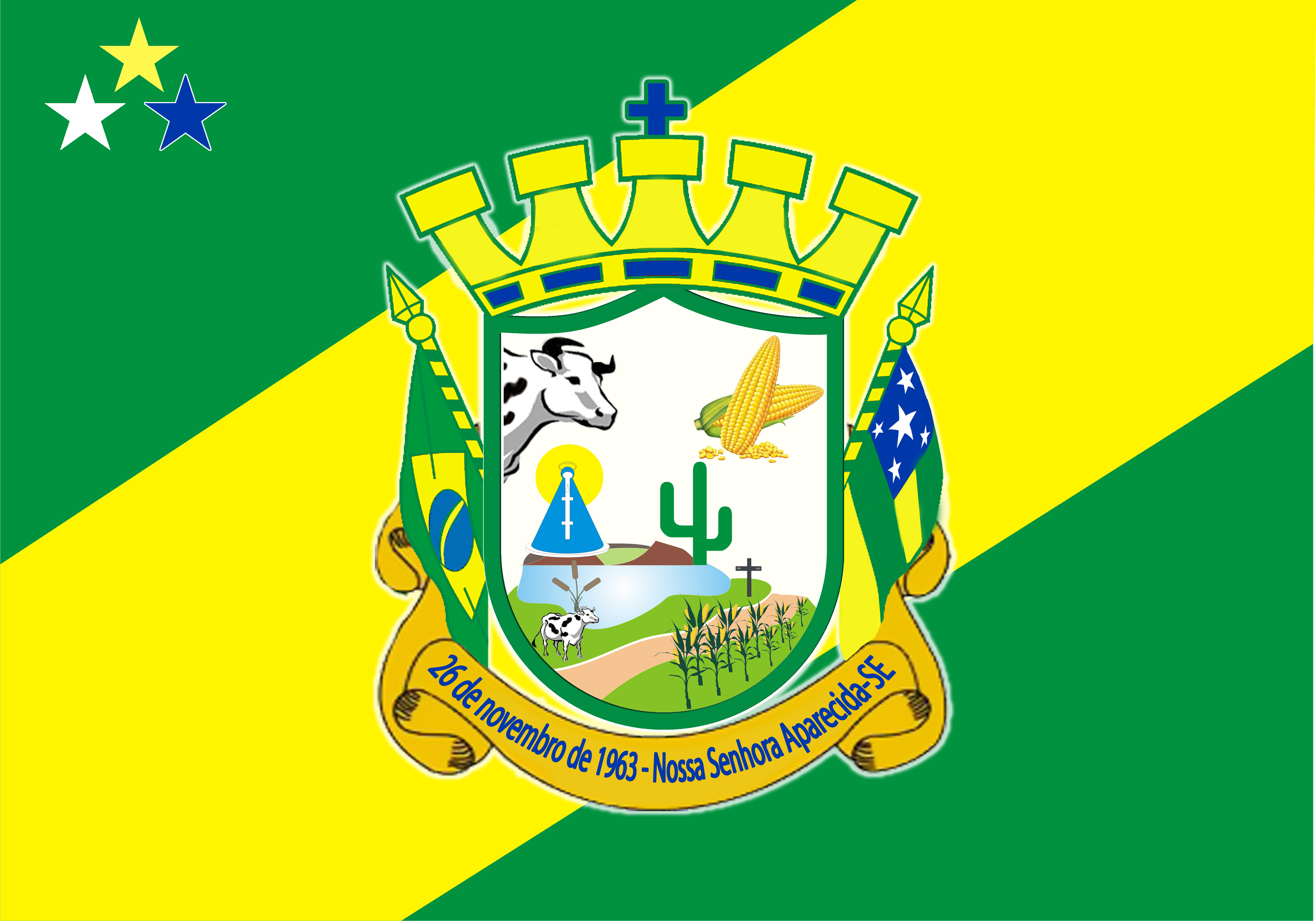
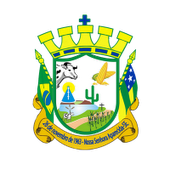
- Flag Coat of arms

- Location of Nossa Senhora Aparecida in Brazil
- Coordinates: 10°26′34″S 37°29′20″W
- Country: Brazil
- Region: Northeast
- State: Sergipe
- Founded: 1963

Government
  - Mayor: Veronica Santos Sousa da Silva

Area
  - Total: 341 km^{2} (132 sq mi)
- Elevation: 248 m (814 ft)

Population (2020)
  - Total: 8,809
  - Density: 25.8/km^{2} (66.9/sq mi)
- Time zone: UTC−3 (BRT)

Nossa Senhora Aparecida (Central northeastern portuguese pronunciation: [ˈnɔsɐ sĩˈj̃ɔɾɐ ɐpɐɾiˈsidɐ]) is a municipality located in the Brazilian state of Sergipe. Its population was 8,809 (2020) and its area is 341 km^{2} (132 mi^{2}). Nossa Senhora Aparecida has a population density of 26 inhabitants per square kilometer. It is located 99.1 km (61.6 mi) from the state capital of Sergipe, Aracaju.

== See also ==
- List of municipalities in Sergipe
