= Santo Amaro das Brotas =

Municipality in Sergipe, Brazil

Coordinates: 10°47′20″S 37°03′14″W

- Municipality
- Flag Coat of arms
- Interactive map of Santo Amaro das Brotas
- Country: Brazil
- Time zone: UTC−3 (BRT)

Santo Amaro das Brotas (Brazilian Portuguese pronunciation: [ˈsɐ̃tʊ ɐˈmaɾʊ ˈdɐɦ ˈbɾɔtɐ]) is a municipality located in the Brazilian state of Sergipe. Its population was 12,151 (2020) and its area is 235 km^{2}.

== See also ==
- List of municipalities in Sergipe
