= General Maynard =

Municipality in Sergipe, Brazil

- Municipality
- The Municipality of General Maynard
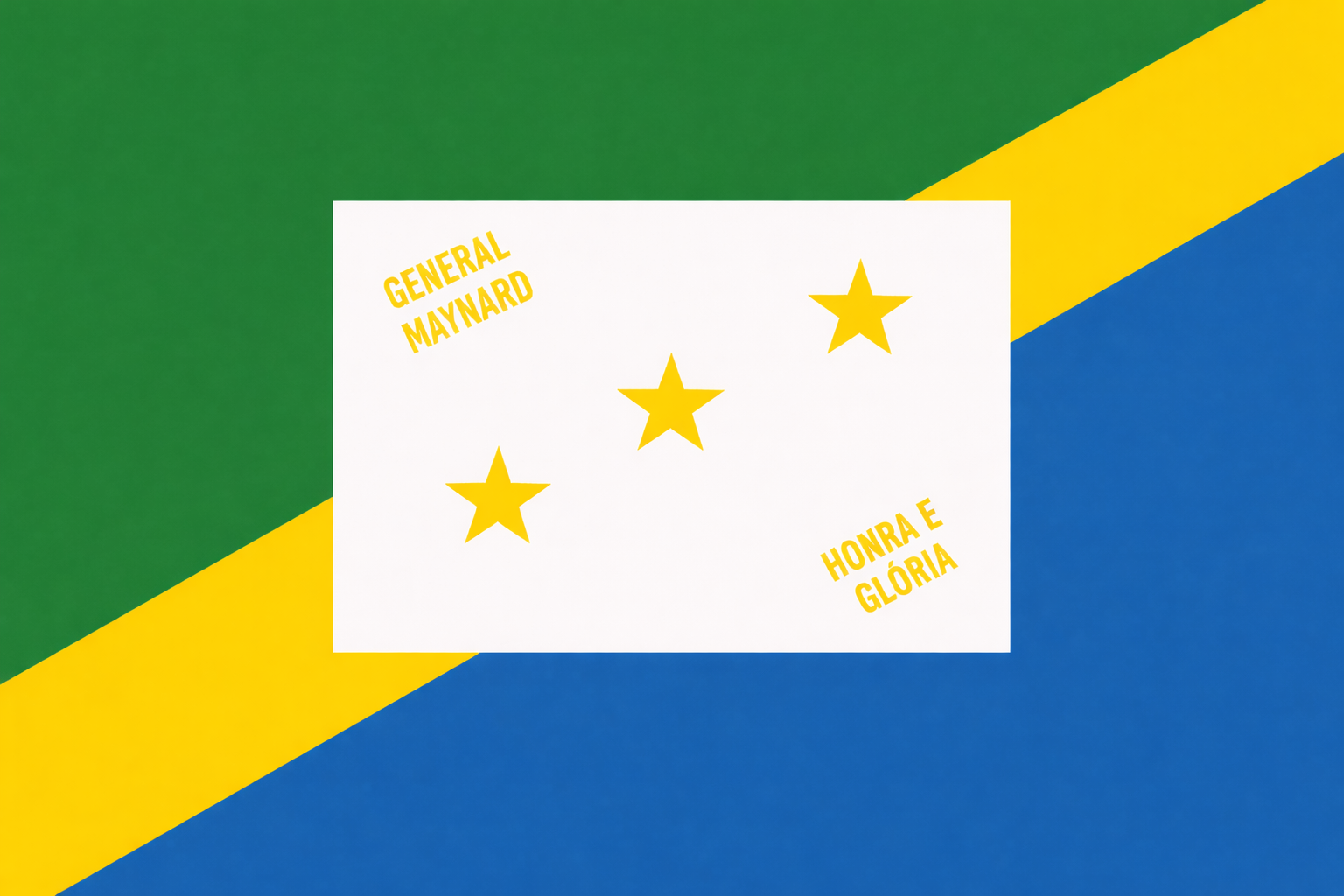
- Flag Coat of arms

- Location of General Maynard in the State of Sergipe
- Coordinates: 10°41′15″S 36°57′08″W
- Country: Brazil
- Region: Northeast
- State: Sergipe
- Founded: 1963

Government
  - Mayor: José Evangelista dos Santos Filho (PSB)

Area
  - Total: 20.221 km^{2} (7.807 sq mi)
- Elevation: 13 m (43 ft)

Population (2020)
  - Total: 3,384
  - Density: 167.4/km^{2} (433.4/sq mi)
- Time zone: UTC−3 (BRT)
- HDI (2000): 0.671 – medium

General Maynard (Brazilian Portuguese pronunciation: [ʒẽnɛˈɾɐw mɐjˈnɐ]) is a municipality located in the Brazilian state of Sergipe. Its population was 3,384 (2020) and its area is 20 km^{2} (7.7 sq mi).

== See also ==
- List of municipalities in Sergipe
