= Nossa Senhora de Lourdes, Sergipe =

Municipality in Sergipe, Brazil

Coordinates: 10°19′12″S 36°34′44″W

- Municipality
- Coat of arms
- Interactive map of Nossa Senhora de Lourdes, Sergipe
- Country: Brazil
- Time zone: UTC−3 (BRT)

Nossa Senhora de Lourdes (Brazilian Portuguese pronunciation: [ˈnɔsɐ sĩˈj̃ɔɾɐ ˈdi ˈluɦdisʼ]) is a municipality located in the Brazilian state of Sergipe. Its population was 6,496 (2020) and its area is 80 km^{2}.

== See also ==
- List of municipalities in Sergipe
