= Nossa Senhora das Dores, Sergipe =

Municipality in Sergipe, Brazil

Coordinates: 10°29′31″S 37°11′34″W

- Municipality
- Flag Coat of arms
- Interactive map of Nossa Senhora das Dores, Sergipe
- Country: Brazil
- Time zone: UTC−3 (BRT)

Nossa Senhora das Dores (Brazilian Portuguese: [ˈnɔsɐ sẽˈɲɔɾɐ daz ˈdoɾis]) is a municipality located in the Brazilian state of Sergipe. Its population was 26,795 (2020) and its area is 471 km^{2}.

It is named after 'Nossa Senhora das Dores', which translates to 'Our lady of Sorrows', referring to Mary, mother of Jesus.

== See also ==
- List of municipalities in Sergipe
