= Aquidabã =

Municipality in Sergipe, Brazil

Coordinates: 10°16′51″S 37°01′08″W

- Municipality
- Municipality of Aquidabã
- Flag Coat of arms

- Location of Aquidabã in Sergipe
- Country: Brazil
- Region: Northeast
- State: Sergipe
- Founded: 4 April 1882

Government
  - Mayor: Francisco Francimario Rodrigues de Lucena (Republicans)

Area
  - Total: 359.543 km^{2} (138.820 sq mi)
- Elevation: 180 m (590 ft)

Population (2020)
  - Total: 21,681
  - Density: 60.302/km^{2} (156.18/sq mi)
- Time zone: UTC−3
- Website: amparodosaofrancisco.se.gov.br

Aquidabã (Brazilian Portuguese: [akidaˈbɐ̃]) is a municipality located in the Brazilian state of Sergipe. Its population was 21,681 (2020) and its area is 357 km^{2} (138 sq mi).

== See also ==
- List of municipalities in Sergipe
