= Japaratuba =

Municipality in Sergipe, Brazil

Coordinates: 10°35′34″S 36°56′24″W

- Municipality
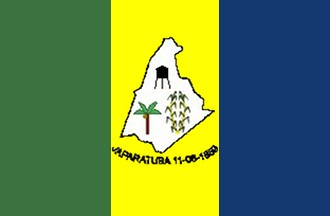
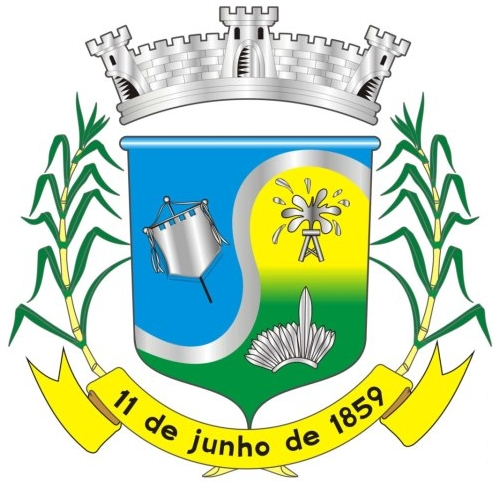
- Flag Coat of arms
- Interactive map of Japaratuba
- Country: Brazil
- Time zone: UTC−3 (BRT)

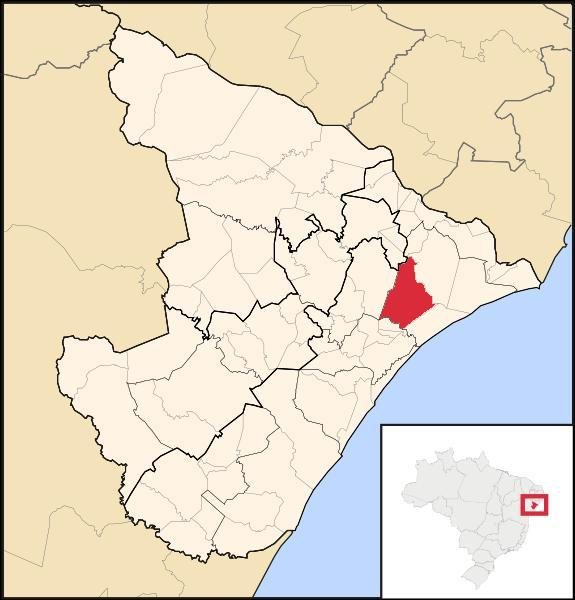

Japaratuba (Brazilian Portuguese: [ʒapaɾaˈtubɐ]) is a municipality located in the Brazilian state of Sergipe. Its population was 18,907 (2020) and its area is 360 km^{2}.

== See also ==
- List of municipalities in Sergipe
