= Rosário do Catete =

Municipality in Sergipe, Brazil

Coordinates: 10°41′45″S 37°01′51″W

- Municipality
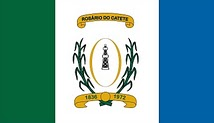
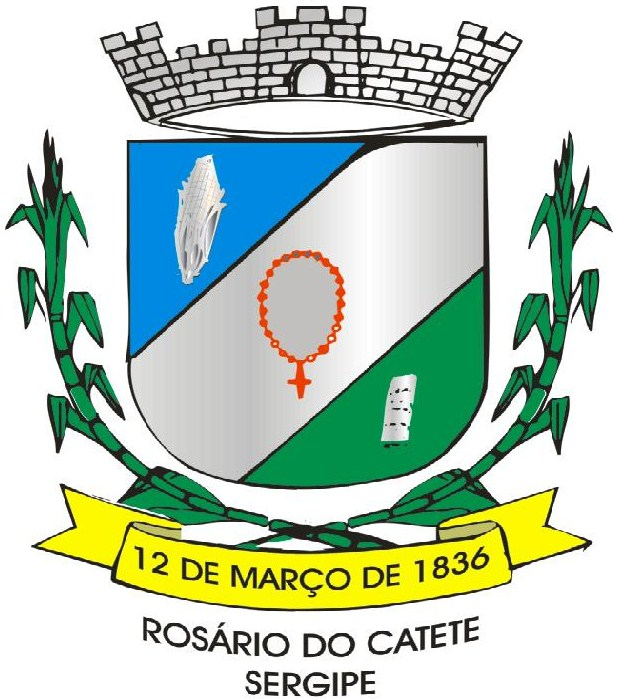
- Flag Coat of arms
- Interactive map of Rosário do Catete
- Country: Brazil
- Time zone: UTC−3 (BRT)

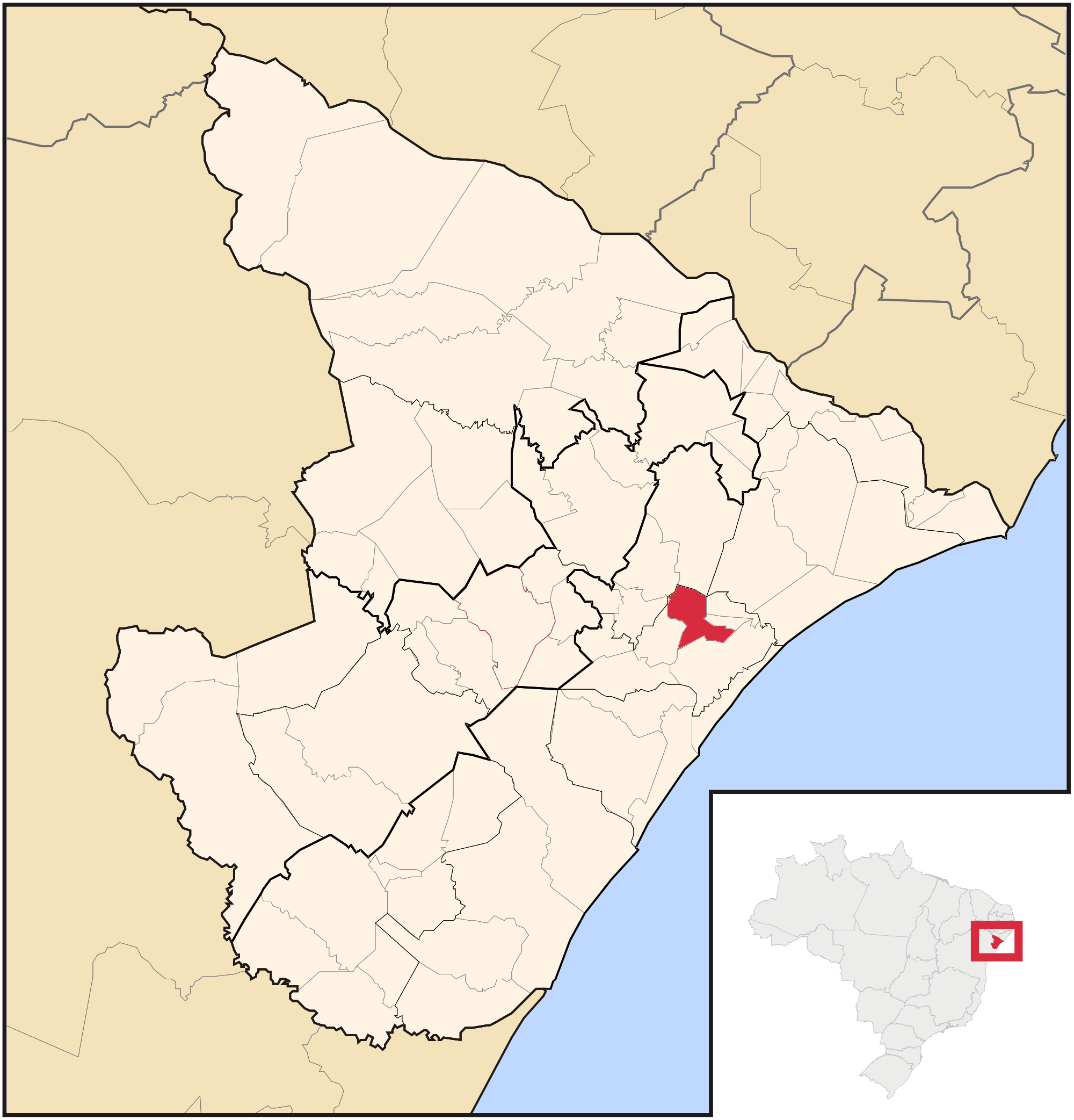
Locator map of Sergipe highlighting Rosário do Catete

Rosário do Catete (Brazilian Portuguese pronunciation: [ɦɔˈzaɾjʊ ˈdʊ kɐˈteti]) is a municipality located in the Brazilian state of Sergipe. Its population was 11,008 (2020) and its area is 105 km^{2} (41 sq mi).

== See also ==
- List of municipalities in Sergipe
