= Alagadiço =

- Village
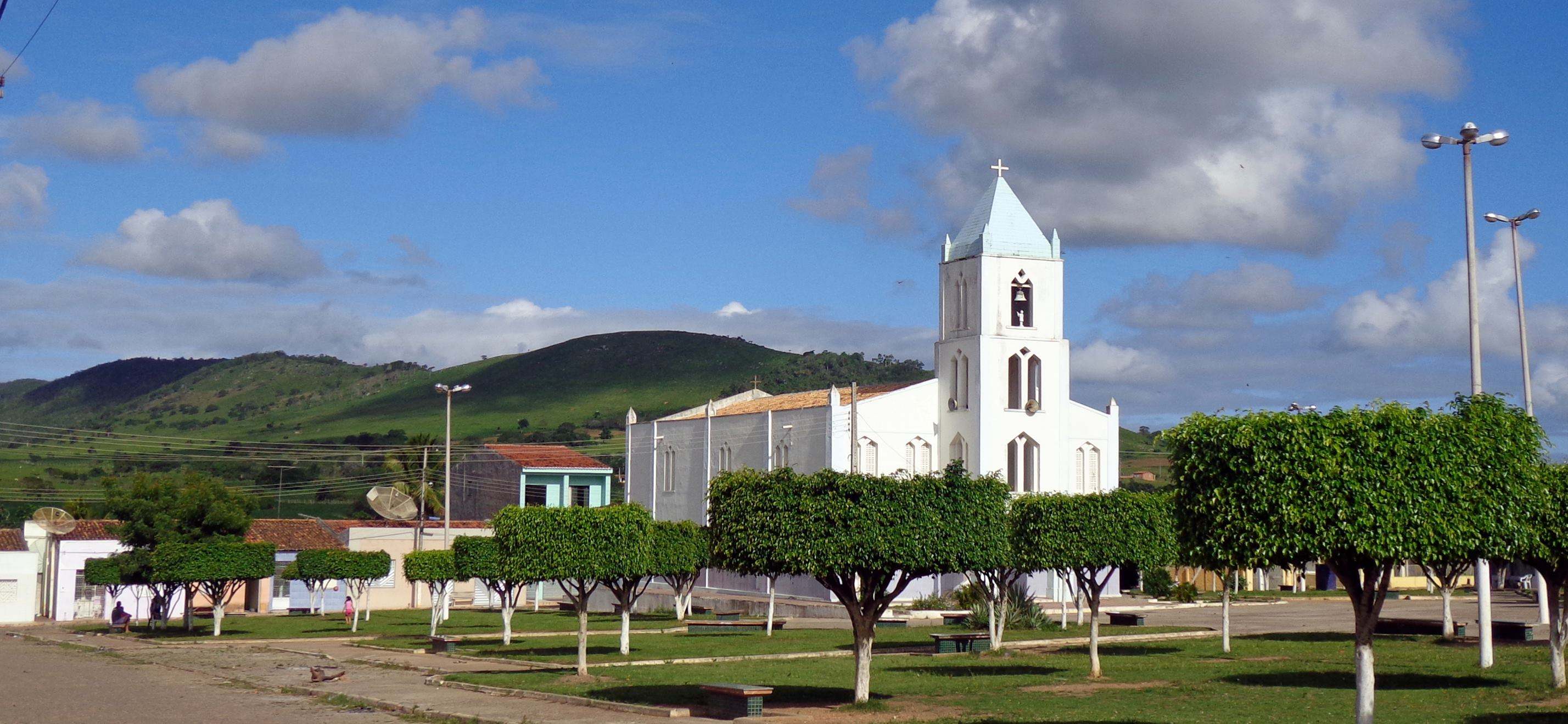
- Our Lady of the Immaculate Conception church, with the Campina Hill on the back
- Country: Brazil
- State: Sergipe
- Municipality: Frei Paulo
- Established: 19th century
- Elevation: 308 m (1,010 ft)
- Highest elevation: 537 m (1,762 ft)

Population
  - Total: 1,443
  - Density: 3,182/km^{2} (8,240/sq mi)
- Demonym: Alagadicense

Alagadiço (Portuguese pronunciation: [ɐlɐgɐˈdisʊ], lit. 'Wetland') is a village in the northeastern Brazilian municipality of Frei Paulo, located in the agreste region of the state of Sergipe founded in the mid 19th century. Alagadiço is known for its history involving the cangaço and for the passages of the bandits Lampião and Zé Baiano. As of 2022, it had a population of 1443 people, 571 households, an area of 453,380m² and a population density of 3182 people per square kilometer.

== History ==
=== Pre-columbian and colonial era ===
Before European colonization, the region where Alagadiço lies was inhabited by the native Kiriri people, part of the Macro-Jê language family. During the Portuguese and Dutch colonization, the central agreste region of Sergipe was slowly occupied by European explorers and settlers in search for lands that were suited for agriculture and animal husbandry, displacing the local native population. The last native settlements in the Carira micro region reached their end by the end of the 19th century.

=== Origins ===
In the 17th century explorers from Itabaiana were already advancing towards the hinterlands of Sergipe while clearing the forests and founding farms, one of the first farms to be established in the region was Batequerê (founded in the mid-1600s), 4 kilometers north of Alagadiço. The first farmers and vaqueiros to settle the area of what is today Alagadiço arrived in the early 19th century, during this time, what would eventually become Alagadiço was part of the Itabaiana municipality, and therefore most of the early families to arrive there came from villages near that town, such as Caraíbas and Flexas. But the origin of the settlement as a village itself is dated from the middle of the 19th century, during the last decades of the Empire of Brazil, when fugitive slaves and ex-slaves escaping from the sugar cane mills in the Cotinguiba river valley, modern day Laranjeiras, established themselves around the hills where the village currently is, founding a quilombo (type of colonial Brazilian hinterland settlement created by escaped slaves). The baptism registry of the "Saint Anthony & souls of Itabaiana" parish, which lists the baptisms done between 1867 and 1874, states that several baptisms were realized in the chapel of Alagadiço during that time period. At this time, the western sections of Itabaiana that had not yet been deforested and settled by farmers were known as "hinterlands of Itabaiana", and were still inhabited by natives led by the tribal chieftain "Imbiracema".

=== Antonio Conselheiro and the Canudos war ===
In 1874 the messianic leader Antonio Conselheiro, who would found the village of Belo Monte (Canudos) 19 years later, traveled through the Brazilian Northeast while preaching, building and renovating churches, cemeteries, and gathering followers. In the same year, he crossed the São Francisco river coming from Alagoas and entering Sergipe, during his passage through the state, Conselheiro and his followers briefly visited the village of Alagadiço, as it was in the way between Gameleira, Carira, and Frei Paulo.

In the 1890s, the Canudos war veteran João Sabino dos Santos, who had fought in the war under the third expedition led by colonel Antônio Moreira César, deserted the Brazilian army and moved to Alagadiço, located 185 kilometers to the east of the conflict. In 1897, the Brazilian government was searching for deserters from the war with the goal of arresting them for committing such crime, fearing her husband's arrest, João's devout Catholic wife, Angélica dos Santos, made a religious promise to Our Lady of the Immaculate Conception requesting for her husband's freedom. Since João was never arrested, the couple honored their promise by building a new chapel and praying yearly novenas to the saint; to this day, Our Lady of the Immaculate Conception remains as the patron of the village.

=== Cangaço ===
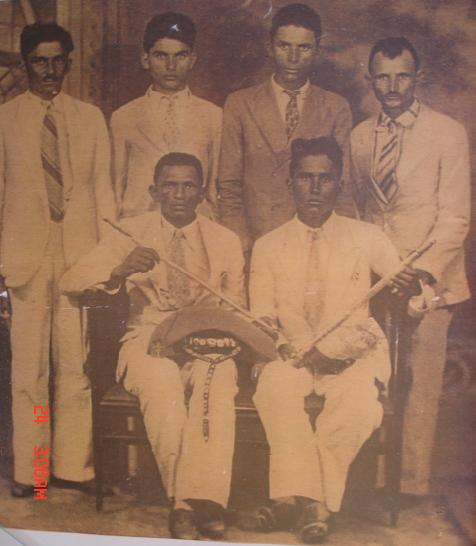
Group of civilians that ambushed Zé Baiano pose for a photograph in Aracaju, 29 June 1936. From left to right, standing, Pedro Sebastião de Oliveira "Pedro Guedes", Antônio de Souza Passos "Toinho", José Francisco de Souza "Biridin" and José Francisco Pereira "Dedé". And seated, Antônio de Chiquinho and Pedro Francisco "Pedro de Nica".

In the 1920's and 30's the village was plagued by several incidents of sackings and robberies by Lampião and his group, with Lampião himself being in Alagadiço four times between 1929 and 1936. The cangaço was a phenomenon of banditism that took place in the sertão and agreste regions of northeastern Brazil from the early/mid 19th century to 1937. The cangaceiros were interested in the geographically privileged position of the village's hills, which were surrounded by plains and therefore had a good vision of the surrounding are from their tops, which made it easy to see any police force that could try to fight Lampião's group from a long distance. The presence of the cangaço in Alagadiço reached its end on 7 June 1936, when the bandits José Aleixo Ribeiro da Silva (Zé Baiano), Acilino, Demudado and Chico Peste were killed by local civilians in an ambush on a farm near Alagadiço. The death of the cangaceiros was orchestrated by Antônio de Chiquinho, Pedro Sebastião de Oliveira, Pedro Francisco, Antônio de Souza Passos, José Francisco Pereira and José Francisco de Souza. On the 23rd of the same month, during the Saint John's Eve festivities, the until then secret news was revealed by a family member of one of the men involved in Zé Baiano's death, and the information soon reached the ears of Erônides de Carvalho, the governor of Sergipe.

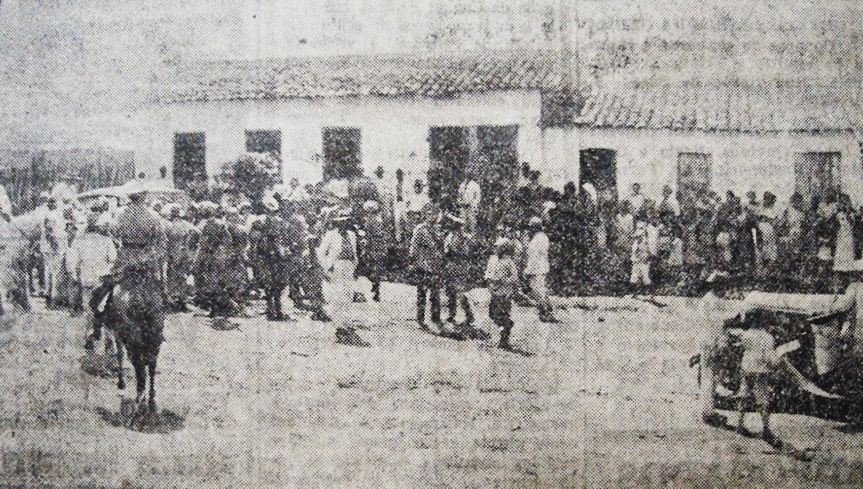
Police and forensics team in Alagadiço, 26 June 1936.

On 26 June, a group of forensics scientists and the state's police chief Osvaldo Nunes dos Santos came from Aracaju to the place where the bodies were buried to do an exhumation of the corpses and analyze the authenticity of such, which was confirmed. Fearing an act of revenge from Lampião, Antônio de Chiquinho built an armed force made out of the village's youth to protect the Alagadiço from a possible invasion, he went as far as drilling holes on the front walls of his own house, from where he planned to shoot, and digging trenches in the access roads of the settlement. On 2 September, Lampião, accompanied by a large number of bandits, visited Zé Baiano's burial place; however, he did not attack the village due to rumors that the state government had gifted it a 17th century Dutch cannon, a false information which had been purposefully spread with the objective of scaring the bandit leader.

== Economy ==
Since its origin, the village has had an economy based on family agriculture and animal husbandry. In the beginning and middle of the 19th century the economy was based primarily in subsistence agriculture. With the beginning of the civil war in the United States, the Union's blockade on the Confederate ports made it impossible for the cotton produced in the south to be exported to Europe. These events led to the increase in the price of cotton due to the high European demand for the product, which made its cultivation economically profitable for farmers and owners of large tracts of land, such as Cassimiro da Silva Melo, a landowner from Itabaiana who held much of what is today Frei Paulo and Alagadiço.

In the 1880s two decades after the war, the businessman, industrialist, landowner and city councilor of Itabaiana Godchaux Ettinger, an Ashkenazi Jewish immigrant from France who had moved to Sergipe years earlier, opened a cotton ginning factory in the then village of Frei Paulo, impulsioning the cotton industry of Alagadiço even more. These circumstances turned cotton into the main crop planted in the village and its surroundings until the 1940's. In the second half of the 20th century, the cultivation of cassava and production of cassava flour became the main economic focus; nowadays, the village's economy is largely based on the farming of corn and cattle herding.

== Climate ==
Alagadiço is in the northeastern Brazilian agreste, a transition zone between the humid and rainy Atlantic Forest and the semiarid caatinga. The rainy season occurs between the months of may and august, which is also the time in which the corn planting season takes place; the dry season is between the months of September and April. The Köppen climate classification system classifies Alagadiço as a dry summer tropical savanna.

== Geography ==
The village center is 308 meters above sea level, and it is surrounded by two large hills, the Campina hill on its east, and the Black hill on its west, with peaks of 537 and 523 meters respectively. The hills of Alagadiço house many springs of small rivers that feed the Vaza-barris and Sergipe rivers.

== Religion and culture ==
=== Religion ===
The village has a majority Christian population, most of which are followers of the roman catholic church, the rest of the Christians are members of several Protestant churches. Outside of Christianity, Alagadiço has a minority irreligious and candomblé population. The village houses the Our Lady of Immaculate Conception church, where the yearly novenas take place on every first week of December, as well as having its own parish; the parish hall is in the same building that Antônio de Chiquinho once lived in, until the early 2020s, the building still had the holes drilled in 1936 on its front walls. Alagadiço also houses two Protestant churches, one belonging to the Assemblies of God and the other to the Christian Congregation in Brazil.

=== Culture and leisure ===
Alagadiço has a traditional pífano band, a museum dedicated to its history involving the cangaço, a library (in the museum), several restaurants, the Aroaldo Oliveira football field and the Our Lady of the Immaculate Conception square.
