= Salgado River =

Salgado River may refer to several rivers in Brazil:

- Salgado River (Alagoas)
- Salgado River (Ceará)
- Salgado River (Rio Grande do Norte)
- Salgado River (São Francisco River)
- Salgado River (Sergipe River)
- Salgado River (Vaza-Barris River)
