= Simão Dias =

Municipality in Sergipe, Brazil

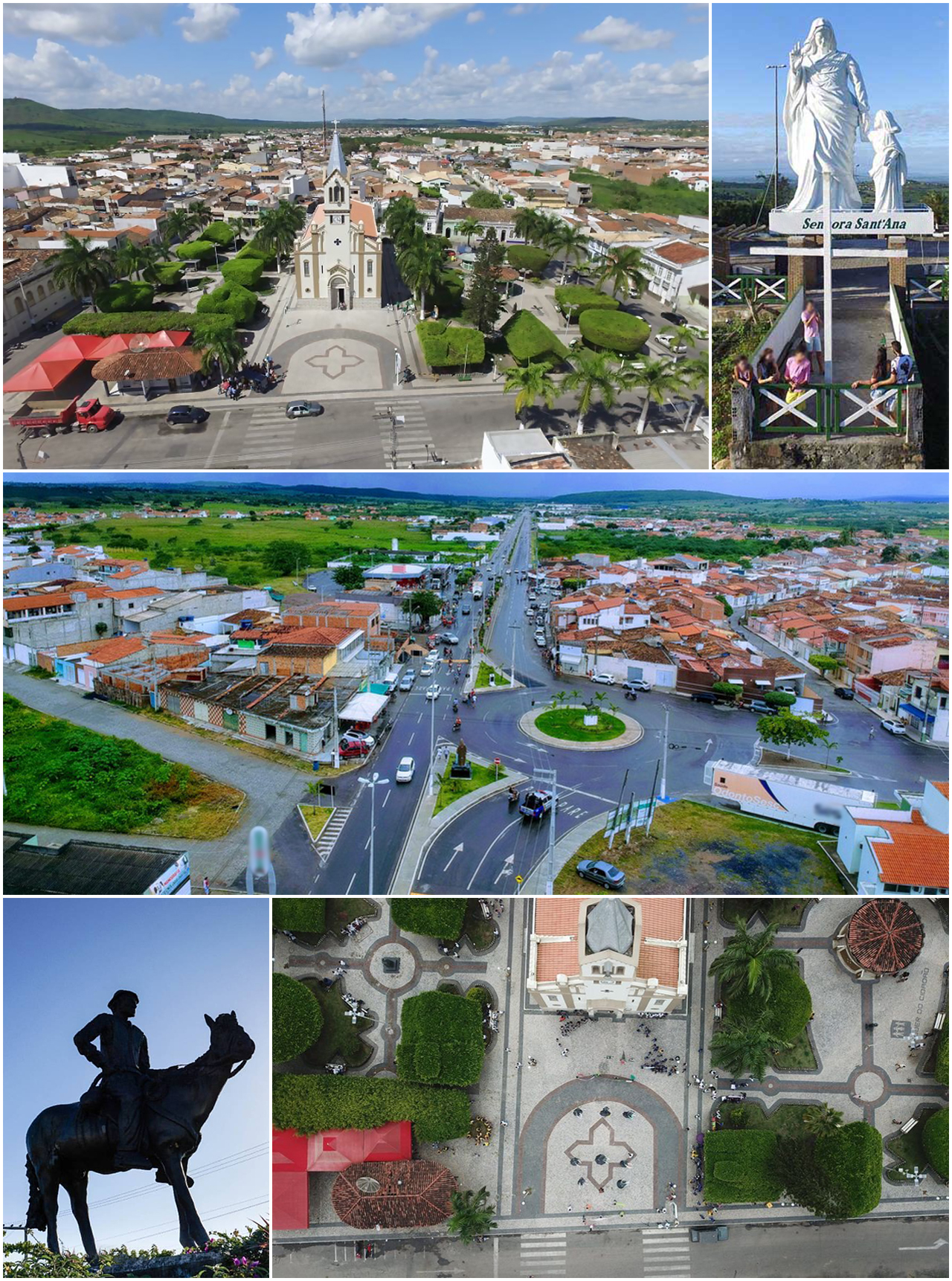

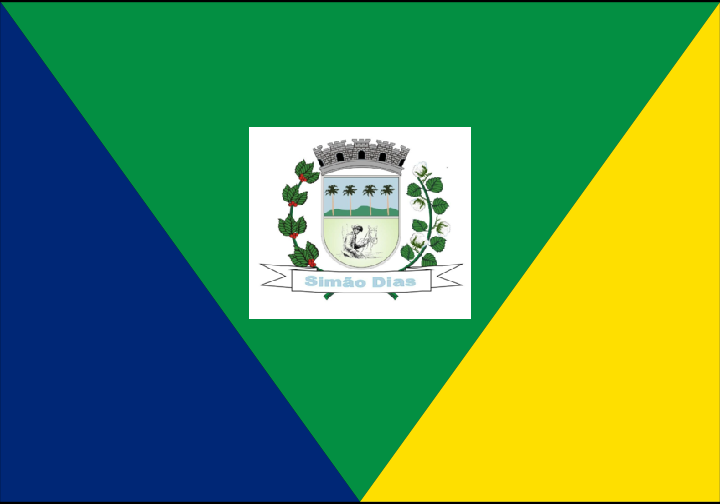
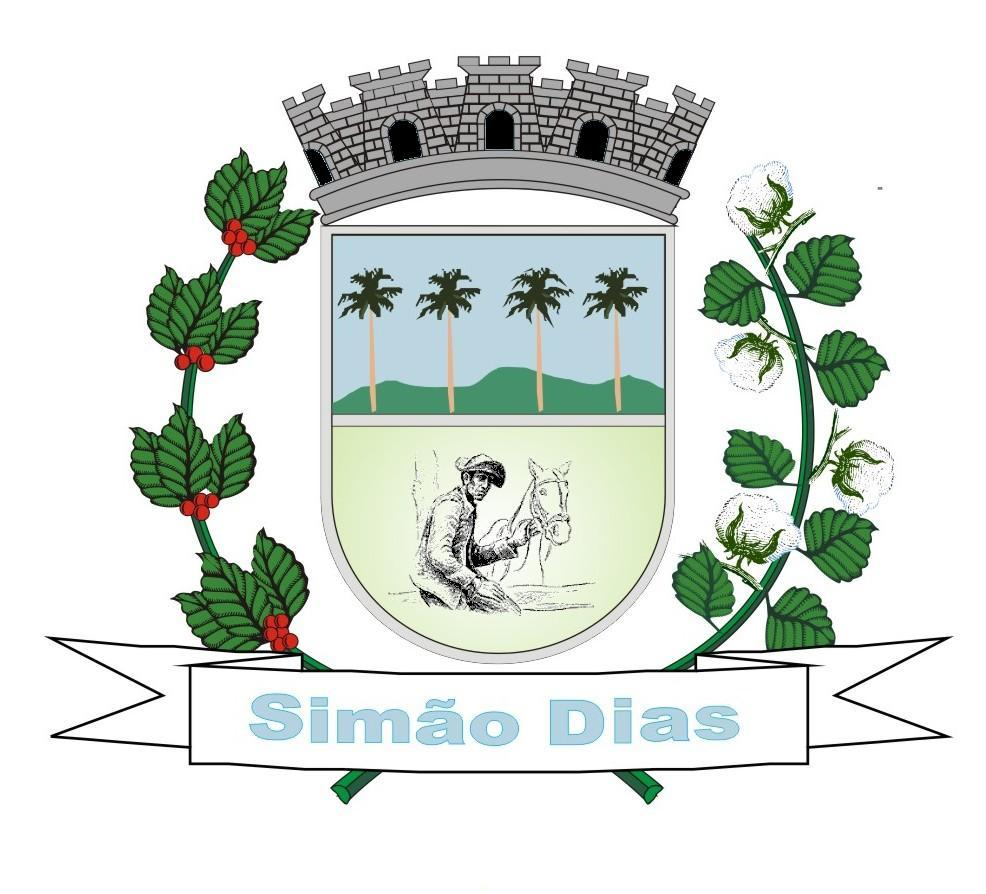
- Flag Coat of arms

- Location within Sergipe
- Coordinates: 10.738889°S 37.81°W
- Country: Brazil
- State: Sergipe
- Established: 1890

Area
  - Total: 560 km^{2} (220 sq mi)

Population (2020)
  - Total: 40,606

Simão Dias (Brazilian Portuguese: [siˈmɐ̃w ˈdʒi.ɐs]) is a Brazilian municipality located in the far west of the Brazilian state of Sergipe. Its population was 40,606 (2020) and it has an area of 560km^{2}. It was founded in 1890.

Paripiranga has adjacent municipalities in the State of Bahia, which are: Poço Verde, Tobias Barreto, Riachão do Dantas, Lagarto, Macambira, Pedra Mole and Pinhão territory in Sergipe.

== History ==
=== Origin ===
Simão Dias is built on a village of indigenous (remnants of Tapuias) fugitives who had fled the north, where Governor Luís de Brito e Almeida was carrying out colonizing expeditions in the sixteenth century. These indigenous peoples settled in the woods on the river Rio Caiçá.

The lands of the county are rugged due to the presence of a range of mountains, with altitudes ranging from 200 to 750 meters. This favours the existence of a vegetation less vulnerable to droughts than typical backcountry. The zones between land and Paripiranga Simão Dias, municipality of Bahia, are formed by rough terrain, where you can check for closed forests, due to the impossibility of cereal crops and pastures. In this same area, there are numerous sites that grow fruit trees and food crops. This provided relief to the Indigeans who first inhabited this region a true oasis, opposite the backcountry. Hence the origin of several designations contained in historical documents, such as "Simão Dias's Woods," Matas Coité or the "Matas of Caiçá."

With the Dutch invasion of Sergipe in the mid-seventeenth century, farmers wanted to hide their flocks on the banks of the Rio Real. However Braz Rabelo, owner of Bahia, who owned herds in the lands of present Itabaiana, decided to hide his cattle in the forest land by the River Caiçá. Emerging from this episode is that the historical figure of the cowboy Simão Dias, responsible for driving the cattle and the appearance of the village that would become a city. Simão Dias was also the birthplace of great latinfundiários and planters bringing Mr. Martin Ferreira Matos, then one of the largest planters in the interior of Sergipe.

Simão Dias passed the village category for the City on June 12, 1890, by decree of the President of the State Felisbelo Freire, arguing that it had a large population - 10,984 people, a successful business, a railroad Vila said that connected to Arcanu, as well as the existence of a newly created district. Based on these arguments the village was emancipated from the municipality of Lagarto. The railroad, which served as one of the arguments for the political emancipation of the old village, was never completed, leaving today remaining in abandoned farms only excavations and foundations of bridges where the lines were planned.

The county name is a tribute to a settler dating back to the early days of the occupation of Sergipe, a Frenchman named Simão Dias who in the years 1599, 1602 and 1607, along with Christopher and Augustine Dias da Costa, by application requested land grants in the region. The last requirement, which the codex is the Historical and Geographical Institute of Sergipe, calls "three leagues of land in picture" in Itabaiana of lands for cattle ranching. Freire Felisbelo, who was besides state president also a historian, says:

"The land on which it is built today (1891) the village were donated to Simão Dias Fontes, Christopher and Augustine Dias da Costa." (Freire: 1997, p .. 322).

However the thesis sustained by historian Felisbelo Freire was the target of opposition by Fr John Matos Carvalho, who had intended to credit the H butonorable Sebastião da Fonseca Andrade (Baron de Santa Rosa) for the construction of the temple of the current array of Santana. Father Joao de Matos took advantage of the contradictions found in various theories about the origin of the village, because the historical documents that spoke of Simão Dias, in letters of donation land grants, surnames have diversified beyond requesting allotments in different periods. Therefore, to Father John de Matos Carvalho, had the opportunity to have two historical characters with the same name. In the intention of provoking controversy and weaken the thesis of Felisbelo Freire, he published a work entitled "Matas of Simão Dias," in which vehemently defends the thesis that the city originated thanks to the donation of their ancestral Ana Francisca Menezes. The goal was to raise doubt about the historical version, as well as to disparage figure cowboy and enhance the figure of his ancestor, donor of the land where the first chapel was built that originated the parish of Santana in Simão Dias. Simão Dias' Church

Before having "status" of the village, the current council was formed as a parish by Act of February 6, 1835, breaking up the Parish of Lagarto. The chapel that motivated its creation date of 1655, as advocates historians. However the only ancient document on the subject is from 1784.

Due to the progress of the government of the Province Parish fell on March 15, 1850, the decree amounted to a town by the name of Lady Anne Simão Dias.

Thus, the municipality of Simão Dias, had that name since the condition of parish and village. But the name that honored its first settler remained a short time, because the intent of Father João de Matos Freire de Carvalho was reached, and on October 25, 1912, the city would become known as Annapolis, by Decree Law n 621 °. After much controversy and reactions, especially the press, the name of Simão Dias was reinstated by the Decree Law No. 533 of 7 December 1944, favored by the determination of the Federal Government, then the Getúlio Vargas, who approved the plan of IBGE, curbing the coincidence of cities with the same name. As a municipality goiano existed with the same name, and oldest, the Annapolis sergipana had to change the name.

As for policy, the municipality simãodiense had a long phase of oligarchic rule, where the local government was exclusive to large landowners. The practices coronelista were present at that stage, and you can check remnants of coronelismo until the present day. However, from the 1930s, is starting to decay of large landowners in local politics, due to changes occurring as a result of the revolution, as well as the populist phenomenon developed from the 40s.[8][1]

== Geography ==
The region is located in the Drought Polygon, with average annual temperature of 24.1 °C, but in winter the temperature can vary between 9 and 18 degrees. Simão Dias is the coldest city in the Sergipe. The average precipitation of rainfall per year is 880 mm, most prevalent from March to August (autumn-winter). The relief is represented by municipal pediplains with occasional ridges and tabular forms, the city has many caves and caverns. The municipality comprises capoeira vegetation, schrubs, grasslands and fields and traces of dirty Mata. The municipality is inserted in the river basins Vaza-Barris River and Piauí, with major rivers across the river Vaza-Barris, Jacaré rivers and Caiçá.

== Economy ==
The region's main sources of revenue farming (cassava, maize, beans, orange and passion fruit), livestock (cattle, sheep, pigs and horses), poultry (chickens, ostrich) and mining (extraction of carbonate rock, for transformation into lime and gravel) implemented by Cal manufactures Industrial LTD located in Clover Village Tight Stones in the northeast of the city. The industrial sector is expanding with the creation of the Industrial District (still under construction) with four projects already confirmed in the complex: two of the mobile industry, a renovation on the tires and another with manipulation of metals, in addition to expanding an existing footwear factory.

== See also ==
- List of municipalities in Sergipe

== Sources ==
1. ↑ a b c Acervo Biblioteca IBGE, Acervo documentação territorial: Simão Dias.
2. ↑ a b Divisão Territorial do Brasil. Divisão Territorial do Brasil e Limites Territoriais. Instituto Brasileiro de Geografia e Estatística (IBGE) (1 de julho de 2008). Página visitada em 11 de outubro de 2008.
3. ↑ IBGE (10 out. 2002). Área territorial oficial. Resolução da Presidência do IBGE de n° 5 (R.PR-5/02). Página visitada em 5 dez. 2010.
4. ↑ Censo Populacional 2010. Censo Populacional 2010. Instituto Brasileiro de Geografia e Estatística (IBGE) (29 de novembro de 2010). Página visitada em 11 de dezembro de 2010.
5. ↑ a b c d Projeto Cadastro da Infra-Estrutura Hídrica do Nordeste, Diagnóstico do Município de Simão Dias, 2002.
6. ↑ Ranking decrescente do IDH-M dos municípios do Brasil. Atlas do Desenvolvimento Humano. Programa das Nações Unidas para o Desenvolvimento (PNUD) (2000). Página visitada em 11 de outubro de 2008.
7. ↑ a b Produto Interno Bruto dos Municípios 2004–2008. Instituto Brasileiro de Geografia e Estatística. Página visitada em 11 dez. 2010.
8. ↑ História de Sergipe Colonial e Provincial, História da cidade de Simão Dias.
9. ↑ Agência Sergipe de Notícias.
