= Jacoca River (Sergipe) =

Location
- Country: Brazil

Physical characteristics
- Source
  - location: Sergipe state
- Mouth: Sergipe River
  - coordinates: 10°25′55″S 37°19′51″W

The Jacoca River is a river of Sergipe state in northeastern Brazil.

== See also ==
- List of rivers of Sergipe
- Sergipe
