= Gravatá, Pedra Mole =

Gravatá
- Village
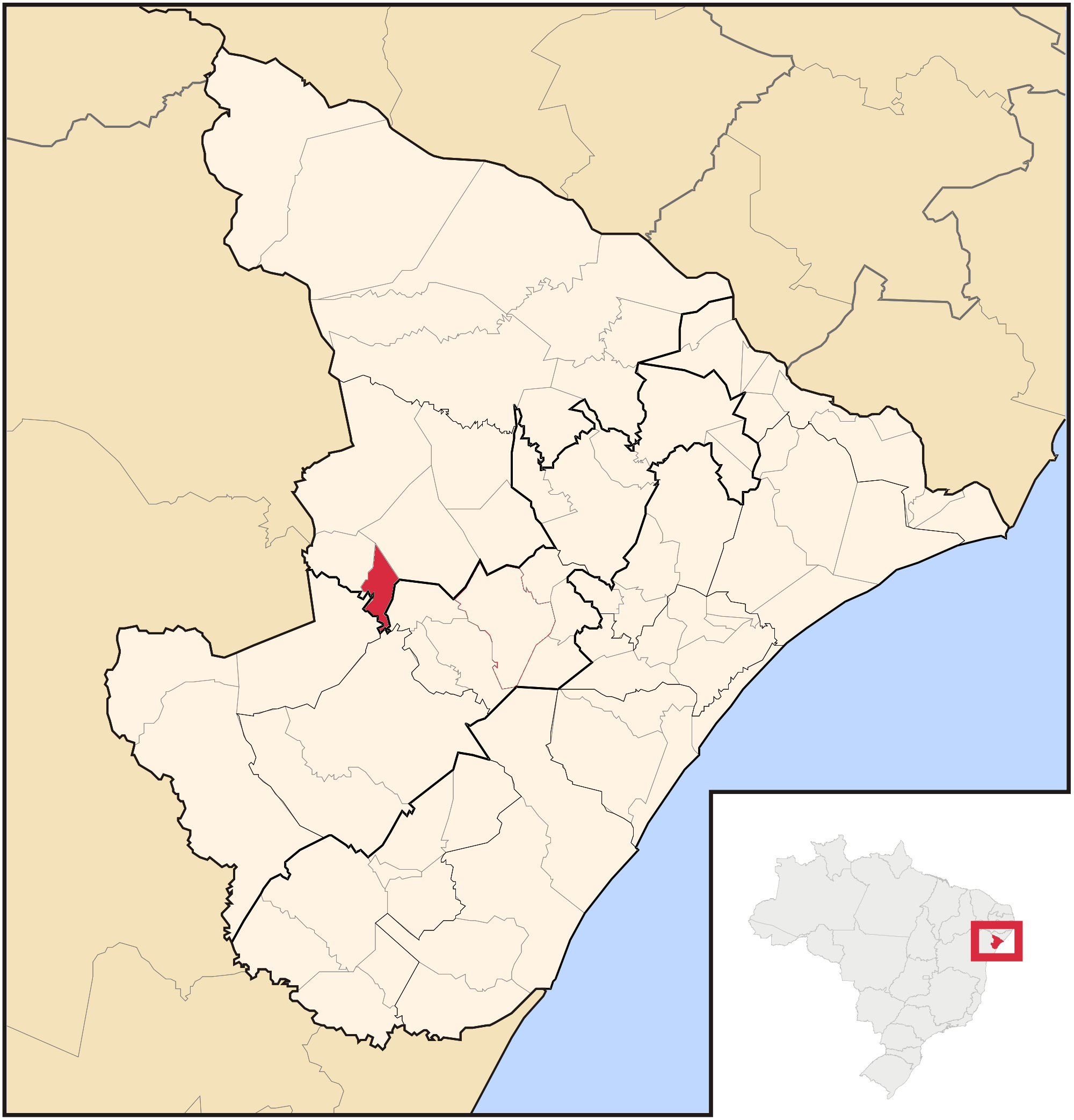
- Location of Pedra Mole in Sergipe

- Location within Brazil
- Coordinates: 10°35′28″S 37°40′27″W
- Country: Brazil
- State: Sergipe
- Municipality: Pedra Mole
- Elevation: 268 m (879 ft)
- Population (2022): 266

Gravatá (Brazilian Portuguese pronunciation: [gɾɐvɐ'ta or grɐɦɐˈta]) is a village in the municipality of Pedra Mole, state of Sergipe, in northeastern Brazil. As of 2022 it had a population of 266.

== See also ==
- List of villages in Sergipe
