= Cágado River (Sergipe) =

Location
- Country: Brazil

Physical characteristics
- Source
  - location: Sergipe state

The Cágado River is a river of Sergipe state in northeastern Brazil. it is one of the main affluents of the Sergipe River, from its left margin.

== See also ==
- List of rivers of Sergipe
