= Jacaré =

Jacaré (Portuguese: [ʒa.ka.ˈɾɛ], caiman or alligator), may refer to:

== People ==
- Ronaldo Souza (born 1979), Brazilian jiu-jitsu practitioner and mixed martial artist, nicknamed Jacaré
- Romero Cavalcanti (born 1952), Brazilian jiu-jitsu instructor, nicknamed Jacaré
- Jacaré (dancer) (born 1972), Edson Gomes Cardoso Santos, pagode dancer
- Jacaré (footballer, born 1971), Ermison José Leopoldo, Brazilian football forward
- Jacaré (footballer, born 2007), João Vitor Barros Silva, Brazilian football right-back for Corinthians
- Vítor Jacaré (born 1999), Francisco Vítor Silva Costa, Brazilian football forward for forward for América Mineiro.

== Brazil ==
- Barra do Jacaré
- Jacaré (Rio de Janeiro), a neighborhood of Rio de Janeiro, Brazil
- Jacaré dos Homens
- Santana do Jacaré

=== Rivers ===
- Jacaré River (disambiguation), several rivers
- Jacaré Grande River, a river of Pará state in Brazil
- Jacaré-Pepira River, a river of São Paulo in southeastern Brazil

== Other ==
- Jacaré (film), a 1942 American film directed by Charles E. Ford
- Yacare caiman, a species of caiman found in central South America
- Qualea dichotoma (also known as "jacaré"), a species of tree found in southern Brazil
- Arena do Jacaré, a football stadium in Sete Lagoas, Minas Gerais state
