= Mocambo, Frei Paulo =

Mocambo
- Village
- Location of Frei Paulo in Sergipe

- Location within Brazil
- Coordinates: 10°33′28″S 37°38′7″W
- Country: Brazil
- State: Sergipe
- Municipality: Frei Paulo
- Elevation: 202 m (663 ft)
- Population (2022): 1,362

Mocambo or Mucambo (Brazilian Portuguese pronunciation: [mʊˈkɐ̃bʊ]) is a village in the municipality of Frei Paulo, state of Sergipe, in northeastern Brazil. As of 2022, it had a population of 1362. In Portuguese the word "mocambo" is a synonym of quilombo, a type of settlement founded by escaped slaves.

== See also ==
- List of villages in Sergipe
