= Sergipe (disambiguation) =

Sergipe is the smallest state of the Brazilian Federation.

Sergipe may also refer to:

- Sergipe Province, a former province of the Empire of Brazil
- Sergipe River, a river in Sergipe state
- Club Sportivo Sergipe, a Brazilian association football team
