= Jacaré River =

There are several rivers named Jacaré River in Brazil:

- Jacaré River (Alagoas)
- Jacaré River (Bahia, Das Contas River tributary), eastern Brazil
- Jacaré River (Bahia, São Francisco River tributary), eastern Brazil
- Jacaré River (Minas Gerais), southeastern Brazil
- Jacaré River (Piquiri River tributary), southern Brazil
- Jacaré River (Purus River tributary), north-western Brazil
- Jacaré River (Das Cinzas River tributary), southern Brazil
- Jacaré River (Sergipe, Piauí River tributary)
- Jacaré River (Sergipe, São Francisco River tributary)
- Jacaré Grande River, Pará state, north-central Brazil

== See also ==
- Jacaré (disambiguation)
