= Tapado, Pedra Mole =

Tapado
- Village
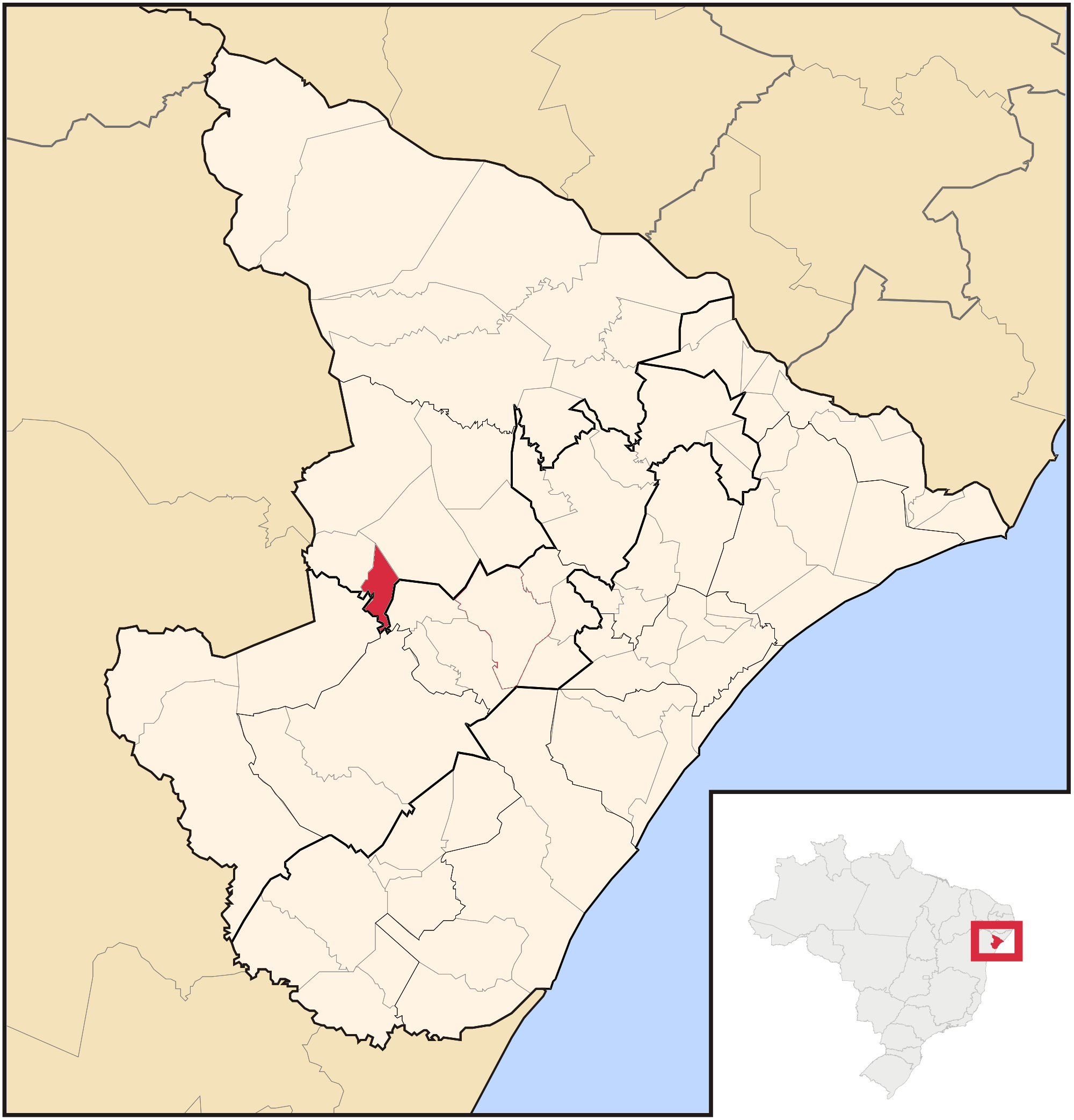
- Location of Pedra Mole in Sergipe

- Location within Brazil
- Coordinates: 10°35′45″S 37°42′1″W
- Country: Brazil
- State: Sergipe
- Municipality: Pedra Mole
- Elevation: 240 m (790 ft)
- Population (2022): 369

Tapado (Brazilian Portuguese pronunciation: [tɐˈpadʊ]) is a village in the municipality of Pedra Mole, state of Sergipe, in northeastern Brazil. As of 2022 it had a population of 369.

== See also ==
- List of villages in Sergipe
