= Jabiberi River =

Coordinates: 11°11′33″S 38°00′12″W

Location
- Country: Brazil

Physical characteristics
- Source
  - location: Sergipe state

The Jabiberi River is a river of Sergipe state in northeastern Brazil.

== See also ==
- List of rivers of Sergipe
