= Piauitinga River =

Location
- Country: Brazil

Physical characteristics
- Source
  - location: Sergipe state

The Piauitinga River is a river in Sergipe state in northeastern Brazil.

== See also ==
- List of rivers of Sergipe
