= Do Sal River =

There are two rivers named Do Sal River or Rio do Sal in Brazil:

- Do Sal River (Goiás)
- Do Sal River (Sergipe)
