= Arauá River (Sergipe) =

Coordinates: 11°15′00″S 37°32′00″W

Location
- Country: Brazil

Physical characteristics
- Source
  - location: Sergipe state

The Arauá River is a river of Sergipe state in northeastern Brazil.

== See also ==
- List of rivers of Sergipe
