= Salgado River (Sergipe River tributary) =

Location
- Country: Brazil

Physical characteristics
- Source
  - location: Sergipe state
- Mouth: Sergipe River

The Salgado River is a river of Sergipe state in northeastern Brazil. It is a tributary of the Sergipe River.

== See also ==
- List of rivers of Sergipe
