= Cachorro River =

There are three rivers named Cachorro River in Brazil:

- Cachorro River (Pará)
- Cachorro River (Roraima), a river of Roraima
- Cachorro River (Sergipe)

== See also ==
- Cachorro (disambiguation)
