= List of rivers of Sergipe =

List of rivers in Sergipe (Brazilian State).

The list is arranged by drainage basin from north to south, with respective tributaries indented under each larger stream's name and ordered from downstream to upstream. All rivers in Sergipe drain to the Atlantic Ocean.

== By Drainage Basin ==
- São Francisco River
  - Betume River (Poxim River)
  - Salgado River
  - Capivara River
    - Cachorro River
  - Campos Novos River
  - Jacaré River
- Sapucaia River
- Japaratuba River
  - Siriri River
- Sergipe River
  - Poxim River
    - Poxim Mirim River
    - Poxim Açu River
  - Pomonga River
  - Parnamirim River
  - Do Sal River
  - Cotinguiba River
  - Jacarecica River
  - Jacoca River
  - Cágado River
  - Da Campanha River
  - Salgado River
  - Das Lajes River
    - Socavão River
- Vaza-Barris River
  - Santa Maria River
    - Pitanga River
  - Salgado River
- Piauí River
  - Indiaroba River
  - Pagão River
  - Fundo River
  - Piauitinga River
  - Arauá River
  - Jacaré River
- Real River
  - Itamirim River
  - Jabiberi River

== Alphabetically ==
- Arauá River
- Betume River (Poxim River)
- Cachorro River
- Cágado River
- Da Campanha River
- Campos Novos River
- Capivara River
- Cotinguiba River
- Fundo River
- Indiaroba River
- Itamirim River
- Jabiberi River
- Jacaré River
- Jacaré River
- Jacarecica River
- Jacoca River
- Japaratuba River
- Das Lajes River
- Pagão River
- Parnamirim River
- Piauí River
- Piauitinga River
- Pitanga River
- Pomonga River
- Poxim Açu River
- Poxim Mirim River
- Poxim River
- Real River
- Do Sal River
- Salgado River
- Salgado River
- Salgado River
- Santa Maria River
- São Francisco River
- Sapucaia River
- Sergipe River
- Siriri River
- Socavão River
- Vaza-Barris River
