= Santa Maria River (Sergipe) =

Location
- Country: Brazil

Physical characteristics
- Source
  - location: Sergipe state

The Santa Maria River is a river of Sergipe state in northeastern Brazil.

== See also ==
- List of rivers of Sergipe
