= Parnamirim River =

Coordinates: 10°51′S 37°02′W

Location
- Country: Brazil

Physical characteristics
- Source
  - location: Sergipe state

The Parnamirim River is a river of Sergipe state in northeastern Brazil.

== See also ==
- List of rivers of Sergipe
