= Siriri River =

Coordinates: 10°40′49″S 36°54′28″W

Location
- Country: Brazil

Physical characteristics
- Source
  - location: Sergipe state

The Siriri River is a river of Sergipe state in northeastern Brazil.

== See also ==
- List of rivers of Sergipe
