= Jacarecica River =

Coordinates: 10°43′22″S 37°12′23″W

Location
- Country: Brazil

Physical characteristics
- Source
  - location: Sergipe state

The Jacarecica River is a river of Sergipe state in northeastern Brazil.

== See also ==
- List of rivers of Sergipe
