= Pomonga River =

Coordinates: 10°53′06″S 37°02′01″W

Location
- Country: Brazil

Physical characteristics
- Source
  - location: Sergipe state

The Pomonga River is a river of Sergipe state in northeastern Brazil.

== See also ==
- List of rivers of Sergipe
