= Itamirim River =

Coordinates: 11°31′05″S 37°37′56″W

Location
- Country: Brazil

Physical characteristics
- Source
  - location: Sergipe state

The Itamirim River is a river of Sergipe state in northeastern Brazil.

== See also ==
- List of rivers of Sergipe
