= Japaratuba River =

River in Brazil

Coordinates: 10°44′30″S 36°51′02″W

- Location of mouth

Location
- Country: Brazil

Physical characteristics
- Source
  - location: Sergipe state

The Japaratuba River is a river of Sergipe state in northeastern Brazil.

== See also ==
- List of rivers of Sergipe
