= Gootchaux Ettinger =

French-Brazilian politician and businessman

Godchaux Ettinger

Former city councilor of Itabaiana, Brazil

Personal details
- Born: April 16, 1836 Osthouse, Alsace, Kingdom of France
- Died: October 16, 1917, aged 81 Laranjeiras, Sergipe, First Brazilian Republic
- Citizenship: France, Brazil
- Spouse: Maria da Anunciação Jesus
- Children: Gabriel Ettinger, Isac Ettinger, Arão Ettinger, Julia Ettinger, Maurício Ettinger
- Parent(s): Alexandre Ettinger (father), Sara Bloch (mother)
- Occupation: Politician, businessman, industrialist, farmer

Godchaux Ettinger, alternatively spelled as Gootchaux Ettinger, was a French–Brazilian politician, farmer, businessman and industrialist who served as city councilor for the municipality of Itabaiana in the late 19th century and built cotton ginning factories in Frei Paulo and Pinhão.

== Early life ==
Godchaux Ettinger was born in the French commune of Osthouse, near the border with the German Confederation, on April 16, 1836. Born in an Ashkenazi Jewish family, Godchaux had 11 siblings, being the 6th child of Alexandre Ettinger and Sara Bloch.

== Immigration to Brazil and death ==
Ettinger moved to Brazil in 1880, when his ship landed on the port of Aracati, Ceará. He established himself in the city of Itabaiana, Sergipe, where he would acquire rural properties in the then village of São Paulo (later renamed to Frei Paulo). Due to the civil war in the United States, the European demand for cotton increased the prices of the product and made it possible for farmers in the Itabaiana region to profit from its cultivation, observing the economic opportunity that this had brought, Godchaux decided to build the first cotton ginning factories in Frei Paulo and Pinhão, in 1889 and 1890 respectively, this made it possible for farmers in the region to separate the cotton from its seeds locally, without the need for extra expenses with transportation. A few years after, Ettinger became a city councilor for the municipality of Itabaiana. He died on October 26, 1917, in Laranjeiras, at the age of 81.
