= Osthouse =

- Commune
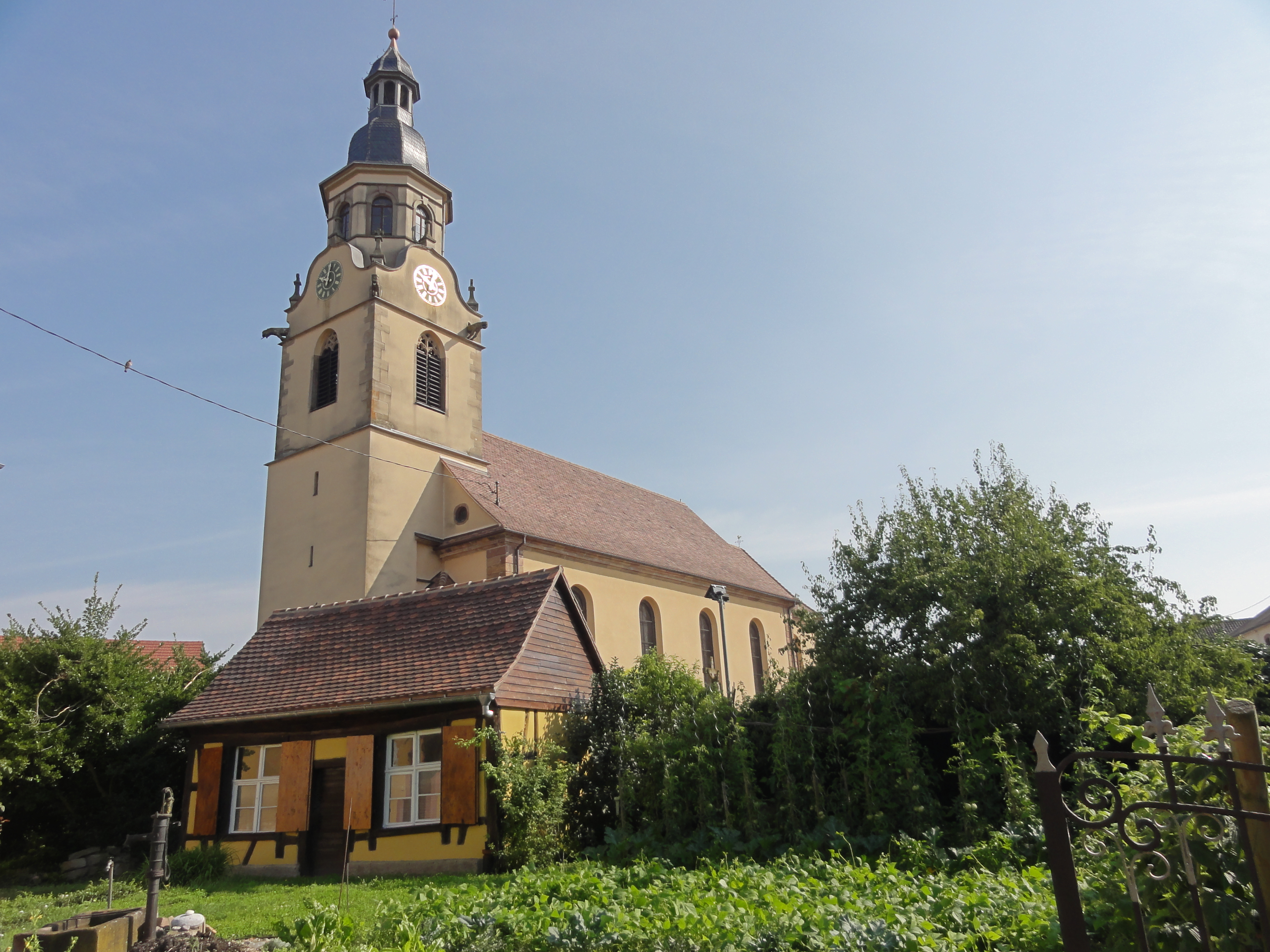
- The church in Osthouse

- Coat of arms
- Location of Osthouse
- Location within France Location within Grand Est
- Coordinates: 48°24′12″N 7°38′38″E
- Country: France
- Region: Grand Est
- Department: Bas-Rhin
- Arrondissement: Sélestat-Erstein
- Canton: Erstein
- Intercommunality: CC Canton d'Erstein

Government
  - Mayor (2020–2026): Christophe Breysach
- Area^{1}: 9.72 km^{2} (3.75 sq mi)
- Highest elevation: 157 m (515 ft)
- Lowest elevation: 151 m (495 ft)
- Population (2023): 975
  - Density: 100/km^{2} (260/sq mi)
- Time zone: UTC+01:00 (CET)
  - Summer (DST): UTC+02:00 (CEST)
- INSEE/Postal code: 67364 /67150
- ^{1} French Land Register data, which excludes lakes, ponds, glaciers > 1 km^{2} (0.386 sq mi or 247 acres) and river estuaries.

Osthouse (French pronunciation: [ɔstuz]; German: Osthausen) is a commune in the Bas-Rhin department in Alsace in north-eastern France.

The sole remaining wall of the 1865 synagogue, destroyed by the Nazis, makes a dramatic standing ruin.

== Notable people ==
- Gootchaux Ettinger (1836–1917), French-Brazilian Politician and industrialist

== See also ==
- Communes of the Bas-Rhin department
