= Do Sal River (Sergipe) =

Location
- Country: Brazil

Physical characteristics
- Source
  - location: Sergipe state

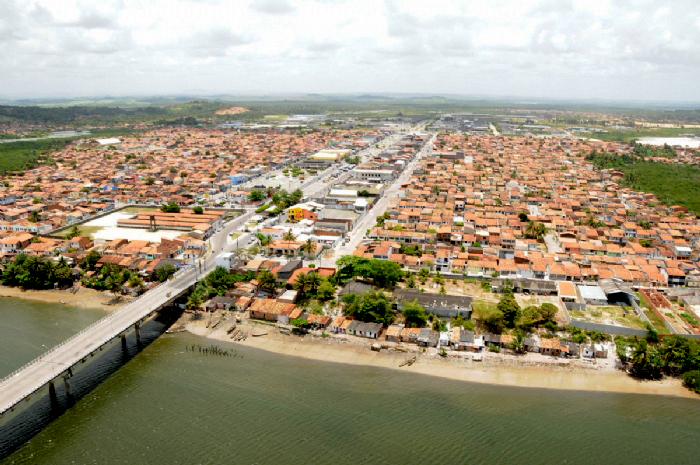
The Do Sal River in Nossa Senhora do Socorro, Sergipe, Brazil

The Do Sal River is a river of Sergipe state in northeastern Brazil.

== See also ==
- List of rivers of Sergipe
