= Cotinguiba River =

- Native name: Rio Cotinguiba (Portuguese)

Location
- Country: Brazil

Physical characteristics
- Source
  - location: Areia Branca
- Mouth
  - location: Nossa Senhora do Socorro
  - coordinates: 10°51′05″S 37°21′52″W
- Length: 50 km (31 mi)
- Basin size: 232.5 km^{2} (89.8 sq mi)

The Cotinguiba River (Portuguese: Rio Cotinguiba) is a river in Sergipe, a state in northeastern Brazil. Its source is between the municipalities of Areia Branca and Laranjeiras. It flows into the Sergipe River at the border of the municipalities of Laranjeiras and Nossa Senhora do Socorro. It is approximately 50 kilometres (31 mi) long with a basin of 232.5 square kilometres (89.8 mi^{2}). The Cotinguiba River is one of the main tributaries of the right bank of the Sergipe River, and flows into the Sergipe in a river bed in the form of an estuary. It passes through the municipalities of Areia Branca, Riachuelo, Laranjeiras and Nossa Senhora do Socorro.

The economy of the region of the Cotinguiba River was closely tied to the height and decline of sugarcane cultivation. After its decline, Laranjeiras alone remained prosperous due to its port. After the abolition of slavery in Brazil, the region went into economic decline and the Cotinguiba was no longer used for inland transportation.

== See also ==
- List of rivers of Sergipe
