= Salgado River (Vaza-Barris River tributary) =

River in Brazil

Location
- Country: Brazil

Physical characteristics
- Source
  - location: Sergipe state
- Mouth: Vaza-Barris River

The Salgado River is a river of Sergipe state in northeastern Brazil. It is a tributary of the Vaza-Barris River.

== See also ==
- List of rivers of Sergipe
