= Cachorro (disambiguation) =

Cachorro or Bear Cub is a 2004 Spanish comedy-drama film co-written and directed by Miguel Albaladejo.

Cachorro may also refer to:

- Cachorro (born 1998), previous ring name of a Mexican masked professional wrestler
- Cachorro Lagunero (born 2001), previous ring name of a Mexican masked professional wrestler
- Cachorro Grande, Brazilian rock band
- Cachorro López (born 1956), Argentine record producer, musician and songwriter
- Cachorro Mendoza (born 1955), ring name of a Mexican masked professional wrestler
- Los Cachorros (The Cubs), a 1973 Mexican film

== See also ==
- Cachorro River (disambiguation)
