= Jacaré River (Sergipe, São Francisco River tributary) =

Location
- Country: Brazil

Physical characteristics
- Source
  - location: Sergipe state
- Mouth: São Francisco River

The Jacaré River is a river of Sergipe state in northeastern Brazil. It is a tributary of the São Francisco River.

== See also ==
- List of rivers of Sergipe
