= Barra dos Coqueiros =

Municipality in Sergipe, Brazil

Coordinates: 10°54′32″S 37°02′20″W

- Municipality
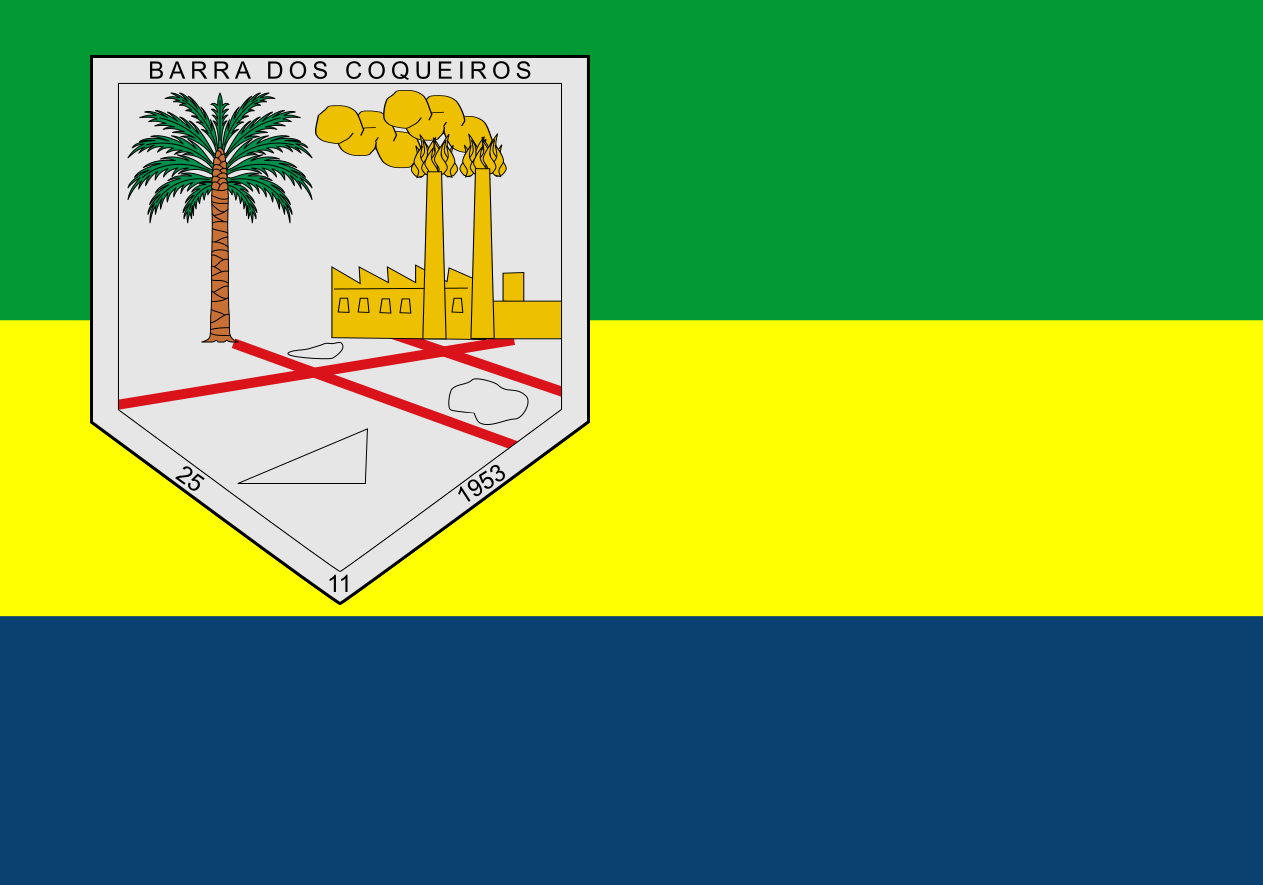
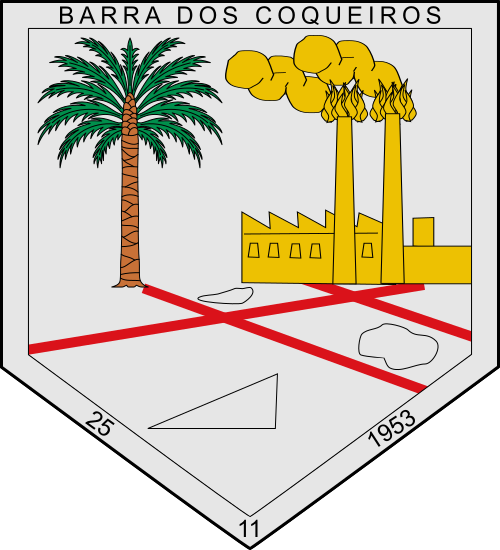
- Flag Coat of arms
- Interactive map of Barra dos Coqueiros
- Country: Brazil
- Time zone: UTC−3 (BRT)

Barra dos Coqueiros (Brazilian Portuguese: [ˈbaʁɐ dus koˈke(j)ɾus]) is a municipality Brazilian state of Sergipe. Its population was 30,930 (2020) and its area is 91 km^{2}.

== See also ==
- List of municipalities in Sergipe
