= Barra do Jacaré =

Coordinates: 23°07′S 50°11′W

- Municipality
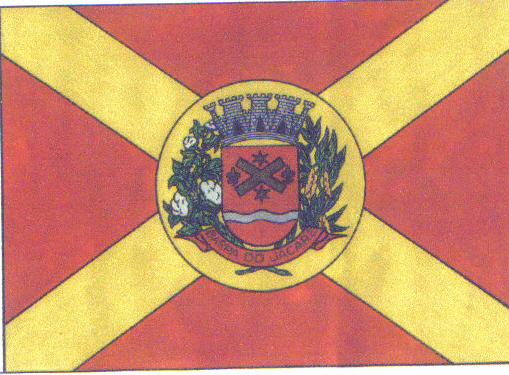
- Flag
- Interactive map of Barra do Jacaré
- Country: Brazil
- Region: Southern
- State: Paraná
- Mesoregion: Norte Pioneiro Paranaense

Population (2020)
  - Total: 2,781
- Time zone: UTC−3 (BRT)

Barra do Jacaré is a municipality in the state of Paraná in the Southern Region of Brazil.

== See also ==
- List of municipalities in Paraná
