= Pedra Mole =

Municipality in Sergipe, Brazil

Coordinates: 10°37′01″S 37°41′13″W

- Municipality
- Interactive map of Pedra Mole
- Country: Brazil
- Time zone: UTC−3 (BRT)

Pedra Mole (Brazilian Portuguese pronunciation: [ˈpɛdɾɐ ˈmɔli or ˈpɛdɐ ˈmɔli]) is a municipality located in the Brazilian state of Sergipe. Its population was 3,285 (2020) and its area is 82 km^{2} (32 sq mi).

== See also ==
- List of municipalities in Sergipe
