= Frei Paulo =

Municipality in Sergipe, Brazil

Frei Paulo Município de Frei Paulo
- Municipality
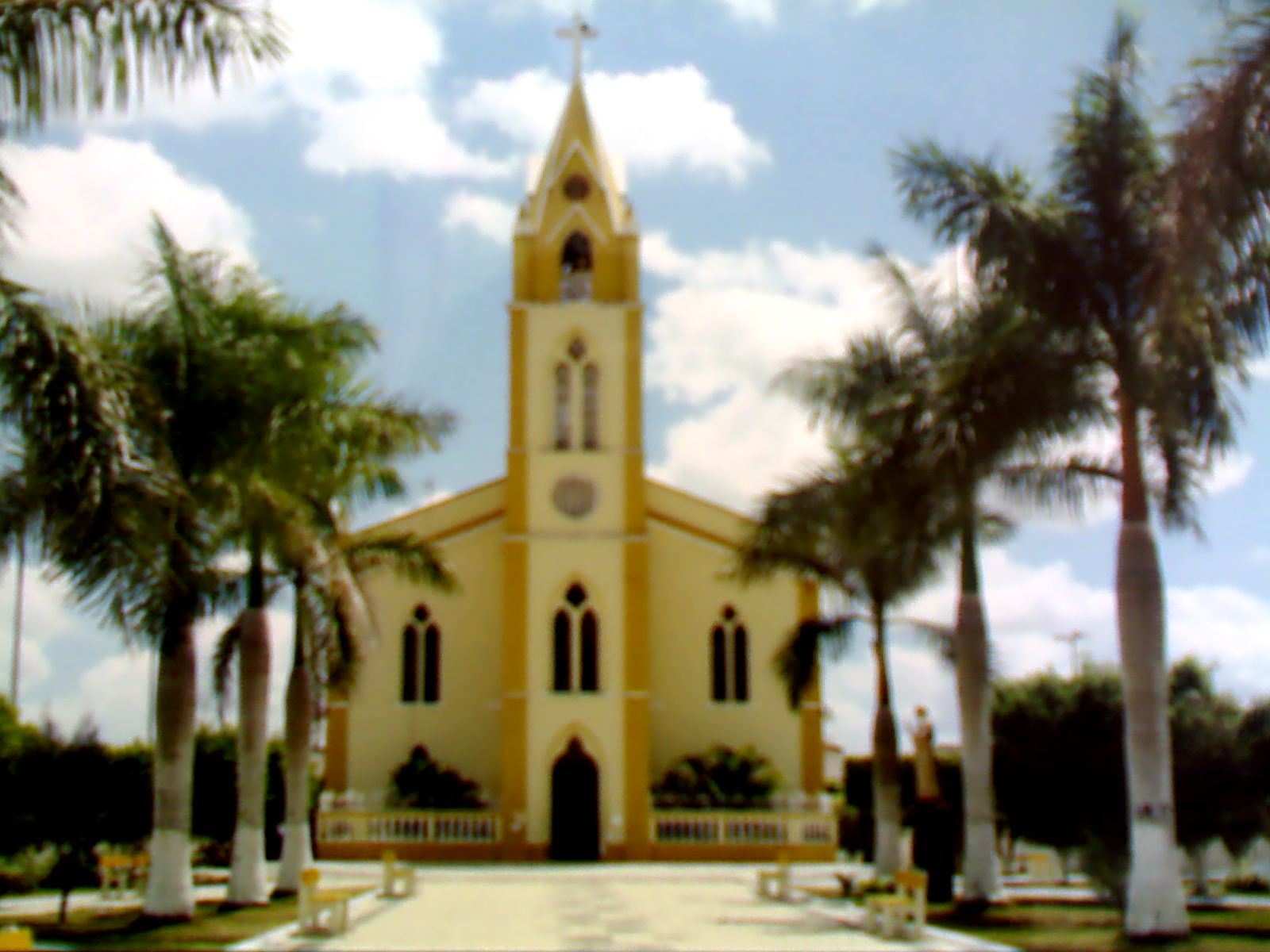
- Igreja Matriz de Frei Paulo, Praça São Paulo, Frei Paulo

- Flag Coat of arms

- Location of Frei Paulo in Sergipe

- Location of Frei Paulo in Brazil
- Coordinates: 10°32′56″S 37°32′02″W
- Country: Brazil
- Region: Northeast
- State: Sergipe
- Founded: October 23, 1890

Government
  - Mayor: José Arinaldo de Oliveira Filho

Area
  - Total: 400.4 km^{2} (154.6 sq mi)
- Elevation: 272 m (892 ft)

Population (2020)
  - Total: 15,556
  - Density: 38.85/km^{2} (100.6/sq mi)
- Demonym: Frei-paulense
- Time zone: UTC−3 (BRT)
- Website: freipaulo.se.gov.br

Frei Paulo (Brazilian Portuguese: [fɾej ˈpawlu]) is a municipality located in the Brazilian state of Sergipe. Its population was 15,556 (2020). Frei Paulo covers 400.4 km^{2} (154.6 mi^{2}), and has a population density of 38 inhabitants per square kilometer.

== See also ==
- List of municipalities in Sergipe
