= Sergipe River =

River in Brazil

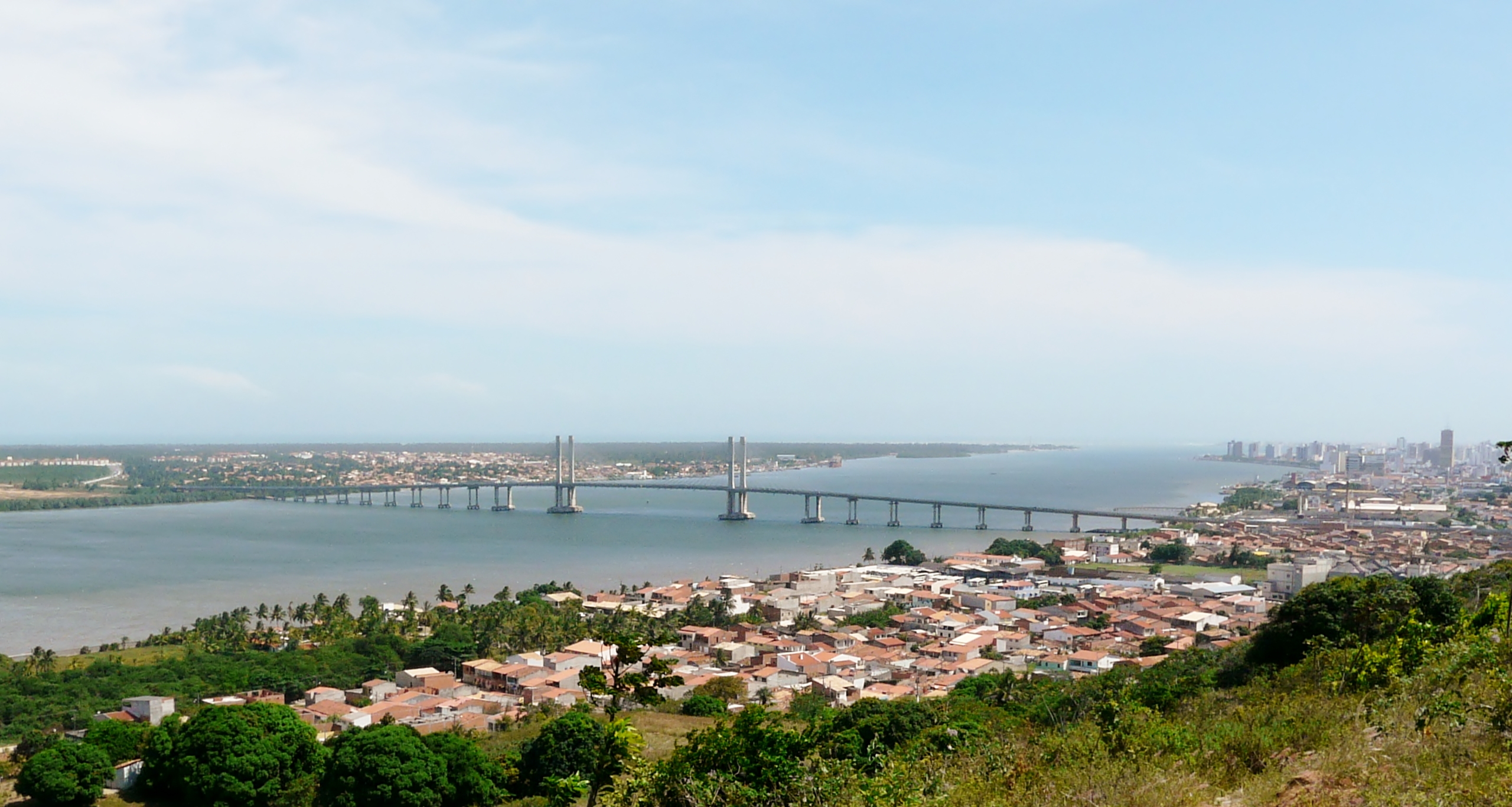
- Aracaju Barra Bridge over the Sergipe

- Location of mouth
- Native name: Rio Sergipe (Portuguese)

Location
- Country: Brazil
- State: Sergipe

Physical characteristics
- Source
  - location: Serra Negra Mountains
  - coordinates: 10°08′04.3″S 37°46′22.3″W
- Mouth
  - location: Aracaju, Barra dos Coqueiros
  - coordinates: 10°57′40″S 37°02′0″W
- Length: 210 km (130 mi)
- Basin size: 3.673 square kilometres (1.418 mi^{2})

The Sergipe River (Portuguese: Rio Sergipe) is a river of Sergipe state in northeastern Brazil.

== Geography ==
The Sergipe River begins in the Serra da Boa Vista in the state of Goias near the border with Sergipe and flows for approximately 207 km. Its watershed has an area of about 3,754 km², and is spread over about 26 municipalities, including Aracaju and many municipalities in the interior of Sergipe. The main tributaries include the rivers Poxim, Pitanga, Cotinguiba, Jacarecica, Sal, and Ganhamoroba. The Sergipe River flows into the Atlantic Ocean between Aracaju and Barra dos Coqueiros.

== See also ==
- List of rivers of Sergipe
