= Sergipe =

State of Brazil

- State
- Flag Coat of arms
- Motto: Sub Lege Libertas (Latin) ('Liberty under the law')
- Anthem: Hino de Sergipe
- Location in Brazil
- Coordinates: 10.56°S 37.36°W
- Country: Brazil
- Capital and largest city: Aracaju

Government
  - Type: Unitary state
  - Governor: Fábio Mitidieri (PSD)
  - Vice Governor: Zezinho Sobral (PSB)
  - Senators: Alessandro Vieira (MDB); Laercio Oliveira (PP); Rogério Carvalho (PT)
  - Legislature: Legislative Assembly of Sergipe

Area
  - Total: 21,910.4 km^{2} (8,459.7 sq mi)
  - Rank: 26th

Population (2022)
  - Total: 2,210,004
  - Rank: 22nd
  - Density: 100.866/km^{2} (261.241/sq mi)
  - Rank: 5th
- Demonym: Sergipano

GDP (2024)
  - Total: R$67.862 billion (US$12.593 billion)

HDI
  - Year: 2024
  - Category: 0.761 – high (20th)
- Time zone: UTC-3 (BRT)
- Postal Code: 49000-000 to 49990-000
- ISO 3166 code: BR-SE
- Website: www.se.gov.br

Sergipe (English: /ˌsɛərˈʒiːpi/, sair-ZHEE-pee; Brazilian Portuguese: [sɛʁˈʒipi]), officially the State of Sergipe, is a state of Brazil. Located in the Northeast Region along the Atlantic coast of the country, Sergipe is the smallest state in Brazil by geographical area at 21,910 square kilometres (8,460 mi^{2}), larger only than the Federal District. Sergipe borders Bahia to the south and west and Alagoas to the north. Aracaju is the capital and the largest city in the state; the state is divided into 75 municipalities. The state has 1.1% of the Brazilian population and produces 0.6% of the Brazilian GDP.

== Geography ==
As with most of the states in northeastern Brazil, inland Sergipe is almost entirely savanna (caatinga), and its coastline is characterized by mangroves, swamps and sandy beaches. A small strip of tropical rainforest runs down the coast.

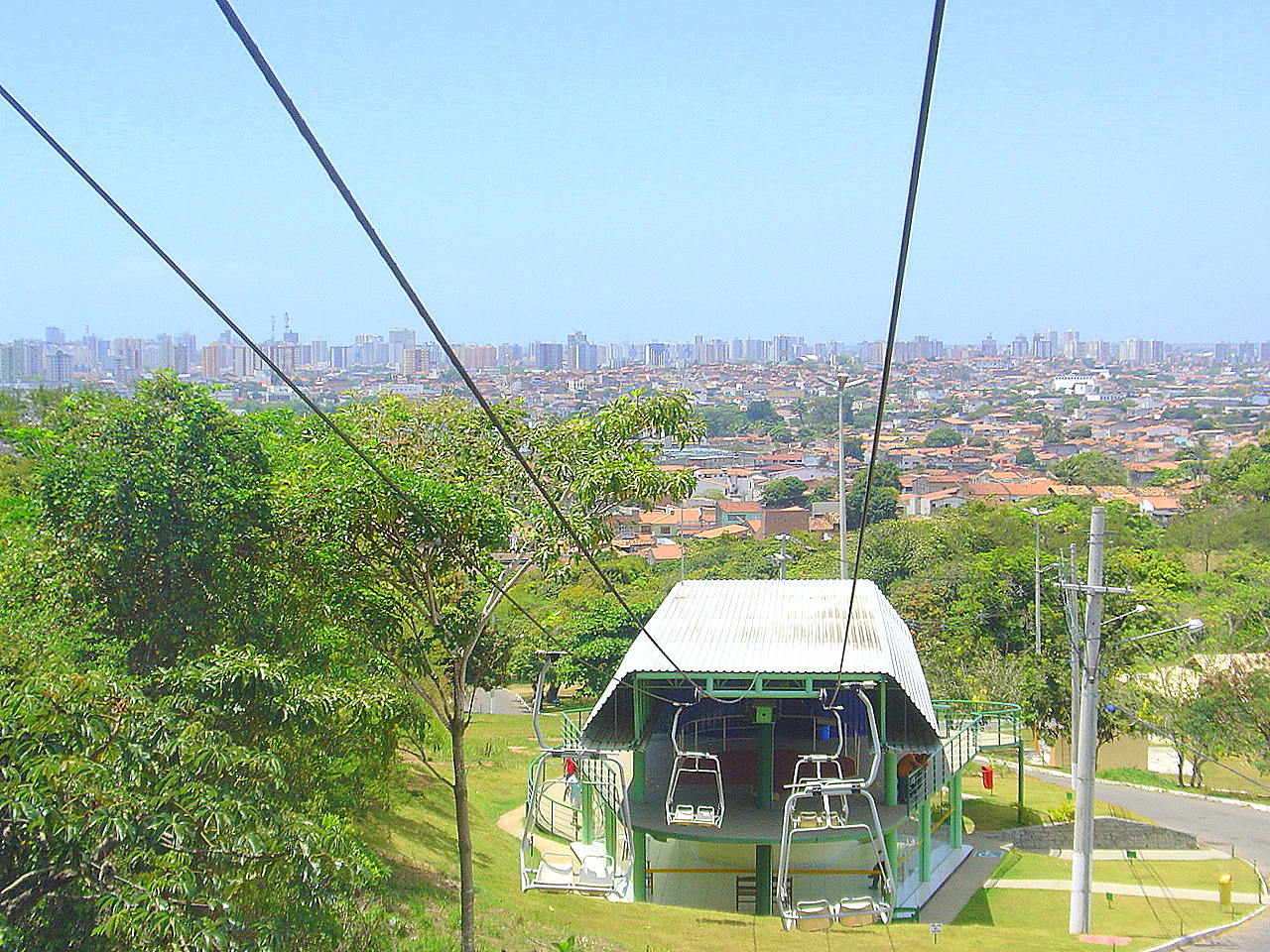
Aerial tramway in Aracaju

The São Francisco River forms its northern boundary, and the drainage of the northern part of the state is northward and eastward to that river. The southern half of the state slopes eastward and is drained directly into the Atlantic through a number of small rivers, the largest of which are the Irapiranga (whose source in the state of Bahia is called Vaza Barris), the Real and the Cotinguiba. These streams are navigable for short distances, but are obstructed by sandbars at their mouths; because of these, there are no good ports on the coast. The surface of the state resembles, in part, that of Bahia, with a zone of forested lands near the coast and beyond this forested zone lies a higher zone of rough open country, called agreste. There is a sandy belt along the coast, and the western frontier is slightly mountainous. The land in between is very fertile, especially in the forested region where rainfall is abundant. Further inland, the year is divided into wet and dry seasons with occasional prolonged droughts. These are pastoral areas, and the lower fertile lands are cultivated.

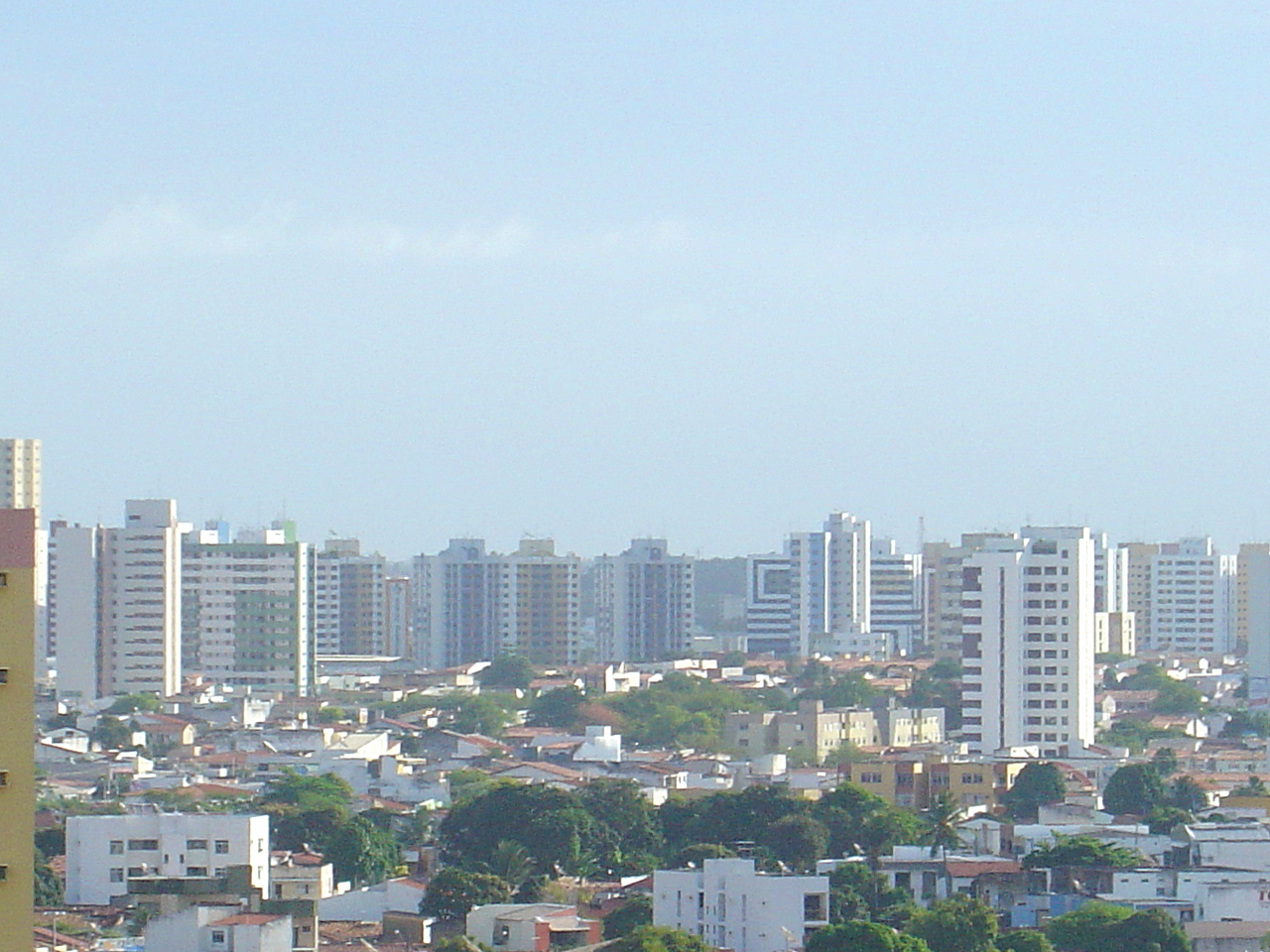
Skyline of Aracaju

The capital of the state is Aracaju (pop. 479 767 in 2003), on the lower course or estuary of the Cotinguiba River, near the coast. The sandbar at the entrance to this river is exceptionally dangerous, and the port is frequented only by coasting vessels of light draught. The city is found on a sandy plain, and there are sand dunes within the city limits. In 1911, the main public buildings included a large plain church with unfinished twin towers, the government palace, the legislative halls, a public school and public hospital.

The other principal towns are Estância - pop. 62,218 (in 2005) on the Rio Real river in the southern part of the state and a center for the manufacturing of cotton-based textiles, cigars, cigarettes and soap as well as an active trade center; Laranjeiras - pop. 26,452 (in 2005), located in a highly productive sugar-growing district north of the capital; Capela - pop. 27,403 (in 2005); Simão Dias - pop. 39,706 (in 2005); Lagarto - pop. 90,345 (in 2005); São Cristóvão, formerly Sergipe d'el-Rey - pop. 75,353 (in 2005), which was also the old colonial capital near the mouth of the Irapiranga.

== Etymology ==
The name Sergipe originates from an Old Tupi word, Siriîype, meaning "in the river of the siri" (a species of crab) or "river of crabs". It combines siri ("crab") + pe ("in/on/river") and originally designated the Sergipe River.

An alternative tradition holds that the river and the state were named after Serigy, a local Indigenous chief.

== History ==
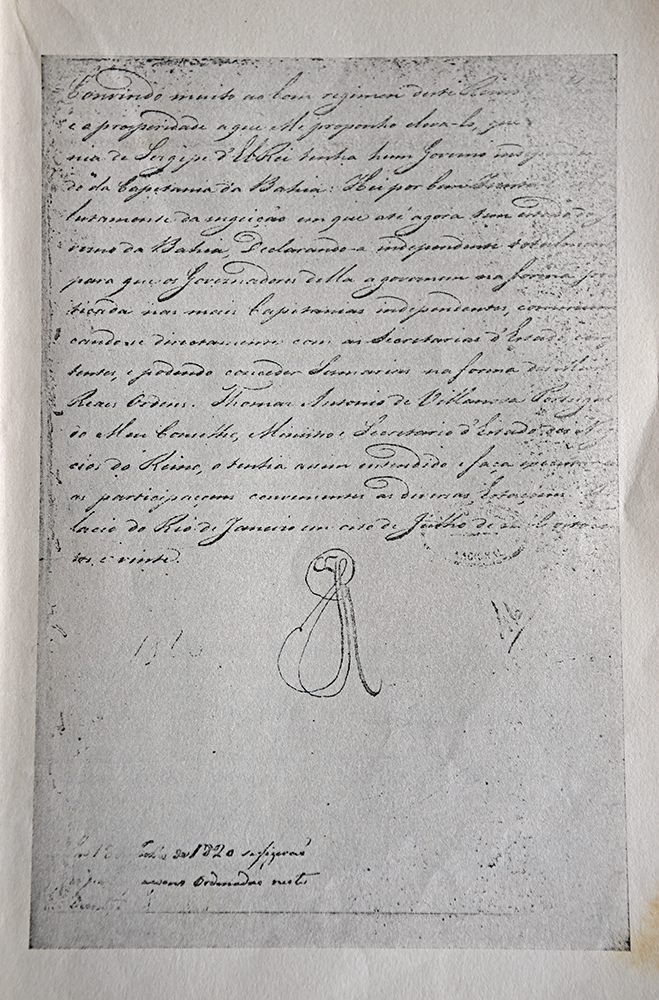
Royal decree of King John VI, granting the administrative emancipation of the Captaincy of Sergipe on July 8, 1820

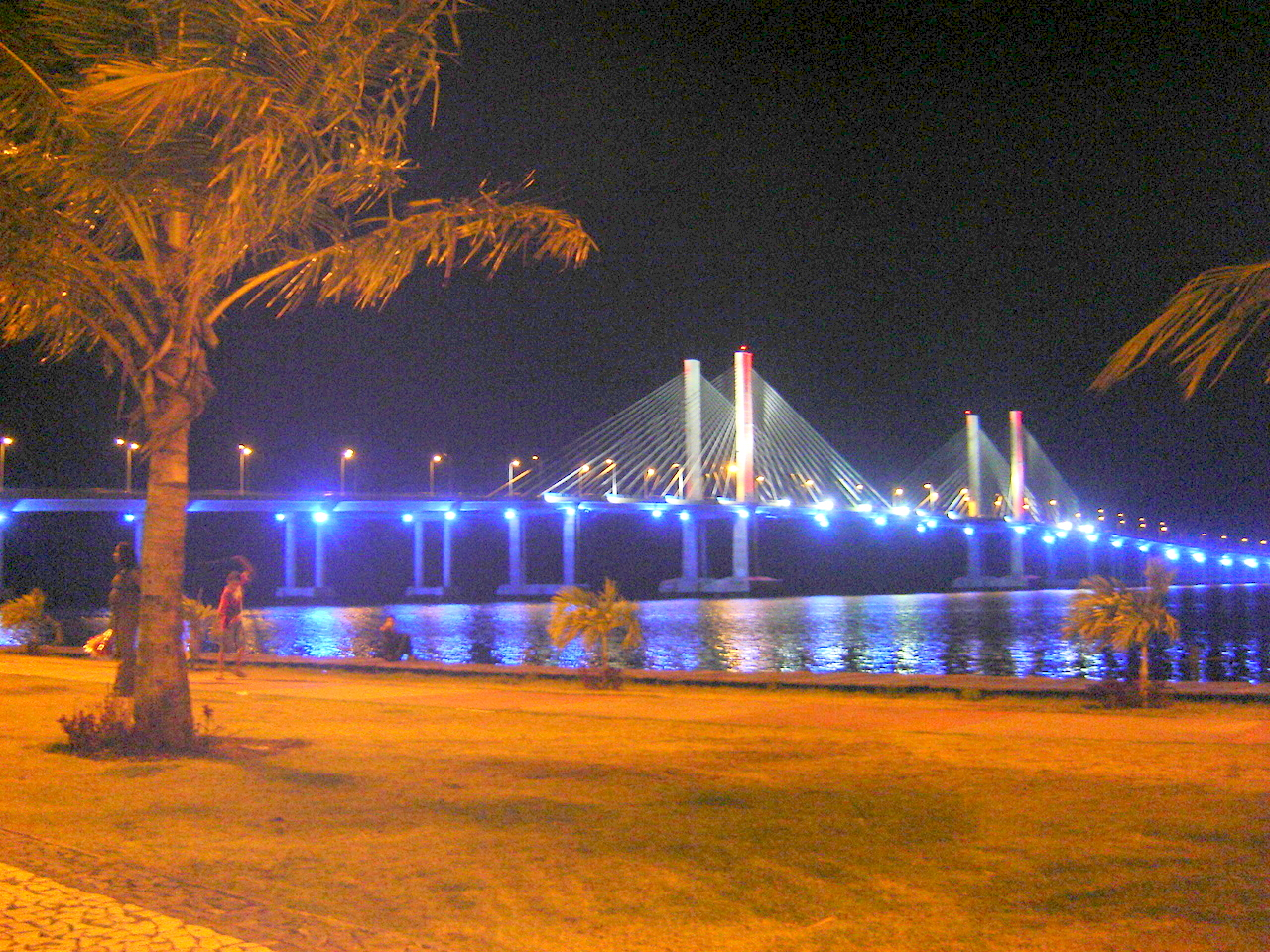
Aracaju-Barra Bridge at night

Present-day Sergipe was home to numerous indigenous peoples, including the Kanindé (Canindé), Aratus, and Tupi peoples. Gaspar de Lemos briefly landed in the region in 1501, and the Portuguese Crown declared the region part of the Captaincy of Bahia. The area of Sergipe was one of the last coastal regions of Brazil whose indigenous population (consisting of Tupinambá tribes) resisted subjugation to Portuguese colonial rule. The area was fully brought under Portuguese rule after approximately two decades of warfare during which thousands of natives were murdered and thousands more enslaved to work on sugar plantations. São Cristóvão was the site of the first Portuguese settlement, in 1591, at Sergipe D'El-Rey.

As with other states in the northeast, Sergipe was invaded numerous times by the Dutch, and frequently raided by French buccaneers. During the 17th century, the state was known throughout the Americas for its king-wood, a prized commodity that was the primary attraction during the buccaneer raids, and probably a factor in Dutch military expeditions. From 1641 to 1645, the territory belonged to Dutch-controlled Brazil (New Holland). The Dutch built a fort, the first in the region, between the rivers São Francisco and Sergipe.

The Portuguese regained control in 1645. By the 18th century, the Portuguese military had driven off the pirates permanently. Sergipe remained a part of the state of Bahia, and was responsible for a third of Bahia's sugar production by 1723. Sugarcane culture was established in the valleys of the São Francisco, Japaratuba, Sergipe, Vaza-Barris, Piauí and Real rivers. Areas unsuitable for sugarcane plantations on the coast and in the hinterland were developed for livestock; Sergipe subsequently became a supplier of draft animals for the farms of Bahia and Pernambuco. The region was also a significant producer of leather. John VI of Portugal signed a decree to separated Sergipe from Bahia on July 8, 1820, and Brigadier Carlos César Burlamárqui was named the state's first governor.

Sergipe retained its separation from Bahia after the Independence of Brazil in 1822, first briefly as the Captaincy of Sergipe, then as the Province of Sergipe. Economic development was low during the Empire of Brazil in the 19th century, other than a brief cotton boom in the second half of the century. The provincial president Inácio Joaquim Barbosa moved the capital from inland São Cristóvão to coastal Aracaju on the coast on March 17, 1855. Sergipe became a state under the proclamation of the Republic of Brazil in 1892.

=== 20th century ===
The state saw bitter political disputes in the early 20th century, notably between Fausto Cardoso (1864-1906) and Olímpio Campos. Sergipe became notorious for its outlaws in the 1930s, including Virgolino Ferreira da Silva, better known as Lampião, the "King of Bandits", who terrorized the state for almost a decade until his beheading by the Brazilian police in 1938. His head was later displayed on a pole in a village square.

Coastal Sergipe was attacked by Nazi Germany at the beginning of World War II in response to the rupture of relations between Brazil and the Axis powers. The German submarine U-507, commanded by Harro Schacht, attacked Baependy, Araraquara, and Aníbal Benévolo off Sergipe between August 15 and 16, 1942. The shipwrecks caused approximately 600 civilian deaths, and German and Italian immigrants communities in Sergipe were persecuted after the attack by mobs. The attacks of the U-507 prompted President Getúlio Vargas to declare war on Germany and Italy on August 22 of the same year.

== Demographics ==
According to the 2022 census, there were 2,210,004 people residing in the state. The population density was 100.7 inhabitants/km^{2}.

Urbanization: 82.2% (2006); Population growth: 2% (1991–2000); Houses: 569,000 (2006).

The 2022 census revealed the following numbers: 1,361,504 Brown (Multiracial) people (61.6%), 556,908 White people (25.2%), 283,960 Black people (12.8%), 4,580 Amerindian people (0.2%), 2,978 Asian people (0.1%).

Historical population
Year	Pop.	±%
1872	176,243	—
1890	310,926	+76.4%
1900	356,264	+14.6%
1920	477,064	+33.9%
1940	542,326	+13.7%
1950	644,361	+18.8%
1960	760,273	+18.0%
1970	911,251	+19.9%
1980	1,156,642	+26.9%
1991	1,491,867	+29.0%
2000	1,784,829	+19.6%
2010	2,068,017	+15.9%
2022	2,210,004	+6.9%

=== Religion ===
Religion in Sergipe (2010)
1. Catholic Church (76.4%)
2. Protestantism (11.8%)
3. Irreligion (8.60%)
4. Spiritism (1.10%)
5. Others (2.10%)

According to the 2010 demographic census, of the total population of the state, there were 1,579,480 Catholics, 243,330 Protestants Evangelicals, 22,266 Spiritists, 14,755 Jehovah's Witnesses, 6,500 other Christian groups, 5,394 Brazilian Catholic Apostolic Church, 4,371 Umbanda and Candomblecist, 2,326 Mormons, 709 Eastern Orthodox Christians, 509 Buddhists, 501 Spiritualists, 493 Esoteric, 435 belonging to indigenous traditions, 433 new Eastern religious, 184 Jewish and 22 Islamic. There were still 177,620 people without religion, 5,005 with indeterminate (ill-defined) religion or multiple membership, 3,240 did not know and 405 did not declare.

=== Education ===
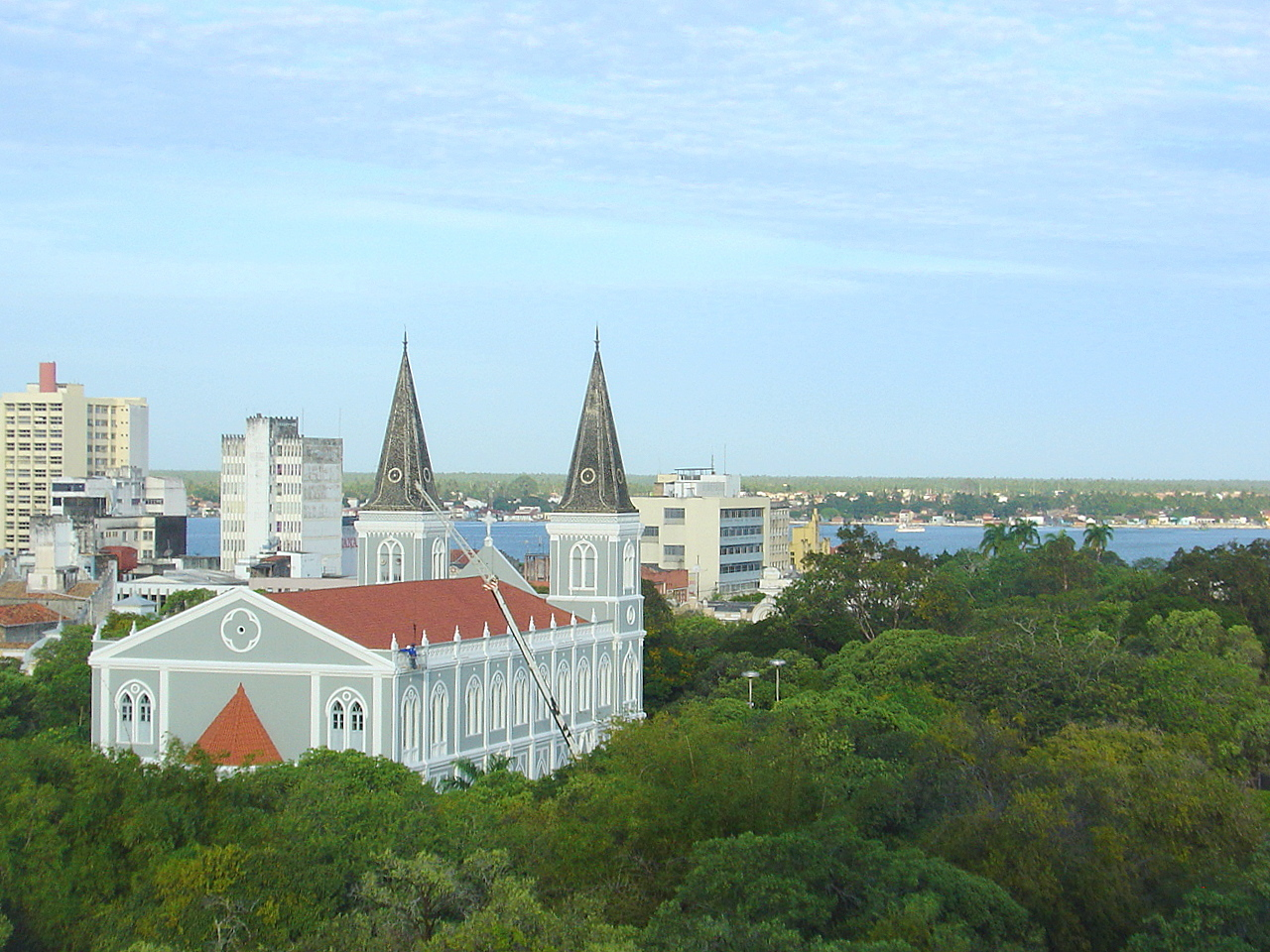
Aracaju is the most important educational centre of the state.

Portuguese is the official national language, and thus the primary language taught in schools, but English and Spanish are part of the official high school curriculum.

==== Educational institutions ====
- Universidade Federal de Sergipe (UFS);
- Instituto Federal de Educação, Ciência e Tecnologia (IFS);
- Universidade Tiradentes (Unit);
- Faculdade Pio Décimo (FPD);
- Faculdade Estácio de Sergipe (ESTÁCIO);
- Faculdade de Administração e Negócios de Sergipe (FANESE);
- Faculdade Amadeus (FAMA);
- Faculdade São Luis de França (FSLF);
- Faculdade Sergipana (FASER);
- Faculdade de Aracaju (FACAR);
- Faculdade Serigy (UNIRB);
- Faculdade Jardins (FAJAR);
- Faculdade Maurício de Nassau (UNINASSAU);

== Economy ==
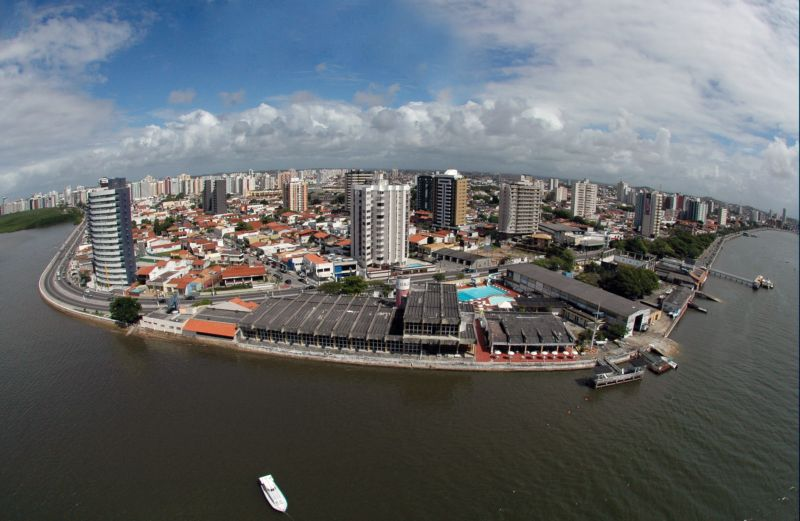
Aracaju is the largest city of the state.

The industrial sector is the largest component of GDP at 53.9%, followed by the service sector at 39.1%. Agriculture represents 7% of GDP (2004). Sergipe exports include: orange juice 66.1%, urea 20.8%, leather and footwear 4.6%, woven goods 2.3%, other types of juices 2% (2002).

Sergipe's share of the Brazilian economy: 0.7% (2004).

Sergipe's economy is focused around the production of sugarcane (more than 2 million tons produced in 2018, for the manufacture of sugar and ethanol), coconut (2nd largest producer in Brazil in 2017, with 234 million fruits), orange (6th largest producer in Brazil in 2018, with 354 thousand tons) and cassava (153 thousand tons produced in 2018). A small-scale leather and textile industry also exists.

Sergipe had in 2017 an industrial GDP of R$7 billion, equivalent to 0.6% of the national industry. It employs 67,231 workers in the industry. The main industrial sectors are: Construction (33.1%), Industrial Public Utility Services, such as Electricity and Water (29.0%), Food (9.9%), Non-metallic minerals (2.8%) and Chemicals (2.2%). These 5 sectors concentrate 77.0% of the state's industry.

The Brazilian federal government is also encouraging the development of a fledgling petroleum and natural gas industry.

== Notable residents ==
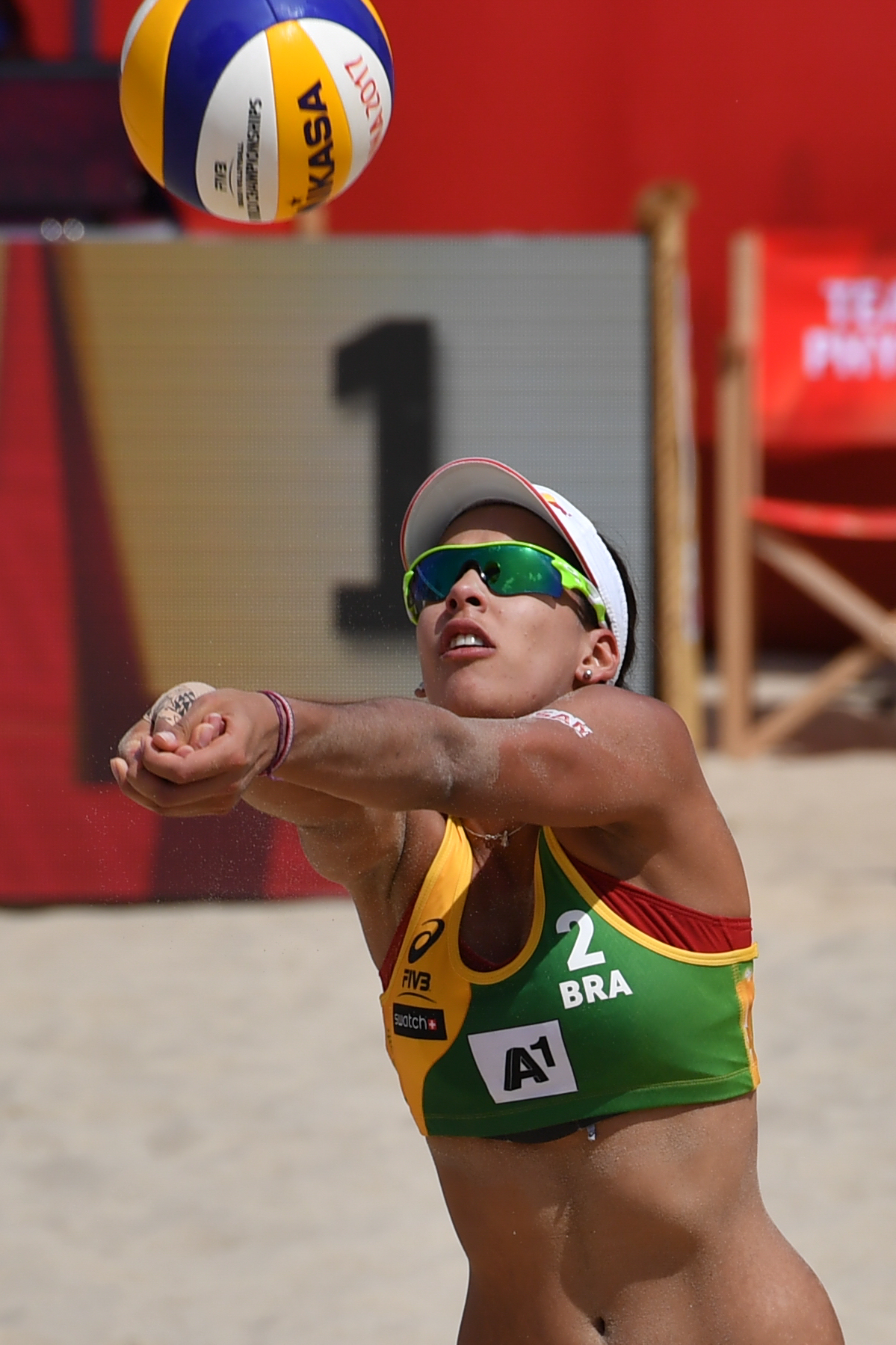
Duda, beach volleyball player, World Champion

- Maguila (1958–): professional boxer, former WBF heavyweight World Champion, former WBC Continental Americas heavyweight champion
- Duda (1998-): beach volleyball player, World Champion and gold medalist at the 2024 Summer Olympics.
- Carlos Ayres Britto (1942-): judge, poet, President of Brazil's Supreme Court and of the National Justice Council (2012)
- Kelson Pinto (1976-): former professional boxer, gold medallist at the 1999 Pan American Games
- Adilson (1976-): former brazilian footballer
- Geuvânio (1992–): former brazilian footballer
- Matheus (1983-): brazilian footballer
- Joãozinho (1988-): brazilian footballer
- Paulo César (1986-): brazilian footballer
- Victor Andrade (1995-): brazilian footballer
- Leandro dos Santos (1993): brazilian volleyball player, bronze medallist at the 2022 FIVB Volleyball World Championships
- Rogério Alves (1973): futsal player, champion of the 2008 FIFA Futsal World Cup
- Zé Gabriel (1999–), Brazilian footballer
- Detinho (1973–), Brazilian footballer
- José Ronaldo do Nascimento (1966–), Brazilian handball player, gold medallist at the 2003 Pan American Games
- Moniky Bancilon (1990–), Brazilian handball player, gold medallist at the 2011 Pan American Games
- Clodoaldo Tavares de Santana (1949), ex-footballer who played for Brazil
- José Martins Ribeiro Nunes (Zé Peixe) (1927–2012), legendary figure who drove the boats through the river by swimming
- Diego Costa (1988), footballer who played for Chelsea F.C.
- João Batista Nunes de Oliveira (1954), ex-footballer of Clube de Regatas Flamengo where he won the Libertadores, Mundial of clubs at 1981 and many others championships

== Infrastructure ==
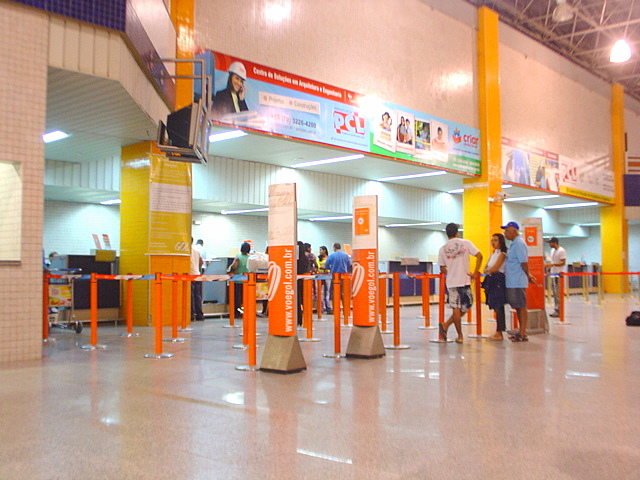
International Airport of Aracaju

=== Airport ===
Aracaju–Santa Maria International Airport was inaugurated on October 30, 1952 with a runway only 1200 meters in length; the airport did not have an access road until 1958, so after construction of one operating efficiency increased. In 1961 the runway was extended to 1500 meters and a passenger terminal was built in 1962. In February 1975 control of the airport was handed over to Infraero. The airport's runways reached their current configuration of 2,200 meters in length in 1993. The passenger terminal also underwent several changes and, in 1998, Aracaju gained a new building, measuring 10 thousand square meters. Santa Maria Airport began to be managed by Aena Brasil in 2020, after the company won the concessions auction of the National Civil Aviation Agency (Anac), held in 2019.

=== Highways ===
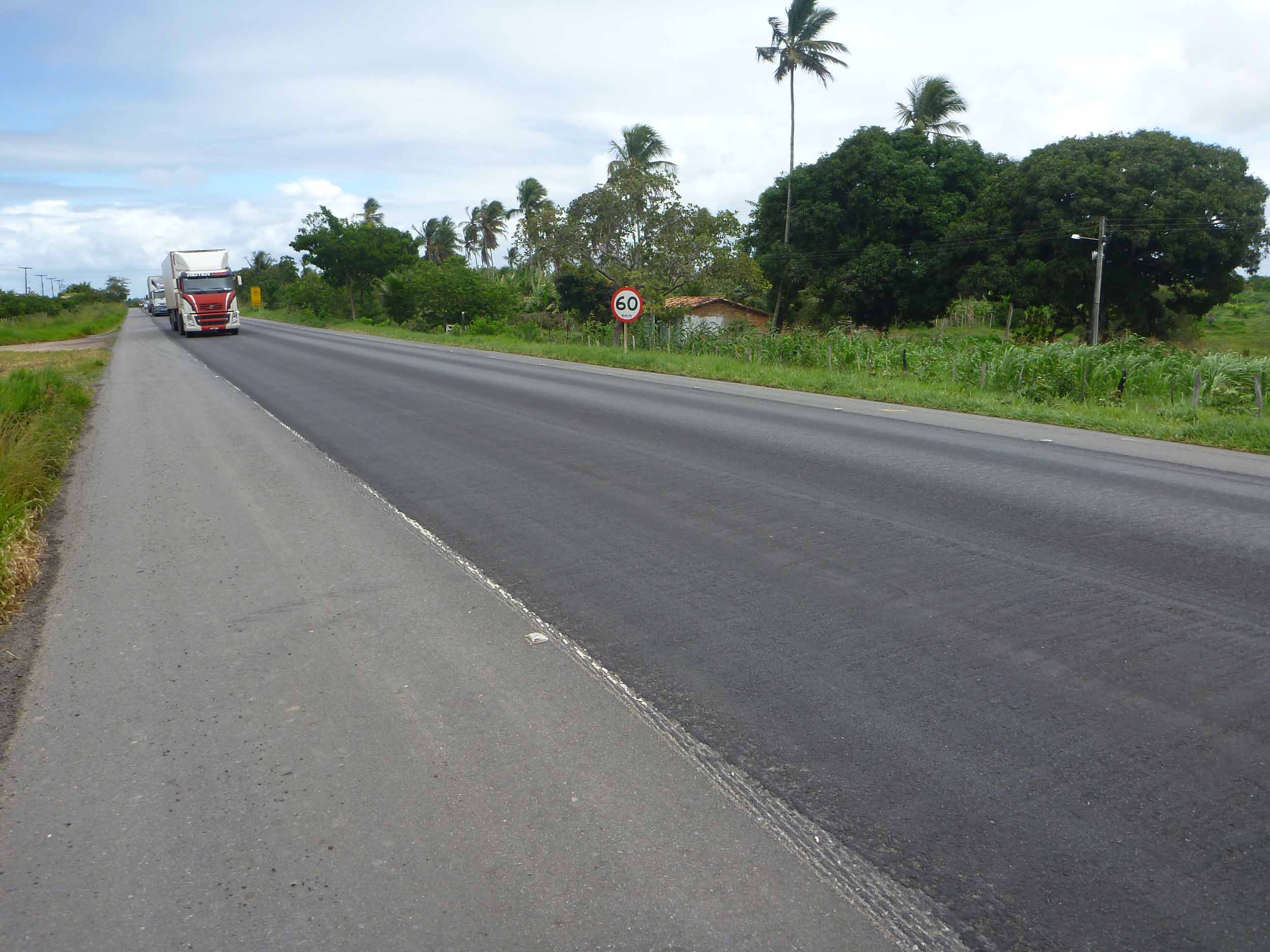
BR-101 in Sergipe, 2012, before the duplication

The main highways in Sergipe are BR-101, BR-235 and BR-349. BR-101, which belongs to the Brazilian Federal Government, has been receiving duplication works since 1997, and 27 years later, in 2024, they have not yet been completed in Sergipe. With 206 kilometers long, BR-101 is considered the main highway for those traveling through the state. It connects states in the Northeast and is one of the most used to reach the capital Aracaju. BR-101 moves the state's wealth, as it is the way to transport the sugar cane that is produced in the region, and to transport iron ore that comes from Bahia to the Port of Sergipe.

=== Ports ===
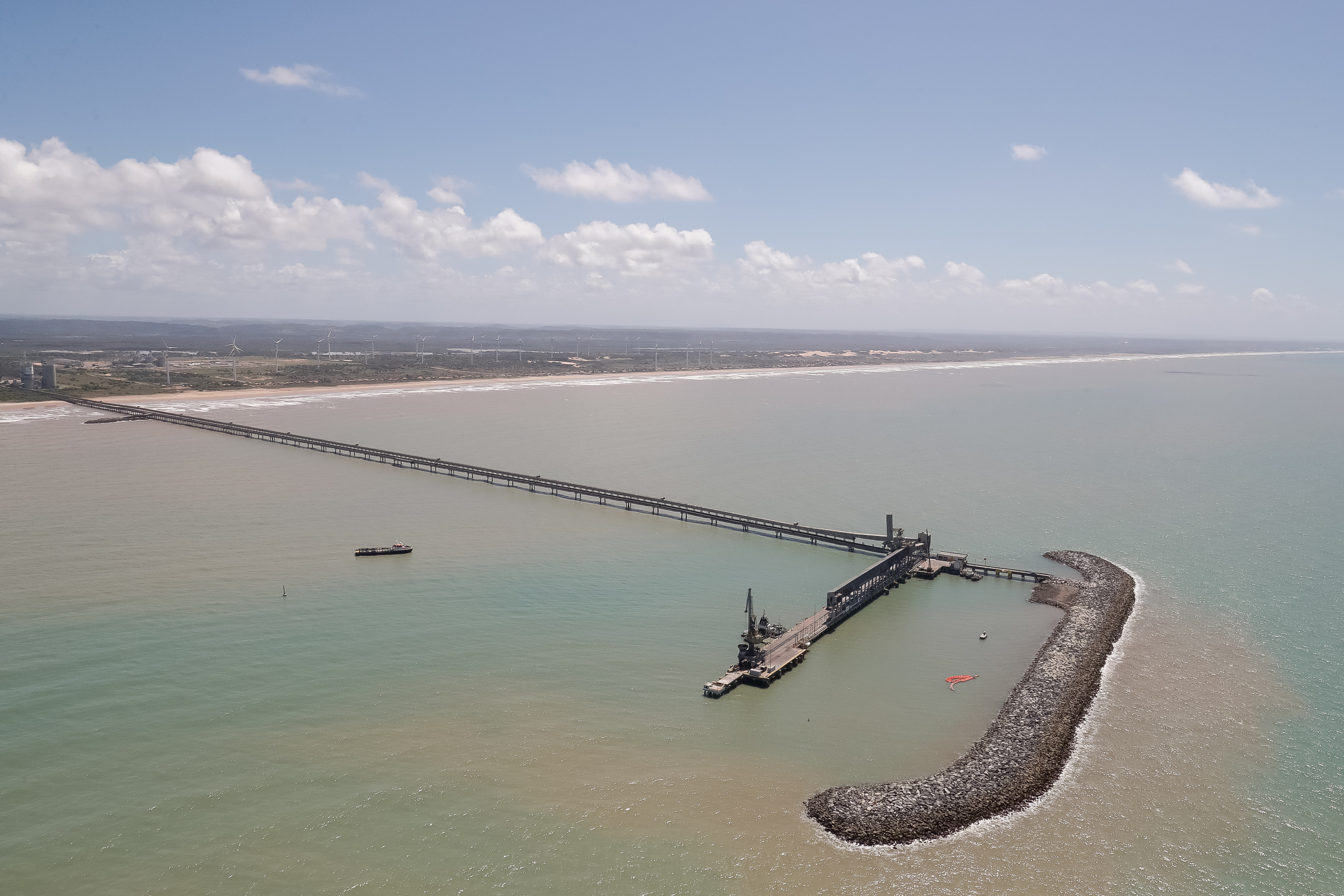
Port of Sergipe

The Inácio Barbosa Maritime Terminal - TMIB, popularly known as Porto da Barra dos Coqueiros or Porto de Sergipe, is located in the Brazilian municipality of Barra dos Coqueiros, in the Metropolitan Region of Aracaju, in Sergipe. It is the only port terminal in the state. It's a private off-shore, mixed-use, general cargo port terminal specialized in grain movement. It has a draft of 10.5 meters and its main advantage is a backport area of 2 million m^{2} for the installation of new projects, of which 800 thousand m^{2} are already bonded. In the same region of the port is also located the Barra dos Coqueiros wind farm operated by Statkraft with an installed capacity of 35MW and the Porto de Sergipe Thermoelectric Complex, the largest LNG thermoelectric plant in Brazil and Latin America, operated by Eneva with an installed capacity of 1.6GW.

== Sports ==
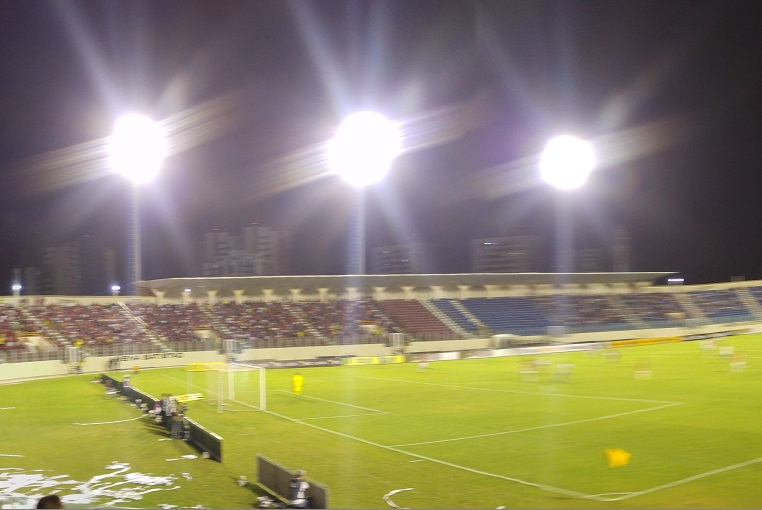
Batistão stadium in Aracaju

The state has many professional association football teams, like Club Sportivo Sergipe, Associação Desportiva Confiança from the town of Aracaju and Associação Olímpica de Itabaiana from the town of Itabaiana. Lagarto Futebol Clube is another important club in Sergipe, it's from Lagarto, city where the Brazilian-born and Spanish-naturalized footballer Diego Costa was born.

== Tourism and recreation ==
=== São Cristóvão ===
São Cristóvão is the fourth oldest town in the country, and was Sergipe's state capital until 1855. It is located some 25 km (16 mi) from the current capital Aracaju.

As a planned urban settlement, the town contains churches and religious ensembles dating back to the colonial period. Most of these monuments are concentrated around the São Francisco Square.

In 1939, São Cristóvão was designated as a National Treasure by the Instituto do Patrimônio Histórico e Artístico Nacional — IPHAN (the Brazilian National Historical and Artistical Heritage Institute). More recently, in 2010, São Francisco Square in the Town of São Cristóvão became a UNESCO World Heritage Site.

=== Xingó Canyon ===
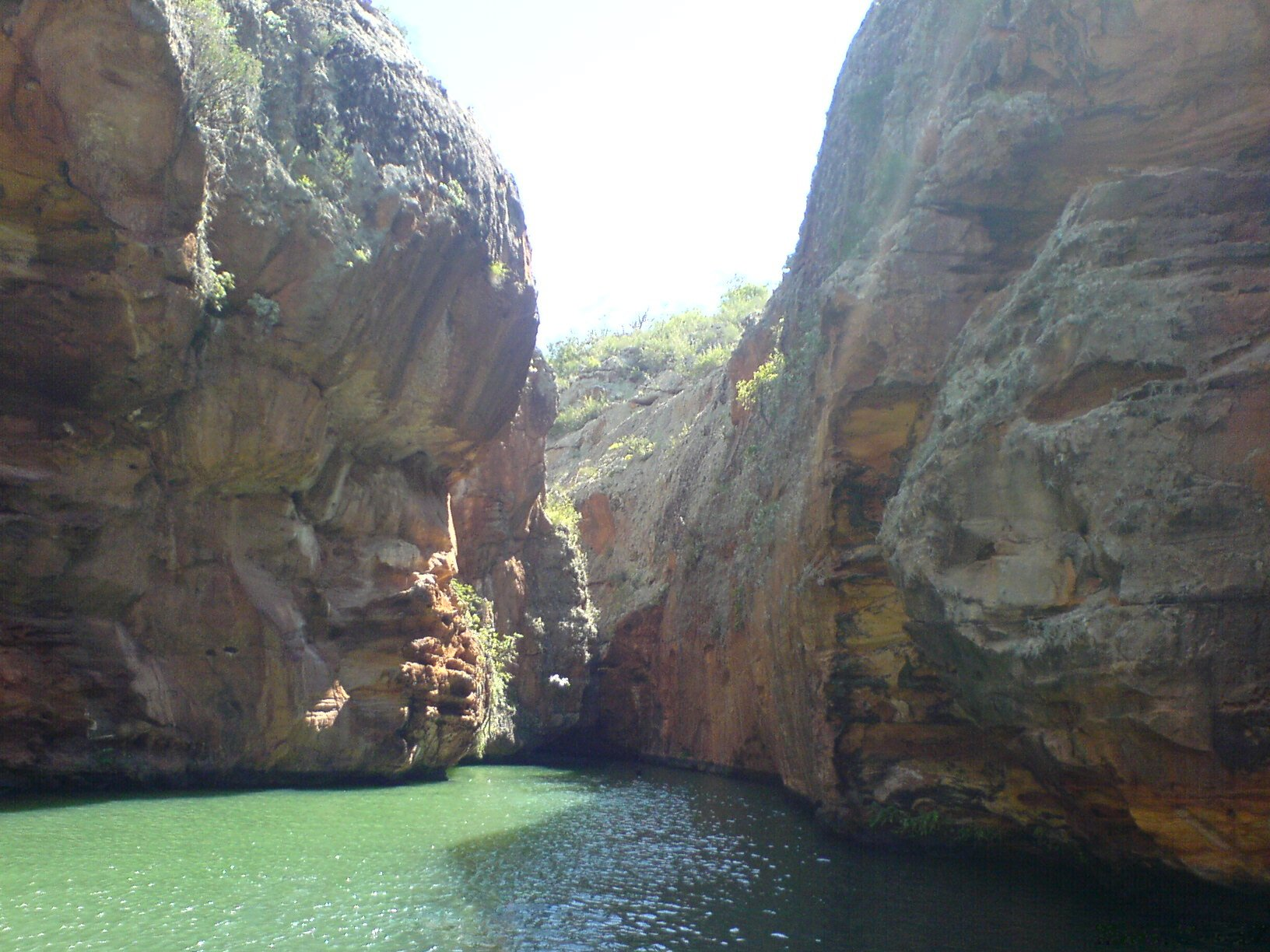
Xingó Canyon

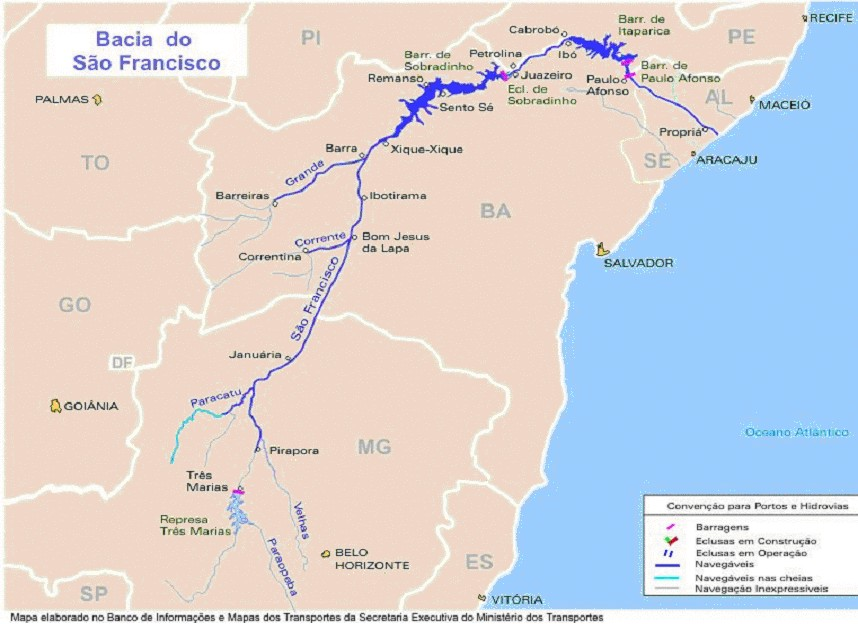
São Francisco river

Includes fascinating landscape, rock formations, crystal-clear waters, ecological trails, Caatinga Theme Park, exuberant vegetation and diversified fauna and flora. The Xingó Canyon is located in Canindé do São Francisco, on the banks of the lengthy and well-known São Francisco river. It is the world's fifth most navigable river. The river is formed in a valley reaching up to 170 m deep, being 65 km long and at certain locations between 50 and 300 m wide. The water volume of the canyon is about 3.8 billion m^{3}.

Navigating between the rocks of this cliff, located in Sergipe's Alto Sertão, involves valleys forming a 50 m-high canyon surrounding a lake that reaches a depth of 190 m in certain points. The area includes nests of herons and river islands. The rocks contain traces of the area's first inhabitants who lived there more than 8,000 years ago.

There is also evidence of Lampião's stay there, with his gang of outlaws in more modern times. The Angico trail, in Poço Redondo, leads to a cavern by the same name, where Lampião, Maria Bonita and nine other outlaws lost their lives. Located in the town of Canindé do São Francisco, 213 km (132 mi) from Aracaju, Xingó Canyon is one of the most famous rock formations in the area, embellishing the landscape of the dry Northeastern backwoods. It is hot all year round, but strong winds blowing from December to January keep temperatures at a very comfortable level. Between May and August, it rains frequently.

=== Sergipe Beaches ===
Sergipe has an extensive coastline, with clear and greenish waters and white sand which attract tourists from Brazil and abroad. The capital Aracaju also stands out for Praia de Atalaia which is considered the beach with the best beach sidewalk in Brazil. Outside the capital, the coast of Sergipe is highly valued for its distinctive aspect: Praia do Saco (municipality of Estância), a beach located in the south of the state was considered one of the 100 best beaches in the world by the French magazine Les Voyageurs. In it the tourist is faced with sand dunes and an extensive coastal strip that has the peculiarity of Sergipe; Praia da Costa (Barra dos Coqueiros), the Delta of the São Francisco River (Brejo Grande), Praia de Pirambu (Pirambu), are other beaches that enhance the state's tourism.

The river beaches, such as the Croa do Goré sandbar and Ilha dos Namorados, which are tourist attractions reached by Catamaran on the Vaza Barris River in Aracaju, can also be highlighted.

== Flag ==
The stars on the flag of Sergipe represent the number of river estuaries in the state, and the green and yellow stripes represent Sergipe's union with the rest of Brazil. It was designed by José Rodrigues Bastos Coelho, a businessman who felt that Brazilian ships should carry flags to identify their state of origin. It was officially adopted on October 19, 1920.

In 1937, dictator Getúlio Vargas abolished all state flags and symbols, but they were allowed again in 1946. In 1951, when the Sergipe legislature began to consider restoring the state flag, it decided to change the number of stars, so that there would be one for every municipality in the state. In 1952, this new design was scrapped and replaced by the original 5-star design.

== See also ==
- List of municipalities in Sergipe
- List of villages in Sergipe
