= Parish Church of Nossa Senhora do Socorro =

Church building in Nossa Senhora do Socorro, Brazil

- Igreja Matriz de Nossa Senhora do Perpétuo Socorro
- Location of the Parish Church of Nossa Senhora do Socorro in Brazil

Religion
- Affiliation: Catholic
- Rite: Roman Rite
- Patron: Our Lady of Perpetual Help

Location
- Municipality: Nossa Senhora do Socorro
- State: Sergipe
- Country: Brazil
- Interactive map of Parish Church of Nossa Senhora do Socorro
- Administration: Roman Catholic Archdiocese of Aracaju
- Coordinates: 10.852503°S 37.127145°W

Architecture
- Style: Baroque
- Completed: 18th century
- Direction of façade: South

National Historic Heritage of Brazil
- Designated: 1943
- Reference no.: 675

The Parish Church of Nossa Senhora do Socorro (Portuguese: Igreja Matriz de Nossa Senhora do Perpétuo Socorro or Igreja Matriz de Nossa Senhora do Socorro) is an 18th-century Roman Catholic church in Nossa Senhora do Socorro, Sergipe, Brazil. It is dedicated to is dedicated to Our Lady of Perpetual Help and is owned by the Roman Catholic Archdiocese of Aracaju. It was likely built by the Jesuits in a style typical of the Portuguese colonial period, with a Baroque-style façade with a monumental pediments and two large bell towers. The church was listed as a historic structure by National Institute of Historic and Artistic Heritage (IPHAN) in 1943. The historian José Anderson Nascimento calls it "an expressive landmark of colonial architecture in Sergipe del Rei."

== Location ==
The parish church is located on a high point in the municipality of Nossa Senhora do Socorro, 14 kilometres (8.7 mi) from the state capital of Sergipe, Aracaju. It is located on a small square, Praça João Garcês, at the junction of two prominent streets of the town, Rua Padre Manoel Gomes and Tv. Manoel da Silva Pontes. A small public square sits in front of the square, and a larger public square sits to the right (west) of the structure.

== History ==
The history of the church structure is unclear. It was likely built by the Jesuits on the site of an earlier structure. The Jesuits built a large-scale tunnel from the church site to nearby Laranjeiras as an escape route during the Dutch occupation of Sergipe in the 17th century. A similar tunnel is found at the Church of Our Lady of the Conception of Comandaroba. The entrance to the tunnel built by the Jesuits is now sealed.

The present structure dates to the early 18th century, but any documentation about its construction has been lost. Its grand scale is due to the wealth from slave-holding sugarcane plantations in the region, and its design suggests that it was constructed by the Jesuits at least in its early phase. An inscription with the date 1714 is found on the door of the sacristy; the building details of the church likewise dates to the same period. Any Jesuit involvement in the construction of the church would have ended by 1759 due to the expulsion of the Jesuits from Brazil.

An inventory of the Parish Church of Nossa Senhora do Socorro was made in 1943 at the time of its listing as a heritage structure by the National Institute of Historic and Artistic Heritage (IPHAN). A renovation was carried out in 1979, but the church reached an advanced state of deterioration by the early 21st century. A ruling of the federal government of Brazil partially closed the parish church in 2011 due to risk of collapse. A survey found water damage and extensive termite damage to the pulpits and other wood structures. Additionally, construction of buildings around the church in the 20th century led to increased humidity and fire risk to the church. The National Institute of Historic and Artistic Heritage (IPHAN) and Roman Catholic Archdiocese of Aracaju carried out reform works until 2018, when the church celebrated 300 years of the parish.

== Structure ==
The church is built on a regular, rectangular plan typical of the Portuguese colonial period. It has a central façade topped by a massive pediment flanked on both sides by bell tower. There are three portals at ground level, a larger one at center flanked by two slightly smaller. They are framed in stone and surmounted by pediments with volutes and a floral motif. The portals have three corresponding windows at the choir level, all with curved lintels, a feature likewise found in the including, they have raised lintels, like those of the Parish Church of Nossa Senhora Divina Pastora.

The pediment is large and separated from the façade by a cornice; José Anderson Nascimento compares its design to the Church of the Third Order of Mount Carmel and Church and Convent of Santa Cruz in São Cristóvão, both completed a few decades earlier. It has volutes, a single oculus, and a simple crucifix; but otherwise lacks the ornamentation of similar pediments in Brazil of the period. The bell towers have windows that correspond to those at the choir level. The belfries open to four sides and are surmounted by a bulbous caps, and flanked by spires.

== Interior ==
The interior has a central nave, chancel, sacristy, and tribunes. The high altar is elaborate, with a tabernacle at the base, Solomonic columns, lambrequin, and a baldachin. The openings to the tribunes are elaborate, with carved and gilded railings. The side chapel of Our Lady of Perpetual Help is richly decorated, with a large stone arch and carvings of volutes and floral motifs. There are additional side altars in the church, also richly decorated. They are dedicated to Saint Anthony, Our Lord of Good Death, Saint Anne, Our Lord of the Passion, and the Holy Sacrament.

The ceiling of the chancel retains its original painting. It has an image of Our Lady of Perpetual Help at center, flanked by figures representing the four continents known at the time: Europe, Africa, Asia, and the Americas. The church is noted for its image of Our Lady of Perpetual Help. It is a polychrome wooden sculpture of the 18th century of Jesuit craftsmanship. It replaced a smaller image of Our Lady of Perpetual Help; today there are two are at church.

The church has three recent tombs. The tomb of the Daltro Nabuco family dates to 1877. A second tomb is that of José Freire da Costa Pinto, a poet and jurist. The third is that of Friar Inocêncio Schleirmacher, a vicar of Socorro. The floor of the nave has a tombstone of Eliziário Vieira Muniz Telles, a Councilor of the Order of Christ and vicar of the parish of Socorro in the early 20th century.

== Protected status ==
The church was listed as a historic structure by the National Institute of Historic and Artistic Heritage in 1943.

== Access ==
The Parish Church of Nossa Senhora do Socorro is open to the public and be visited.
