= Parish Church of the Sacred Heart of Jesus =

Church in Laranjeiras, Brazil

- Igreja Matriz do Sagrado Coração de Jesus
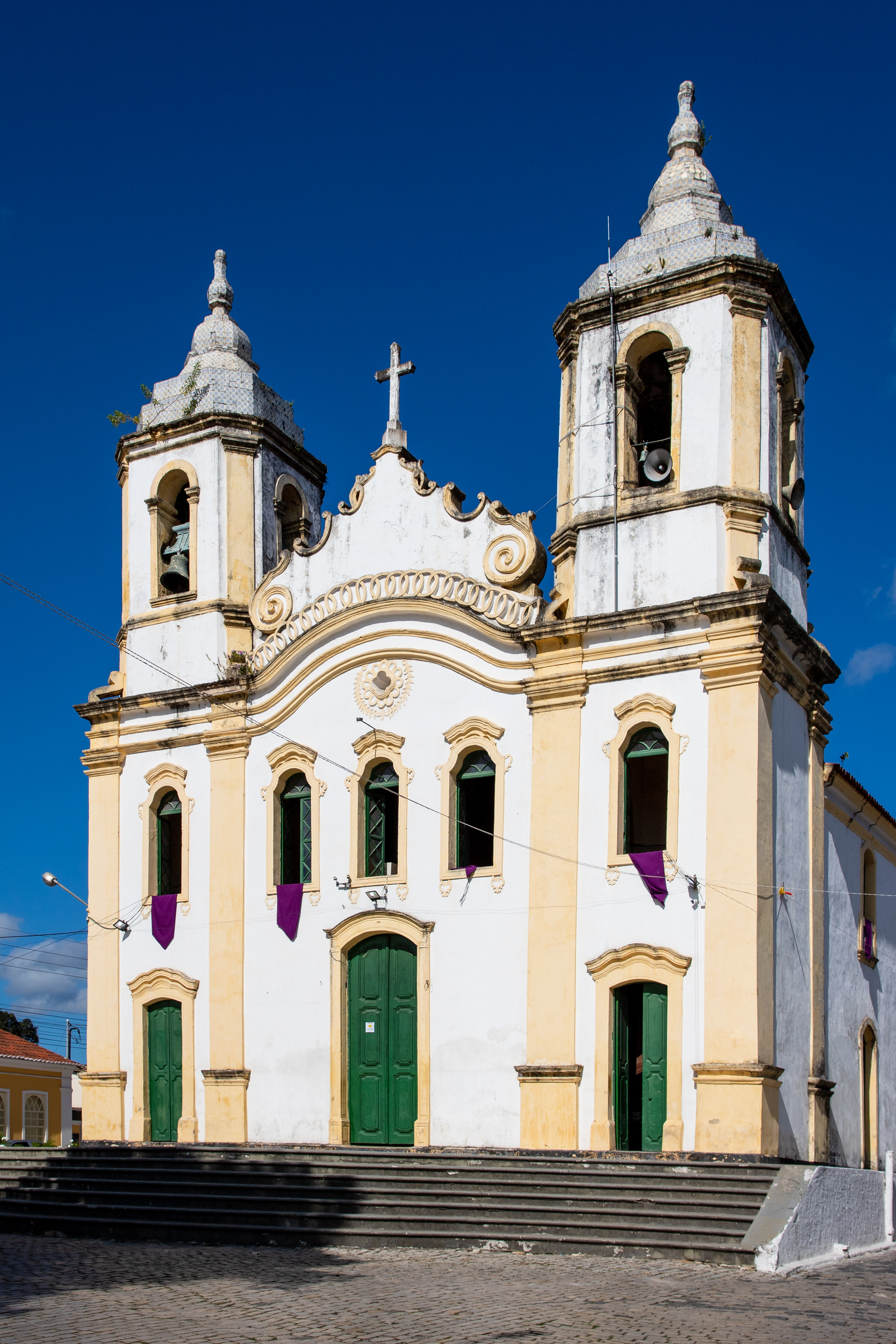
- Parish Church of the Sacred Heart of Jesus

- Location of the Parish Church of the Sacred Heart of Jesus in Brazil

Religion
- Affiliation: Catholic
- Rite: Roman

Location
- Municipality: Laranjeiras
- State: Sergipe
- Country: Brazil
- Interactive map of Parish Church of the Sacred Heart of Jesus
- Coordinates: 10.80509°S 37.16631°W

Architecture
- Style: Baroque
- Completed: 1790s

National Historic Heritage of Brazil
- Designated: 1941
- Reference no.: 294

The Parish Church of the Sacred Heart of Jesus (Portuguese: Igreja Matriz do Sagrado Coração de Jesus) is an 18-century Roman Catholic church in Laranjeiras, Sergipe, Brazil. It was the second church built in Laranjeiras, likely completed in the 1790s, following the Church of Our Lady of the Conception of Comandaroba, which was built by the Jesuits in the early 18th century and completed in 1734. The church was listed as a historic structure by National Institute of Historic and Artistic Heritage (IPHAN) in 1941. The church is dedicated to the Sacred Heart of Jesus and is constructed in the Baroque style. The Parish Church belongs to the Roman Catholic Archdiocese of Aracaju.

== History ==
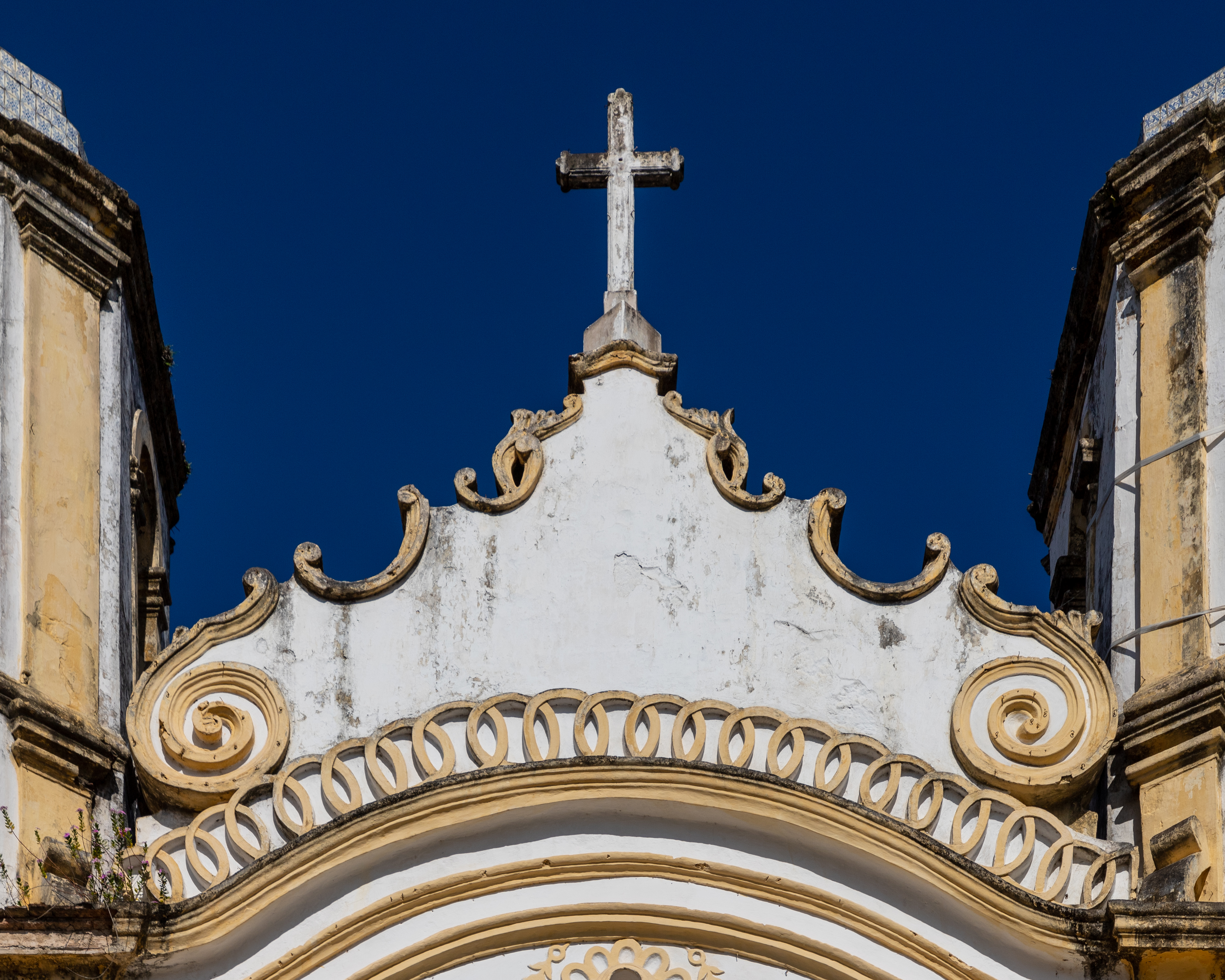
Baroque-style pediment

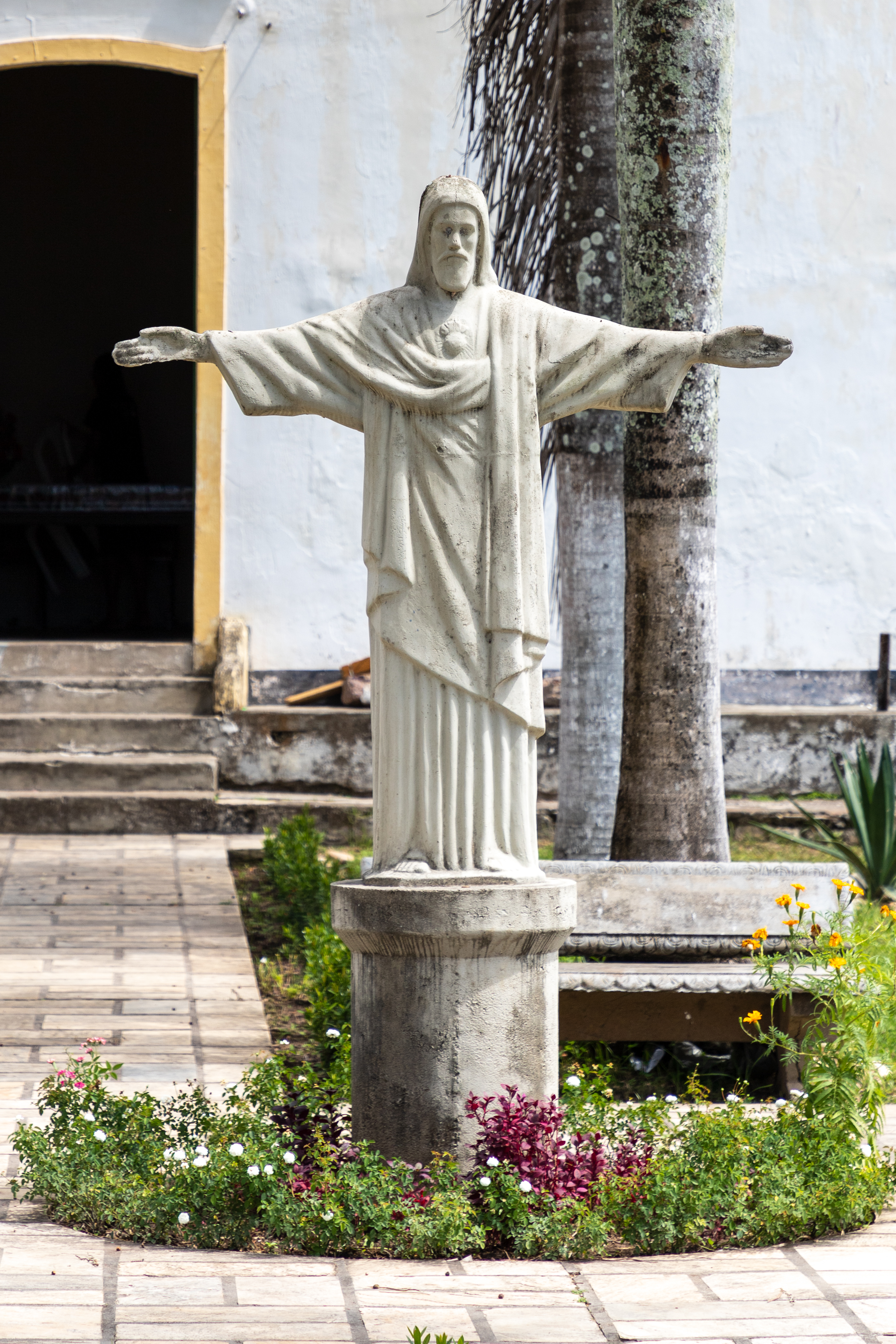
Rear churchyard

Construction of Parish Church of the Sacred Heart of Jesus began at the end of the 18th century. Residents of Laranjeiras, then a district of Nossa Senhora do Socorro with a small port on the river, petitioned Queen Maria for the construction of a church in 1790. The petition, held in the Public Archive of Laranjeiras, is one of the few early records of the church. It reads, "[T]he inhabitants of the village of Laranjeiras in the parish of Continguiba, Sergipe d'el Rei, in 1790, requested permission from Queen Dona Maria to build a chapel dedicated to the Sacred Heart of Jesus."^{A} With the completion of the church, Laranjeiras had two churches: the Parish Church and the Church of Our Lady of the Conception of Comandaroba, which belonged to the Comandaroba Plantation. The church was unable to accommodate the population of Laranjeiras, which grew rapidly in the 18th century, and the building was enlarged in 1905.

== Location ==
The Parish Church of the Sacred Heart of Jesus is located on a high point above a bend in the Cotinguiba River. The church faces the river but, unusually, does not open to Praça da Matriz. The south façade of the church, which faces the public square, has numerous small portals and windows.

== Structure ==
The Parish Church of the Sacred Heart of Jesus was built of mixed masonry of stone and brick. It is 40 metres (130 ft) long and 14 metres (46 ft) wide. The church follows the typical Portuguese colonial design, with a façade flanked by two bell towers with a monumental pediment at center. The façade is divided horizontally into three levels. A church portal is at the lowest level, with a curved lintel doorway with a cornice, jambs.

The upper section at the choir level has three doubled-arched windows with transoms and leaf motif carvings. They are surmounted by a quatrefoil oculus above the middle window. The pediment, at the highest level, has volutes and is topped by a cross. The bell towers have windows similar to those at the choir level. The windows of the bell gable are arched; the gables have domes decorated with tiles and topped by similarly tiled pinnacles.

=== Interior ===
The interior has a rectangular plan with a single nave, chancel, and two sacristies. The altar is simple with gilded woodcarving and Composite order columns with fluted shafts. The altarpiece has a painting of the Holy Family. The painting of the ceiling of the chancel is of the Sacred Heart of Jesus, and is attributed to José Teófilo de Jesus.

==== Side Chapel of the Blessed Sacrament ====
A side chapel dedicated to the Blessed Sacrament is located left of the altar, and is "of great importance". The side chapel has a carved wooden gate, a glass door surmounted by ornaments, and a semicircular arched doorway. It additionally has glazed lateral oculi. The ceiling of the side chapel has a painting of the Last Supper, and is attributed to Antônio Dias.

== Notable artwork ==
- O Sagrado Coração, painting of the chancel ceiling, José Teófilo de Jesus
- O Cenáculo da Última Ceia, painting in Chapel of the Blessed Sacrament, attributed to Antônio Dias

== Protected status ==
The Parish Church of the Sacred Heart of Jesus was listed as a historic structure by the National Institute of Historic and Artistic Heritage in 1941. It was listed in the Book of Historical Works as no. 294, and is a federally protected site in Laranjeiras.

== Footnote ==
A. In Portuguese: "Os moradores da povoação das Laranjeiras da freguesia de Continguiba de Sergipe d'el Rei, em 1790, pediram licença à rainha Dona Maria de poderem construir uma capela com o título do Coração de Jesus".
