= Grotto of Pedra Furada =

Cave in Sergipe, Brazil

Coordinates: 10°49′15″S 37°10′40″W

- Interactive map of Grotto of Pedra Furada
- Location: Laranjeiras (Sergipe, Brazil)
- Length: 2 kilometres (1.2 mi)
- Geology: limestone cave
- Entrances: 1

The Grotto of Pedra Furada (Portuguese: Gruta da Pedra Furada), also known as the Refuge of Pedra Furada (Portuguese: Abrigo da Pedra Furada), is a limestone cave in the Machado district of Laranjeiras, Sergipe, Brazil.

The cave's entrance is located approximately 5 kilometres (3.1 mi) from the city center of Laranjeiras and is one of 16 caves in the municipality. The cave has been damaged over time by limestone mining. Limestone removal from the site has ended, but the partial destruction is notable. It remains a site of Catholic and Afro-Brazilian religious celebrations.

The grotto was the site of early Jesuit (Society of Jesus) activities in the region. The Society held mass in the grotto during the Dutch invasion of Brazil. According to local legend, the Jesuits used a tunnel from the Grotto of Pedra Furada to access Church of Our Lady of the Conception of Comandaroba to continue to celebrate mass. The church is approximately 2 kilometres (1.2 mi) from the cave entrance; if confirmed, the tunnel would be the largest in the state of Sergipe.

== Protected status ==
The Grotto of Pedra Furada was listed as a protected structure by the state of Sergipe in 1990.

== Access ==
The Grotto of Pedra Furada is located on private land but may be accessed.
