= Church of Our Lady of the Conception of Comandaroba =

Roman Catholic church in Sergipe, Brazil

- Igreja de Nossa Senhora da Conceição de Comandaroba
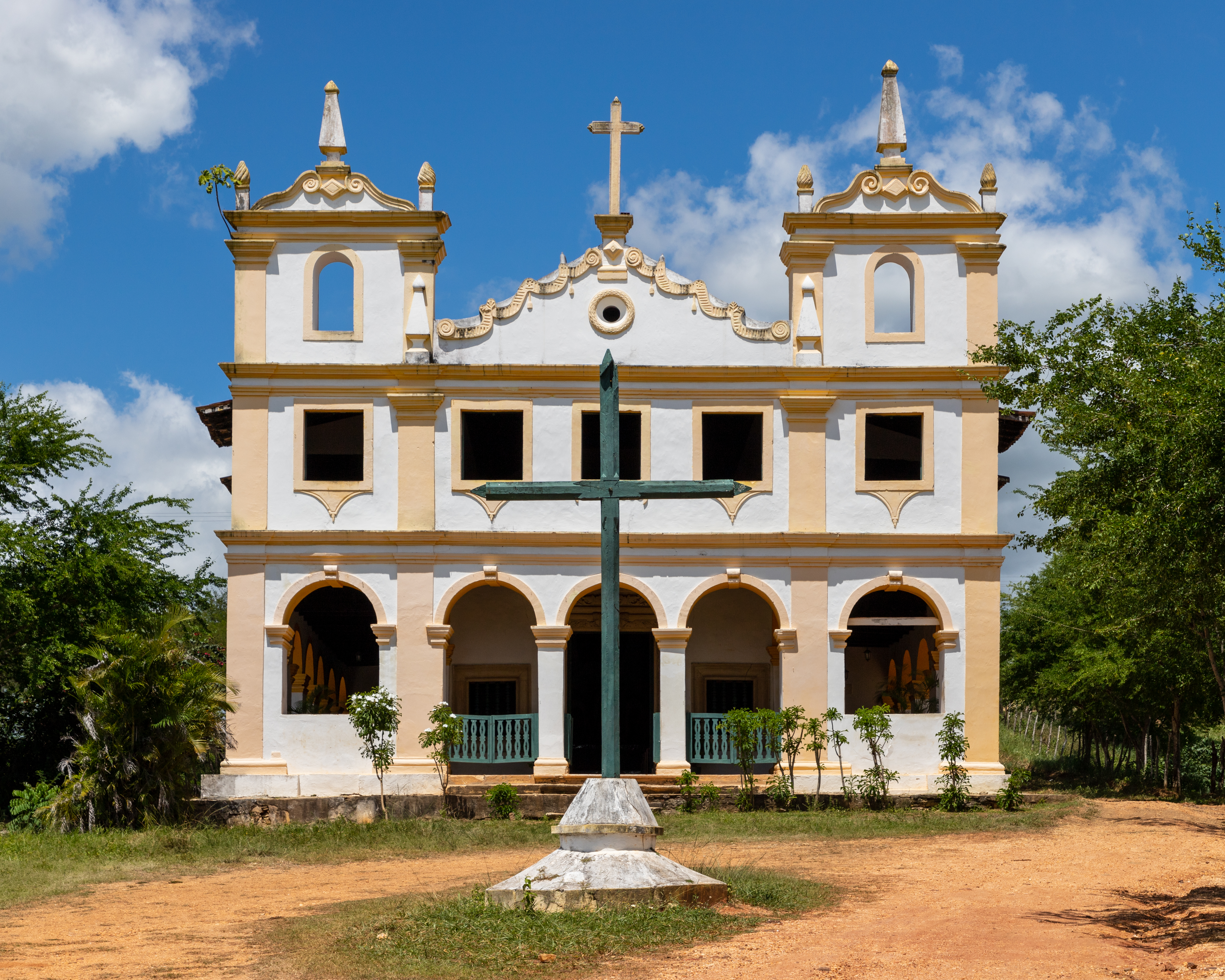
- Church of Our Lady of the Conception of Comandaroba

- Location of the Church of Our Lady of the Conception of Comandaroba in Brazil

Religion
- Affiliation: Catholic
- Rite: Roman
- Ownership: Roman Catholic Archdiocese of Aracaju
- Patron: Our Lady of the Conception

Location
- Municipality: Laranjeiras
- State: Sergipe
- Country: Brazil
- Coordinates: 10.808217°S 37.182463°W

Architecture
- Style: Baroque
- Founder: Society of Jesus
- Completed: 1734

National Historic Heritage of Brazil
- Designated: 1941
- Reference no.: 299

The Church of Our Lady of the Conception of Comandaroba (Portuguese: Igreja de Nossa Senhora da Conceição de Comandaroba, or simply the Igreja de Comandaroba) is an 18th-century Roman Catholic church in Laranjeiras, Sergipe, Brazil. It was established by the Jesuits and was passed to the Carmelite order after its construction. It is dedicated to Our Lady of the Conception and is owned by the Roman Catholic Archdiocese of Aracaju. The church was listed as a historic structure by National Institute of Historic and Artistic Heritage (IPHAN) in 1941.

== History ==
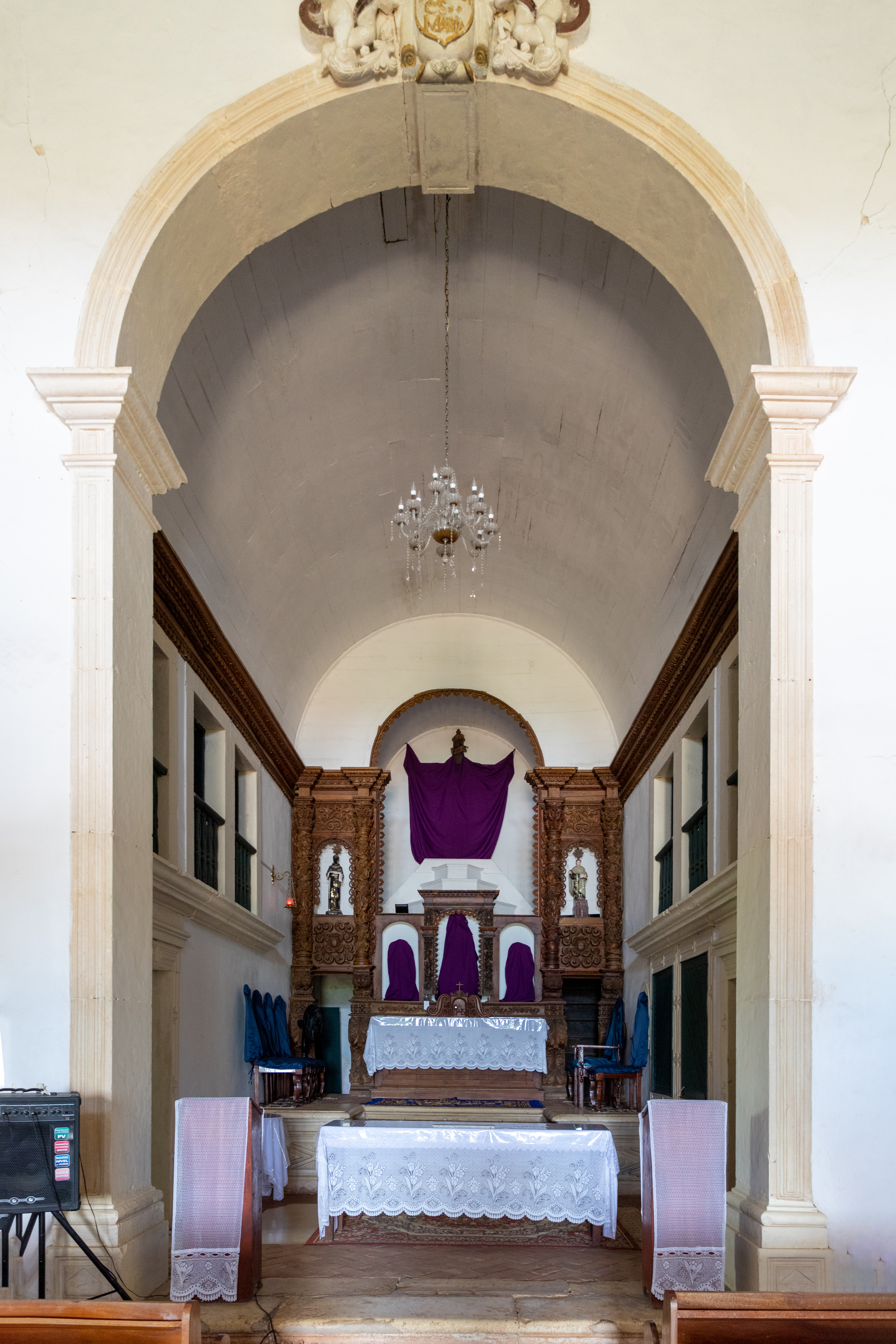
View of chancel, Church of Our Lady of the Conception of Comandaroba

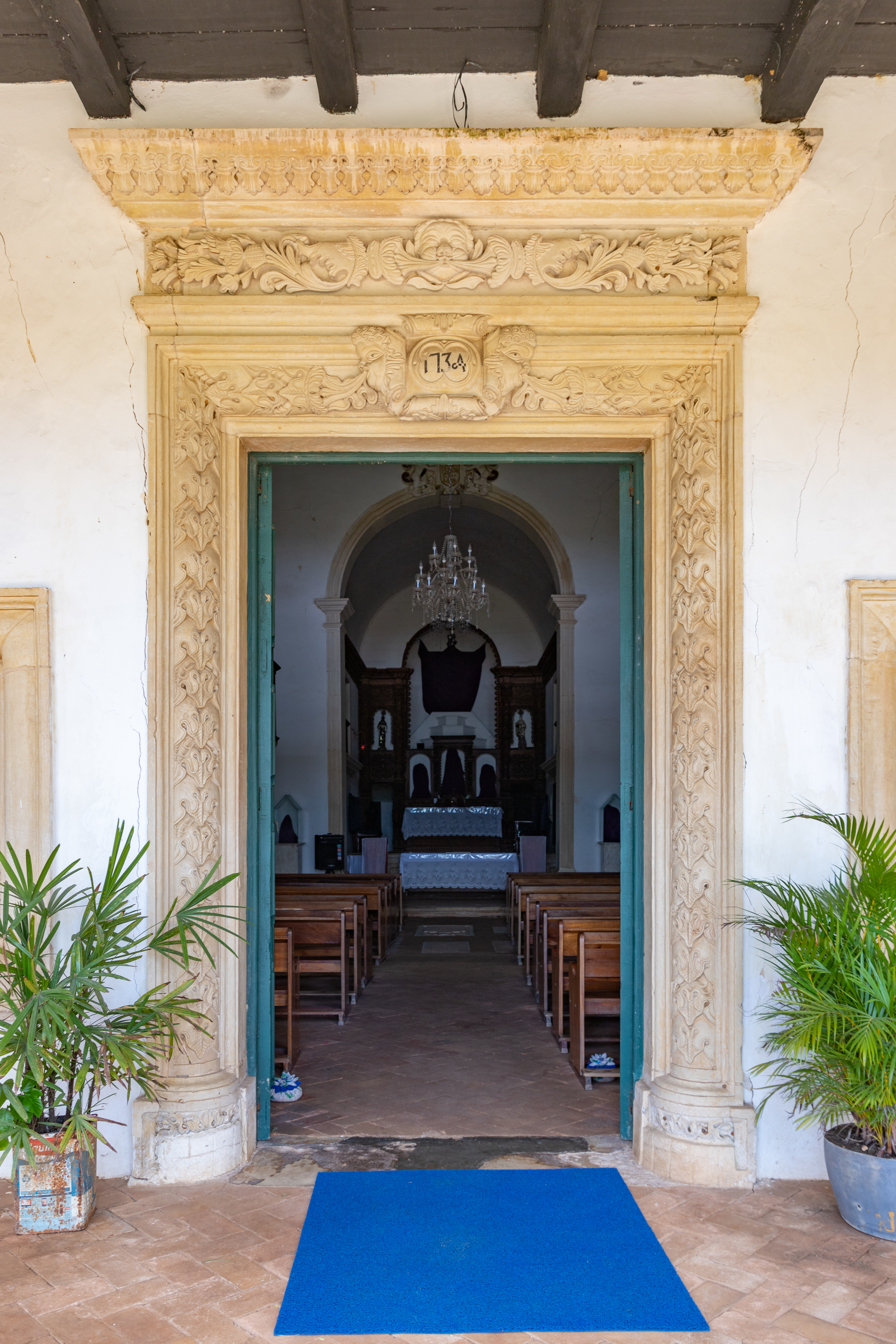
Church portal, with fine stone carving and date of completion of church at top

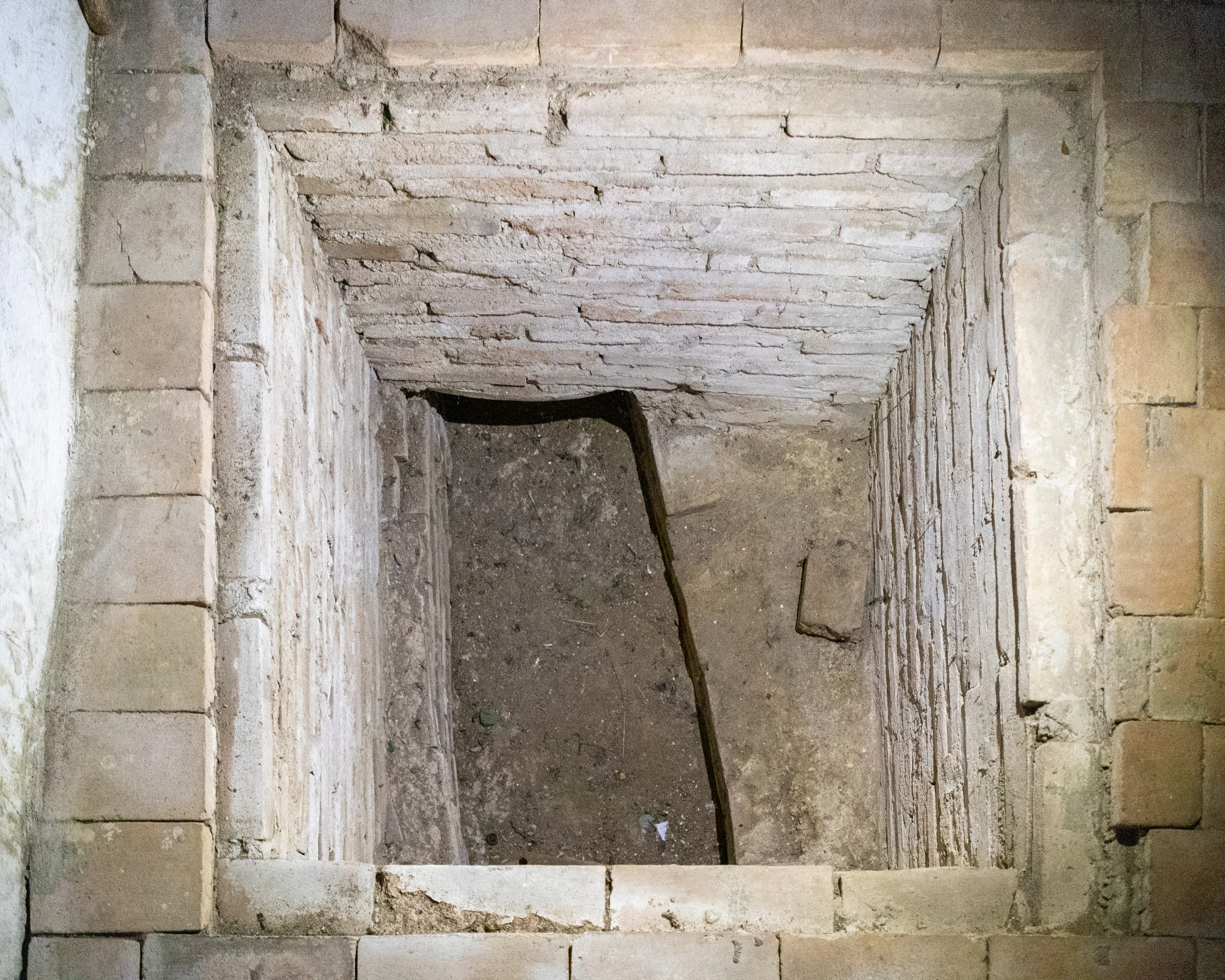
Tunnel to the rural residence of the Jesuits, now sealed, used by the Order during the Dutch occupation of Sergipe

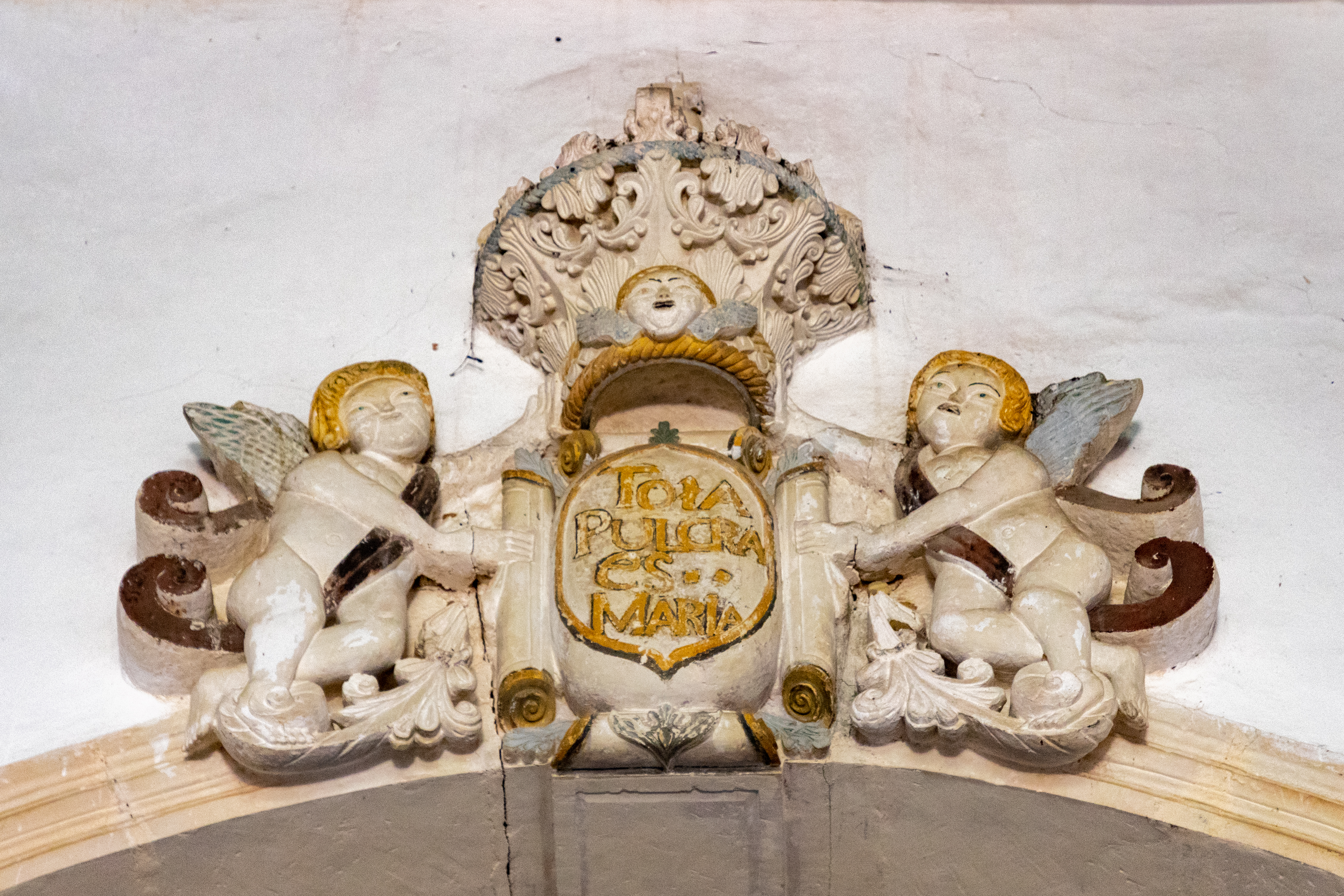
Cartouche at top of chancel arch, with two angels holding a crowned cartouche with an inscription that reads: Tota pulcha, es Maria ("You are completely beautiful, Mary")

The Church of Our Lady of the Conception of Comandaroba was one of two Jesuit properties in present-day Laranjeiras. Laranjeiras was home to indigenous people prior to the arrival of the Portuguese. The church was built on the site where indigenous people cultivated beans, hence the name "comandaroba", from Tupi-Guarani, "comanda", meaning bean, and "róba", meaning bitter, or green. The first Portuguese settlers arrived in the 16th century, and the 17th century was marked by the Dutch attacks and invasion of the region. The Jesuits initially built a retreat on the Cotinguiba River, the Casa do Retiro, in the late 17th century. The Jesuits built a large-scale tunnel between the Comandaroba Church and their retreat during the Dutch occupation of Sergipe; a similar tunnel is found at the Parish Church of Nossa Senhora do Socorro in nearby Nossa Senhora do Socorro.

The Jesuits then purchased a house at Comandaroba, 1 kilometre (0.62 mi) from the residence on a slope, and completed a church on the site in 1734; it was part of the larger Comandaroba Plantation. The Jesuits left Laranjeiras prior to the expulsion of the Jesuits from Brazil in 1759. Colonel Felipe Pereira do Lago and his wife donated the Comandaroba Plantation to the Carmelite Order of Bahia in 1756. A parish church was established in Laranjeiras at the end of the 18th century, the Parish Church of the Sacred Heart of Jesus. The Church of Comandaroba belonged to the Carmelites until the early 19th century.

== Structure ==
The Church of Our Lady of the Conception of Comandaroba was designed with "all the characteristics of the Society of Jesus". It is a structure consisting of mixed masonry of stone and brick, with a central façade flanked by bell gables with round arched openings. A veranda surrounds the front of the church and sides of the nave. It opens to the exterior via arcades. The façade has three arcades that give access to the veranda. The other arcades are blocked and form parapets, two flanking the central arcades, and numerous on either side of the church. The portico is of limestone with the monogram "A.M.D.G. 1734", the Latin motto of the Society of Jesus and year of completion of the structure.^{A} The entrance of the tunnel built by the Jesuits is located behind the chancel, and is now sealed.

=== Interior ===
The church has a rectangular plan with a small nave, chancel, and two sacristies. The nave is 10 metres (33 ft) long and 6.5 metres (21 ft) wide; the chancel is a further 6 metres (20 ft) deep. The church floor has numerous gravestones. The sacristies and chancel are connected by entrance doors and rectangular windows with lattice screens. The chancel arch is 3.5 metres (11 ft) high, 6 metres (20 ft) wide, of stone, and is surmounted an ornament of two angels, holding a crowned cartouche and an inscription that reads: Tota pulcha, es Maria, or "You are completely beautiful, Mary", a reference to the Immaculate Conception.

The chancel and altar have fine images of the Crucified Christ, Our Lady of the Rosary, Our Lady of Mount Carmel, Saint Benedict, Saint Efigênia, and Saint Gonçalo Garcia. The altar has two lateral niches, and three in the central space. The altar has a stylized tabernacle with "IHS" in relief, monograph of the Jesuits. The pulpit of the nave has a lion, sculpted in stone, at the base of the pulpit; it was damaged by fortune hunters.

== Protected status ==
The Church of Our Lady of the Conception of Comandaroba was listed as a historic structure by the National Institute of Historic and Artistic Heritage in 1941. It was listed in the Book of Historical Works no. 299. The Parish Church of the Sacred Heart of Jesus, also in Laranjeiras, Sergipe, was also listed as a historic structure by IPHAN in the same year.

== Footnotes ==
A."A.M.D.G.", Ad maiorem Dei gloriam, in English, "For the greater glory of God."
