= Chapel of the Jesus Maria José Sugar Plantation =

Abandoned church in Sergipe, Brazil

- Capela do Engenho Jesus, Maria, José
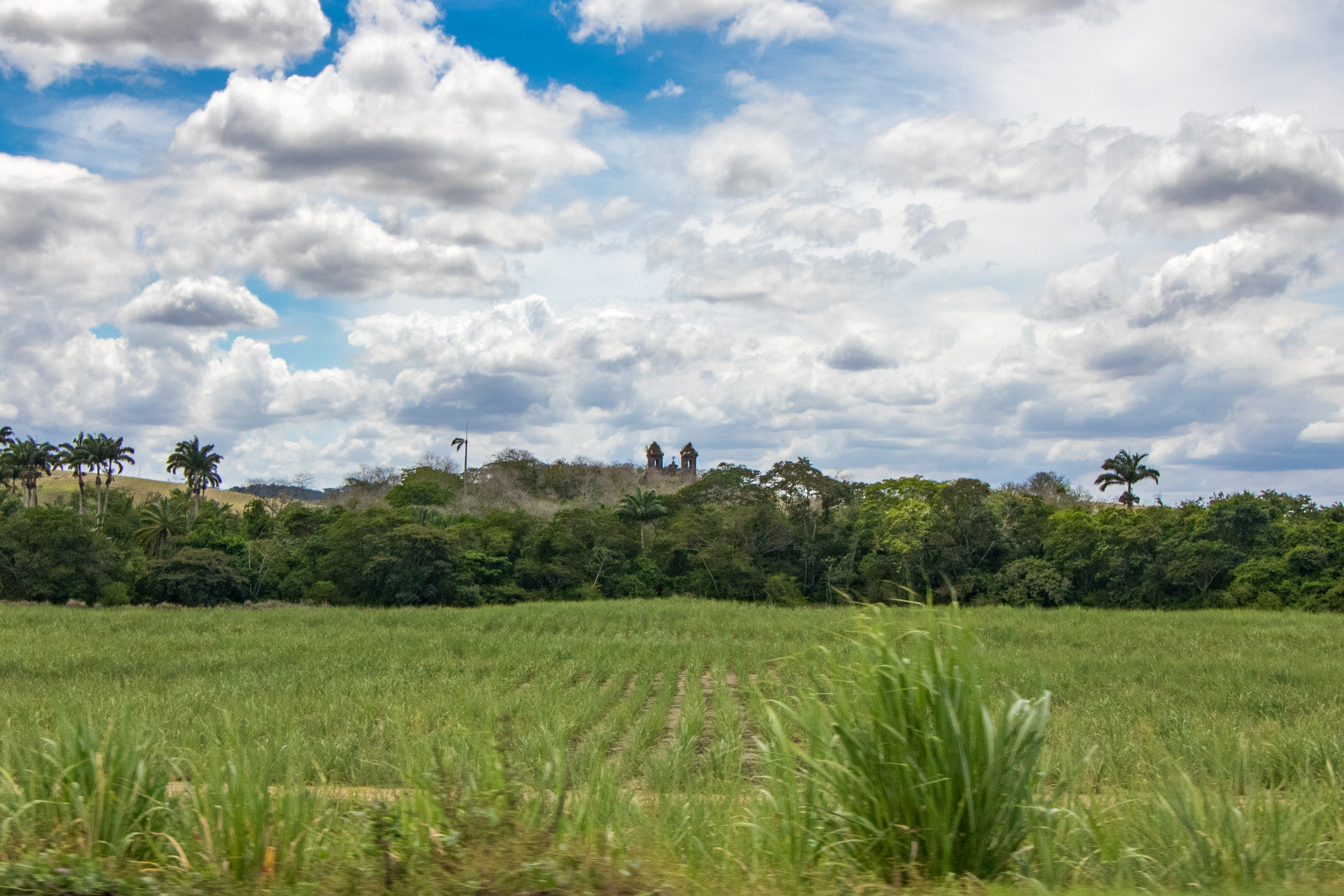

- Location of the Chapel of the Jesus Maria José Sugar Plantation in Brazil

Religion
- Affiliation: Catholic
- Rite: Roman

Location
- Municipality: Laranjeiras
- State: Sergipe
- Country: Brazil
- Interactive map of Chapel of the Jesus Maria José Sugar Plantation
- Coordinates: 10.84851°S 37.20992°W

Architecture
- Type: Baroque
- Direction of façade: East

The Chapel of the Jesus Maria José Sugar Plantation (Portuguese: Capela do Engenho Jesus, Maria, José) is an abandoned 18th-century Roman Catholic church in Laranjeiras, Sergipe, Brazil. The chapel was built in 1769 on the Jesus Maria José Sugar Plantation, 19 kilometres (12 mi) west of the city center Laranjeiras. The church was listed as a historic structure by National Institute of Historic and Artistic Heritage (IPHAN) in 1943. Despite its heritage designation, the church was abandoned and is an advanced state of ruin.

== History ==
The Jesus Maria José Sugar Plantation once had a manor house, an accompanying chapel, and buildings associated with sugarcane cultivation and processing. Only the chapel, built in 1769, remains. The painting of the chapel ceiling, attributed to José Teófilo de Jesus, was completed in the 1840s.

== Structure ==
The chapel consists of a large nave, chancel, and side altars. Its elaborate baroque-style pediment with volutes remains. The church has a single central portals at the ground level and three windows at the choir level. The facade is flanked by two large bell towers corresponding to the two interior side corridors. Each tower has a small door corresponding to the central doors of the church at the lower level and a window above corresponding to those of the choir level. They are each additionally topped by a dome surmounted by a pinnacle.

The interior of the chapel featured an imposing nave with side corridors and two sacristies. A room above the left sacristy was reserved for the family of the plantation owner, with a trellis window separating the room and the chancel. It had rich carvings and a perspective ceiling painting attributed to José Teófilo de Jesus. The painting depicted the Holy Family, and was probably completed in the 1840s.

== Protected status ==
The Chapel of the Jesus Maria José Sugar Plantation was listed as a historic structure by the National Institute of Historic and Artistic Heritage in 1943.

== Access ==
The Chapel of the Jesus Maria José Sugar Plantation is located on private property and may not be visited.
