= Cândido de Faria =

Brazilian caricaturist and poster designer

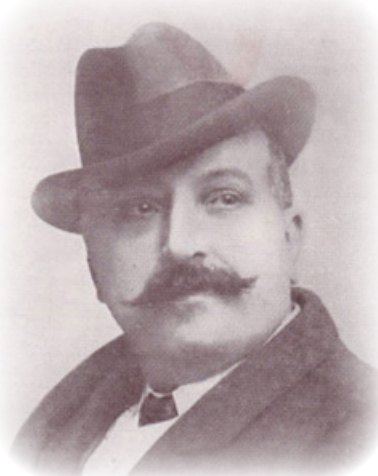
- Candido Aragonez de Faria (c. 1900)
- Born: 12 August 1849; Laranjeiras, Sergipe, Brazil
- Died: 17 December 1911 (aged 62); Paris, France
- Other name: Faria
- Occupations: Caricaturist, painter, lithographer and poster designer

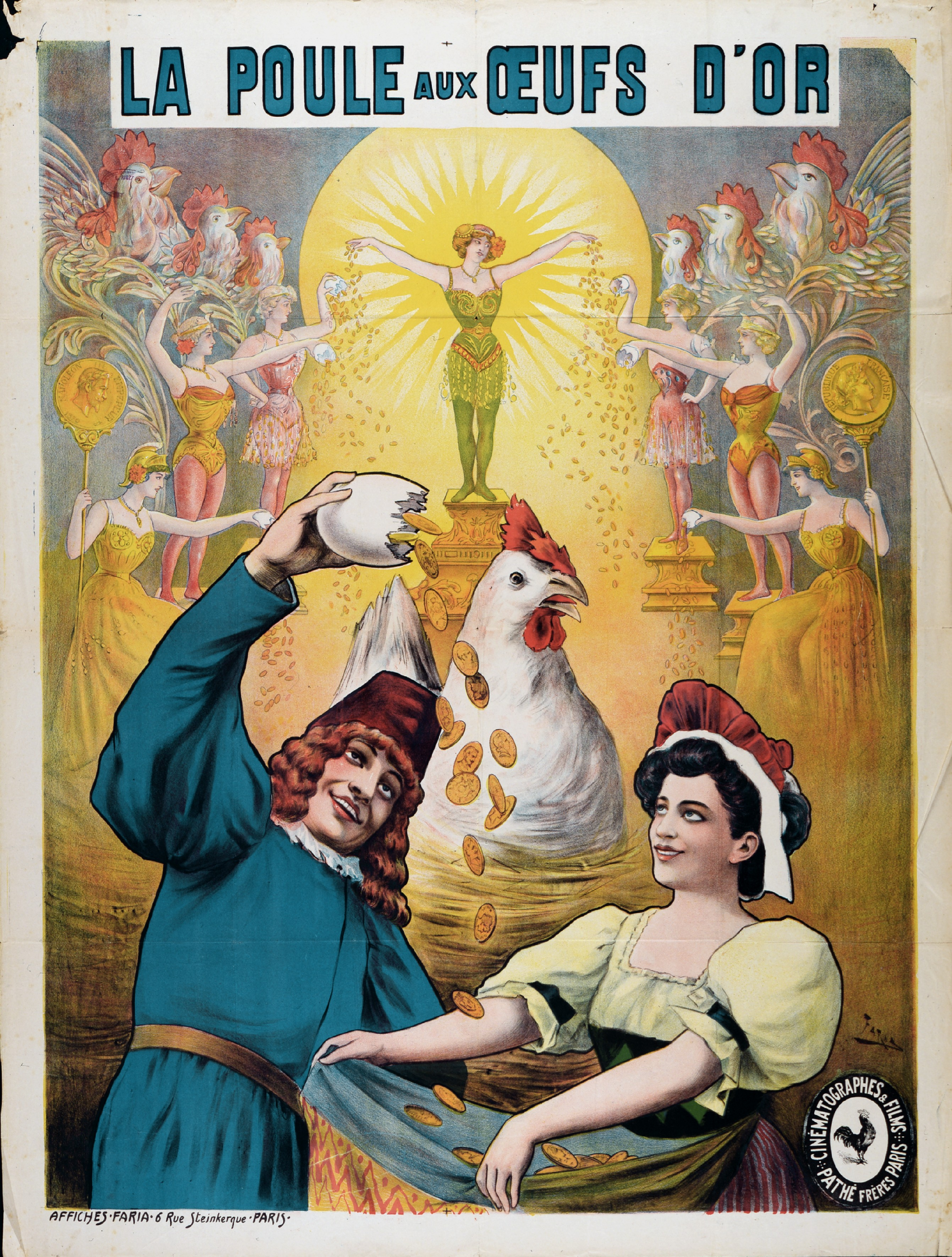
Poster by Faria for La poule aux oeufs d'or (1905), a French silent film directed by Gabriel Moreau (?) and Gaston Velle for Pathé Frères (printed by Affiches Faria). Collection EYE Film Institute Netherlands.

Cândido Aragonez de Faria (artist's name Faria, 12 August 1849 in Laranjeiras, Sergipe (Brasil) – 17 December 1911 in Paris) was a Brazilian caricaturist, painter, lithographer and poster designer who emigrated to France in 1882. Faria designed posters for performers in café-chantants and the cinema but also for music scores (lithographies in small and large formats). The collective art work of his workshop, which continued after his death, was signed Atelier Faria or Affiches Faria.

== Life and career ==
=== Brazil ===
Faria was born in 1849, the eldest of four children of physician José Cândido Faria (-1855) and Josefa Aragonez, who was of Spanish extraction. Dr. Faria had studied in Montpelier and specialised in cholera. He founded the Hospital de Caridade de Laranjeiras and died in a cholera epidemic in 1855. The family moved to Rio de Janeiro, where their relatives lived. There young Cândido studied at the Liceu de Artes e Ofícios (School of Arts and Crafts) and at the Escola de Belas Artes (Fine-Arts School).

Faria's very productive career started with his artwork for many magazines satirizing local politicians and the clergy in Rio de Janeiro, like Paul Gavarni and Honoré Daumier did in France. He began as a main caricaturist in 1866 for the satirical periodical A Pacotilha (English: Fake, later Pandokeu (Joker)). In September 1869 he started with his brother Adolfo the weekly O Mosquito (The Mosquito). In April 1871 he bought O Lobisomen (The Werewolf) from the lithographer António Alves do Vale. Faria and Vale signed some works together. Then in June 1874 Faria started a new weekly 0 Mefistófeles as the sole illustrator, to be merged with O Mosquito in 1875. From 1869 through 1874 Faria was one of the illustrators of the magazine A Vida Fluminense (Life in Rio de Janeiro), since 1874 O Fígaro, for which he became the sole illustrator. Since October 1876, Faria supplied cartoons to the weeklies O Ganganelli and O Mequetrefe (The Coxcomb). In 1877 he founded the magazine O Diabrete (The Goblin). Faria worked also for more ephemeral magazines, such as A Comédia Popular (The people's comedy), A Galeria (The Gallery), Ziguezague and Ba-Ta-Clan (The Hotchpotch).

=== Argentina ===
During 1879 - 1882, Faria illustrated in Buenos Aires the main satiric weekly El Mosquito and the new magazine Cotorra (English: parrot, windbag), introducing chromolithography in South America. Later he obtained the right to exclusively illustrate the artistic and literary weekly El Correo del Domingo (Sunday Post) and the daily El Gráfico (~ The graph).

=== France ===
In 1882 Faria emigrated to France and established his workshop at Paris, working with Charles Clérice of the Clérice Frères illustrators. Faria gained fame by his illustrations for books (e.g., Le fils de Porthos by Paul Mahalin, L'enfant d'Une vierge by Alfred Sirven, and Pour rire à deux by Olympe Audouard) and magazines (La Caricature by Albert Robida, Le Papillon, Le Monde illustré and La Musique pour tous). But Faria also illustrated many editions of sheet music for the singer Paulus (Jean-Paul Habans) and created the portrait of the singer Montéhus used for numerous covers. He also illustrated sheet music for songs, romances and operettas by Justin Clérice, Louis Ganne, Charles Lecocq, Olivier Métra, Edmond Missa, Robert Planquette, Vincent Scotto and others.

Since 1895, Faria and the lithographers Sebaïn and Axelrod created posters for shows, tourism and general advertising. From 1902 up to his death in 1911 he was, with about 300 posters, the main poster designer for the film company Pathé (Les Victimes de l'alcoolisme by Ferdinand Zecca, L'assommoir based on Emile Zola, and so on).

In France Faria married and had a son Jacques, artist and father of Philippe Aragonez de Faria, who would curate his father's and grandfather's work.

== Gallery ==
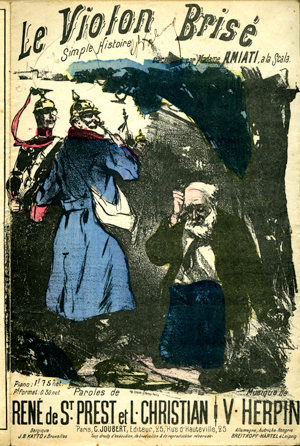
Illustration for the music score of the song Le Violon brisé, 1885.

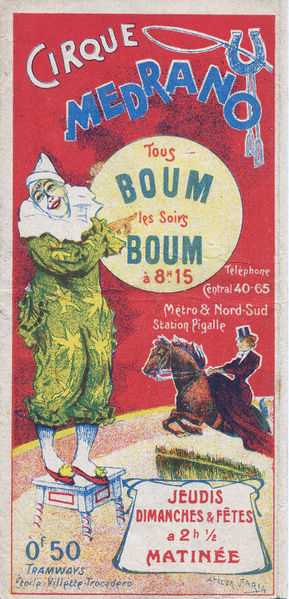
Poster for the Cirque Medrano, Paris, c. 1900

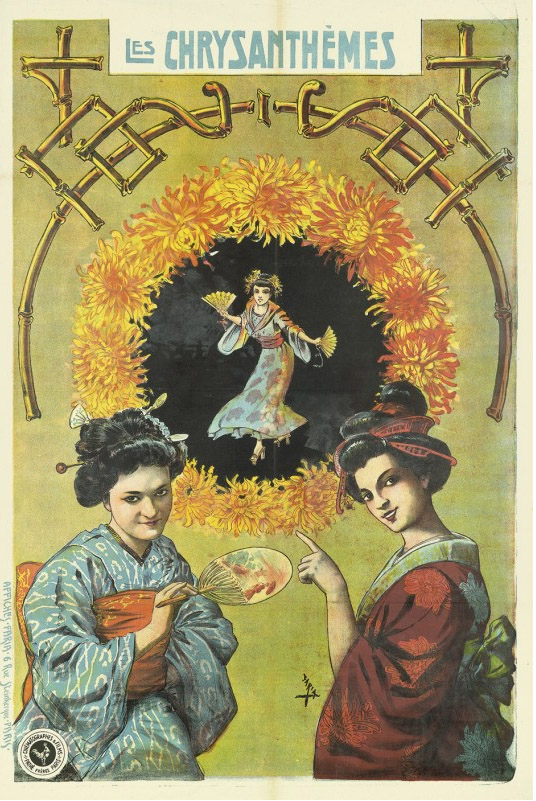
Poster for Les chrysanthèmes, a 1907 Pathé Frères film

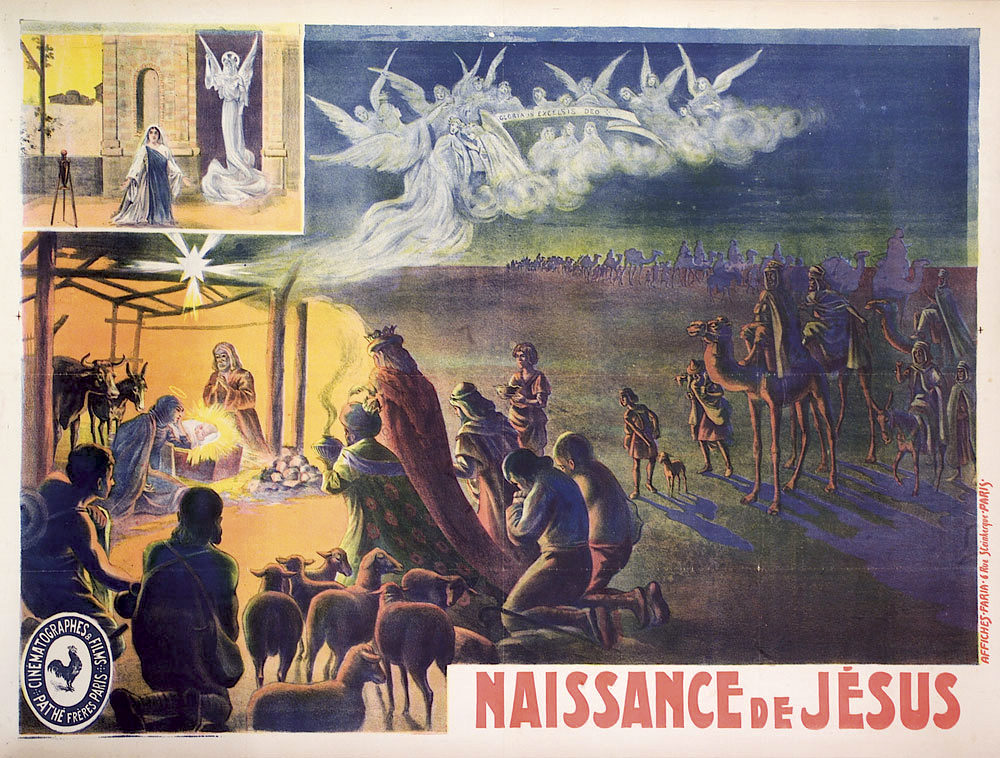
Poster for Vie et passion de notre seigneur Jésus-Christ, a silent film directed by Ferdinand Zecca and Segundo de Chomón, 1907

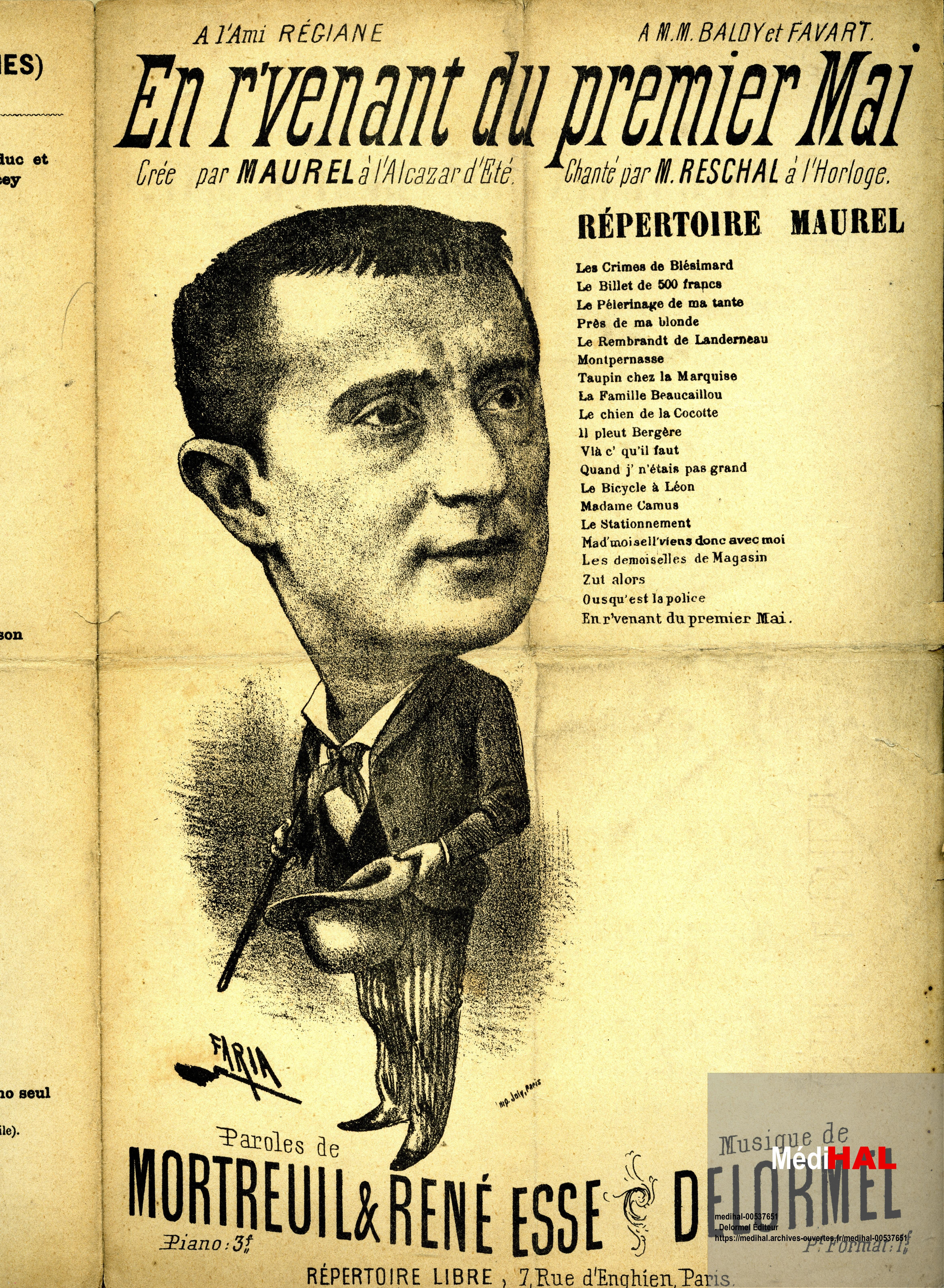
Sheet for the song En r'venant du premier mai.

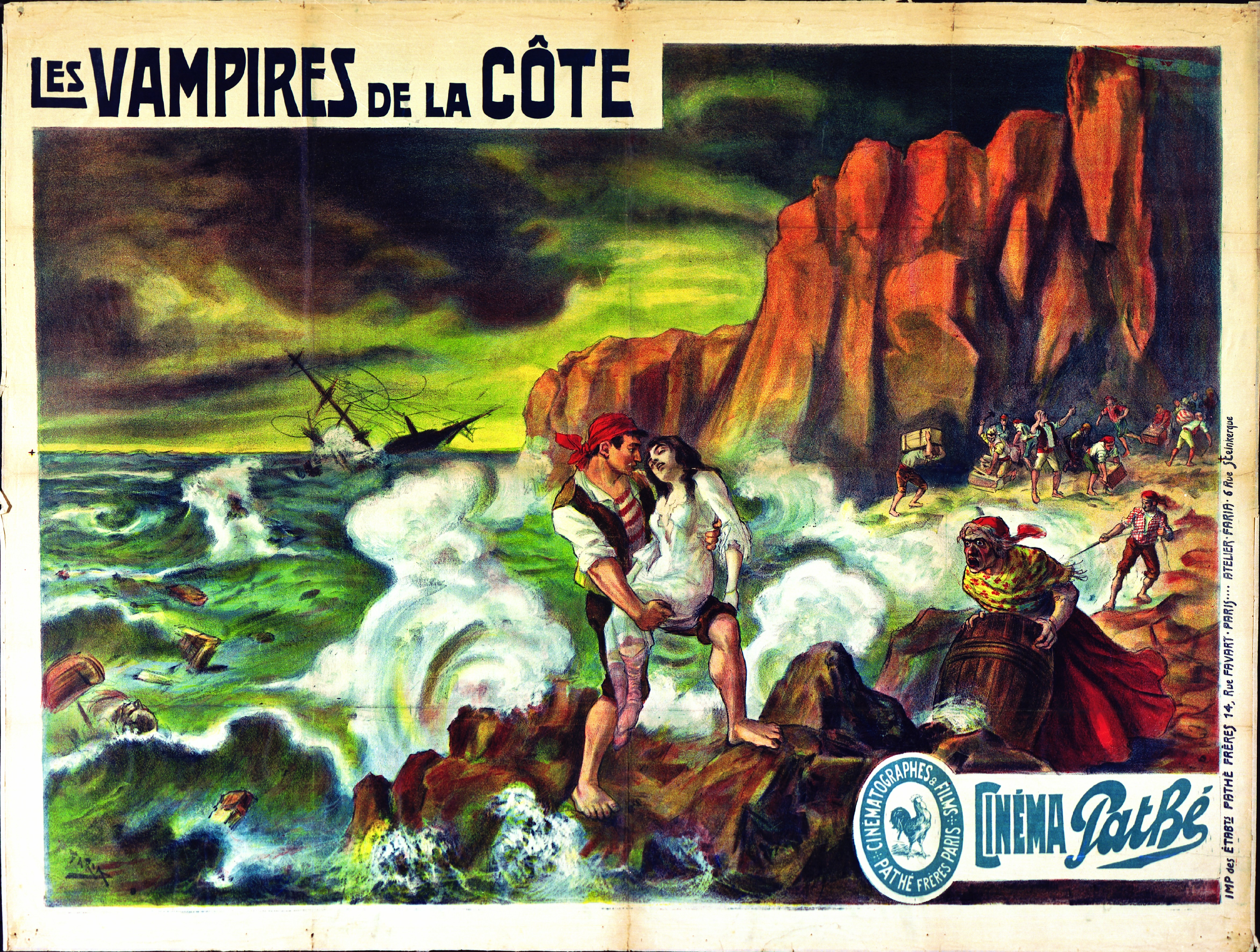
Film poster for Les Vampires de la côte, 1908. Collection EYE Film Institute Netherlands.

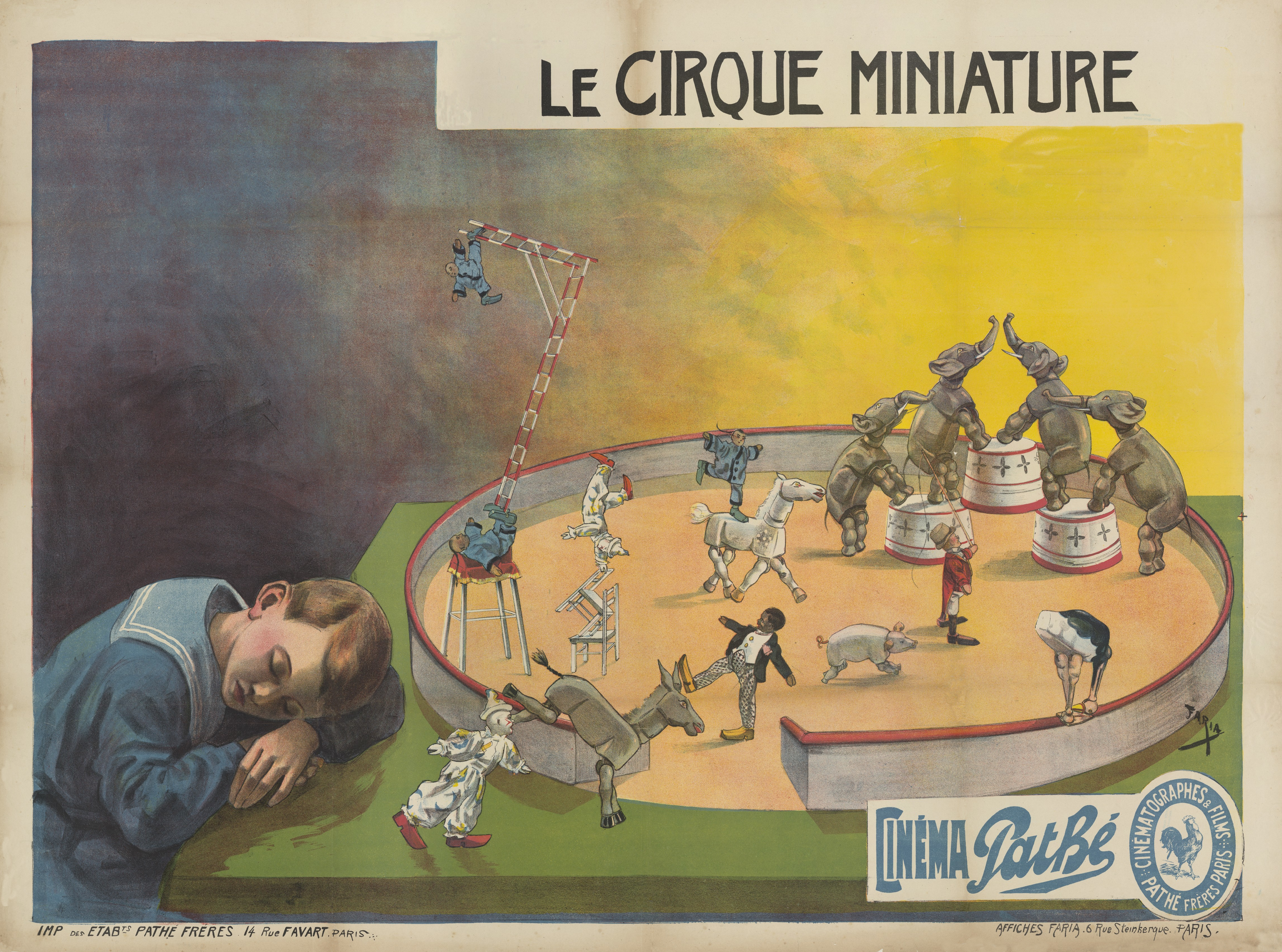
Film poster for Le Cirque Miniature, 1908. Collection EYE Film Institute Netherlands.

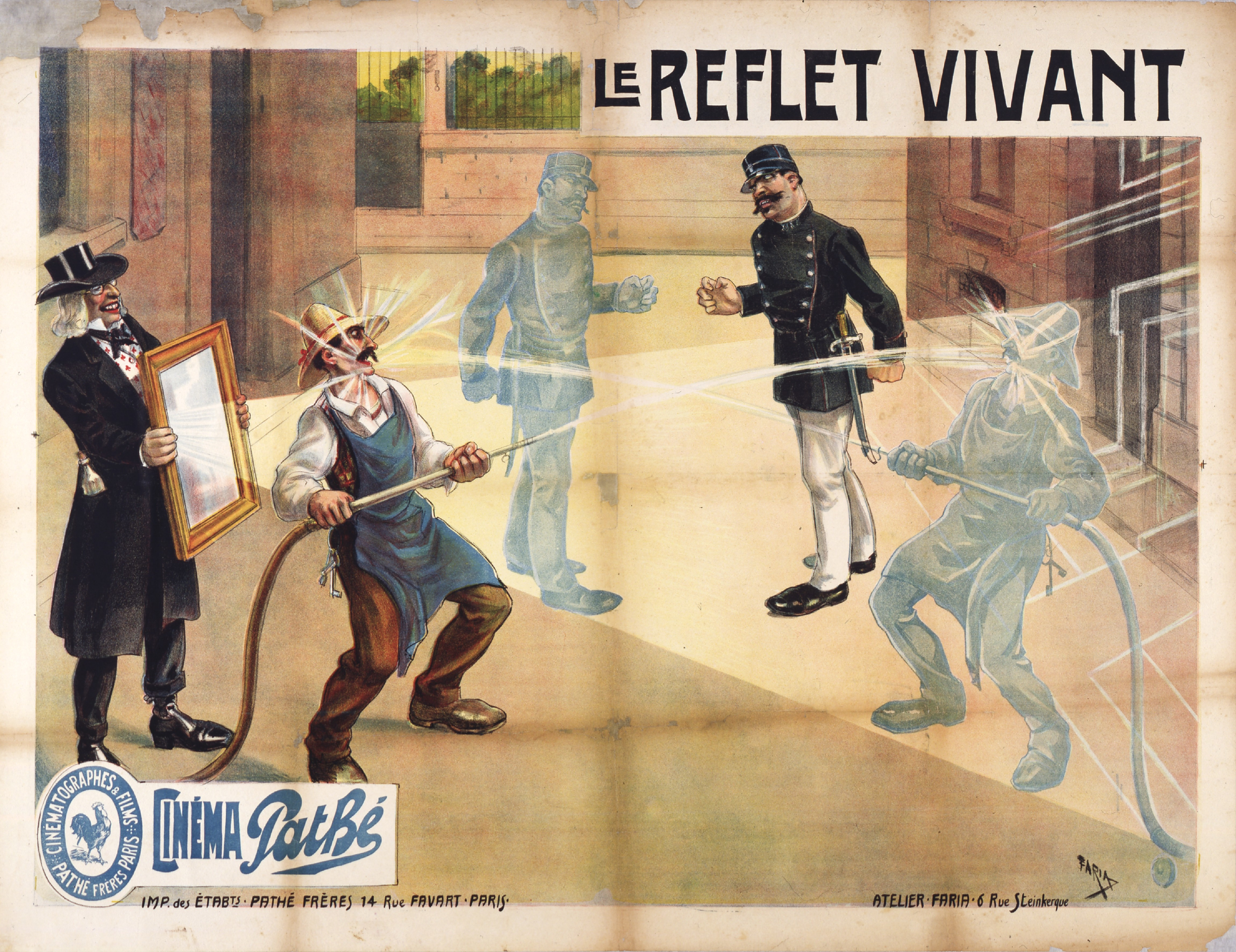
Film poster for Le reflet vivant, 1908. Collection EYE Film Institute Netherlands.

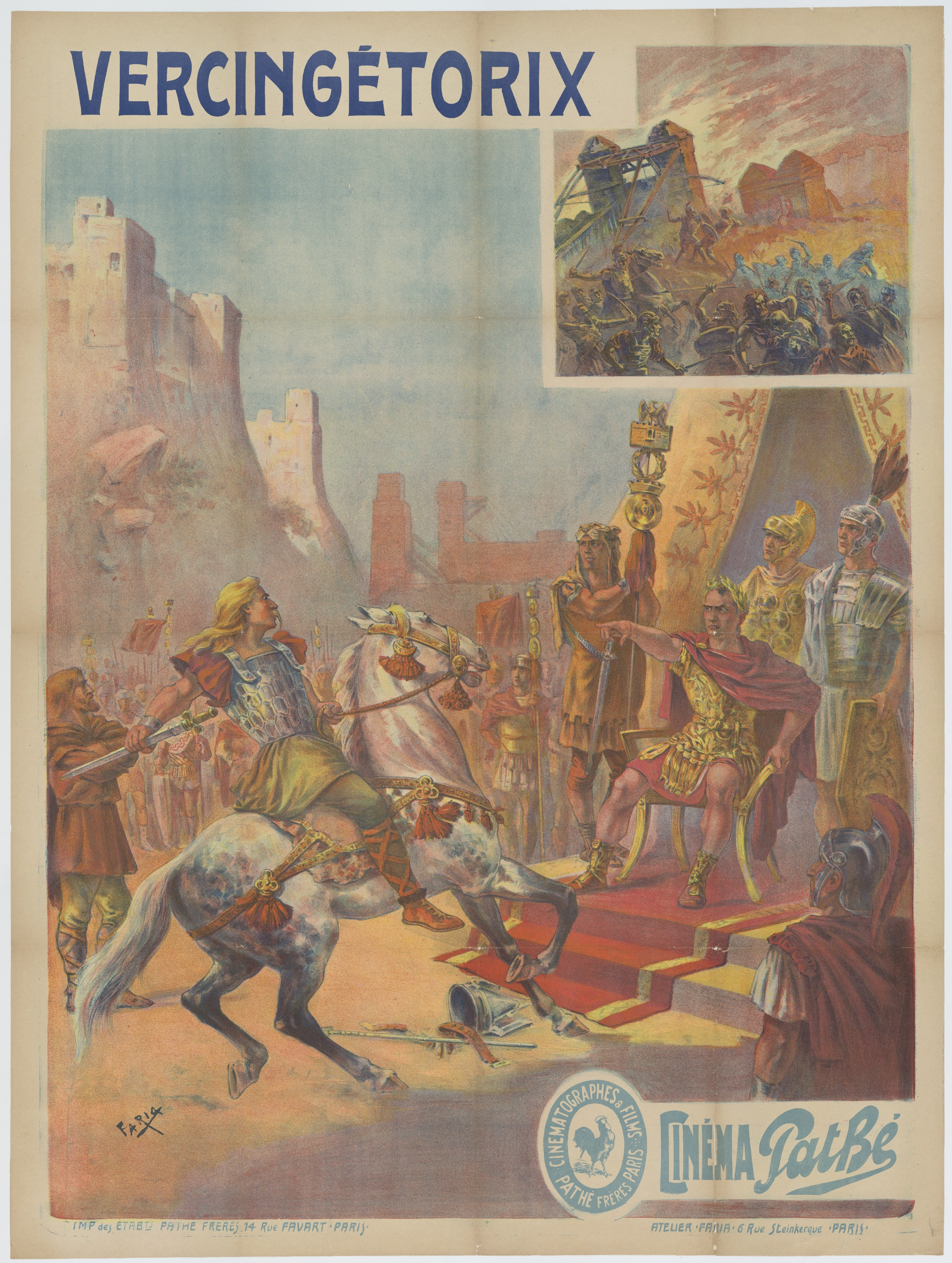
Film poster for Vercingétorix, 1909. Collection EYE Film Institute Netherlands.

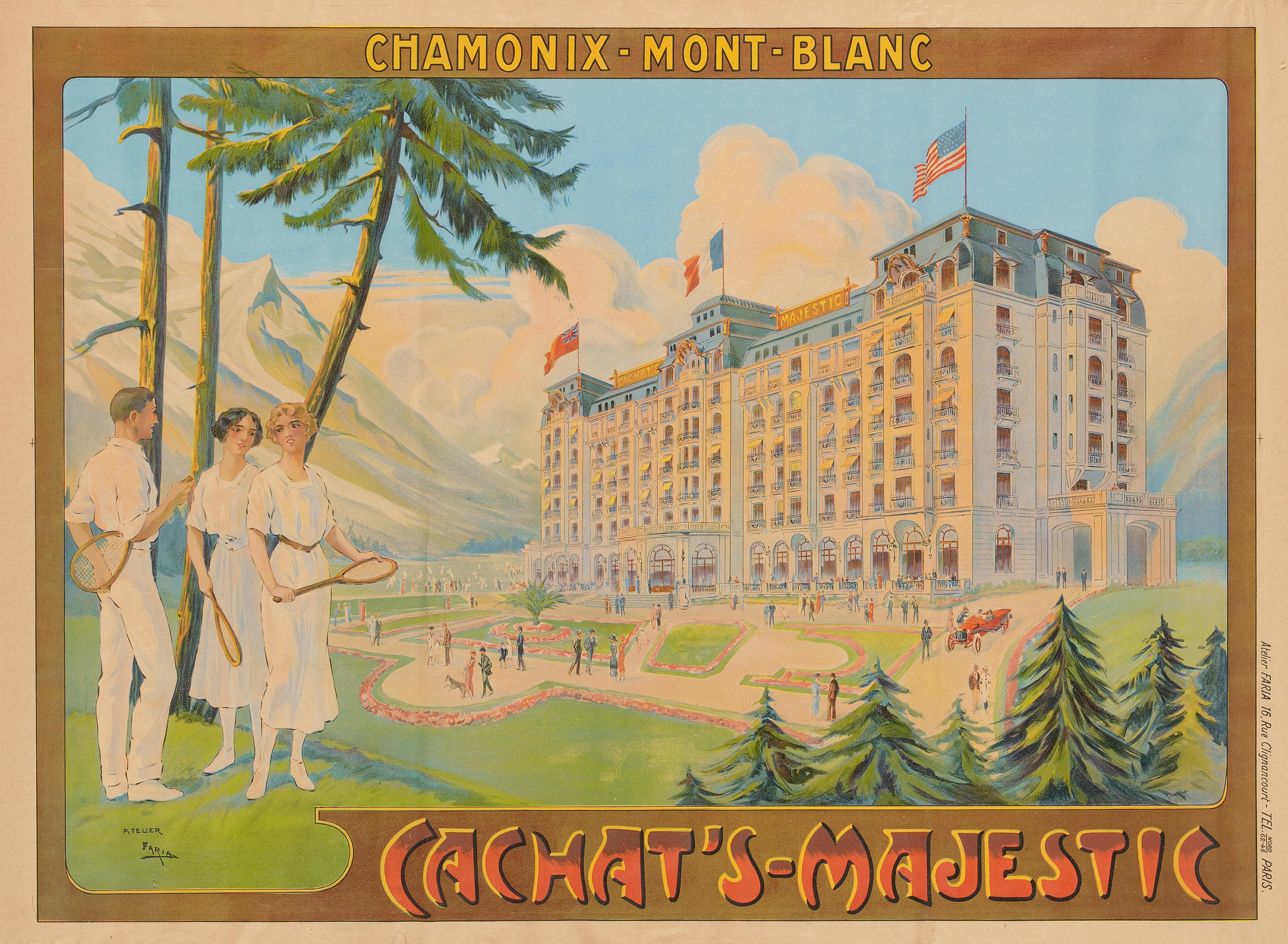
Poster for Chamonix-Mont-Blanc, Cachat's majestic hotel. Ca. 1910.

== Literature ==
- Philippe Aragonez de Faria:
  - Faria. Volume I, Biographie et oeuvre de Cândido de Faria et de Jacques de Faria, L'atelier Faria, Le Chesnay (50 rue Moxouris, 78150), 1995. etc.
  - Faria. Volume XIX, Biographie et oeuvre de Cândido de Faria et de Jacques de Faria, L'atelier Faria, Période parisienne, Le Chesnay (50 rue Moxouris, 78150), 1995.
  - Cândido de Faria, 1849-1911: un maître de l'affiche, Le Chesnay (50 rue Moxouris, 78150), 1999. Éd. commémorative du 150e anniversaire de la naissance de Cândido de Faria.
- Herman de Castro Lima, História da Caricatura Brasileira (4 vols.)
