= Laranjeiras, Sergipe =

Municipality in Sergipe, Brazil

Laranjeiras Município de Laranjeiras
- Municipality
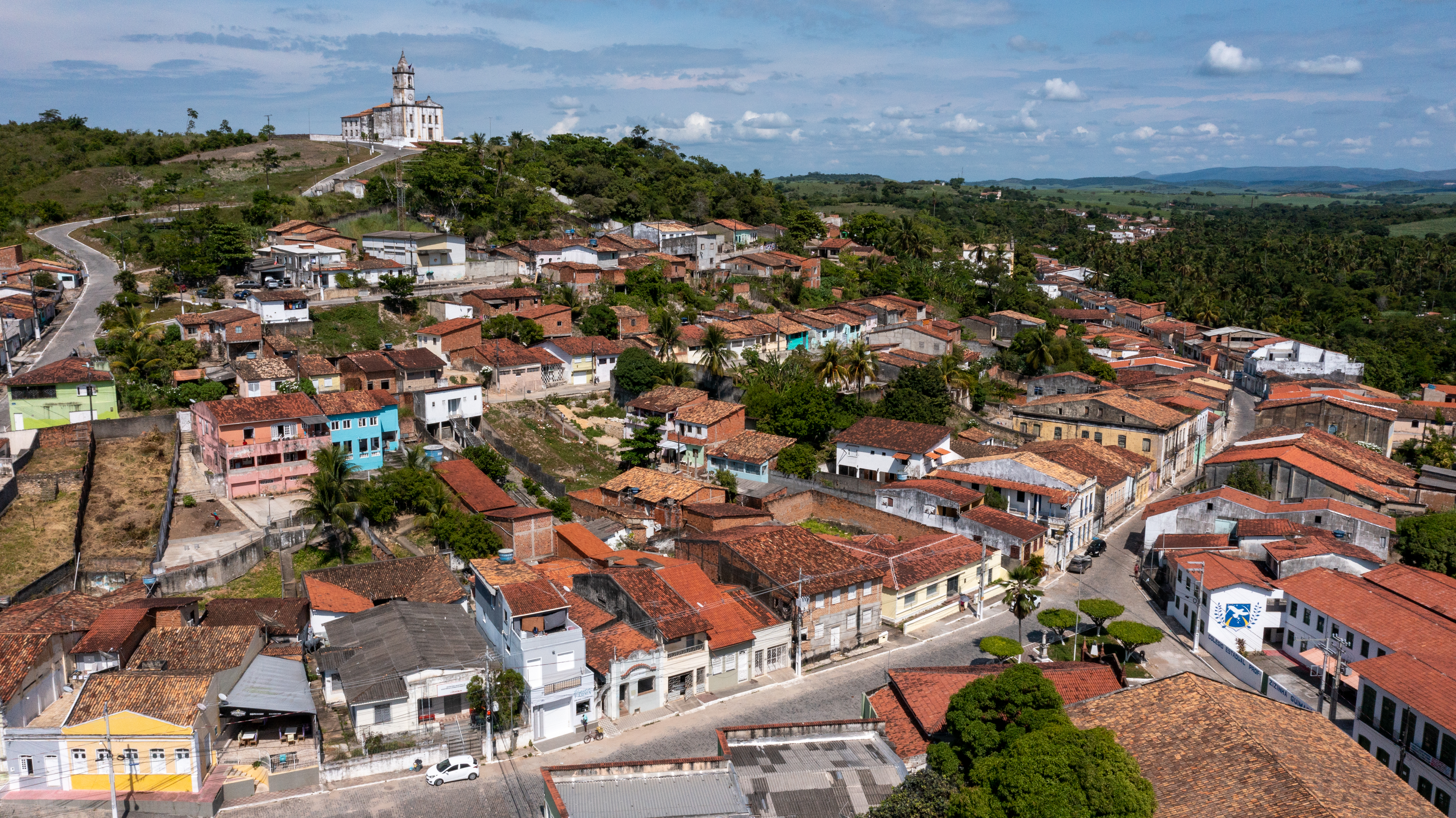
- Aerial view of Laranjeiras, 2022

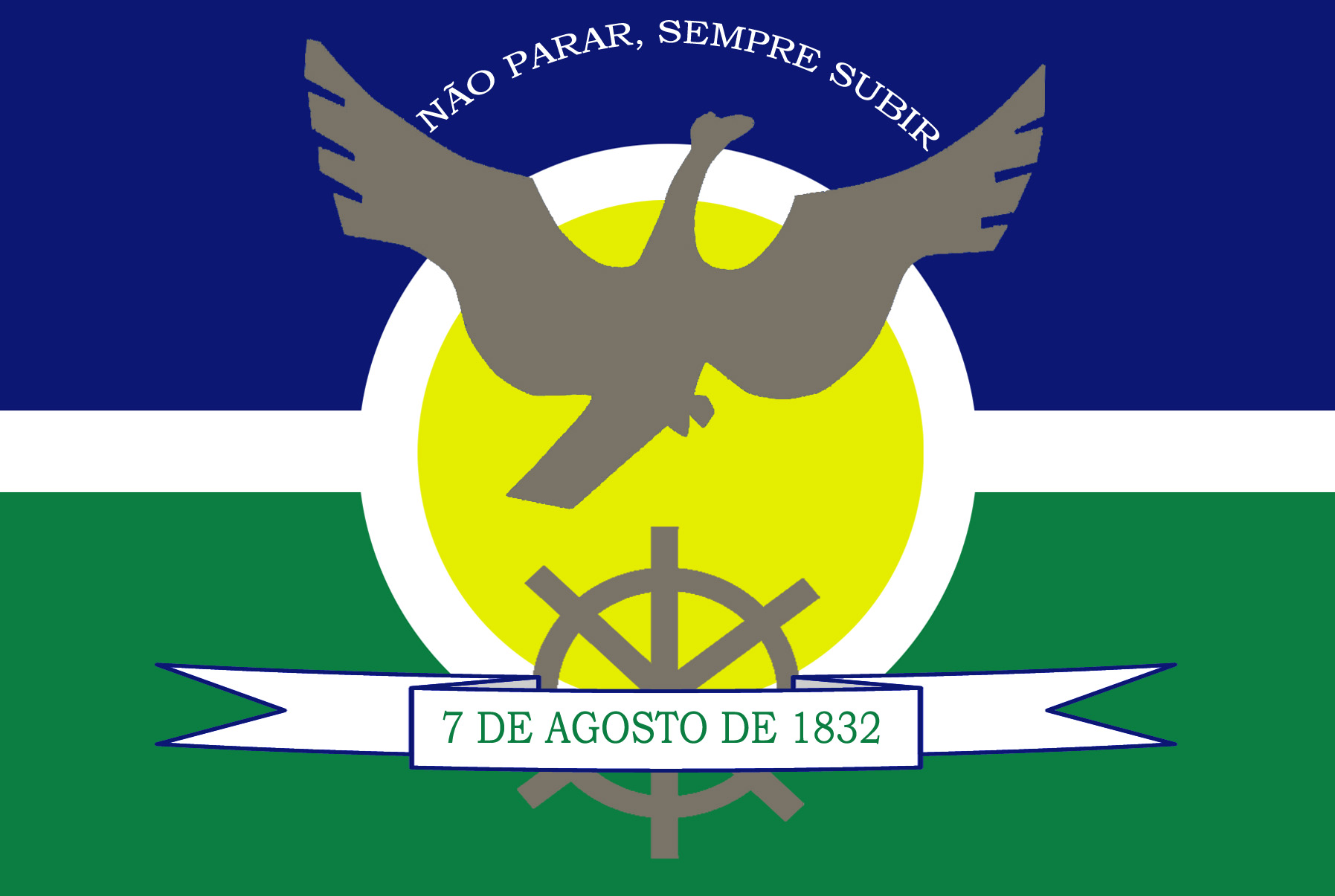
- Flag Coat of arms

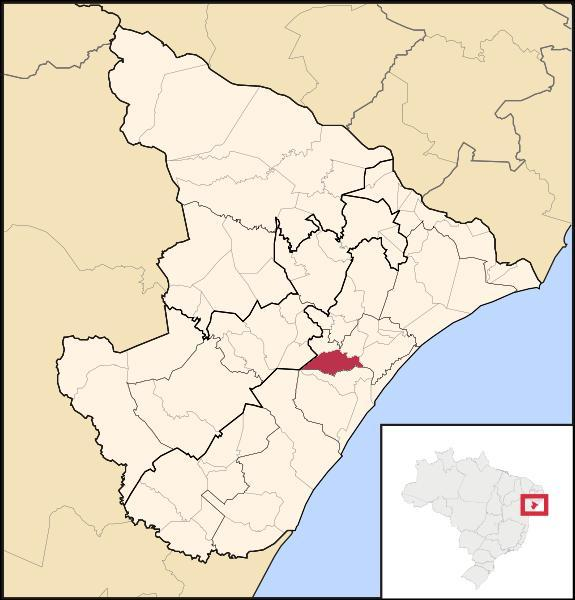
- Location of Laranjeiras in Sergipe

- Location of Laranjeiras in Brazil
- Coordinates: 10°48′21″S 37°10′12″W
- Country: Brazil
- Region: Northeast
- State: Sergipe
- Founded: August 7, 1832

Government
  - Mayor: Jose de Araujo Leite Neto

Area
  - Total: 162.27 km^{2} (62.65 sq mi)
- Elevation: 9 m (30 ft)

Population (2020)
  - Total: 30,080
  - Density: 185.4/km^{2} (480.1/sq mi)
- Demonym: Laranjeirense
- Time zone: UTC−3 (BRT)
- Website: laranjeiras.se.io.org.br

Laranjeiras (Brazilian Portuguese: [laɾɐ̃ˈʒe(j)ɾɐs]; 'Orange Trees') is a municipality located in the Brazilian state of Sergipe. Its population was 30,080 (2020) and covers 162.27 km^{2} (62.65 mi^{2}). Laranjeiras has a population density of 180 inhabitants per square kilometer. Laranjeiras is located 19 km (12 mi) from the state capital of Sergipe, Aracaju. It borders the municipalities of Riachuelo, Areia Branca, Nossa Senhora do Socorro, São Cristóvão, Maruim, and Santo Amaro das Brotas, all within the state of Sergipe. The municipality contains part of the Serra de Itabaiana National Park.

== History ==
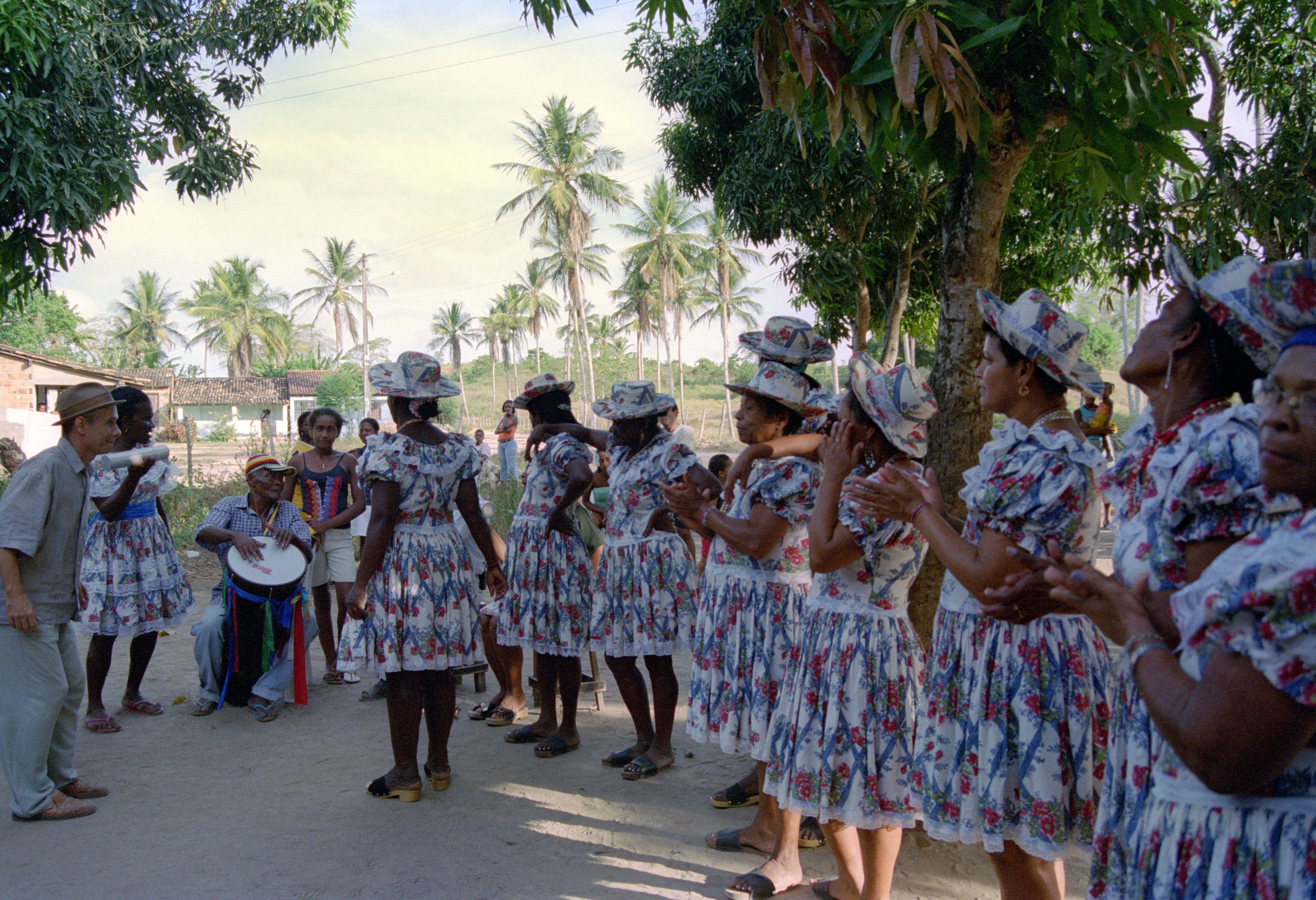
Samba de Parelha, a traditional dance in the quilombo "Mussuca", in Laranjeiras

Cristóvão de Barros killed or expelled the indigenous population of the Laranjeiras area around 1530. The Portuguese soon settled on the Cotinguiba River and built a small port, called the Porto de Laranjeiras, after numerous orange trees near the port. The port became a center of the slave trade in Sergipe as a result of its connection of the interior and the Atlantic Ocean. The region was intensively attacked by the Dutch from 1637, and they only left Sergipe in 1645 after the Dutch withdrawal from Bahia. Most of the structures of the settlement were destroyed during the Dutch occupation, but the port was preserved.

The Jesuits arrived in 1701 and built a church and convent in 1701. The Jesuits later completed a church on a high point in the town, the Church of Our Lady of the Conception of Comandaroba in 1734. The economy of Laranjeiras expanded due to the slave trade and the production of sugar cane, cattle, and coconut. A thriving regional weekly fair (feira) formed around the port and further stimulated the economy of the settlement. Plantation owners built sobrados, or large town houses, in Laranjeiras.

Residents of settlement petitioned for town (vila) status in 1824 due to the presence of 850 houses and approximately 60 sugar plantations in the region. Laranjeiras was elevated to town status and detached from Nossa Senhora do Socorro in 1832. It was elevated to city (cidade) status in 1848. The city entered steep and prolonged economic decline in 1888 as a result of the abolition of slavery in Brazil.

== Heritage sites ==
The architectural, urban and landscape set of Laranjeiras was listed by National Institute of Historic and Artistic Heritage in 1996. It consists of Portuguese colonial-era streets, churches, and residences, which in total includes approximately 500 buildings.

- Parish Church of the Sacred Heart of Jesus (Igreja Matriz do Coração de Jesus)
- Church of Our Lady of the Conception of Comandaroba (Igreja de Nossa Senhora da Conceição de Comandaroba)
- Chapel of the Jesus Maria José Sugar Plantation (Capela do Antigo Engenho Jesus, Maria e José)
- House and Chapel of the Retiro Sugar Plantation (Engenho Retiro: casa e Capela de Santo Antônio)
- Terreiro Filhos de Obá
- Grotto of Pedra Furada (Gruta da Pedra Furada)

== Notable people ==
- Cândido de Faria, illustrator who worked in Paris

== See also ==
- List of municipalities in Sergipe
