= Nossa Senhora do Socorro =

Municipality in Sergipe, Brazil

Nossa Senhora do Socorro Município de Nossa Senhora do Socorro
- Municipality
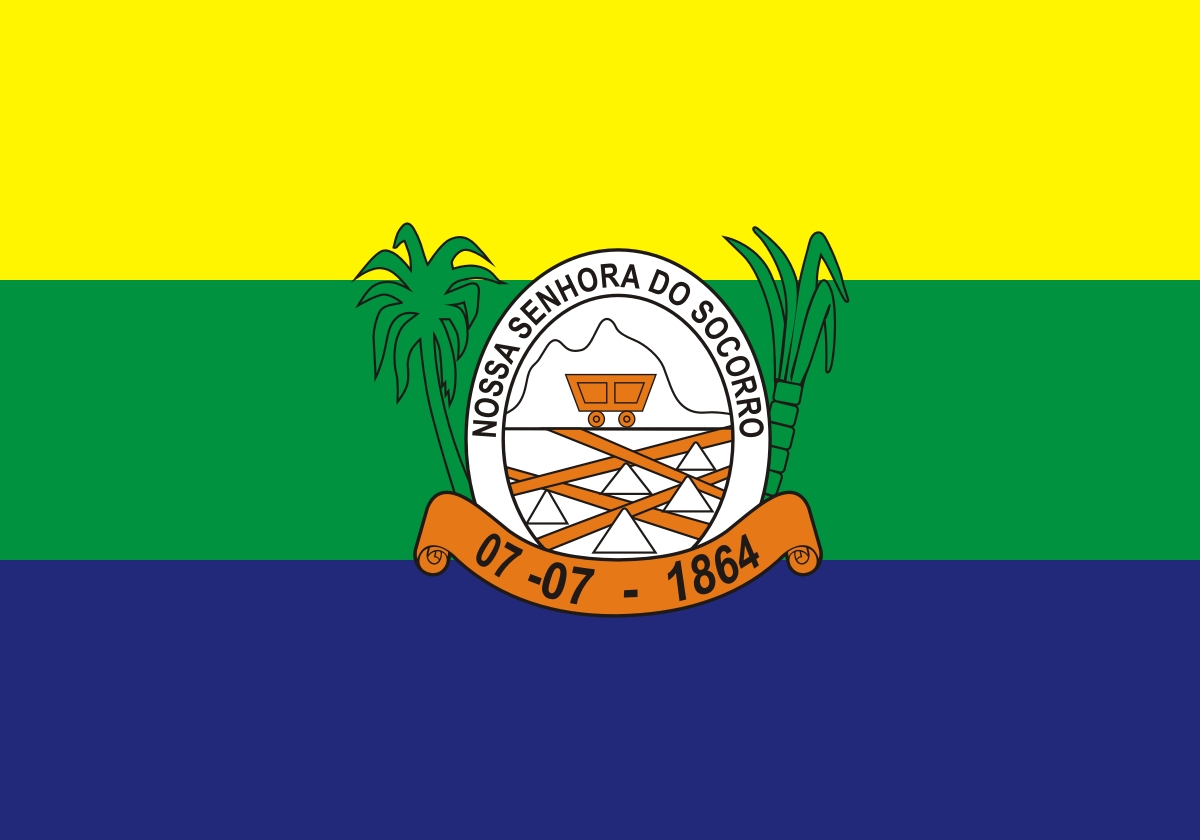
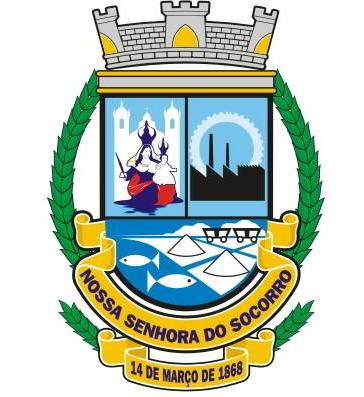
- Flag Coat of arms

- Location of Nossa Senhora do Socorro in Sergipe

- Location of Nossa Senhora do Socorro in Brazil
- Coordinates: 10°51′18″S 37°03′33″W
- Country: Brazil
- Region: Northeast
- State: Sergipe
- Founded: 1868

Government
  - Mayor: Padre Inaldo Luis da Silva

Area
  - Total: 155.02 km^{2} (59.85 sq mi)
- Elevation: 36 m (118 ft)

Population (2022 Brazilian Census)
  - Total: 192,330
  - Estimate (2025): 204,081
  - Density: 1,240.7/km^{2} (3,213.3/sq mi)
- Demonym: Socorrense
- Time zone: UTC−3 (BRT)

Nossa Senhora do Socorro (Brazilian Portuguese: [ˈnɔsɐ sẽˈɲɔɾɐ du soˈkoʁu]) is a municipality located in the Brazilian state of Sergipe. Its population was 192,330 (2022 Census) and its area is 155.02 km^{2} (59.85 mi^{2}). Nossa Senhora do Socorro is located 36 km (22 mi) from the state capital of Sergipe, Aracaju.

== See also ==
- List of municipalities in Sergipe
