= AEK Athens F.C. =

Association football club

AEK Athens
- Full name: Αθλητική Ένωσις Κωνσταντινουπόλεως; Athlitiki Enosis Konstantinoupoleos (Athletic Union of Constantinople)
- Nicknames: Dikéfalos (Double-Headed Eagle); Énosi (Union); Kitrinómavri (Yellow-Blacks)
- Short name: AEK
- Founded: 13 April 1924; 102 years ago
- Ground: Agia Sophia Stadium
- Capacity: 32,500
- Owner: Marios Iliopoulos
- President: Evangelos Aslanidis
- Head coach: Marko Nikolić
- League: Super League Greece
- 2025–26: Super League Greece, 1st of 14 (champions)
- Website: aekfc.gr
Home colours	Away colours	Third colours

AEK Football Club (Greek: Αθλητική Ένωσις Κωνσταντινουπόλεως, romanized: Athlitiki Enosis Konstantinoupoleos, lit. 'Athletic Union of Constantinople'), known simply as A.E.K. (Greek: A.E.K.; [aek]) in Greece and AEK Athens internationally, are a Greek professional football club based in Nea Filadelfeia, Attica, Greece. Part of the major multi-sport club A.E.K., the club's emblem is the double-headed eagle, the symbol of Palaiologos dynasty and the Byzantine Empire, their colours yellow and black, also inspired by the Byzantine Empire, serving to remind future generations of the glorious legacy of the Greeks of Constantinople. Their home ground is the Agia Sophia Stadium, a 32,500-capacity stadium in Nea Filadelfeia.

AEK was founded on 13 April 1924 in Athens by Greek refugees from Constantinople in the wake of the Greco-Turkish War (1919–1922) and nicknamed Énosi (Union), AEK are one of the most successful clubs in Greek football history. They have won 33 national titles (achieved 3 times the Double), their major titles are 14 Greek Championships, 16 Greek Cups, 2 Super Cups and 1 League Cup and they are the only Greek club to have won all the domestic competitions organised by the Hellenic Football Federation. AEK have also achieved three consecutive Greek Championship title wins in one occasion (1992–1994).

At the international level, the club has appeared several times in European competitions (UEFA Champions League, UEFA Europa League, UEFA Cup Winners' Cup and UEFA Conference League). They are the only Greek club to have reached the semi-finals of the UEFA Europa League (1976–77) and the quarter-finals of the UEFA Cup Winners' Cup twice (1996–97 and 1997–98). They are the first Greek club to have reached the quarter-finals of the UEFA Champions League (1968–69) and to qualify for the group stage of the institution (1994–95). AEK are also the only Greek club to have reached the quarter-finals of four European competitions. They did so in the UEFA Champions League (1968–69), UEFA Europa League (1976–77), UEFA Cup Winners' Cup (1996–97 and 1997–98) and UEFA Conference League (2025–26). The club have also reached the final of the Balkans Cup once in 1966–67.

AEK are one of the most popular football clubs in Greece, and has a strong fanbase all over the world with well over 1 million supporters.

== History ==
=== The early years (1924–1959) ===
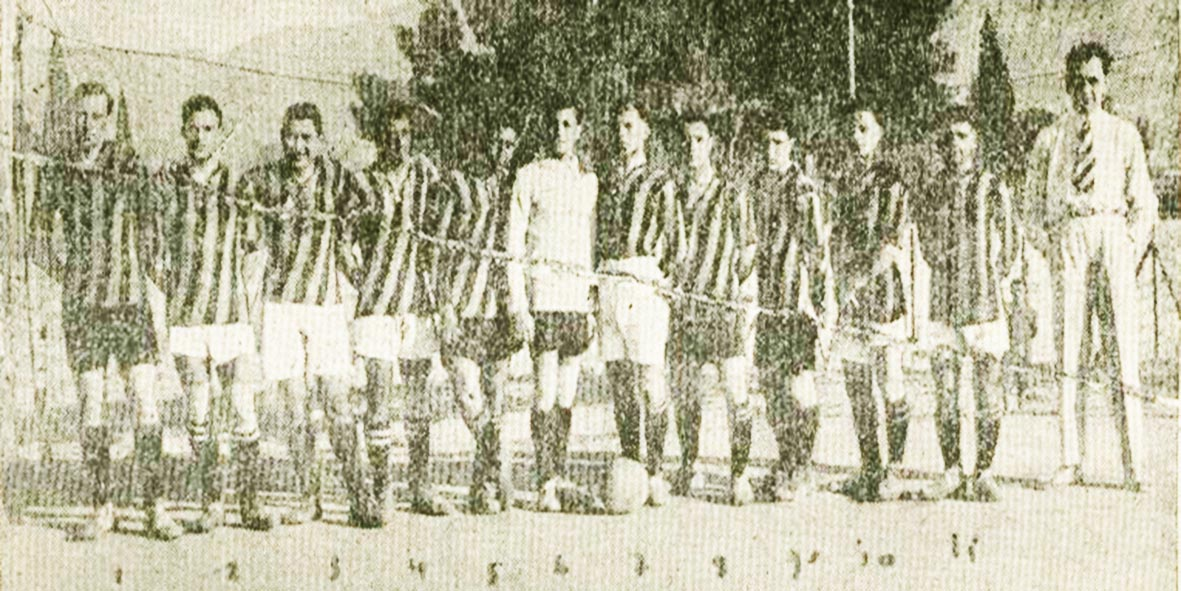
AEK's squad in 1924

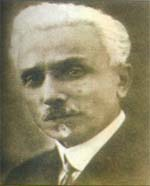
Konstantinos Spanoudis, first president of AEK.

The large Greek population of Constantinople, not unlike that of the other Ottoman urban centres, continued its athletic traditions in the form of numerous athletic clubs. Clubs such as Énosis Tatávlon (Ένωσις Ταταύλων) and Iraklís (Ηρακλής) from the Tatavla district, Mégas Aléxandros (Μέγας Αλέξανδρος) and Ermís (Ερμής) of Galata, and Olympiás (Ολυμπιάς) of Therapia existed to promote Hellenic athletic and cultural ideals. These were amongst a dozen Greek-backed clubs that dominated the sporting landscape of the city in the years preceding World War I. After the war, with the influx of mainly French and British soldiers to Constantinople, many of the city's clubs participated in regular competitions with teams formed by foreign troops. Taxim, Pera, and Tatavla became the scene of weekly competitions in not only football, but also athletics, cycling, boxing, and tennis.

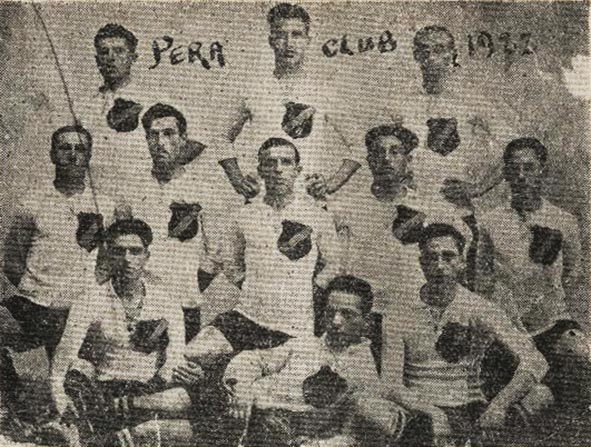
Players of Pera Club. Kostas Negrepontis is on the left.

Football in the city was dominated by Énosis Tatávlon and Ermís. Ermís, one of the most popular sports clubs, was formed in 1875 by the Greek community of Pera (Galata). Known as "Pera" since the mid-1880s, and "The Greek Football Team" when their football department was formed in 1914, they were forced to change its name to "Pera Sports Club", and then "Beyoğluspor Kulübü" in 1923. Many of its athletes, and those of most other sporting clubs, fled during the population exchanges at the end of the Greco-Turkish War, settling in Athens and Thessaloniki.

The founders of AEK – a group of Constantinopolitan refugees (among them former athletes from the Pera Sports Club and the other Constantinopolitan clubs) – met at the athletic shop "Lux" owned by Emilios Ionas and Konstantinos Dimopoulos on Veranzerou Street, in the centre of Athens, and created AEK. Their intention was to create a club that provided athletic and cultural diversions for the thousands of predominantly Constantinopolitan and Anatolian refugees who had settled in the new suburbs of Athens (including Nea Filadelfeia, Nea Ionia, Nea Chalkidona, Nea Smyrni).

The first AEK team was: Goalkeeper Kitsos; Defenders Ieremiadis and Asderis; Midfielders Kechagias, Paraskevas, Dimopoulos, and Karagiannidis; and Forwards Baltas, Milas, Ippiadis, and Georgiadis. AEK played their first match against Aias Athens on 23 November 1924, where they won by 2–0.

AEK's football team grew rapidly in popularity during the 1920s, eclipsing the already-established Athens-based refugee clubs (Panionios, Apollon Athens, etc.), thanks mainly to the large pool of immigrants that were drawn to the club, the significance of the name "Constantinople" for many refugees and Greeks, plus, in no small part, to the political connections and wealth of several of the club's board members. Not possessing a football ground, AEK played most of its early matches at various locations around Athens, including the grounds of the Temple of Olympian Zeus and the Leoforos Alexandras Stadium.

AEK's first president, Konstantinos Spanoudis, a journalist and associate of the Prime Minister Eleftherios Venizelos, petitioned the government to set aside land for the establishment of a sports ground. In 1926, land in Nea Filadelfeia, which was originally set aside for refugee housing, was donated as a training ground for the refugees' sports activities. AEK began using the ground for training, albeit unofficially.

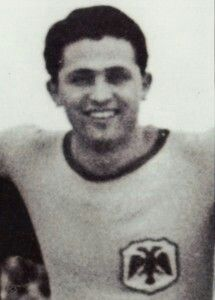
Tryfon Tzanetis

In 1928, Panathinaikos, Olympiacos, and AEK began a dispute with the fledgling Hellenic Football Federation (EPO), decided to break away from the Athens regional league, and formed an alliance called POK. During the dispute, POK organised friendly matches against each other and several continental European clubs. In 1929, though, the dispute ended and AEK, along with the other POK clubs, entered the EPO fold once again.

In 1930, the property where AEK trained was officially signed over to the club. Venizelos soon approved the plans to build what was to become AEK's home ground for the next 70 years, the AEK Stadium. The first home game, in November 1930, was an exhibition match against Olympiacos that ended in a 2–2 draw.

In 1932, AEK won their first Greek Cup title, beating Aris 5–3 in the final. The team boasted a number of star football players like Kostas Negrepontis (a veteran of the original Pera Club of Constantinople), Kleanthis Maropoulos, Tryfon Tzanetis, Michalis Delavinias, Giorgos Mageiras and Spyros Sklavounos.

The club's mixed success during the 1930s was highlighted by the first Greek Championship and Greek Cup (winning the double) in 1939. Under former player Kostas Negrepontis as manager, AEK also won the Greek Championship of 1940.

On 28 October 1940 all sports competitions were interrupted due to the Greco-Italian War. In a battle at Pogradec, the player of AEK, Kostas Valvanis was badly injured by a mortar bomb, while Alekos Chatzistavridis seriously injured his leg during a battle in Tepelenë. After the Battle of Greece and during the Axis occupation of Greece sporting events were scarce. In the spring of 1942 Panathinaikos and AEK were to give a friendly match to raise money for a hospital but were asked to give part of the revenue to the occupation forces, which the captains of both clubs, Kritikos and Maropoulos refused it turned into one of the largest protests of the time. The match became known as the "Resistance Derby".

In June 1944 AEK player Spyros Kontoulis was killed by the Nazi forces during his attempt to escape while being transported to Kaisariani in order to be executed for being part of the resistance.

Under manager Jack Beby, along with new players such as Kostas Poulis, Goulios and Pavlos Emmanouilidis, AEK won the Cup of 1949 and 1950, beating Panathinaikos by 2–1 and Aris by 4–0. AEK won also the AFCA championship in 1950, but the Panhellenic Championship was not played, due to obligations of the national team. The early 1950s saw the addition of star footballers such as Giannis Kanakis, Andreas Stamatiadis and Stelios Serafidis.

In 1955, AEK signed the best player of his era, Kostas Nestoridis, but his former team Panionios did not consent to the transfer, thus Nestoridis was banned for two seasons, due to the law of the time. In his first season at the club Nestoridis showing his class, finished as the top scorer of the league, while AEK won the Cup in 1956, defeating Olympiacos by 2–1 in the final.

=== The early Alpha Ethniki years (1959–1974) ===
With Kostas Nestoridis scoring goals in the early 1960s (top goalscorer for 5 seasons in row, from 1958 to 1963), and the timely signing of attacker Mimis Papaioannou (the club's all-time top goalscorer and record appearance maker) in 1962, AEK went on to win the 1962–63 championship. Known affectionately as "Mimis" by the AEK supporters, Papaioannou scored twice in the 1963 playoff against Panathinaikos, leveling the score at 3–3 and giving AEK its first post-war championship on goal aggregate. Coached by Hungarian-German Jenő Csaknády, the championship team also consisted of Stelios Serafidis, Miltos Papapostolou, and Andreas Stamatiadis. Youngsters like Alekos Sofianidis, Stelios Skevofilakas, Giorgos Petridis, and Manolis Kanellopoulos played a significant role in the victorious 1963 campaign.

The club followed up with Cup victories in 1964 and 1966. With the return of Csaknády to the position of the manager in 1968 and the addition of prominent players like Kostas Nikolaidis, Giorgos Karafeskos, Panagiotis Ventouris, Fotis Balopoulos, Spyros Pomonis, Alekos Iordanou, Nikos Stathopoulos and Andreas Papaemmanouil, AEK easily won the 1967–68 championship.

==== European Cup quarter-finalists ====
In the 1968–69 season AEK, under Yugoslav manager Branko Stanković, became the first Greek football club to reach the quarter-finals of the European Champions Cup, but were eliminated by the Czechoslovak Spartak Trnava.

The addition of goalkeeper Stelios Konstantinidis and Apostolos Toskas reinforced the team, and allowed AEK to take their fifth championship title in 1971.

=== The Barlos ownership years (1974–1981) ===
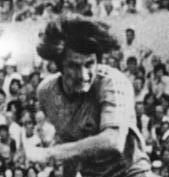
Dušan Bajević

Loukas Barlos, a successful industrialist, took over the presidency and financing of AEK in 1974, and with the help of manager František Fadrhonc built one of the finest teams in the club's history. The Barlos "Golden Era" saw some of the greatest players ever to have played for AEK: Christos Ardizoglou, Giorgos Dedes, Giorgos Skrekis, the Germans Walter Wagner and Timo Zahnleiter, Dionysis Tsamis, Lakis Nikolaou, Petros Ravousis, Dušan Bajević, Takis Nikoloudis, Stefanos Theodoridis, Babis Intzoglou, Nikos Christidis, and Thomas Mavros.

==== UEFA Cup semi-finalists ====
Captained by Papaioannou in the 1976–1977 season, AEK reached the semi-finals of the UEFA Cup competition, the first Greek football club to do so. Beating Dynamo Moscow (Russia) 2–0, Derby County (England) 2–0 and 3–2, Red Star Belgrade (Yugoslavia) 2–0, and QPR (England) 3–0 and 7–6 on penalties, AEK were eventually eliminated by Gianni Agnelli's Juventus. Juventus went on to win their first European title.

==== Thomas Mavros: a goal-machine ====
It was during this period that AEK signed one of Greece's finest strikers, Thomas Mavros, the all-time top goalscorer in the Greek Championship. In the following years, he and Dušan Bajević formed a formidable attacking duo for AEK. Mavros was an integral part of the team that reached the UEFA Cup semi-finals in 1976, but it was his devastating form (top goalscorer in 1978 and 1979 – 22 and 31 goals, respectively) that helped AEK to win the 1977–78 Championship-Cup double. The addition of former Panathinaikos stars Domazos and Eleftherakis to the AEK squad the following year saw the club cap off their most successful decade to date by winning the 1979 Championship.

Under the leadership of Loukas Barlos, the AEK Stadium was finally completed with the addition of the iconic covered stand, or Skepasti (Σκεπαστή), which eventually became home to the most fanatic of AEK supporter groups, "Original 21". The next generation of star players, fresh out of AEK's Academy, made their debut during this period: Stelios Manolas, Spyros Ikonomopoulos, Vangelis Vlachos, and Lysandros Georgamlis.

=== The post-Barlos sterile years (1981–1988) ===
After the departure of Loukas Barlos in the ownership of the club was taken over by sports goods businessman, Andreas Zafiropoulos. The club went on for two seasons without claiming any titles or distinctions. In the summer of 1982, Zafiropoulos stepped out of the presidency, which was handed over to the shipowner, Michalis Arkadis. With the Austrian manager Helmut Senekowitsch, who was hired in mid-season, AEK won the 1983 Cup, beating PAOK 2–0 in the newly built Athens Olympic Stadium. Thomas Mavros and Vangelis Vlachos were the goalscorers. After a destructive season under the presidency of the Cypriot travel agency owner, Lefteris Panagidis, Andreas Zafiropoulos returned at the position of the president in 1984. Despite the signing of players such as Håkan Sandberg, Nikos Pias, Theologis Papadopoulos, Makis Chatzis and Márton Esterházy the club finished third. With the magical triplet of Mavros-Sandberg-Esterházy in the team's offense and under the new manager Jacek Gmoch, AEK were able to defeat Real Madrid by 1–0 at home for the first round of the UEFA Cup. Nevertheless, they were eliminated by the Spanish club in the rematch and in the league they barely finished third, winning Iraklis in a play-off match. They following season was marked as one of the worst in the club's history as the club finished seventh in the league with two managerial changes, in the faces of Ab Fafié and Nikos Alefantos. The latter spoke out against Mavros, considering him "finished" as a footballer, which led in the departure of Mavros, after 11 years in the club.

In the summer of 1987 Todor Veselinović was hired for the position of the manager while Giorgos Savvidis, Henrik Nielsen and Georgios Koutoulas arrived. AEK were in the title race, with their only contenders being AEL. The footballer of AEL, Georgi Tsingov, was tested positive in a doping test and the case was transferred to the courts becoming known as the "Tsingov case". There, AEL were initially punished with zeroing for the match, a two-point deduction and punishment of the player, which brought AEK to the top of the table. AEL appealed with their fans rallied, resulting in the alteration of the regulation overnight and the return of the points, which led in their eventual conquest of the championship. In the last match of the season at Nea Filadelfeia, the tension between the ultras and Zafiropoulos peaked, when the riot police invaded the ultra's stand, resulting in heated encounters. That led in Zafiropoulos stepping away from the presidency.

=== Golden Years (1988–1997) ===
In the summer of 1988, the new president Stratos Gidopoulos appointed the former player Dušan Bajević and with signings such as Mirosław Okoński and Antonis Minou built a well-worked team. AEK clinched the title after winning a crucial match 1–0 against Olympiacos at the Athens Olympic Stadium. Takis Karagiozopoulos scored the goal that gave AEK their first Championship after ten years. The following season with the addition of Daniel Batista AEK won also the Greek Super Cup of 1989, beating Panathinaikos on penalties after the match ended in a 1–1 draw and the League Cup winning Olympiacos by 3–2, in an institution that took place only once.

In 1991, AEK faced administrative problems which led Gidopoulos to resign and a temporary administration led by Kostas Generakis took charge. The new administration put the club's finances in order and at the same time proceeded with the transfers of Refik Šabanadžović, Vasilis Dimitriadis and Alexis Alexandris. AEK Stadium was renamed to "Nikos Goumas Stadium". Under Bajević, the team presented a solid performance and won the title, with Dimitriadis finishing as the top scorer of the league. After the season was over, Dimitris Melissanidis and Giannis Karras purchased the shares of Zafiropoulos. In the summer of 1992, the new owners of the club, helped the club recover financially and supported Bajević with siginings such as Zoran Slišković, Tasos Mitropoulos and Ilias Atmatsidis, while in December Vasilios Tsiartas and Charis Kopitsis also arrived. AEK won the title for the second consecutive season with a 1-point difference from Panathinaikos. Dimitriadis emerged again as the league's top scorer with 33 goals, winning the European Silver Shoe. In the following season, Bajević decided to make a renewal in the roster, signing the youngsters Vasilios Borbokis and Michalis Kasapis. AEK won the championship and with three successive championship wins, established themselves as one of the most successful periods in their history. Alexis Alexandris alongside Krzysztof Warzycha of Panathinaikos were the top scorers of the league.

==== First Greek presence in the UEFA Champions League group stage ====
In 1994–95, AEK became the first Greek football club to participate in the group stage of the UEFA Champions League after defeating Scottish champions, Rangers; AEK were eliminated by Ajax and AC Milan, who made it to the final. With Michalis Trochanas as president and Dušan Bajević as manager, the club won the Greek Cup in 1996.

Former player Petros Ravousis took over the position of the manager when Dušan Bajević left for Olympiacos at the end of 1996. By far AEK's most successful run with titles, the period also saw the club sign Temur Ketsbaia and several young, talented players like Demis Nikolaidis, Christos Kostis, Christos Maladenis and Akis Zikos. Nikolaidis, in particular, an AEK fan since childhood, declined more lucrative offers from Olympiacos and Panathinaikos to sign for his beloved club. During the 1996–97 and 1997–98 seasons, AEK progressed to the quarter-finals of the UEFA Cup Winners' Cup, where they were eliminated by Paris Saint-Germain and Lokomotiv Moscow. Ravousis led the team to its second Super Cup in 1996, and its eleventh Cup title in 1997, beating Panathinaikos in both finals.

=== ENIC ownership years (1997–2004) ===
Trochanas no longer being support financially the club, was looking for a buyer, sold his shares to the financially powerful, English multinational ENIC.

In 1999, ex-president Dimitris Melissanidis, took over the management of the club, organised a friendly match against Partizan in Belgrade, during the height of the NATO bombing of Serbia. As a gesture of compassion and solidarity towards the embattled Serbs, the AEK players and management staff defied the international embargo and traveled to Belgrade for the match. The game ended 1–1, when after 60 minutes thousands of Serbian football fans invaded the pitch to embrace the footballers.

AEK won its twelfth Cup title in 2000 under the manager Giannis Pathiakakis, defeating Ionikos 3–0 in the final. The club continued its consistency in the Championship of 2001–02, finishing second on goal difference behind Olympiacos, and beating Olympiacos in the Greek Cup final.

==== 2002–03 UEFA Champions League unbeaten run ====
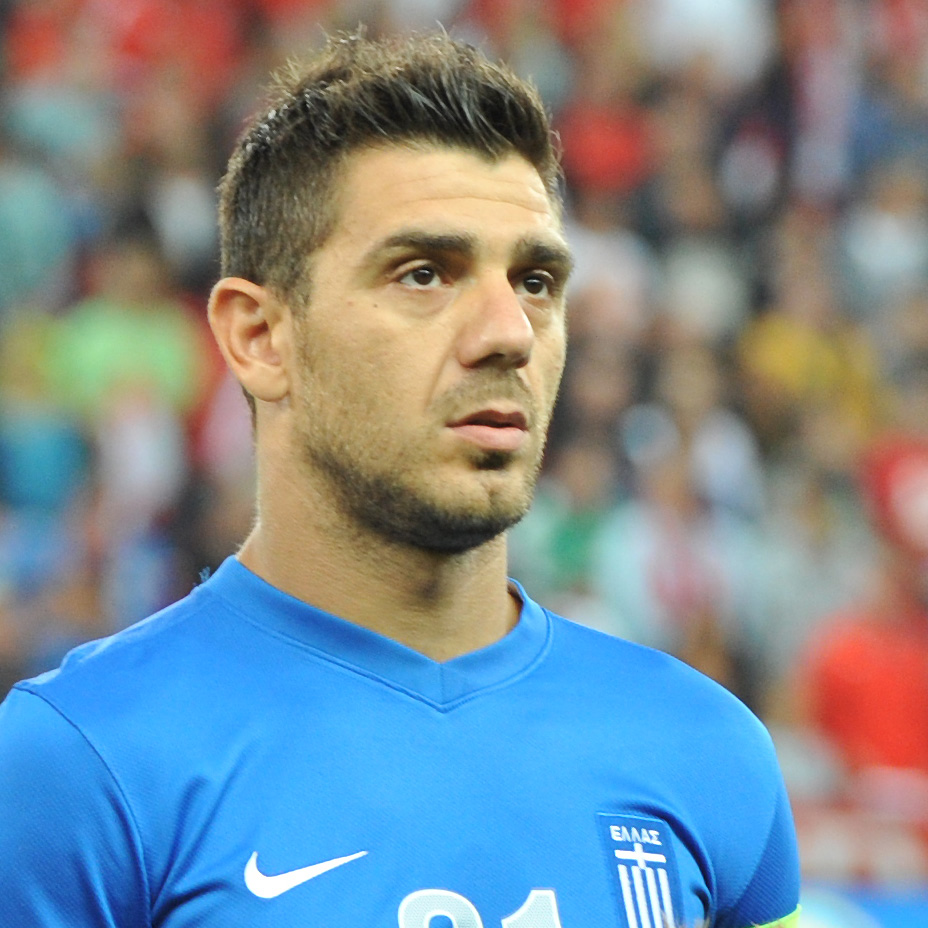
Kostas Katsouranis

Dušan Bajević returned as manager in the summer of 2002, a move that sparked open hostility towards Bajević from a section of AEK supporters. A strong team, called Dream Team by the fans, was created with players like Kostas Katsouranis, Ilija Ivić, Dionysis Chiotis, Vasilios Borbokis, Grigoris Georgatos, Theodoros Zagorakis, Walter Centeno, Michalis Kapsis, Michel Kreek, Vasilios Lakis, Vasilios Tsiartas (who returned from Sevilla), Ioannis Okkas, Nikos Liberopoulos and Demis Nikolaidis.

Under Bajević, AEK progressed through the qualifying rounds in the 2002 UEFA Champions League by eliminating APOEL. Drawn in Group A with AS Roma, Real Madrid, and Racing Genk, AEK with good performances drew all their games and were knocked out of the competition. They continued to UEFA Cup, eliminating Maccabi Haifa (4–0, 4–1) before being knocked out by Málaga CF.

Off the pitch, the administration of Makis Psomiadis caused many problems for AEK, whose mismanagement put the club into debt. He was also accused of assaulting club captain, Demis Nikolaidis and other players with the assistance of his bodyguards.

After the altercation, and partly due to the club's growing financial problems, Nikolaidis left on a free transfer by mutual consent to Atlético Madrid. Unable to cope with the negativity from a large section of AEK fans, Bajević resigned in 2004 in the middle of a match against Iraklis.

=== The Demis Nikolaidis era (2004–2008) ===
In 2004, Demis Nikolaidis and other significant AEK followers formed a supporters' club Enosis 1924 (Union 1924) to motivate all AEK supporters into taking up the club's shares and governance. The project was not fully realised because, in the meantime, various businessmen decided to buy shares and invest money in the club. However, to this date, Enosis 1924's chairman is a member of the AEK Athens board. The same year, Nikos Goumas Stadium, AEK's home stadium for over 70 years, was demolished, large parts of it having been damaged by the 1999 Athens earthquake.

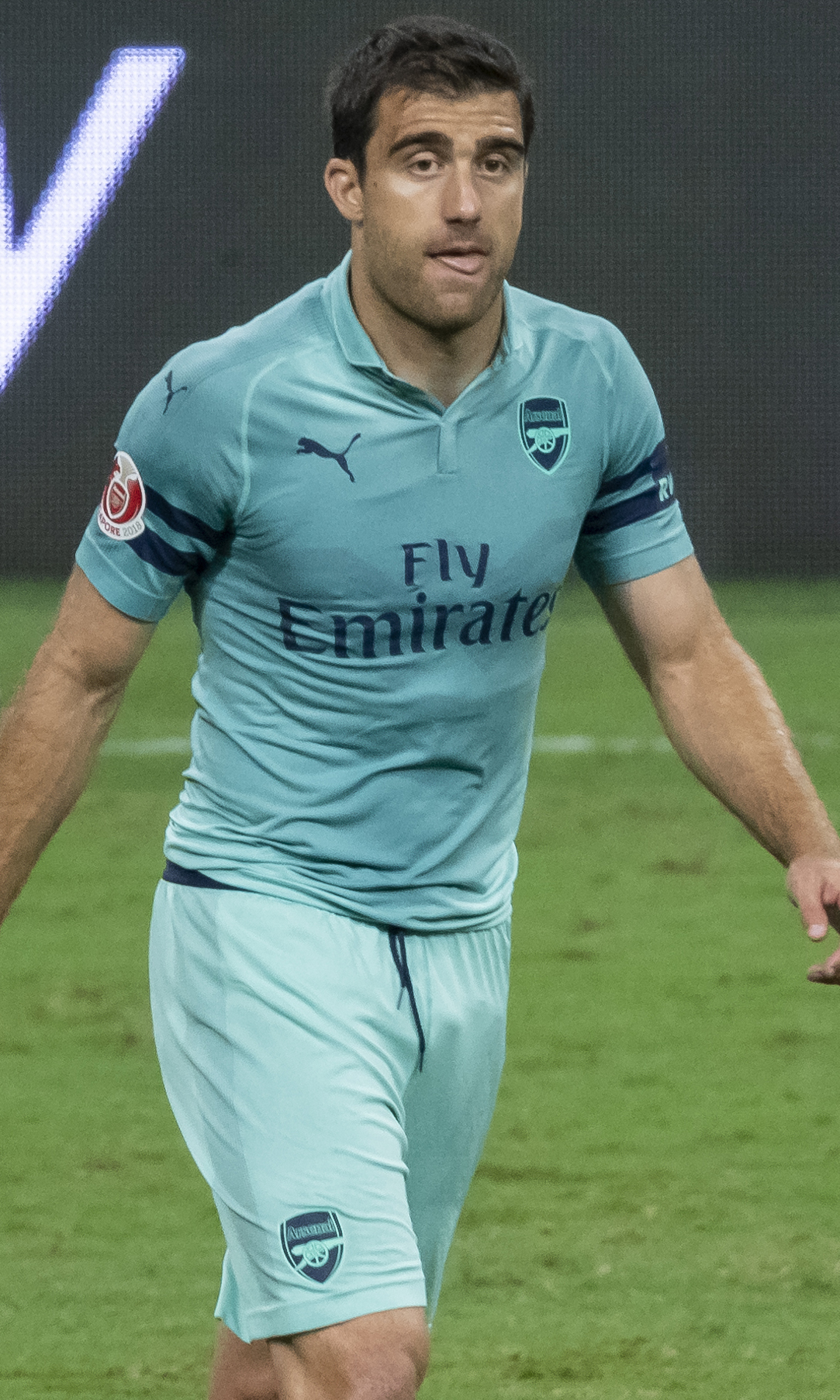
Sokratis Papastathopoulos

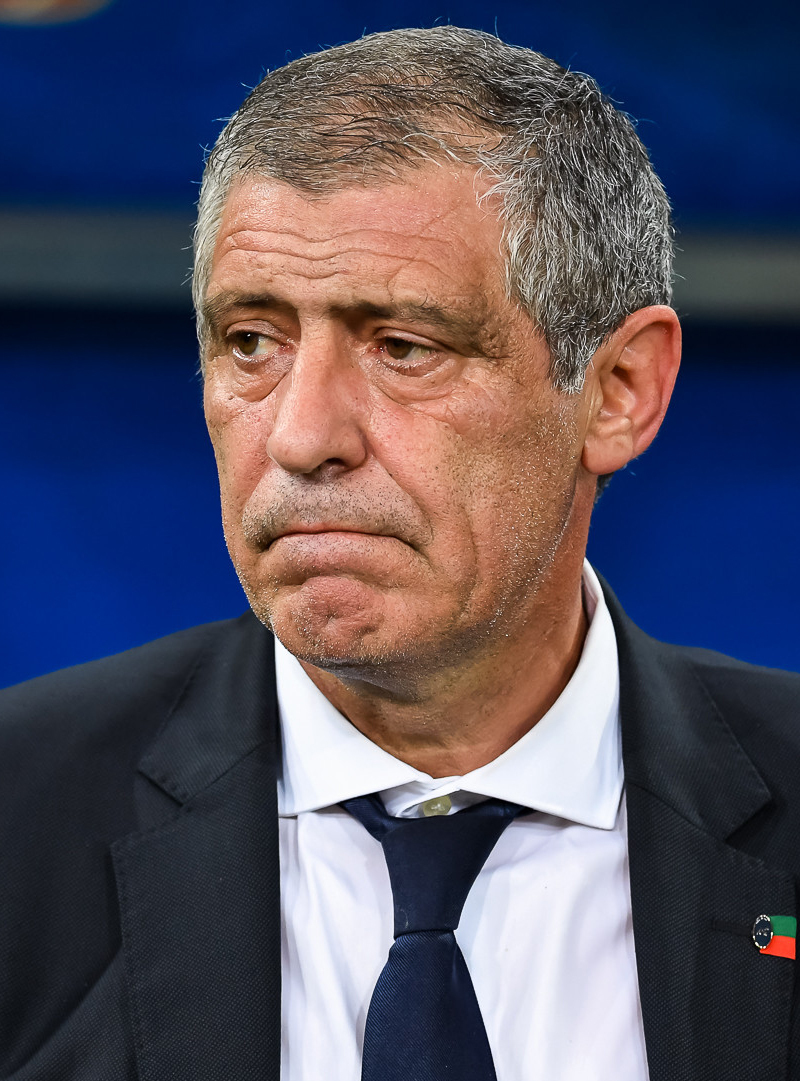
Fernando Santos

In 2004, on the back of strong AEK fan support, Nikolaidis, at the head of a consortium of businessmen, bought out the beleaguered club and became the new president. His primary task was to lead AEK out of its precarious financial position. The first success was an arrangement through the Greek judicial system to write off most of the massive debt that previous club administrators had amassed and to repay any remaining public debts in manageable installments.

Securing the club's existence in the Alpha Ethniki, Nikolaidis then began a program to rebuild AEK to its former glory. He appointed experienced former player Ilija Ivić as technical director and brought back Fernando Santos as a manager. The AEK fans, emboldened by Nikolaidis' efforts, followed suit by buying season ticket packages in record numbers (over 17,000).

AEK recruited promising young players to strengthen a depleted team. Led by the experienced Katsouranis and Liberopoulos, and featuring Brazilian Júlio César, the club made it to the Greek Cup final for the seventh time in 13 years but finished second in the Championship, and in the process, secured a place in the third qualifying round of the UEFA Champions League. For the 2006–07 season, former Real Betis manager Lorenzo Serra Ferrer was appointed as manager after Fernando Santos' contract was not renewed.

By beating Hearts over both legs (2–1 in Scotland and 3–0 in Greece), AEK progressed to the group stage of the Champions League. The club obtained a total of 8 points, having beaten AC Milan 1–0, Lille 1–0, and managing two draws with Anderlecht (1–1 in Greece and 2–2 in Belgium). AEK finished second in the Greek Super League, qualifying again for the third round in the UEFA Champions League.

==== 2007–08 Championship controversy ====
For the 2007–08 season AEK changed kit sponsors from Adidas to Puma. They played with Sevilla FC in the UEFA Champions League third qualifying round. The first leg was played on 15 August, away at the Ramón Sánchez Pizjuán, where AEK were defeated by 2 goals, and the second leg played on 3 September, at the Athens Olympic Stadium where AEK lost again by 1–4.

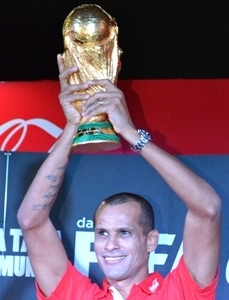
Rivaldo

AEK completed the signings of Brazilian legend Rivaldo, after he was let free from Olympiacos, Rodolfo Arruabarrena, Charis Pappas, and Argentine striker Ismael Blanco. Traianos Dellas was rewarded with a new contract, keeping him at the club until the summer of 2009. On 25 August, the Super League and EPO decided to postpone the opening season's games due to the fire disaster in the Peloponnese.

After being eliminated from the UEFA Champions League, AEK were drawn to play against FC Salzburg in the UEFA Cup. On 20 September, AEK claimed a home win over Salzburg by the scoreline of 3–0. In the second leg, played in Salzburg on 4 October, AEK lost the match but still went through 3–1 on aggregate. On 9 October, AEK were drawn in Group C in the UEFA Cup group stage along with Villarreal, Fiorentina, Mladá Boleslav, and Elfsborg. On 25 October, AEK kicked off the group stage with a 1–1 draw away to Elfsborg. On 29 November, AEK again drew 1–1, this time at home to Fiorentina. On 5 December, AEK won Mladá Boleslav 1–0 away and on 20 December, AEK were defeated at home with 1–2 by Villarreal, but finally booked a place in the knockout stage of the UEFA Cup by finishing third in the group. They were then drawn against Getafe in the third round (phase of 32). AEK advanced to the third round of the UEFA Cup for the second consecutive season.

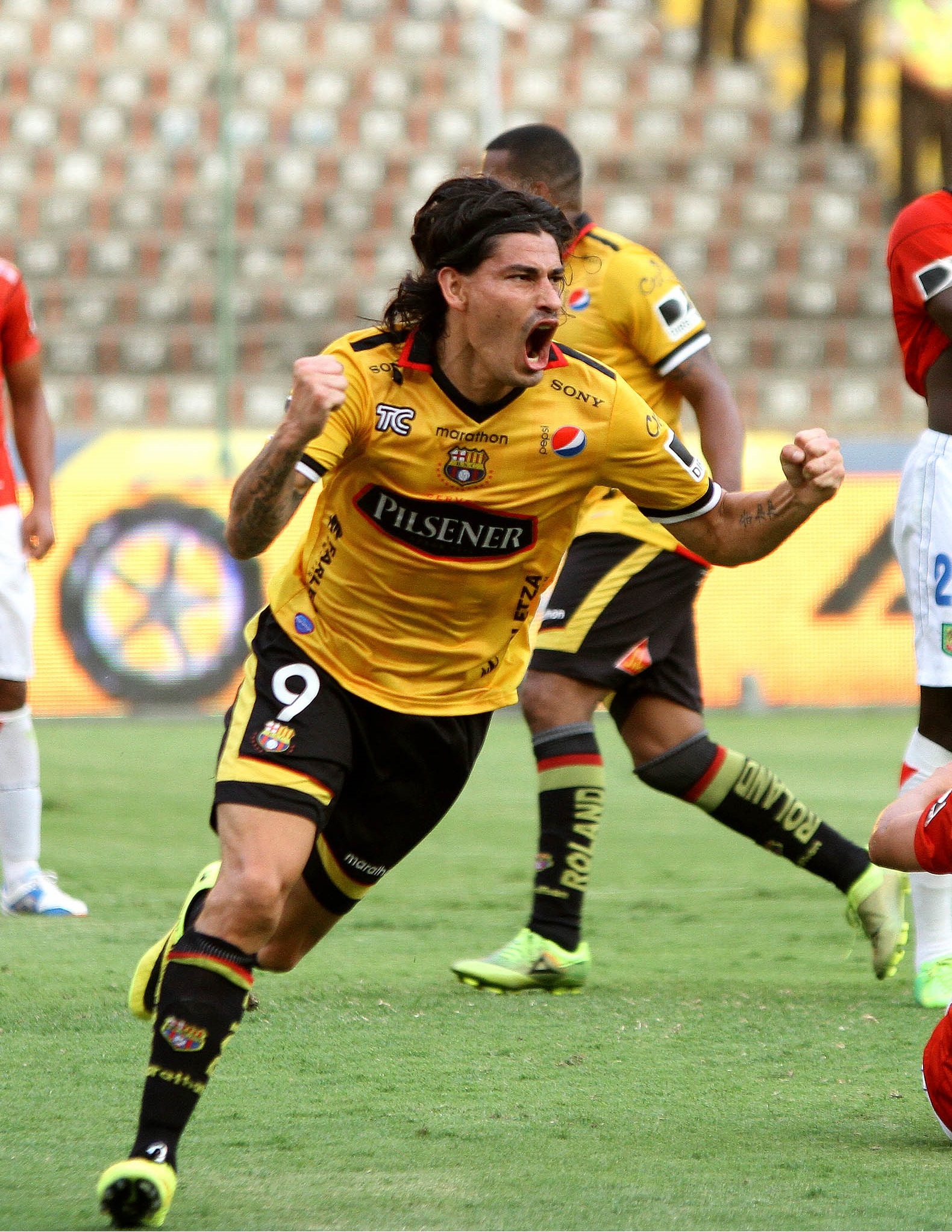
Ismael Blanco

On 12 February, AEK parted company with Lorenzo Serra Ferrer after a poor run of form and unsuccessful signings and replaced him with former player Nikos Kostenoglou, on a caretaker basis. The team initially finished in first place in the league, but after the court case between Apollon Kalamarias and Olympiacos for the illegal usage of a player in the 1–0 Apollon Kalamarias win earlier in the season, Olympiacos was awarded 3 points, thus finishing 2 points ahead of AEK.

President Demis Nikolaidis and several other managers and chairmen were angered with the court's decision, stating that the Hellenic Football Federation knew about the usage of the illegal player prior to the game and had indeed issued a registration (blue card), but didn't do anything about it. Panathinaikos also challenged the result at the Court of Arbitration in Sport (CAS) with no success, as the Hellenic Federation did not support the claim. Rivaldo had stated his intention to leave Greece if the ruling went in favour of Olympiacos and AEK were not declared champions. He stated, "A team that was not good enough to win the title on the pitch does not deserve the trophy".

Georgios Donis was appointed head footballer, born 1954of AEK on 14 May. His reign at the club did not go well. It began when AEK failed to defeat AC Omonia in the UEFA Cup second qualifying round, which meant their elimination from European competitions for the season. Rivaldo asked to leave the club to sign for Bunyodkor on 27 August.

The league campaign started very well after a win over rivals Panathinaikos in the opening game of the season, but poor performances and results from then on left AEK in a difficult situation. Manager Donis was eager to leave the club, but president Nikolaidis did not allow him to leave. Nevertheless, Nikolaidis left due to disappointing results and after a controversy with the club's supporters, Original 21, leaving the presidency temporarily to the members of the board of directors, Nikos Koulis, and Takis Kanellopoulos.

=== Financial struggle and relegation (2008–2013) ===
However, the series of disappointing results continued, bringing anger and insecure situations for everyone on the team. The first to be hit by this wave of disappointment and upset with the team council was manager Donis, who was asked to leave the team. On 21 November 2008, AEK hired Dušan Bajević as manager for third time. However, after a while, Takis Kanellopoulos left the club, as he sparked a rivalry with Bajević.

On 4 February 2009, Nikos Thanopoulos was elected as the 41st president of AEK FC. Bajević brought some much-needed stability to the club, and performances on the pitch improved vastly towards the end of the season, culminating in AEK's progression to the Greek Cup final against Olympiacos which was played on 2 May 2009, at Athens Olympic Stadium. AEK lost in the final 14–15 on penalties. AEK finished the regular season in fourth position, thus qualifying for the season's playoffs, in which they eventually finished second, just missing out on UEFA Champions League qualification.

In the summer transfer period of 2010, AEK, despite being low on budget, managed to reinforce its ranks with many notable players. Club idols Nikos Liberopoulos and Traianos Dellas signed the last one-year contracts of their careers, and many new and experienced players signed to AEK, the most notable of whom were Papa Bouba Diop, Cristian Nasuti, and Christos Patsatzoglou. AEK qualified for the 2010–11 Europa League group stage after defeating Dundee United 2–1 on aggregate.

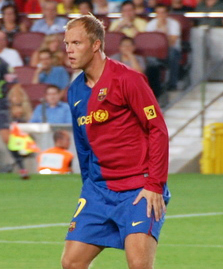
Eidur Gudjohnsen

On 7 October 2010, Manolo Jiménez agreed to a two-year deal and took over for Bajević.

On 30 April 2011, AEK won the Greek Cup for the 14th time, defeating 3–0 Atromitos at the final.

To compensate for the departures of Nacho Scocco, Papa Bouba Diop, Sebastián Saja, and Ismael Blanco in the summer of 2011, AEK signed the captain of Iceland Eiður Guðjohnsen, and Colombian international Fabián Vargas. Due to financial problems, on 25 June 2012, AEK legend Thomas Mavros took over the club's management and on 1 August 2012, became president in an effort to save the club from financial disaster. Many other former AEK players like Vasilios Tsiartas, Mimis Papaioannou, Kostas Nestoridis, Christos Kostis, Vangelis Vlachos, Christos Arvanitis, and Giorgos Karafeskos were hired to help the club return to its previous glory days. Due to bad results, on 30 September 2012, Vangelis Vlachos was fired and Ewald Lienen hired as manager. On 9 April 2013, Lienen was fired after disappointing results and AEK hired Traianos Dellas as manager with Vasilios Borbokis and Akis Zikos as assistants.

On 19 April 2013, a Super League disciplinary committee voted to remove 3 points from AEK and award Panthrakikos a 3–0 win, after fans stormed the pitch and chased players from the field during the AEK–Panthrakikos match on 14 April 2013. As a result, AEK were relegated from the Super League to the second-tier Football League for the first time in their history. In addition, AEK were to start their Football League campaign with minus 2 points.

=== Rebirth and return to titles (2013–2018) ===
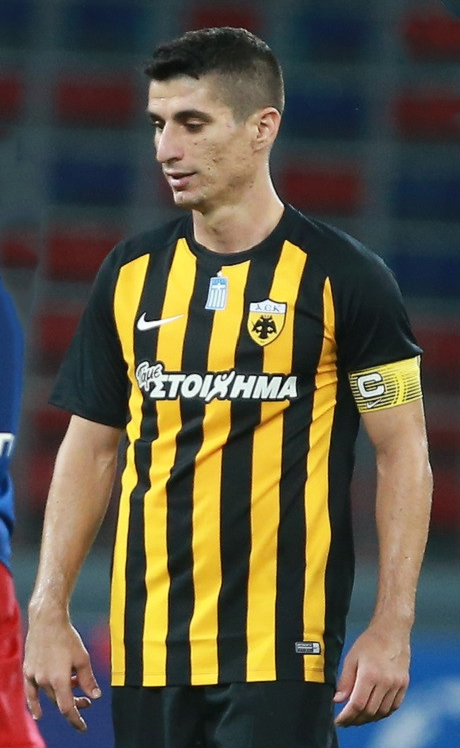
Petros Mantalos

On 7 June 2013, during an AEK council, it was decided that AEK FC would become an amateur football club and would not participate in the Football League division for the 2013–14 season, preferring instead, to self-relegate and participate in the Football League 2 division and start from scratch. On the same day Dimitris Melissanidis, the former president of the club, became administrative leader of the club, under the supervision of Amateur AEK, with the aim of saving the club. Along with other notable AEK fans and old players, they went on to create the non-profit association Independent Union of Friends of AEK (Greek: Ανεξάρτητη Ένωση Φίλων ΑΕΚ; Anexártiti Énosi Fίlon AEK) which took the majority stake of the football club.

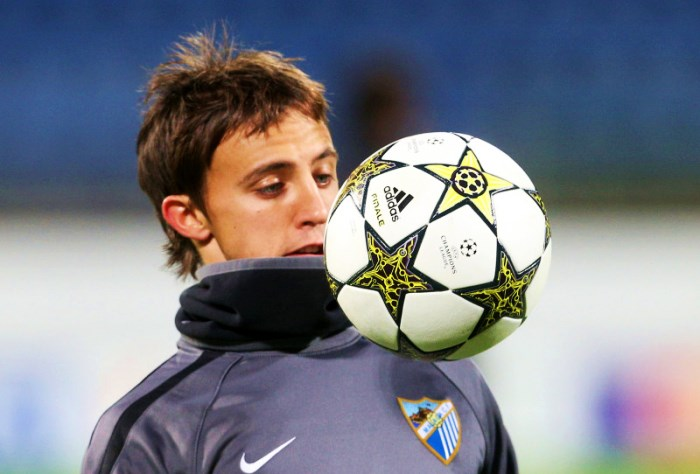
Diego Buonanotte

AEK began its revival by signing Traianos Dellas as their new manager. Dellas led AEK to first place in the third national division with a record of 23 wins, 3 draws, and only one defeat. The following year AEK participated in the 2014–15 Football League, finishing first and undefeated in the regular season standings. AEK successfully finished first in the playoffs and gained promotion back to the top tier, the Greek Super League. The club's biggest signing after returning to the Greek Super League was that of Argentinian star Diego Buonanotte, who only stayed at the club for a year.

On 20 October 2015, Traianos Dellas was forced to resign as a result of a dispute with the board, and a heavy 4–0 away loss to Olympiacos. Stelios Manolas was named interim manager and later Gus Poyet was appointed as new manager. On 19 April, Poyet was fired by AEK Athens after being accused by the board of revealing private club conversations. Stelios Manolas took charge as interim manager once again. Manolas managed to guide AEK to a 3rd-place finish in the league qualifying for the playoff round and also to their first piece of silverware since the 2010–11 season by lifting the Greek Cup, defeating Olympiacos in the final 2–1. With the postponement of the final on two separate occasions and the congested fixture list of the playoff round, AEK had to play a fixture every three days, which evidently took its toll on the players, but they finished third in the playoffs and qualified for the 2016–17 UEFA Europa League Third Qualifying Round. The first season back in the top flight was considered a success with a trophy and qualification for European football the following season, a return after a five-year hiatus.

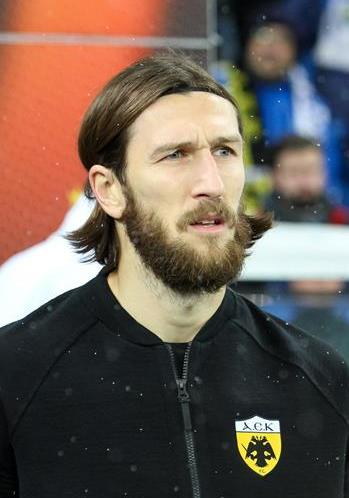
Dmytro Chyhrynskyi

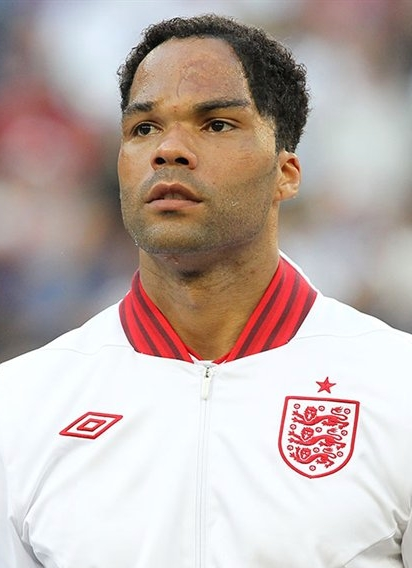
Joleon Lescott

The new season started with high expectations by AEK Athens fans as the club signed Dmytro Chyhrynskyi, Hugo Almeida and Joleon Lescott, announcing three of the biggest transfers in their history. Unfortunately, the 34-year-old English defender suffered a knee detached cartilage while cycling in his apartment. The injury ruled Lescott out for the remainder of the season. The player refused to get help from the team's doctors and insisted on completing his rehabilitation in the United Kingdom. The board did not agree to the player's wishes and additional demands, which resulted in his contract being terminated. This outcome led what it until then seemed to be a powerful defending duo to a midsummer night's nightmare. In addition, a 0–1 aggregate loss to AS Saint-Étienne in the Europa League qualifiers brought disappointment to fans' dreams of European participation. Nevertheless, AEK defeated Xanthi 4–1 in the first match of the season, raising hopes for domestic success. However, the decision was made to replace Temur Ketsbaia with José Morais; the decision was based on the team's stuttering start to the season, 3 wins, 2 draws and 2 losses, and poor displays. José's arrival, however, did not improve the team's results or performances, winning only three of his fourteen matches as manager. On 19 January 2017, former manager Manolo Jiménez was appointed as manager for the second time following José's resignation. Upon his appointment he got the team from 7th place up to a 4th-place finish, and first place in the European Playoffs, claiming second place in the league overall and qualifying for the UEFA Champions League Third qualifying round. Jiménez also guided the team to a second consecutive Greek Cup final where they faced PAOK in a controversial game marred by pre-match violence between the two sets of fans and a winning goal from an offside position.

==== UEFA Europa League unbeaten run and Greek champions ====
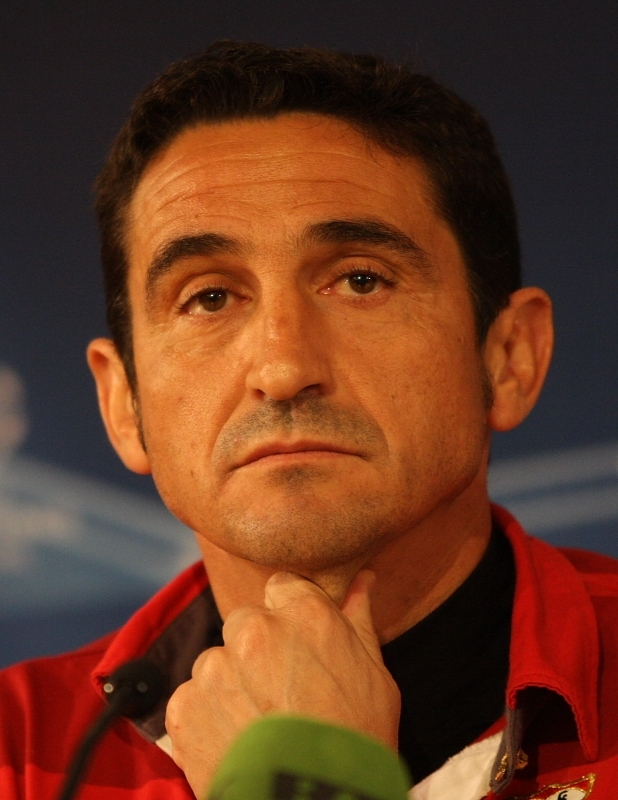
Manolo Jiménez

The third season back in the top flight began with a tough draw in the Champions League Third qualifying round versus CSKA Moscow, ending in a 3–0 aggregate loss. The defeat meant AEK were demoted to the Europa League play-off round where they were pitted against Belgians Club Brugge. A 0–0 draw in Brugge in the first leg and a 3–0 win in the return in Athens meant that AEK qualified for the group stages of a major European competition for the first time in 6 years. They were seeded in pot 4 and drawn along with AC Milan, HNK Rijeka and Austria Wien. AEK would go on to qualify for the round of 32 undefeated, a statement that solidified their return as one of Europe's elite teams, with a record of 1 win and 5 draws, the most notable being the two back-to-back 0–0 draws versus AC Milan. In the Round of 32 AEK were drawn against Ukrainian giants Dynamo Kyiv. AEK were better than their opponents, but also were unlucky and lost after two draws and on away goal rule. The first match took place in Athens, with a 1–1 draw and the second game in Kyiv, finished 0–0. In April, AEK won their 12th Greek championship, by recording a 2–0 home win against Levadiakos in front of 60,000 fans. This was their first championship after 24 years. AEK were crowned champions in front of 14,500 of their fans in the last matchday against Apollon Smyrnis at Georgios Kamaras Stadium.

==== UEFA Champions League return and consecutive Greek Cup finals ====
The 2018–19 season was the season that AEK returned to the groups of the UEFA Champions League, for the 5th time in the club's history after eliminating Celtic (3–2 on aggregate) and MOL Vidi (3–2 on aggregate) in the qualifying stages.

Led by former Panathinaikos' manager, Marinos Ouzounidis, AEK were drawn in Group E against Bayern Munich, Benfica and Ajax but failed to make an impact after losing all six matches.

Key players Jakob Johansson, Lazaros Christodoulopoulos, Sergio Araujo and Ognjen Vranješ, as well as manager Manolo Jiménez, who were essential to the triumphant 2017–18 season, left the club, and most transfers failed to improve the team. Greek international Marios Oikonomou and Argentine striker Ezequiel Ponce were the only newcomers who managed to make an impact on an overall disappointing season (3rd place, 23 points behind 1st PAOK and 18 points behind 2nd Olympiacos – third consecutive cup final loss from PAOK, 1–0).

2017–18 champions, Ognjen Vranješ and Sergio Araujo returned to Athens, and some other notable additions included Portuguese international Nélson Oliveira and Serbian midfielder Nenad Krstičić. The 2019–20 season started catastrophically, with an early Europa League elimination by the Turkish side Trabzonspor (1–3 in Athens, 0–2 in Trabzon, 3–3 on aggregate) and disappointing domestic results. New manager Miguel Cardoso was sacked quickly and replaced with the club's veteran player and manager, Nikos Kostenoglou who was also later replaced by Italian manager Massimo Carrera.

Under Carrera, AEK regained the confidence lost from the previous season and a half of bad results. Before the lockdown caused by the COVID-19 pandemic, AEK was 3rd in the regular season and in the semi-finals of the Greek Cup (2–1 home victory against Aris in the first leg). Later they would reach the final for the fifth time in a row. However, they lost 1–0 to Olympiacos.

After the draw for the Europa League third qualifying round, AEK Athens got VfL Wolfsburg at the Play-off round and won 2–1 at the Athens Olympic Stadium, securing qualification to the Group stage. However, AEK's campaign results in the Europa League as well as the first half of the domestic Super League were lackluster, the European campaign being one of their worst ever, only recording 1 win in the group stages. In December, Massimo Carrera was relieved of his duties and replaced by Manolo Jiménez, previous Super League and Greek Cup winner with AEK – his fourth term at the club.

=== Homecoming with new beginning (2022–2024) ===
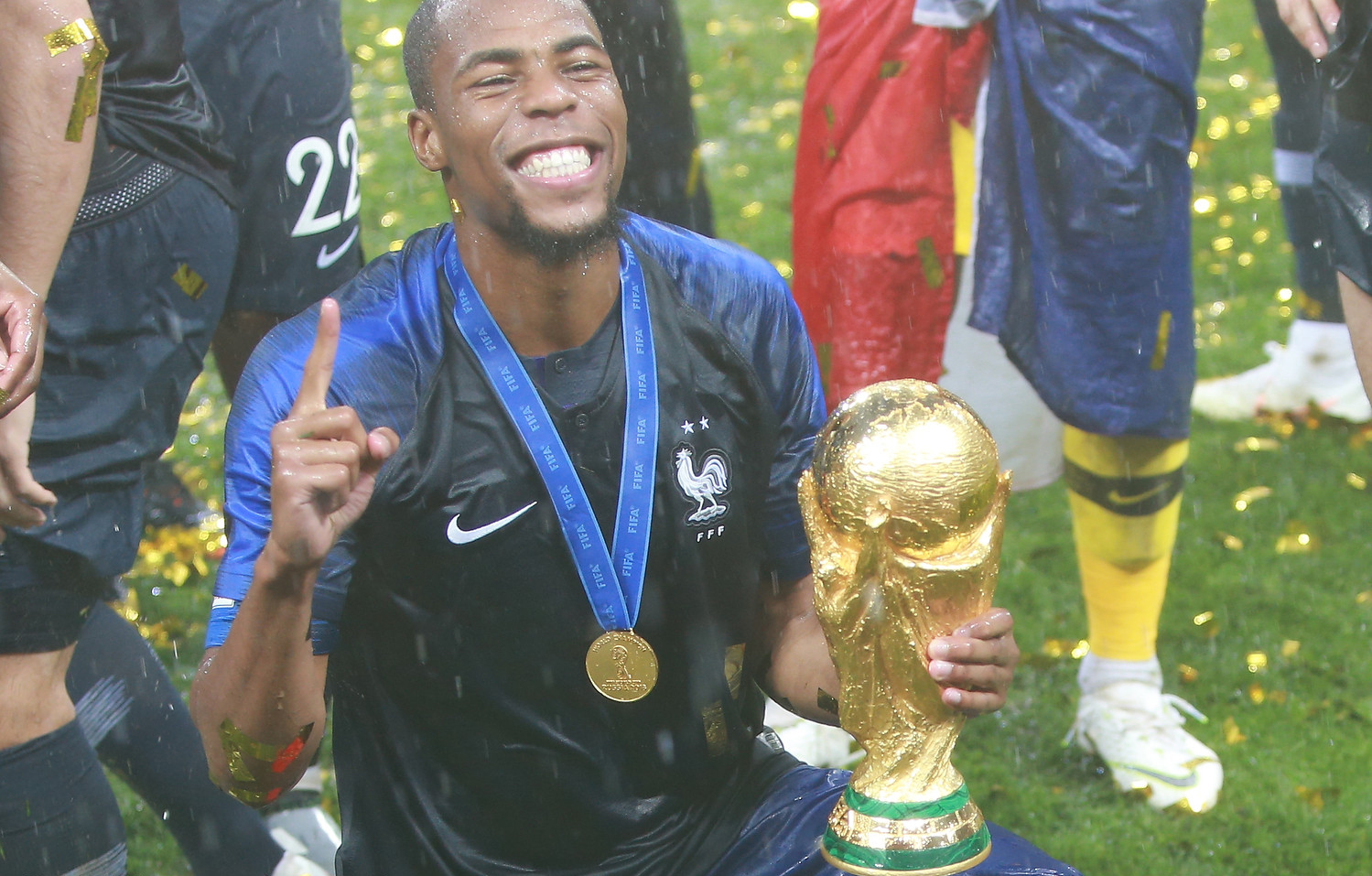
Djibril Sidibé

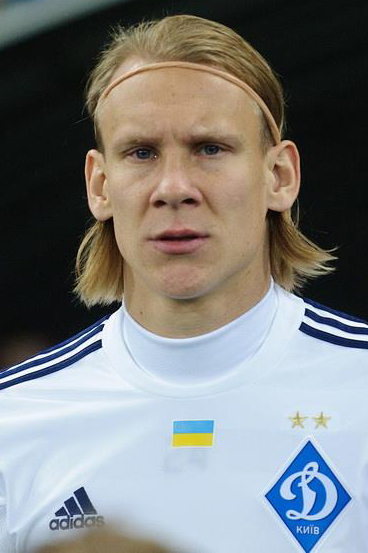
Domagoj Vida

Hoping to rebuild, AEK acquired the services of Vladan Milojević. However, his tenure ended early, with AEK Athens being disqualified on penalties by Bosnia and Herzegovina club, Velež Mostar in 2021–22 Europa Conference League second qualifying round. Barely making it to Christmas, Milojevic's head was turned by an offer from the Middle East, and AEK dismissed him. They hired the Greek manager Argiris Giannikis, who managed PAS Giannina successfully prior to his appointment. However, his time at AEK was short and once again, he was dismissed, with AEK B manager Sokratis Ofrydopoulos managing AEK through a turbulent play-off period and an exclusion from Europe. Matías Almeyda became AEK's new manager.

Ahead of the 2022–23 season and AEK's entry into Agia Sophia Stadium, AEK underwent another rebuild under the leadership of Matias Almeyda. Signed as manager towards the end of the 2021–22 season but only taking over in the 2022–23 pre-season, Almeyda played a significant part in AEK's 2022–23 success. Instilling a high-pressing, tireless, and attractive style of attacking football, he established AEK as the best team in Greece along with Panathinaikos, themselves under the leadership of Ivan Jovanovic. Despite initial losses, Almeyda gave AEK great derby victories and team cohesion. Overcoming Panathinaikos' early-season unbeaten run, being 8 points behind the league leaders, AEK were level on points with Panathinaikos in the playoff round. Notably, AEK defeated PAOK 2–0 at home, 1–0 away, Panathinaikos 1–0, Olympiacos 3–0 in the Greek Cup (reaching the final with PAOK), and 3–1 away. They also underwent a 14-game win-streak at their new stadium, the Agia Sofia or OPAP Arena stadium.

The newly built stadium is located in the place where the old Nikos Goumas Stadium was situated, at Nea Filadelfeia. The Agia Sophia Stadium, also known as OPAP Arena for sponsoring reasons, is a category 4 UEFA stadium and can host 32,500 spectators. The net construction cost is estimated around € 81,700,000. The administrative region of Attica funded the stadium with the amount of € 20,000,000. The stadium's opening ceremony took place on 30 September 2022. AEK Athens beat Ionikos 4–1 in the inaugural match on 3 October 2022, which was the sixth fixture of the 2022–23 Greek Super League.

In the summer transfer window of the 2022–23 season, AEK Athens announced the signing of two famous football players who played as opponents in the 2018 FIFA World Cup final in Russia. The first player was the Croatian center-back Domagoj Vida who previously played for Süper Lig side Beşiktaş, and the second player was the French right-back Djibril Sidibé, most recently of Ligue 1 club Monaco. The latter was the most valuable player to have ever arrived at the club with a market value of € 8,000,000, surpassing the previous record holder Juanfran by € 2,000,000. Sidibé is also the fifth World Cup winner to play in the Greek Super League, after Frenchman Christian Karembeu and Brazilian players Rivaldo, Gilberto Silva and Denilson.

AEK Athens were crowned champions on 14 May 2023, after beating Volos 4–0 to seal the title, 5 points ahead of second place Panathinaikos. AEK Athens thus won their 13th championship and the first in Nea Filadelfeia since 1994. On 25 May 2023, AEK Athens defeated PAOK 2–0 in the 2022–23 Greek Cup final to win the title and seal the double for the first time since 1978. The following season, AEK Athens went head-to-head throughout the whole season against PAOK, and ended up losing a potential second consecutive title, on the final game of the season, staying two points behind the first place. They lost in the Round of 16 of the Greek Cup against Aris on penalties, and were eliminated in the group stage of the UEFA Europa League, against AFC Ajax, Brighton & Hove Albion and Olympique de Marseille.

=== The Marios Iliopoulos era (2024–present) ===
Following an ultimately disappointing season for AEK and a missed chance to win a second consecutive league title, major shareholder and owner Dimitris Melissanidis announced his departure from the club's ownership on June 10, 2024, selling his shares to Seajets owner, Marios Iliopoulos for a seeming €90 million. At his final interview, Melissanidis stated that he "had completed his part and brought AEK back to the top, with a new stadium, a competitive team in Greek and European football, and zero debt".

At an Iliopoulos presentation, he stated he wanted a competitive team that will dominate Greek football and become a significant European power, while also focusing on the one thing AEK was lacking in, their academies. On a question regarding an increase on the transfer budget and a change on the current transfer policy, he urged AEK fans to "put on their seatbelts slowly and enjoy it". Not long after, Iliopoulos sold Ezequiel Ponce for a club record €9,000,000, while signing players such as Roberto Pereyra, Erik Lamela and Thomas Strakosha with club record contract fees.

The season, however, started with an early elimination of AEK from the Conference Cup by FC Noah.

On 19 September 2024, the club announced ex Manchester United player, Anthony Martial, on a three-year deal. This is the club's highest valued player arrival, with an estimate of €10m. In October 2024 they announced the signing of Javier Ribalta as their new Executive Director.

In the 2024–25 Super League, AEK finished fourth resulting in the announcement of manager Matías Almeyda's departure after the end of the season.

In June 2025, AEK announced their new manager, Marko Nikolić. They proceeded in signings such as Filipe Relvas, Marko Grujić, Răzvan Marin, Luka Jović. Under Nikolić they managed to qualify in the League phase of the Conference League for their first time in their history. There, they finished at the third place of the standings and advanced to the round of 16. They achieved their greatest campaign in the institution by reaching its quarter-finals, where they were eliminated by the eventual finalists, Rayo Vallecano. A month later, in May 2026, AEK won the Championship, their 14th title and the first title of the Iliopoulos ownership.

== Crest ==
Palaiologos dynasty and Byzantium emblem

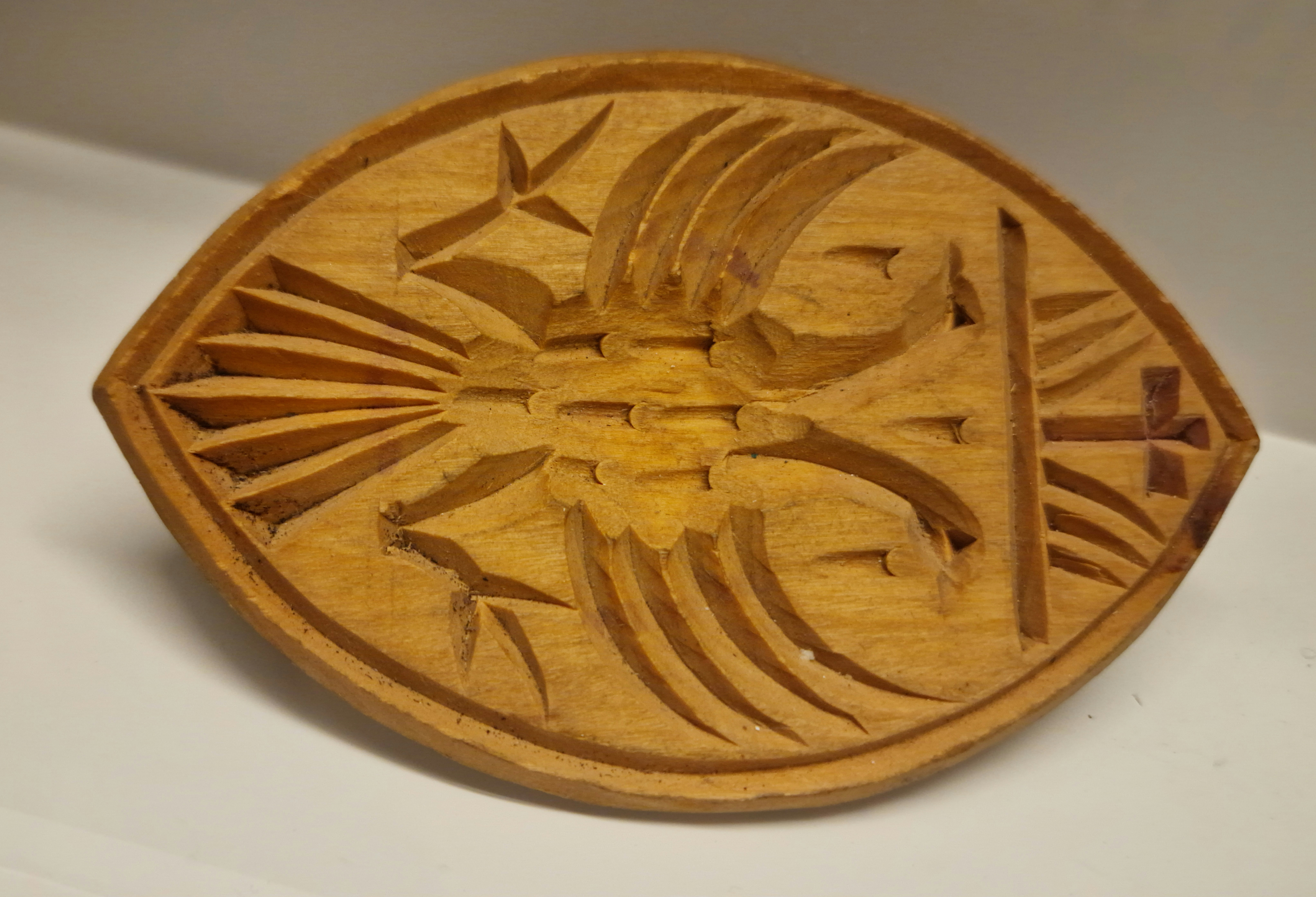
Household item of a Greek refugee from Asia Minor from the National Historical Museum, Athens

In 1924, AEK adopted the image of a double-headed eagle (Δικέφαλος Αετός; Dikéfalos Aetós) as their emblem. Created by Greek refugees from Constantinople in the years following the Greco-Turkish War and subsequent population exchange, the emblem and colours (yellow and black) of AEK were chosen as a reminder of lost homelands; they represent the club's historical ties to Constantinople. The double-headed eagle is featured in the flag of the various entities of the Greek Orthodox Church, whose headquarters are in Constantinople, and served as Imperial emblem under the Palaiologos dynasty, which was the last one to rule the Byzantine Empire.

AEK's main emblem underwent numerous minor changes between 1924 and 1982. The design of the eagle on the shirt badge was often not identical to the design of the eagle depicted on official club correspondence, merchandise, and promotional material. All designs were considered "official" (in the broadest sense of the word), however, it was not until 1982 that an identifiable, copyrighted design was established as the club's official, and shirt badge. The emblem design was changed in 1989, again in 1993, and again in 2013 to the current design.

== Anthem of AEK ==
AEK's club anthem, Embrós tis AEK Palikária (Advance AEK's Lads), was composed by Stelios Kazantzidis. The lyrics were written by Christos Kolokotronis. The most popular version of the anthem is sung by the former footballer, Mimis Papaioannou.

Greek

ΑΕΚ-ΑΕΚ-ΑΕΚ!

Αναστενάζουν τα γκολπόστ
και τα δοκάρια σπάζουν
της Ένωσης οι αετοί
τα δίχτυα κομματιάζουν

Εμπρός της ΑΕΚ παλικάρια
σουτάρετε και σπάστε τα δοκάρια
τα δίχτυα σκίστε, την δόξα κατακτήστε
νικήστε-νικήστε-νικήστε!
Τα δίχτυα σκίστε, την δόξα κατακτήστε,
νικήστε-νικήστε-νικήστε!

ΑΕΚ-ΑΕΚ-ΑΕΚ!

Οι κυνηγοί σου κεραυνοί
βράχος η άμυνά σου
και της Ρεάλ το φόβητρο
έγινε τ’ όνομά σου

Εμπρός της ΑΕΚ παλικάρια
σουτάρετε και σπάστε τα δοκάρια
τα δίχτυα σκίστε, την δόξα κατακτήστε
νικήστε-νικήστε-νικήστε
Τα δίχτυα σκίστε, την δόξα κατακτήστε
νικήστε-νικήστε-νικήστε!

English

AEK-AEK-AEK!

The goalposts are sighing
and the posts are breaking
the eagles of the Union
are shattering the nets

Let's go AEK's lads
Shoot the ball and break the posts
Tear the nets, conquer the glory
Win-win-win!
Tear the nets, conquer the glory
Win-win-win!

AEK-AEK-AEK!

Your hunters are lightning
your defense is rock
and the terror of Real Madrid
your name has become

Let's go AEK's lads
Shoot the ball and break the posts
Tear the nets, conquer the glory
Win-win-win!
Tear the nets, conquer the glory
Win-win-win!

== Kit and colours ==
The colours of yellow/gold and black were adopted due to AEK's connections with Constantinople and the Byzantine Empire.

AEK have almost always worn predominantly gold or yellow shirts and black shorts. An exception was the unusual but popular Kappa kits of the 1990s, which featured a large two-headed eagle motif across the kit.

AEK's traditional away colours are all-black or all-white; on a few occasions, the club has worn a third kit of light blue, silver, dark red, or Tyrian purple (porphyra, a type of reddish purple), inspired by the use of the colour on the Byzantine war flag and by Byzantine imperial dynasties.

== Shirt sponsors and manufacturers ==
Since 1 June 2021, AEK's kit has been manufactured by Nike. Previous manufacturers have been Adidas (1974–75, 1977–83 and 2005–07), Zita Hellas (1983–89), Diadora (1989–93), Basic (1993–95), Kappa (1995–2000), Puma (1975–77 and 2007–15) and Capelli (2018–21).

Starting in 2015, the club's main shirt sponsors are OPAP, which also sponsored them in 2010–14. Previous shirt sponsors have been Citizen (1982–83), Nissan (1983–85), Ethniki Asfalistiki (1985–93 and 1995–96), Phoenix Asfaleies (1993–95), Geniki Bank (1996–98), Firestone (1999), Marfin Investment Group (1999–2001), Alpha Digital (2001–02), Piraeus Bank (2002–04), TIM (2004–06), LG (2006–08), Diners Club (2009–10), and Jeep (2014–15).

Main shirt sponsors for 2026 Pame Stoixima, Cosmote TV, Seajets, Nike, Piraeus Bank.

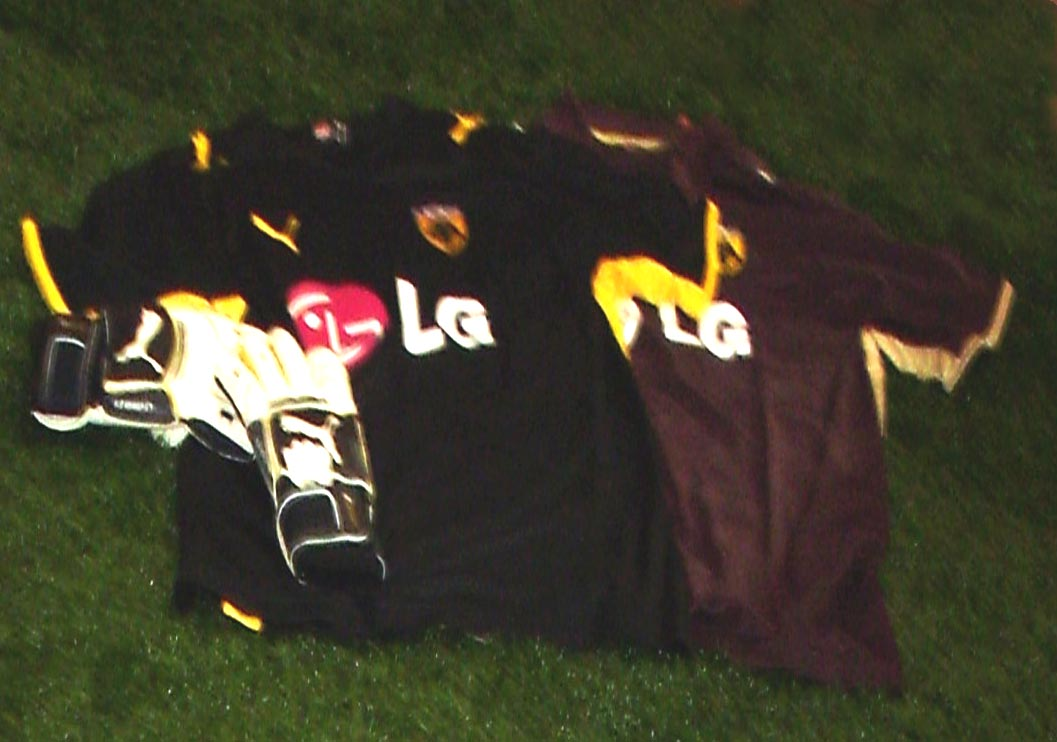
Alternative AEK shirts (2008–09)

Period	Kit manufacturer	Shirt sponsor
1974–1975	Adidas	—
1975–1976	Puma	—
1976–1982	Adidas	—
1982–1983	Adidas	Citizen
1983–1985	Zita Hellas	Nissan
1985–1989	Zita Hellas	Ethniki Asfalistiki
1989–1993	Diadora	Ethniki Asfalistiki
1993–1995	Basic	Phoenix Asfaleies
1995	Kappa	Ethniki Asfalistiki
1995	Diadora	—
1995–1996	Kappa	Ethniki Asfalistiki
1996–1998	Kappa	General Bank of Greece
1999	Kappa	Firestone
1999–2000	Kappa	Marfin Investment Group
2000–2001	Nike	Marfin Investment Group
2001–2002	Nike	Alpha Digital
2002–2004	Nike	Piraeus Bank
2004	Nike	TIM
2005–2006	Adidas	TIM
2006–2007	Adidas	LG
2007–2009	Puma	LG
2009–2010	Puma	Diners Club
2010–2013	Puma	Kino
2013–2014	Puma	Tzoker
2014–2015	Puma	Jeep
2015–2018	Nike	Pame Stoixima
2018–2021	Capelli	Pame Stoixima
2021–	Nike	Pame Stoixima

== Financial information ==
Loukas Barlos, a successful bauxite Mine Owner, was also owner and president since 1974, and was in charge when Greek football turned professional in 1979. In 1981, due to health problems, he passed his shares to Andreas Zafiropoulos. In 1982 the business shipping magnate Michalis Arkadis became president, aiming to reinforce financial support, with Zafiropoulos holding the majority stake. In 1988, Zafiropoulos placed Stratos Gidopoulos in the presidency, and AEK managed to win their first championship in ten years.

On 17 June 1992, the club passed to new owners. The business shipping magnate and oil tycoon Dimitris Melissanidis, together with Giannis Karras, took the majority stake and continued the successful and champion seasons.

After an unsuccessful season, in 1995, they passed their shares to Michalis Trochanas, and with his turn a percentage to ENIC Group investment company. In 1999, NETMED, a Dutch media company, took over the management of the club. A crisis period followed with mismanagement and many changes in the presidency. In 2004, ex-AEK player Demis Nikolaidis made a plan to progress with the reorganization and financial consolidation, and together with other investors (such as Nicholas X. Notias, Gikas Goumas, Takis Kanellopoulos, a shareholder of Titan Cement, and others) took the majority stake.

The plan initially seemed to work, but the downfall continued. The team was relegated after the 2012–13 season for the first time in its history. In an effort to discharge the immense debt created by years of mismanagement, its directors chose for the team to compete in the third tier. On the same day Dimitris Melissanidis, the old president of the club, became the administrative leader of AEK, under the supervision of the amateur AEK Later, together with other notable AEK fans and old players, they created the non-profit association "Union Friends of AEK" (Enosi Filon AEK) which took the majority stake of the football club.

In March 2015, AEK FC became the first Greek company that is listed in the Elite programme of the London Stock Exchange, a pan-European programme for ambitious high-growth businesses that was launched in 2012 at Borsa Italiana and following its success was rolled out in the UK in 2014, and the first Greek football club quoted on a stock exchange. Raffaele Jerusalmi, executive director of the board of directors of LSEG, stated: "We are delighted to welcome AEK to the Elite programme". On 27 April 2015, AEK FC was selected for the honor of opening a session of the London Stock Exchange.

Current sponsorships:

- Premium Sponsors: Pame Stoixima, Nike
- Official Sponsors: Football Pro, Piraeus Bank, Cosmote, Cosmote TV, LG Corporation, AVIS, Seajets

== Stadium ==
Nikos Goumas Stadium was a multi-purpose stadium in Nea Filadelfeia ("New Philadelphia"), a northwestern suburb of Athens, Greece. It was used mostly for football matches and was the home stadium of AEK Athens. It was named after one-time club president, Nicholas Goumas, who contributed to its building and later upgrading. It served as AEK's home ground since 1930. The Nikos Goumas Stadium had severe damages from 1999's earthquake and in 2003 was demolished with the prospect to build a new stadium for AEK FC. Unfortunately, prolonged obstruction, legal issues, and tight deadlines caused multiple delays to the project.

In 2004 the club moved to the 70,000-capacity "Spyros Louis" (Athens Olympic Stadium) in Athens. The Olympic Athletic Center of Athens, also known as OAKA, is one of the most complete European athletic complexes. It has hosted the 1991 Mediterranean Games, the 1997 World Championships in Athletics, the 1994 and 2007 UEFA Champions League Finals, as well as other important athletic and cultural events, the most significant of which remains the 2004 Summer Olympics.

Construction of an all-new purpose-built stadium initially began on 28 July 2017 in the site of the old Nikos Goumas stadium. It suffered from major delays due to the local authorities taking too long on confirming certain proposals concerning the stadium's road system. Construction was completed in 2022. The stadium has capacity of approximately 32,500 fans and features a unique underground road system that the teams use to enter the stadium.

Agia Sophia Stadium features The Museum of Refugee Hellenism of AEK Athens. It is open daily from Tuesday to Sunday (10:00-18.00).

The stadium's opening ceremony took place on 30 September 2022. AEK Athens won Ionikos 4–1 in their new stadium opening game on 3 October 2022, a game conducted for the sixth fixture of the 2022–23 Super League.

Stadium	Capacity	Years
Nikos Goumas Stadium	27,729	1928–1985 and 1987–2003
Athens Olympic Stadium	69,618	1985–1987 and 2004–2022
Agia Sophia Stadium	32,500	2022–

=== Training facility ===
Since December 2010, AEK has been using state-of-the-art facilities in an area of 144 acres in the Mazareko area in Spata. Previously owned by Nicholas X. Notias, it is the most expensive (with a total cost around €25m) and one of the biggest training centers in Greece. These facilities include two lawns with natural turf and one with plastic for the needs of the Academies (which was created in 2013 with a viewing platform for spectators) and all the necessary and well-equipped areas for the preparation of a team with modern instruments. A standard football studio, one of the most complete in Greece. The main building of the centre hosts the offices of the club, a press room, and the players' rooms. The training ground is used by the first team and youth teams. The Spata Training Centre includes state-of-the-art facilities, a fitness and health centre with weight-training and fitness rooms, a cryotherapy centre, and more. There are also plans for an AEK Museum, hotel, aquatic centre, and two more soccer fields. From 2013 on, AEK training centre services have been upgraded dramatically. The players of the teamwork daily in an environment with all the necessary infrastructure, while in the last few months, they have at their disposal in the basement of the building a treatment centre with the most modern means. Even the young athletes of the Academies work in facilities that very few Academies have in Greece. But the outlook is even more impressive. Since 2014, the official name of the ground is "OPAP Sports Centre". On 4 July 2018, the Sports Centre came to auction which was bought by Dimitrios Melissanidis for a price of €3.5m and then donated it to AEK. Alongside the Sports Centre, Melissanidis also bought 70 hectares for an extra €5.5m which were added to the wider area of the existing training center and there will be additional stadiums along with the necessary additional facilities for the preparation of the team and for the hospitality of the players.

== Supporters, rivalries, and affiliations ==
=== Support ===
AEK Athens has a large fans' base across all over Greece and is one of the two most popular Greek clubs in relation to their fans' base. According to Sky Sports, AEK have around 30% of all Greek football fans. AEK's fan base in Greece is believed to be over 1 million with various types of research. AEK Athens traditional fanbase comes from the area of Athens, where the club is based.

AEK has a strong support of fans in Greek diaspora especially in Cyprus where the club has a large following with a recent fan poll having AEK as the most popular Greek-supported team in Cyprus, having about 35% of Cypriot football fans supporting the club. One of the main reasons for AEK's popularity in Cyprus, ahead of Olympiacos (the most popular Greek team in Greece), is due to the fact AEK are a refugees' club, and many Greek Cypriots were made refugees after the Turkish invasion of Cyprus. AEK has also a strong following in Australia, the US, the UK, Germany and France. The most hardcore supporters of AEK are Original 21, which is the largest group fan organisation of the club and is known for its loyal and passionate support.

=== Supporters friendships ===
A so-called "triangle of brotherhood" has developed between the largest fan clubs of AEK (Original 21), Marseille (Ultras) and Livorno. The connection is mostly an ideological one. AEK's and St. Pauli's left-wing fans have a strong friendship, and their connection is also mostly for ideological reasons. There is an informal friendship and fraternization between the supporters of AEK and Fenerbahçe. In the 2017 Euroleague final, Fenerbahçe S.K. supporters displayed a banner that read "Same City's Sons" There is also a friendship and cooperation between AEK fans club of Piraeus and Chelsea fans club of Athens (including Chelsea supporters club of South Africa).

=== Rivalries ===
AEK Athens' biggest rivalries are with Panathinaikos and Olympiacos. Against their city neighbours Panathinaikos, they contest the Athens local football derby. The rivalry started not only because of both competing for the major titles, but also because of the refugee ancestry of a big part of AEK fans and, by contrast, that Panathinaikos was considered in general the representative of the Athenian high-class society.

The rivalry with Piraeus based club Olympiacos stems from the rivalry between two of the most successful Greek football clubs. The rivalry was particularly inflamed after 1996, when AEK's former star player and then-manager Dušan Bajević moved to Olympiacos, and most recently after the controversial 2007–08 Super League which was awarded to Olympiacos.

=== Affiliated clubs ===
- (Mexico) Atlético Morelia
- (Germany) BV Weckhoven

== Honours ==
AEK Athens F.C. honours aekfc.gr
Type	Competition	Titles	Seasons
Domestic	Super League Greece	14	1938–39, 1939–40, 1962–63, 1967–68, 1970–71, 1977–78, 1978–79, 1988–89, 1991–92, 1992–93, 1993–94, 2017–18, 2022–23, 2025–26
Domestic	Super League Greece 2	1	2014–15
Domestic	Gamma Ethniki	1	2013–14
Domestic	Greek Football Cup	16	1931–32, 1938–39, 1948–49, 1949–50, 1955–56, 1963–64, 1965–66, 1977–78, 1982–83, 1995–96, 1996–97, 1999–2000, 2001–02, 2010–11, 2015–16, 2022–23
Domestic	Greek League Cup	1	1990
Domestic	Greek Super Cup	2	1989, 1996
Regional	Athens FCA First Division	5	1939–40, 1942–43, 1945–46, 1946–47, 1949–50

- record
- ^{S} Shared record

=== Doubles ===
- Winners (3): 1938–39, 1977–78, 2022–23

=== European competitions ===
- European Cup/UEFA Champions League
  - Quarter-finals (1): 1968–69
- UEFA Cup/UEFA Europa League
  - Semi-finals (1): 1976–77
- UEFA Conference League
  - Quarter-finals (1): 2025–26
- UEFA Cup Winners' Cup
  - Quarter-finals (2): 1996–97, 1997–98
- Balkans Cup
  - Runners-up (1): 1966–67

=== Unofficial titles ===
==== Regional tournaments ====
Competition	Titles	Seasons	Runners-up	Ref.
Easter Cup	4	1938, 1944, 1955, 1958		
Christmas Cup	3	1944, 1947, 1957		
Pre-Mediterranean Cup	1	1991		
Athletic Echo Cup	1	1963		
Supercup	1	1971		

==== International tournaments ====
Competition	Titles	Seasons	Runners-up	Ref.
Nova Supersports Cup	1^{s}	1999	2000, 2001	
Sydney Festival of Football	1	2010		

- Record
- ^{S} Shared record

Source: AEK Athens F.C.

== European performance ==
Best seasons

Season	Manager	Round	Eliminated by	Results
Champions League / European Cup
1968–69	(Socialist Federal Republic of Yugoslavia) Branko Stanković	Quarter-finals	(Czechoslovakia) Spartak Trnava	1–2 in Trnava, 1–1 in Nea Filadelfeia
1978–79	(Hungary) Ferenc Puskás	Round of 16	(England) Nottingham Forest	1–2 in Nea Filadelfeia, 1–5 in West Bridgford
1989–90	(Socialist Federal Republic of Yugoslavia) Dušan Bajević	Round of 16	(France) Marseille	0–2 in Marseille, 1–1 in Nea Filadelfeia
1992–93	(Bosnia and Herzegovina) Dušan Bajević	Round of 16	(Netherlands) PSV	1–0 in Nea Filadelfeia, 0–3 in Eindhoven
1994–95	(Bosnia and Herzegovina) Dušan Bajević	Round of 16	(Italy) Milan	0–0 in Nea Filadelfeia, 1–2 in Trieste
Cup Winners' Cup
1995–96	(Bosnia and Herzegovina) Dušan Bajević	Round of 16	(Germany) Borussia M'gladbach	1–4 in Mönchengladbach, 0–1 in Nea Filadelfeia
1996–97	(Greece) Petros Ravousis	Quarter-finals	(France) Paris Saint-Germain	0–0 in Paris, 0–3 in Nea Filadelfeia
1997–98	(Romania) Dumitru Dumitriu	Quarter-finals	(Russia) Lokomotiv Moscow	0–0 in Nea Filadelfeia, 1–2 in Moscow
Europa League / UEFA Cup
1976–77	(Czechoslovakia) František Fadrhonc	Semi-finals	(Italy) Juventus	1–4 in Turin, 0–1 in Nea Filadelfeia
1991–92	(Bosnia and Herzegovina) Dušan Bajević	Round of 16	(Italy) Torino	2–2 in Nea Filadelfeia, 0–1 in Turin
2000–01	(North Macedonia) Toni Savevski	Round of 16	(Spain) Barcelona	0–1 in Nea Filadelfeia, 0–5 in Barcelona
2001–02	(Portugal) Fernando Santos	Round of 16	(Italy) Internazionale	1–3 in Milan, 2–2 in Nea Filadelfeia
2002–03	(Bosnia and Herzegovina) Dušan Bajević	Round of 16	(Spain) Málaga	0–0 in Málaga, 0–1 in Nea Filadelfeia
2006–07	(Spain) Lorenzo Serra Ferrer	Round of 32	(France) Paris Saint-Germain	0–2 in Paris, 0–2 in Marousi
2007–08	(Greece) Nikos Kostenoglou	Round of 32	(Spain) Getafe	1–1 in Marousi, 0–3 in Getafe
2017–18	(Spain) Manolo Jiménez	Round of 32	(Ukraine) Dynamo Kyiv	1–1 in Marousi, 0–0 in Kyiv
Conference League
2025–26	(Serbia) Marko Nikolić	Quarter-finals	(Spain) Rayo Vallecano	3–0 in Madrid, 3–1 in Nea Filadelfeia
Balkans Cup
1966–67	(Greece) Tryfon Tzanetis	Runners-up	(Turkey) Fenerbahçe	2–1 in Nea Filadelfeia, 0–1 and 1–3 in Istanbul

=== UEFA and IFFHS rankings ===
As of 8 September 2026

UEFA Club Ranking

Rank	Country	Team	Points
64	(Serbia)	Red Star Belgrade	31.500
65	(Italy)	Bologna	30.750
66	(Greece)	AEK Athens	30.500
67	(England)	Newcastle United	29.750
68	(Greece)	Panathinaikos	29.250

As of 31 July 2026

IFFHS Club World Ranking

Rank	Country	Team	Points
119	(Poland)	Raków Częstochowa	141.25
120	(Japan)	Sanfrecce Hiroshima	141
121	(Greece)	AEK Athens	139.5
122	(Cyprus)	Omonia	139
123	(Chile)	Universidad de Chile	138.25

== Players ==
=== Current squad ===
As of 2 September 2026

Note: Flags indicate national team as defined under FIFA eligibility rules; some limited exceptions apply. Players may hold more than one non-FIFA nationality.

No.	Pos.	Nation	Player
1	GK	ALB	Thomas Strakosha
2	DF	CMR	Harold Moukoudi (third-captain)
3	DF	ALB	Stavros Pilios
5	DF	GRE	Christos Alexiou (on loan from Inter Milan U23)
6	MF	FIN	Kaan Kairinen
7	MF	SUI	Dereck Kutesa
8	MF	SRB	Mijat Gaćinović
9	FW	SRB	Luka Jović
10	MF	UKR	Oleksandr Zubkov
11	FW	MTN	Aboubakary Koïta
12	DF	GRE	Lazaros Rota
14	MF	CRO	Lovro Majer
15	DF	BUL	Martin Georgiev
16	MF	HON	Kervin Arriaga

No.	Pos.	Nation	Player
17	MF	GRE	Dimitris Kaloskamis
18	MF	ROU	Răzvan Marin
19	FW	HUN	Barnabás Varga
20	MF	GRE	Petros Mantalos (captain)
21	DF	CRO	Domagoj Vida (vice-captain)
22	DF	GRE	Charalampos Lykogiannis
23	MF	POR	João Mário
27	MF	HUN	Milán Vitális
39	FW	GRE	Zois Karargyris
41	GK	GRE	Marios Balamotis
44	DF	POR	Filipe Relvas
80	MF	RWA	Hakim Sahabo
90	FW	ANG	Zini
91	GK	ITA	Alberto Brignoli

=== Other players under contract ===
Note: Flags indicate national team as defined under FIFA eligibility rules; some limited exceptions apply. Players may hold more than one non-FIFA nationality.

No.	Pos.	Nation	Player
—	FW	HAI	Frantzdy Pierrot

=== Out on loan ===
Note: Flags indicate national team as defined under FIFA eligibility rules; some limited exceptions apply. Players may hold more than one non-FIFA nationality.

No.	Pos.	Nation	Player
—	GK	GRE	Angelos Angelopoulos (at Athens Kallithea until 30 June 2027)
—	DF	SCO	James Penrice (at Rangers until 30 June 2027)
—	MF	CRO	Robert Ljubičić (at LASK until 30 June 2027)
—	MF	SWE	Niclas Eliasson (at Internacional until 30 June 2027)

No.	Pos.	Nation	Player
—	MF	ESP	Paolo Fernandes (at Alanyaspor until 30 June 2027)
—	FW	ARG	Elián Sosa (at Anorthosis Famagusta until 30 June 2027)
—	FW	GRE	Vasilios Kontonikos (at Athens Kallithea until 30 June 2027)

== Statistics and records ==
=== Domestic and European records ===
Outline	Domestic records
Least goals conceded in a Greek Championship season	12 (2017–18)
Consecutive knock-out qualifications in Greek Cup	15 (2015–16, 2016–17, 2017–18, 2018–19, 2019–20)
Biggest win in a Greek Cup final	7–1 (vs Apollon Smyrnis, 1995–96)
Biggest away victory in Greek Championship	0–8 (vs Egaleo, 1961–62)

Outline	European national records
Consecutive unbeaten matches in the group stage of the UEFA Champions League	6 (vs Real Madrid, Roma and Genk, 2002–03)
Consecutive participation in the Round of 16 phases of a European competition	4 (1994–95, 1995–96, 1996–97 and 1997–98)
Consecutive games without a loss in any European competition	14 (vs Club Brugge, Milan, Rijeka, Austria Wien, Dynamo Kyiv, Celtic and MOL Vidi, 2017–18 and 2018–19)

Outline	International records
Consecutive draws in the group stage of the UEFA Champions League	6 (vs Real Madrid, Roma and Genk, 2002–03)

=== One-club men ===
Player	Position	Debut	Last match
(Greece) Ilias Iliaskos	FW	1927	1933
(Greece) Christos Ribas	GK	1929	1947
(Greece) Tryfon Tzanetis	FW	1933	1950
(Greece) Georgios Magiras	MF	1933	1949
(Greece) Kleanthis Maropoulos	FW	1934	1952
(Greece) Michalis Delavinias	GK	1938	1955
(Greece) Michalis Papatheodorou	MF	1944	1956
(Greece) Antonis Parayios	DF	1948	1957
(Greece) Andreas Stamatiadis	FW	1950	1969
(Greece) Stelios Serafidis	GK	1953	1972
(Greece) Spyros Ikonomopoulos	GK	1977	1996
(Greece) Stelios Manolas	DF	1979	1998

=== Super League top scorers ===
AEK has a tradition in strikers and goal-scoring players. 14 different teams' players, 24 times overall, have finished the season as the top scorer in the Super League.

Rank	Player	Times	Season(s)
1	(Greece) Kostas Nestoridis	5 (domestic record)	1959–1963
2	(Greece) Thomas Mavros	3	1978, 1979, 1985
3	(Greece) Vasilis Dimitriadis	2	1992, 1993
4	(Greece) Mimis Papaioannou	2	1964, 1966
5	(Argentina) Ismael Blanco	2	2008, 2009
6	(Greece) Kleanthis Maropoulos	2	1939, 1940
7	(Greece) Alexis Alexandris	1	1994
8	(Greece) Nikos Liberopoulos	1	2007
9	(Cyprus) Kostas Vasiliou	1	1939
10	(Greece) Georgios Dedes	1	1976
11	(Greece) Demis Nikolaidis	1	1999
12	(Greece) Vasilios Tsiartas	1	1996
13	(Bosnia and Herzegovina) Dušan Bajević	1	1980
14	(Denmark) Henrik Nielsen	1	1988

=== Player records ===
- Most club appearances: 593–Stelios Manolas
- Most club goals: 299–Mimis Papaioannou

=== Manager records ===
- Most club titles: 8–Dušan Bajević

== Contribution to the Greece national team ==
AEK, through their history, have highlighted some of the greatest Greek players in the history of Greek football, who also contributed to the national team (Papaioannou, Nestoridis, Mavros, Tsiartas, Nikolaidis, etc.).

Five players of the club were part of the golden team of 2004 that won the UEFA Euro 2004:

- UEFA Euro 2004 (6): Thodoris Zagorakis (player of the tournament), Vasilios Tsiartas, Michalis Kapsis, Kostas Katsouranis, Demis Nikolaidis and Vasilios Lakis.

A total of 113 players of AEK had played for the Greece national football team up to 16 November 2026.

=== Player list ===
N.	Name	Pos.	Years	Apps	Goals
1	Alexis Alexandris	FW	1991–1994	9	0
2	Georgios Alexopoulos	DF	2005	3	0
3	Mimis Anastasiadis	DF	1960	3	0
4	Christos Aravidis	FW	2014–2017	5	1
5	Youlielmos Arvanitis	DF	1948–1952	5	0
6	Christos Ardizoglou	FW	1975–1984	43	2
7	Georgios Athanasiadis	GK	2024	1	0
8	Ilias Atmatsidis	GK	1994–1999	47	0
9	Michalis Bakakis	DF	2014–2022	20	0
10	Anastasios Bakasetas	FW	2016–2019	19	0
11	Fotis Balopoulos	DF	1965–1969	10	0
12	Vasilis Barkas	GK	2018–2020	10	0
13	Angelos Basinas	MF	2008	6	0
14	Daniel Batista	FW	1995–1998	10	1
15	Dionysis Chiotis	GK	2002	1	0
16	Nikos Christidis	GK	1978	5	0
17	Lazaros Christodoulopoulos	MF	2017–2018	4	0
18	Kostas Christodoulou	FW	1938	1	0
19	Michalis Delavinias	GK	1948–1951	4	0
20	Traianos Dellas	DF	2001, 2006–2008	32	1
21	Vasilis Dimitriadis	FW	1991–1993	14	1
22	Giannis Dintsikos	FW	1984	3	0
23	Pavlos Emmanouilidis	FW	1950–1958	12	3
24	Konstantinos Galanopoulos	MF	2018–2024	8	1
25	Giorgos Gasparis	DF	1935–1938	2	0
26	Giorgos Giamalis	GK	1929–1932	10	0
27	Ilias Iliaskos	FW	1932	1	0
28	Spyros Ikonomopoulos	GK	1984–1989	12	0
29	Babis Intzoglou	DF	1976–1977	2	0
30	Giannis Kanakis	FW	1951	1	0
31	Giannis Kalitzakis	DF	1997–1999	21	0
32	Vaios Karagiannis	DF	1992	8	0
33	Giorgos Karafeskos	MF	1968–1971	8	0
34	Michalis Kasapis	DF	1994–2002	37	0
35	Kostas Katsouranis	MF	1976–1977	29	2
36	Pantelis Kafes	MF	2007–2011	10	0
37	Michalis Kapsis	DF	2003–2004	15	0
38	Giorgos Kefalidis	DF	1963	2	0
39	Spyros Kontoulis	MF	1938	3	0
40	Georgios Koutoulas	DF	1988–1990	11	0
41	Stefanos Konstantinidis	MF	1929–1932	6	0
42	Dimitrios Konstantopoulos	GK	2011	1	0
43	Nikos Kostenoglou	DF	1996	1	0
44	Christos Kostis	FW	1994–1997	11	3
45	Sotirios Kyrgiakos	DF	2008–2009	10	0
46	Panagiotis Lagos	MF	2006–2011	5	0
47	Vasilios Lakis	MF	1999–2004	35	3
48	Vasilios Lampropoulos	DF	2018–2019	2	0
49	Nikos Liberopoulos	FW	2004–2008, 2010–2012	30	5
50	Georgios Magiras	MF	1948–1949	4	0
51	Grigoris Makos	MF	2010–2012	10	0
52	Robert Mallios Galić	DF	1930–1933	12	1
53	Vasilios Manettas	FW	1938	1	0
54	Stelios Manolas	DF	1982–1994	71	6
55	Petros Mantalos	MF	2014–2025	71	7
56	Xenofon Markopoulos	FW	1948–1949	5	2
57	Dimitris Markos	MF	1998–1999	17	1
58	Kleanthis Maropoulos	FW	1938–1950	10	1
59	Thomas Mavros	FW	1976–1982	36	11
60	Antonis Minou	GK	1992–1993	16	0
61	Tasos Mitropoulos	FW	1992–1994	16	2
62	Georgios Mouratidis	MF	1951–1952	2	0
63	Vangelis Moras	DF	2006	1	0
64	Dimitris Nalitzis	FW	2002–2003	6	0
65	Kostas Negrepontis	FW	1929–1930	2	0
66	Kostas Nestoridis	FW	1956–1962	14	3
67	Kostas Nikolaidis	MF	1971–1973	4	0
68	Demis Nikolaidis	FW	1996–2003	54	17
69	Lakis Nikolaou	FW, DF	1973–1980	15	0
70	Takis Nikoloudis	MF	1976–1979	16	3
71	Marios Oikonomou	DF	2018–2020	1	0
72	Ilias Papageorgiou	FW	1950–1953	12	4
73	Georgios Papadopoulos	FW	1934–1938	9	0
74	Theologis Papadopoulos	GK	1986–1987	24	0
75	Michalis Papatheodorou	FW	1950–1951	2	0
76	Mimis Papaioannou	FW	1963–1978	61	29
77	Pavlos Papaioannou	MF	1985–1992	10	0
78	Sokratis Papastathopoulos	DF	2008	3	0
79	Antonis Parayios	DF	1950–1951	2	0
80	Vangelis Paraprastanitis	DF	1980	1	0
81	Panagiotis Patakas	FW	1952	1	0
82	Giorgos Petridis	MF	1963	1	1
83	Vasilios Pliatsikas	MF	2008	1	0
84	Spyros Pomonis	FW	1964–1972	5	1
85	Kostas Poulis	MF	1950–1953	9	0
86	Petros Ravousis	DF	1976–1981	22	0
87	Christos Ribas	GK	1933–1936	9	0
88	Lazaros Rota	DF	2022–	29	0
89	Dimitris Saravakos	FW	1994	1	1
90	Lambis Serafidis	FW	1952	2	0
91	Stelios Serafidis	GK	1963	1	0
92	Giorgos Sidiropoulos	GK	1975	1	0
93	Stelios Skevofilakas	MF	1963–1966	11	0
94	Spyros Sklavounos	GK	1932	3	0
95	Alekos Sofianidis	DF	1959–1967	7	0
96	Nikos Stathopoulos	MF	1969–1971	12	0
97	Stavros Stamatis	MF	1989–1990	5	0
98	Andreas Stamatiadis	FW	1954–1963	8	0
99	Lakis Stergioudas	GK	1976–1977	5	0
100	Stratos Svarnas	DF	2020–2022	6	0
101	Stefanos Theodoridis	DF	1971	1	0
102	Apostolos Toskas	DF	1969–1973	20	0
103	Dionysis Tsamis	MF	1975–1976	2	0
104	Vasilios Tsiartas	MF	1994–1996, 2000–2004	56	10
105	Aris Tsachouridis	FW	1963	1	0
106	Tryfon Tzanetis	FW	1949	1	0
107	Adam Tzanetopoulos	DF	2015–2018	1	0
108	Georgios Tzavellas	DF	2021–2023	9	0
109	Tasos Vasiliou	DF	1966–1967	2	0
110	Vangelis Vlachos	MF	1982–1984	4	0
111	Michalis Vlachos	DF	1994–1997	10	0
112	Theodoros Zagorakis	MF	2000–2004	45	0
113	Akis Zikos	MF	1999–2001	18	0

== List of former players ==
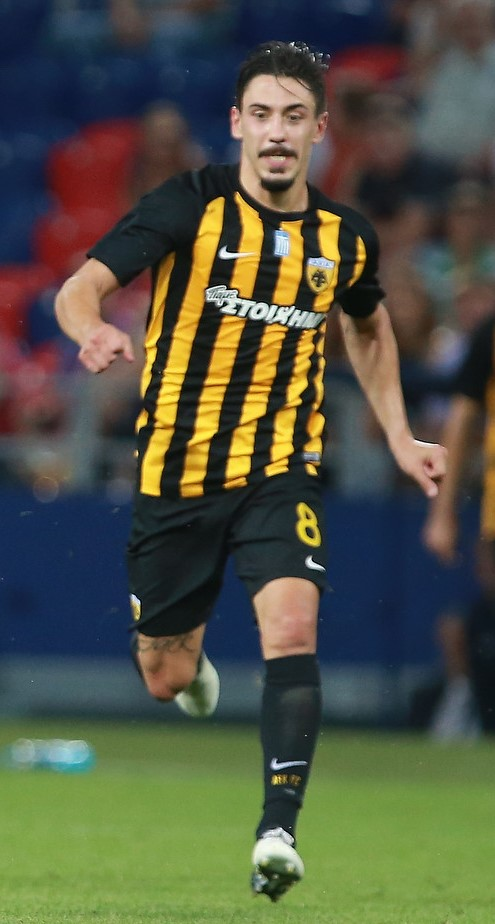
André Simões

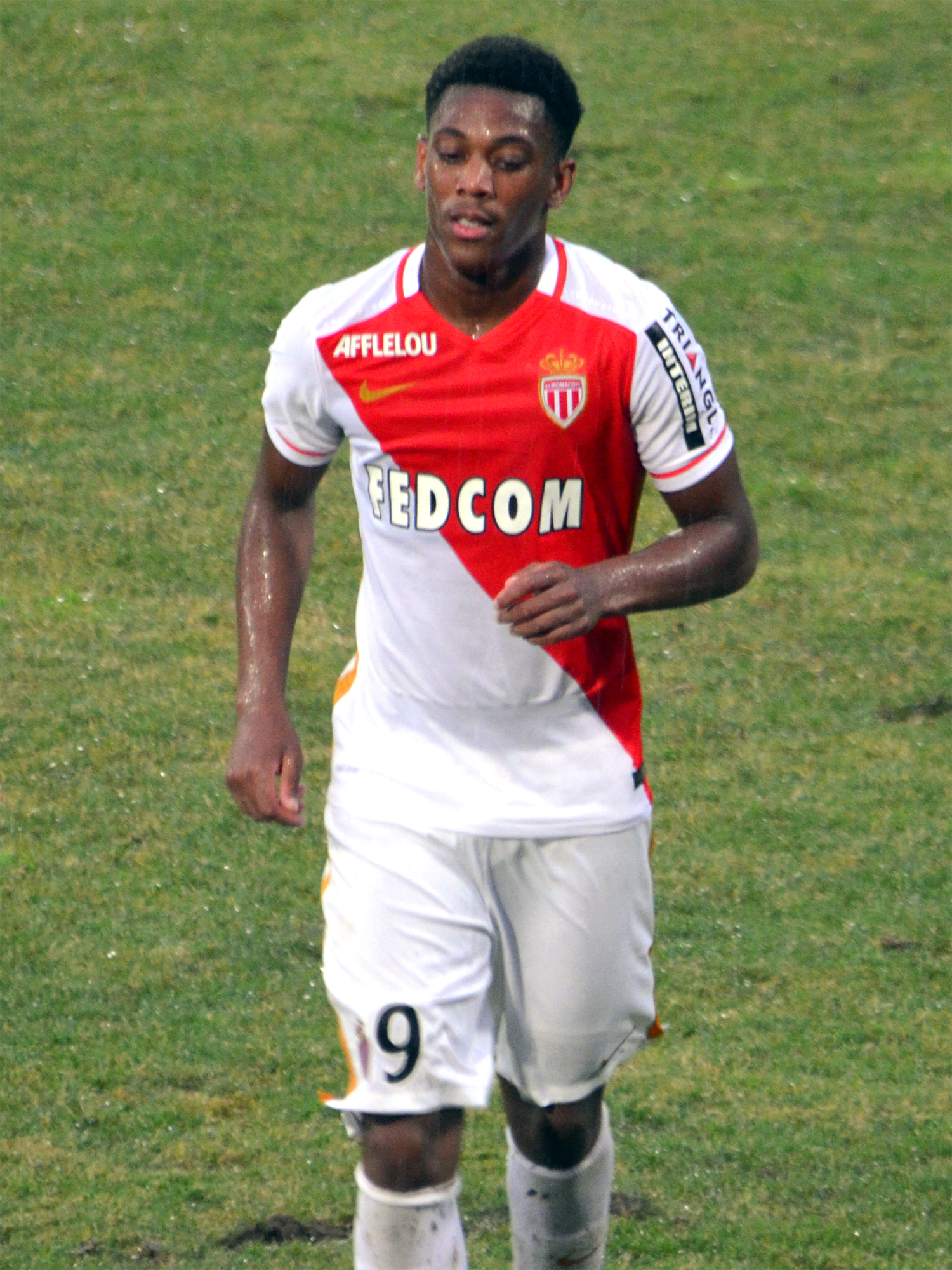
Anthony Martial

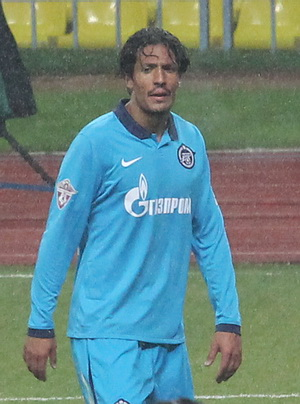
Bruno Alves

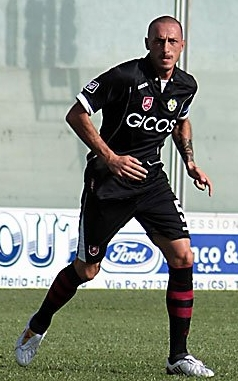
Bruno Cirillo

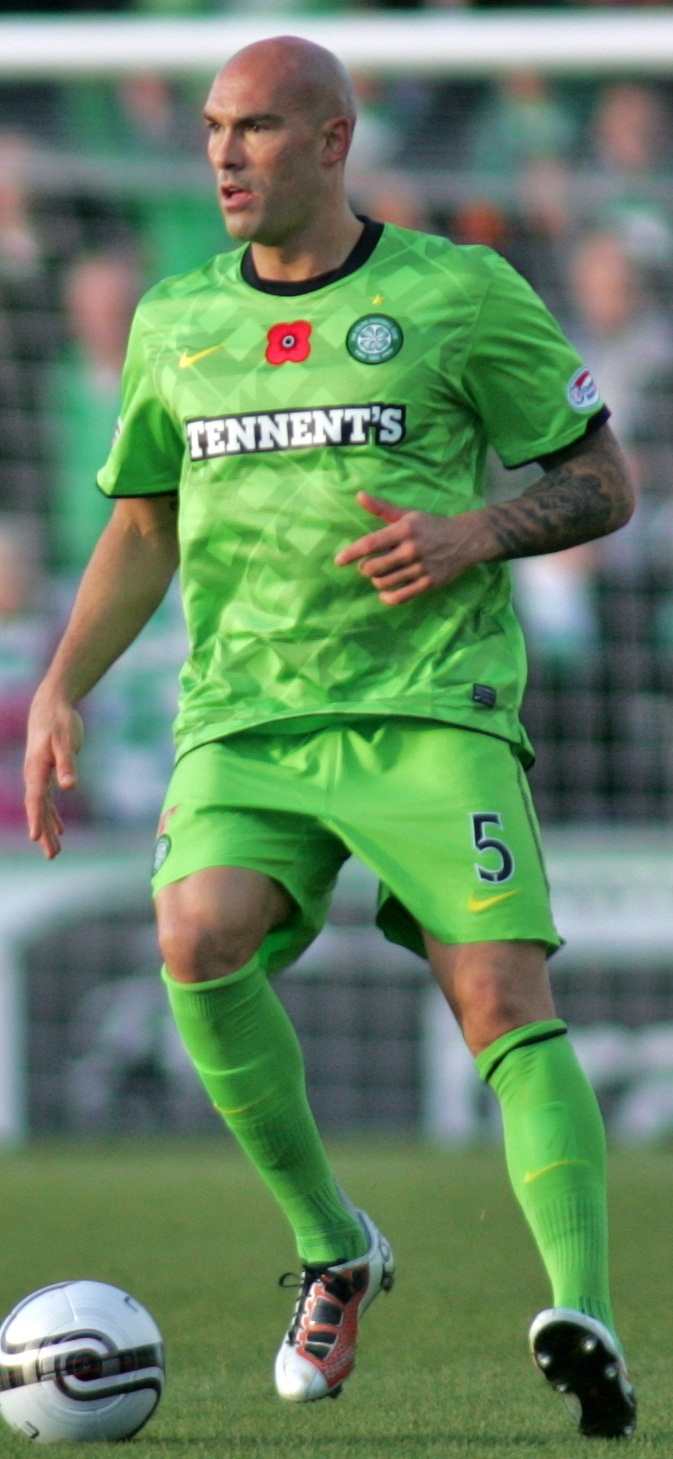
Daniel Majstorović

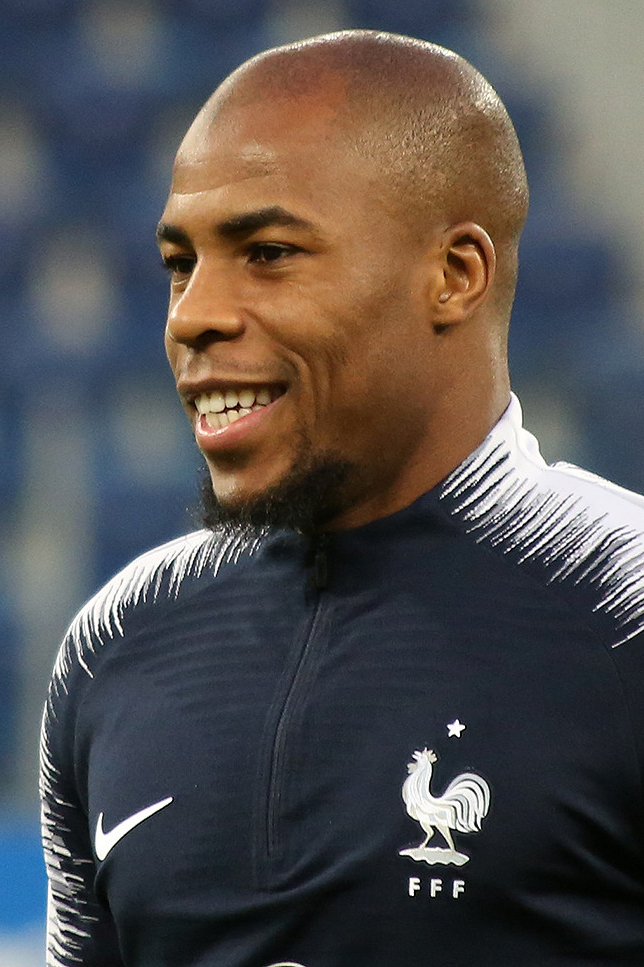
Djibril Sidibé

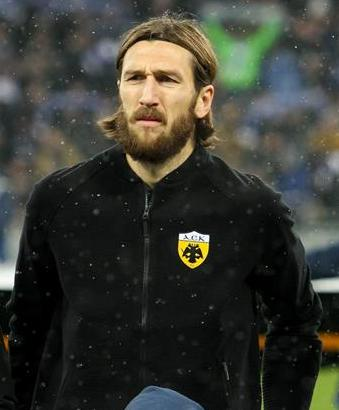
Dmytro Chyhrynskyi

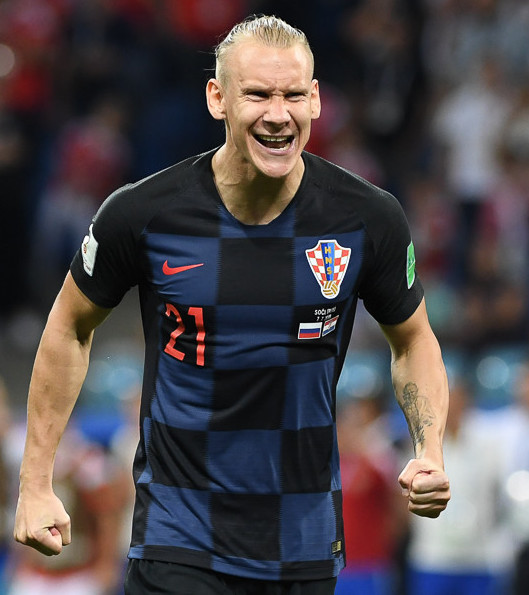
Domagoj Vida

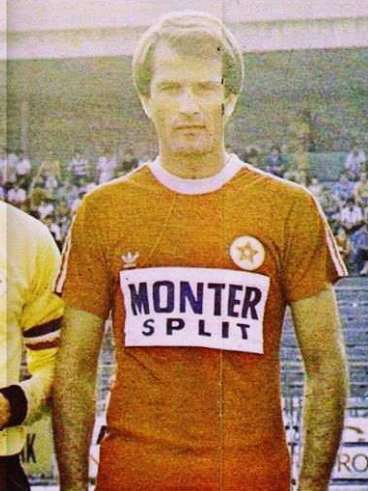
Dušan Bajević

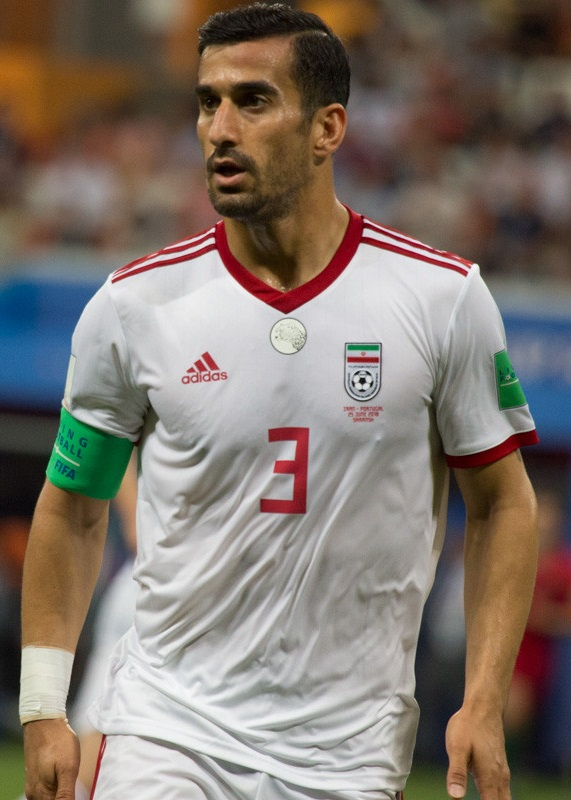
Ehsan Hajsafi

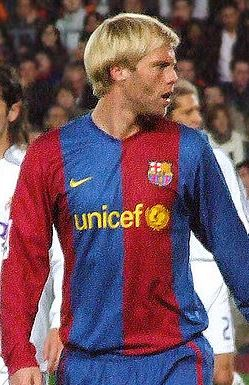
Eidur Gudjohnsen

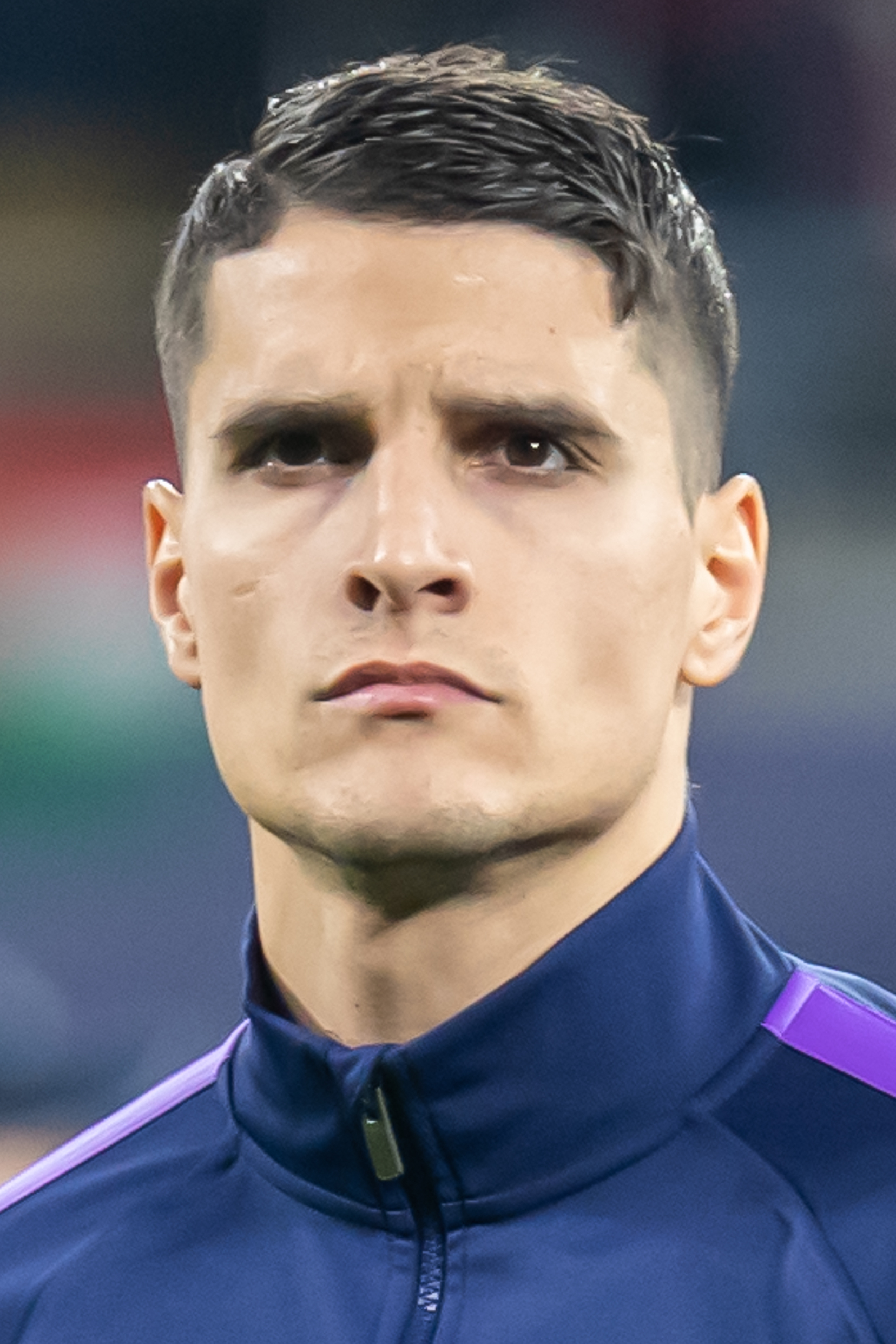
Erik Lamela

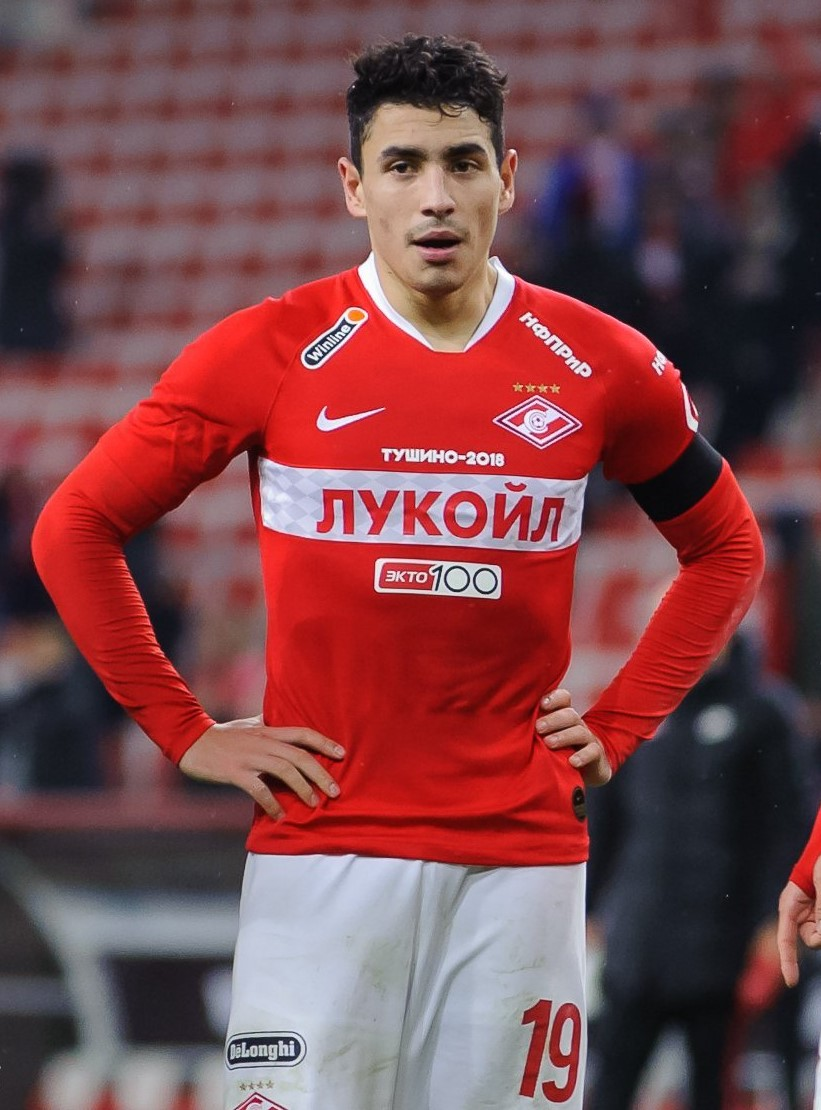
Ezequiel Ponce

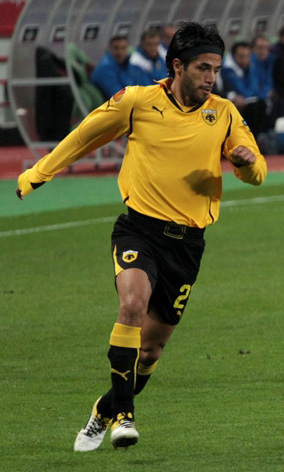
Fabián Vargas

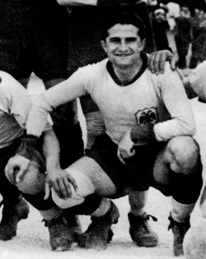
Georgios Magiras

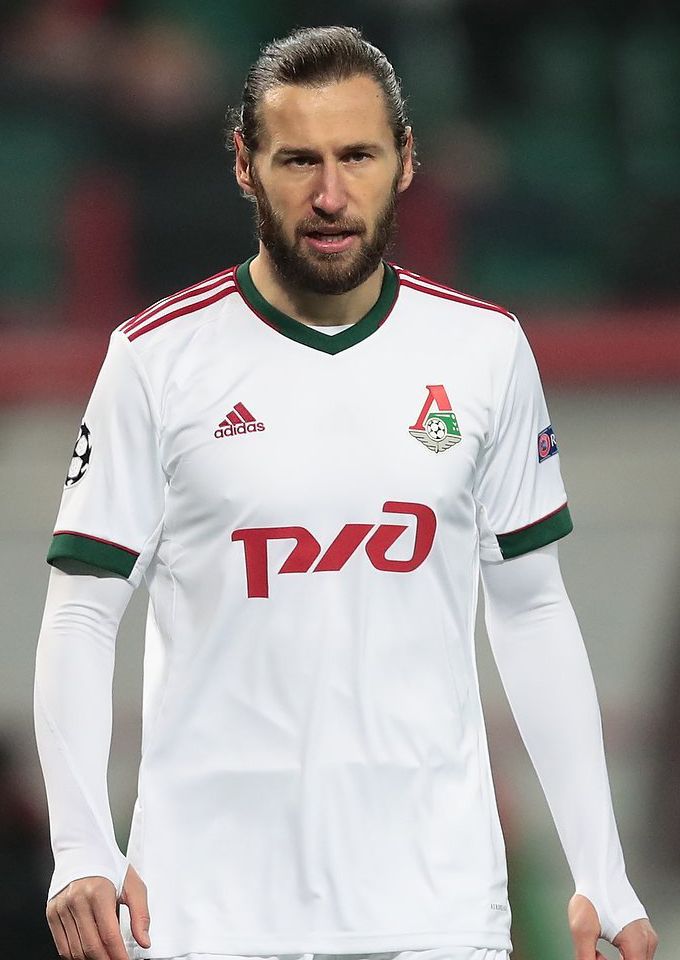
Grzegorz Krychowiak

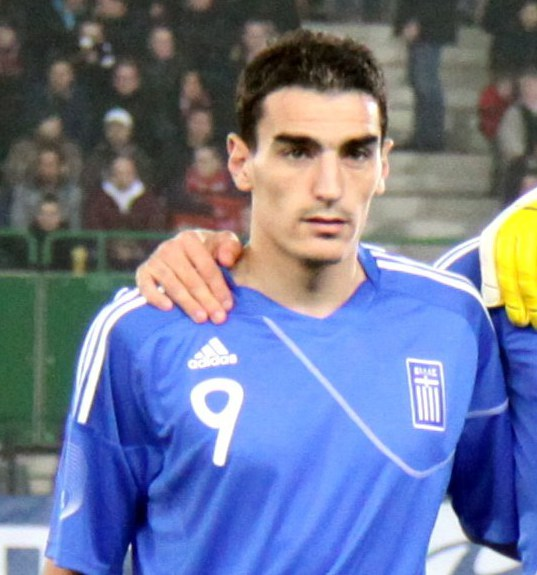
Lazaros Christodoulopoulos

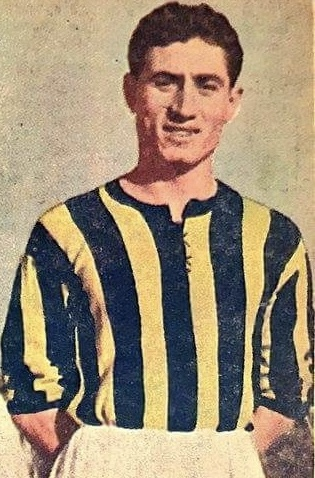
Lefter Küçükandonyadis

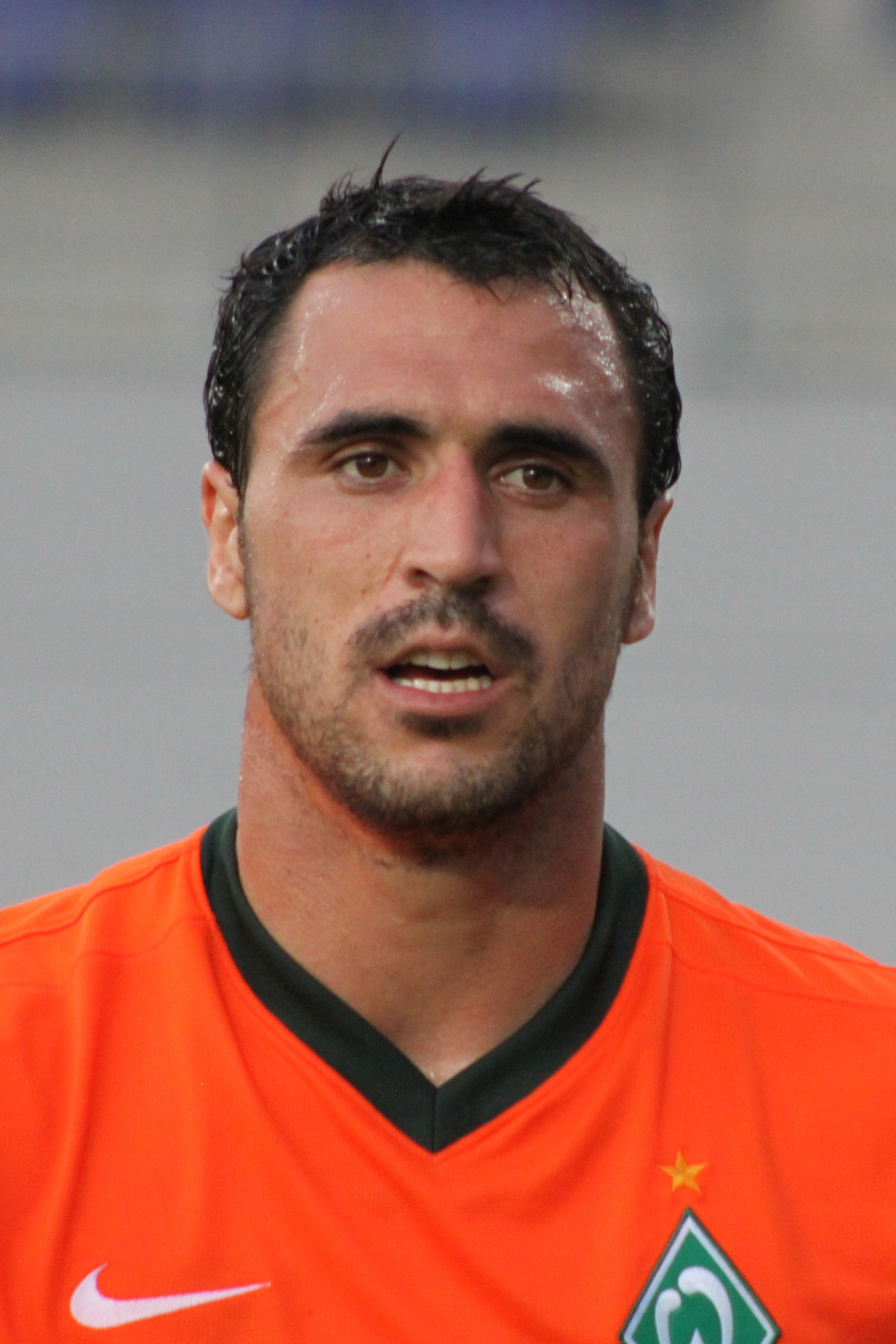
Hugo Almeida

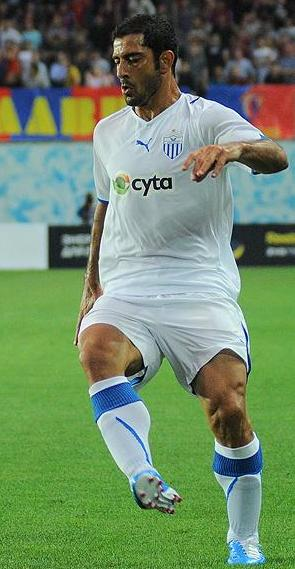
Ioannis Okkas

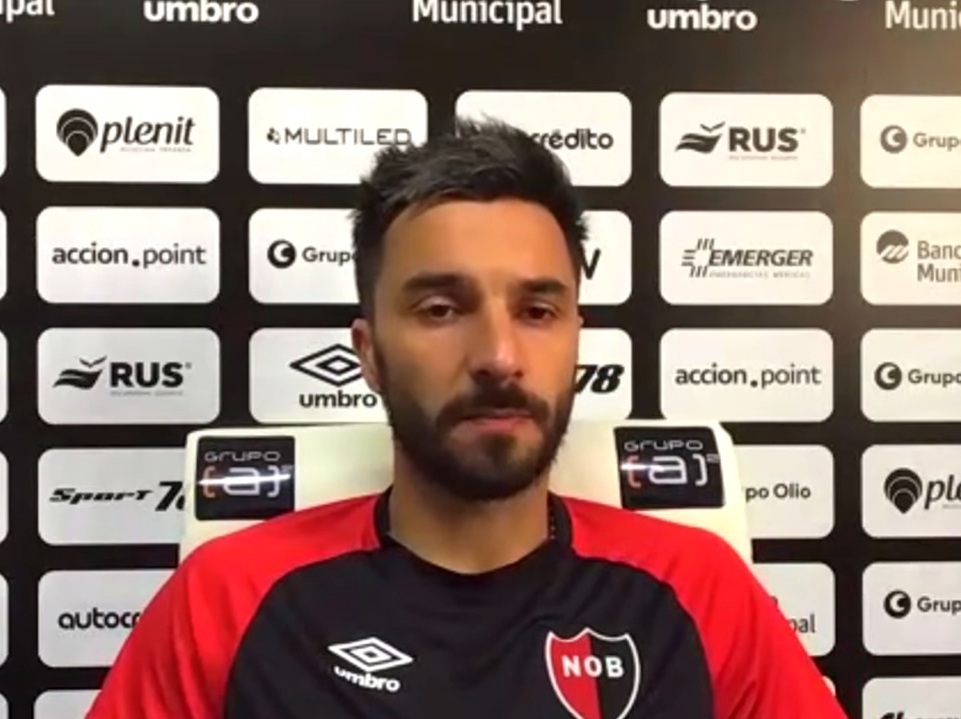
Ignacio Scocco

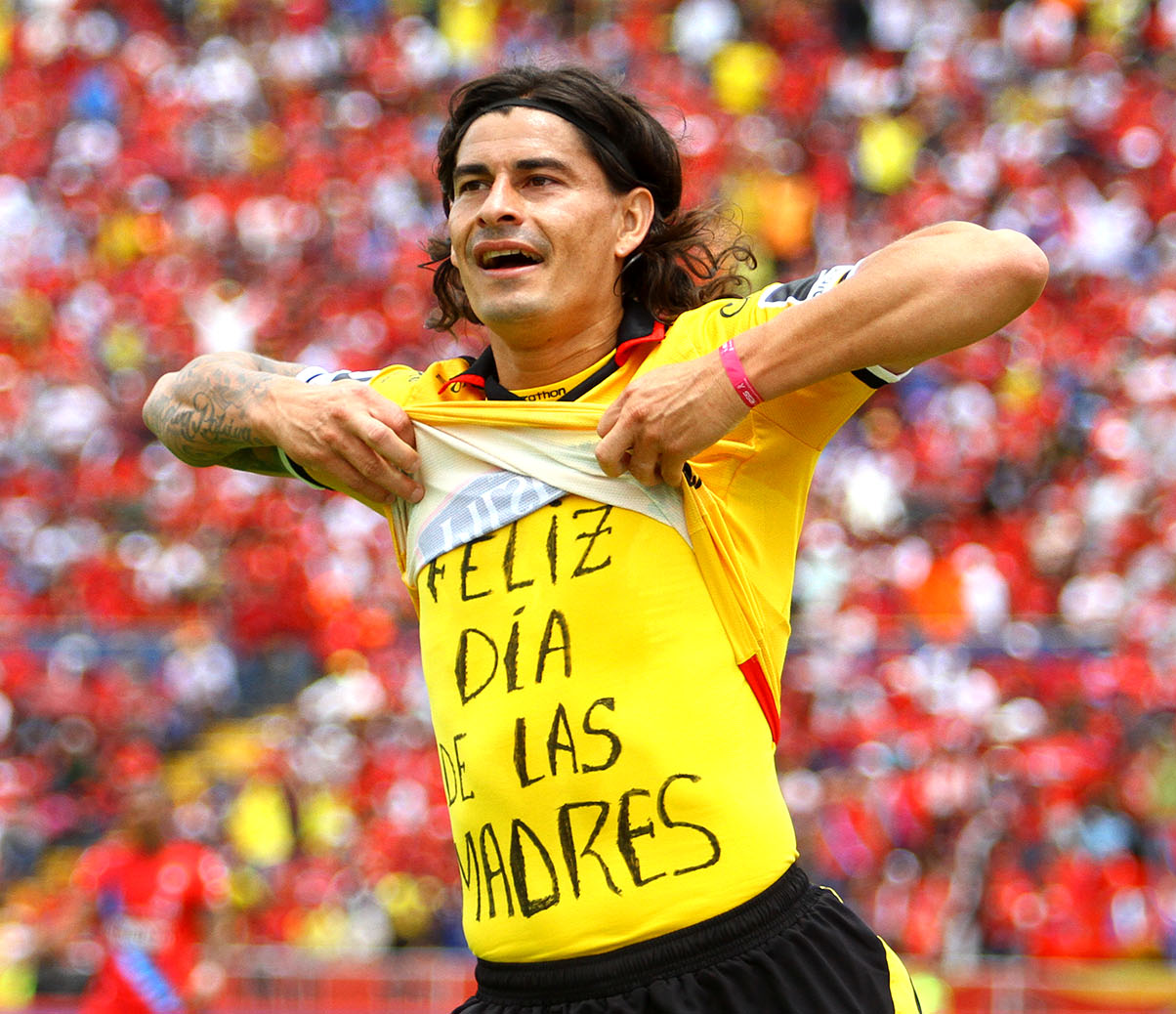
Ismael Blanco

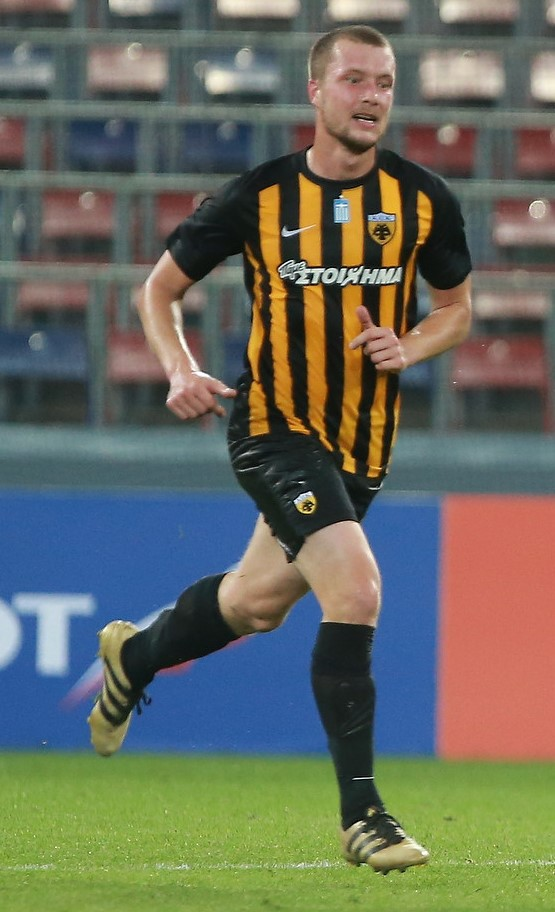
Jakob Johansson

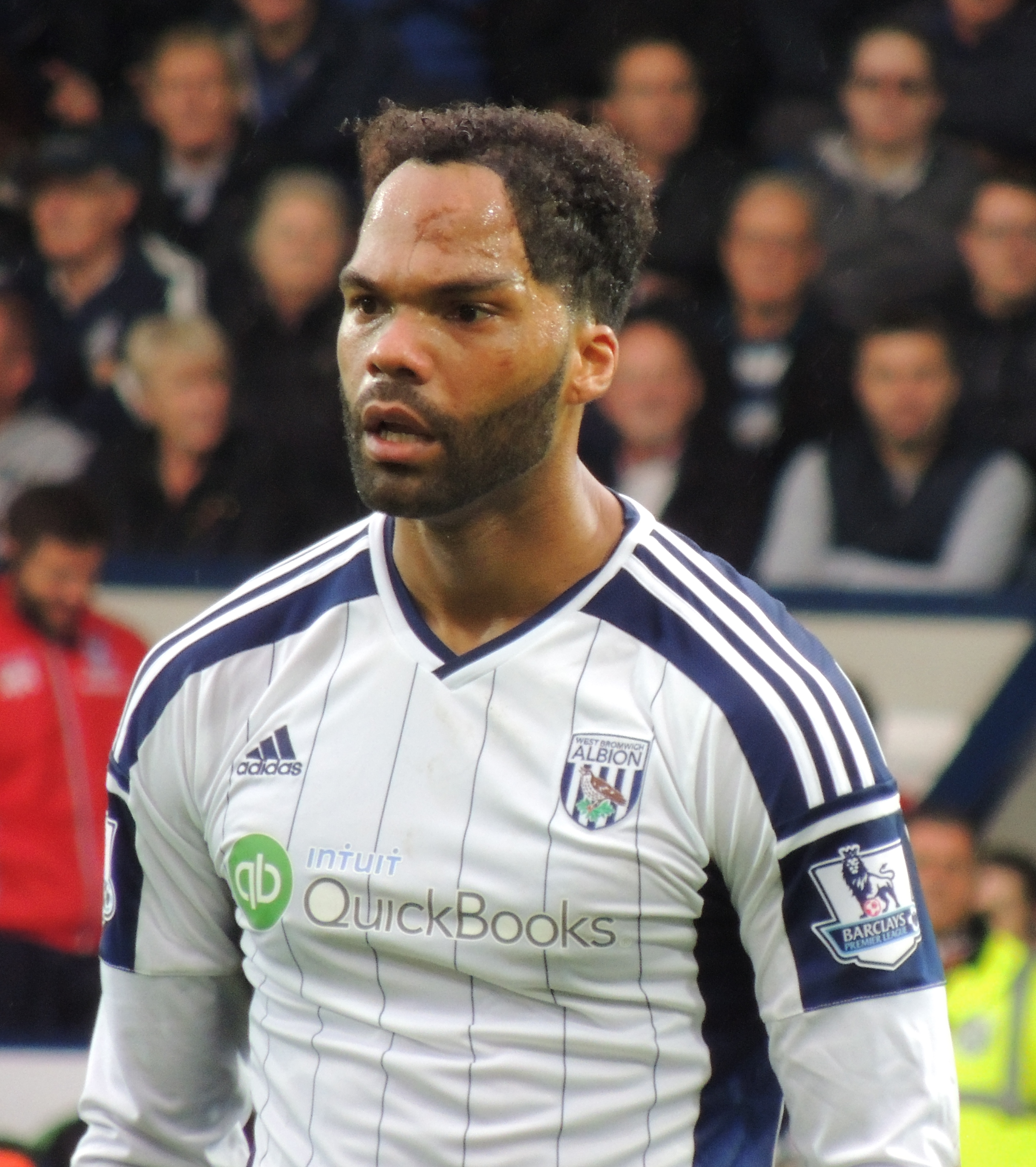
Joleon Lescott

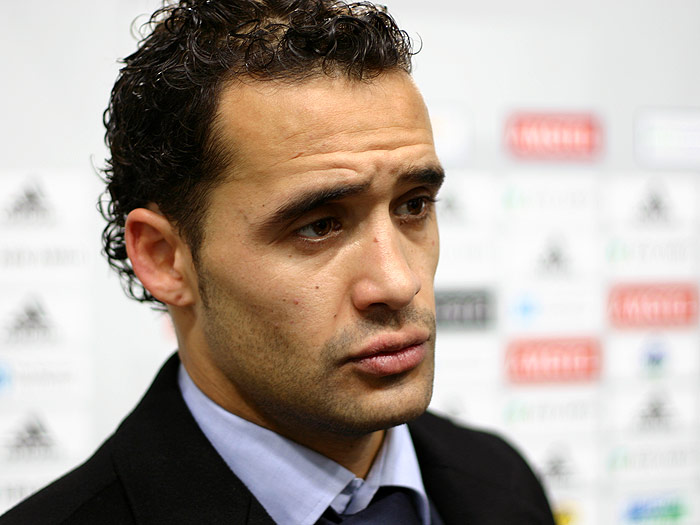
Juanfran

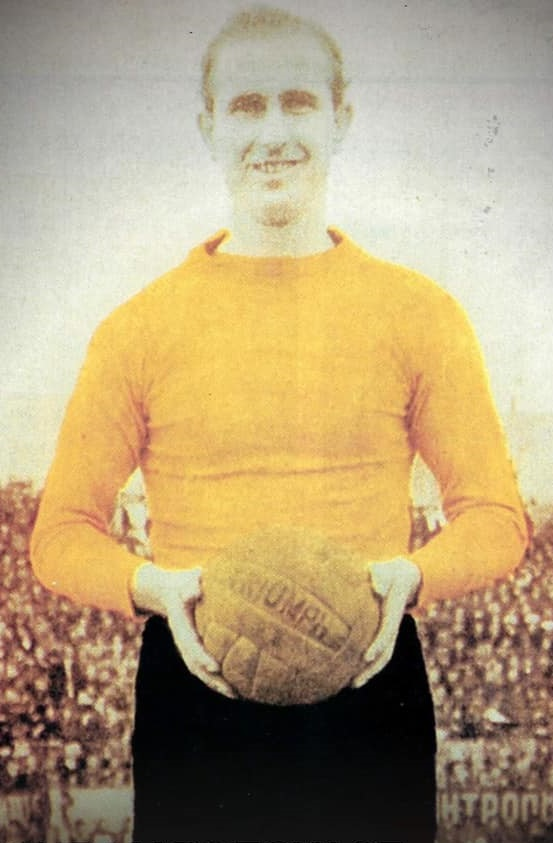
Kleanthis Maropoulos

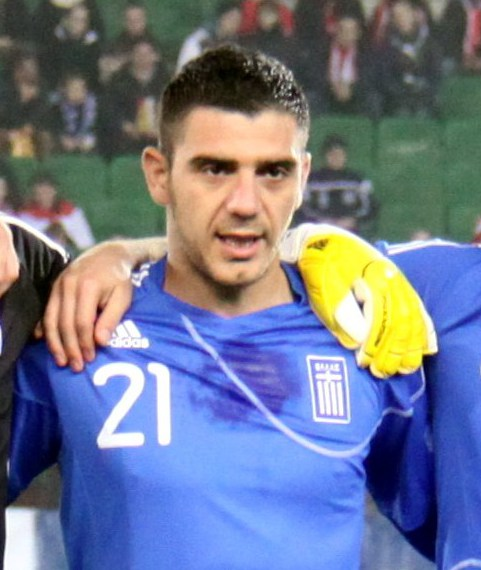
Kostas Katsouranis

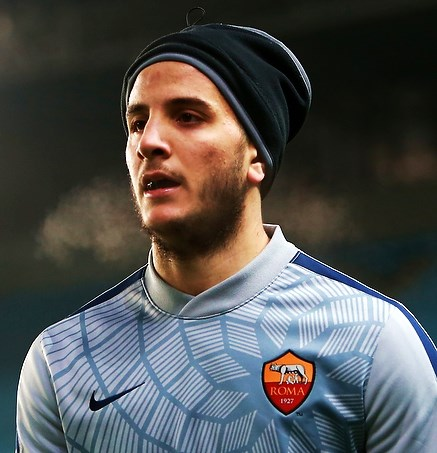
Kostas Manolas

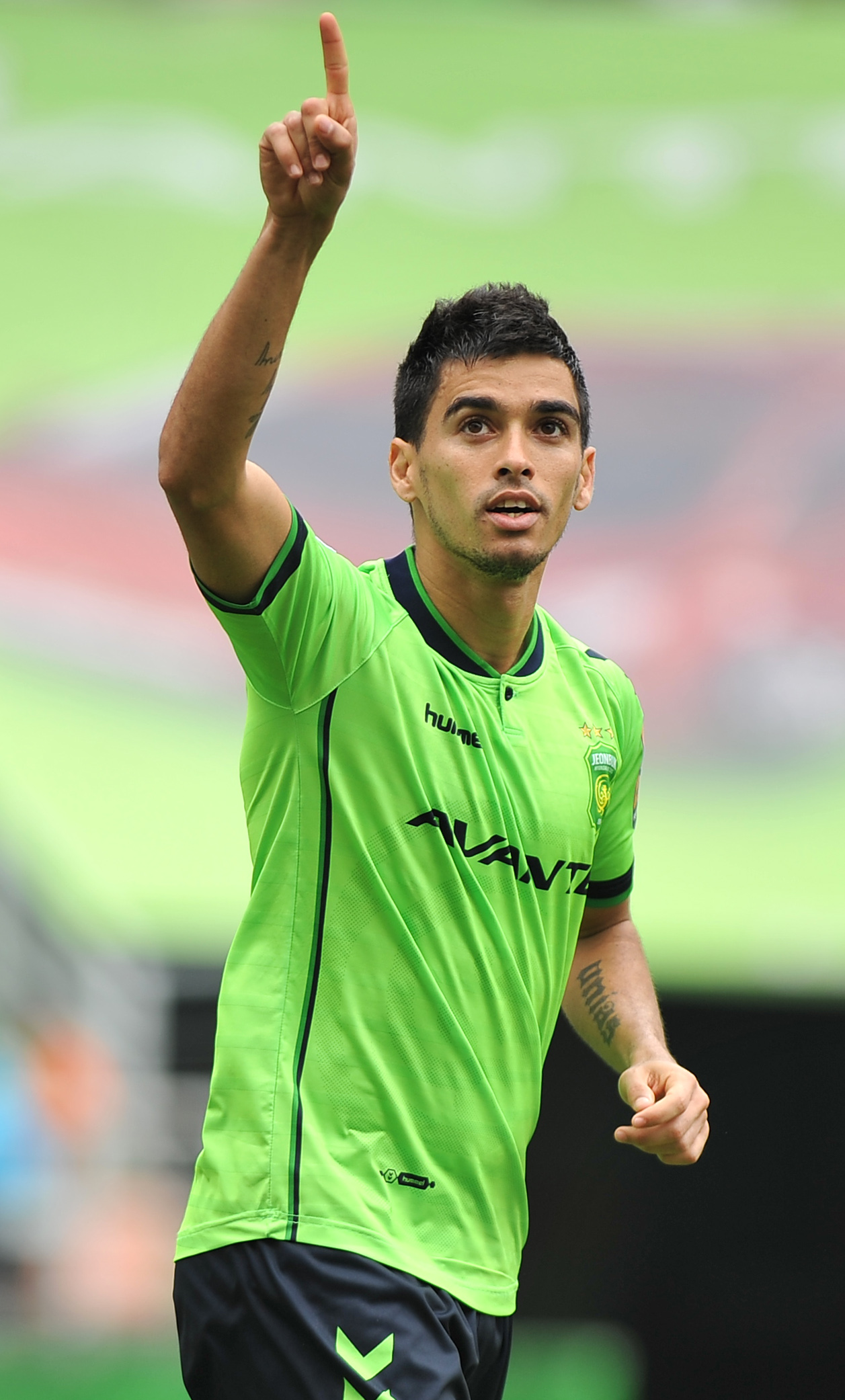
Leonardo

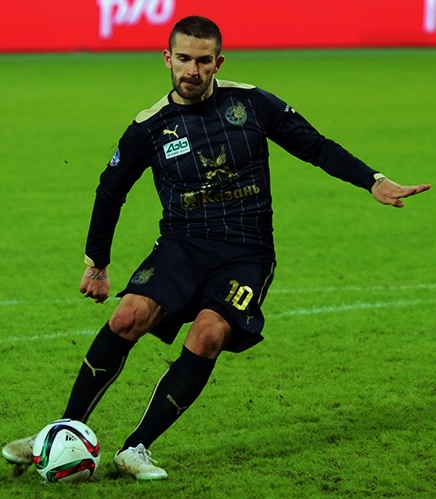
Marko Livaja

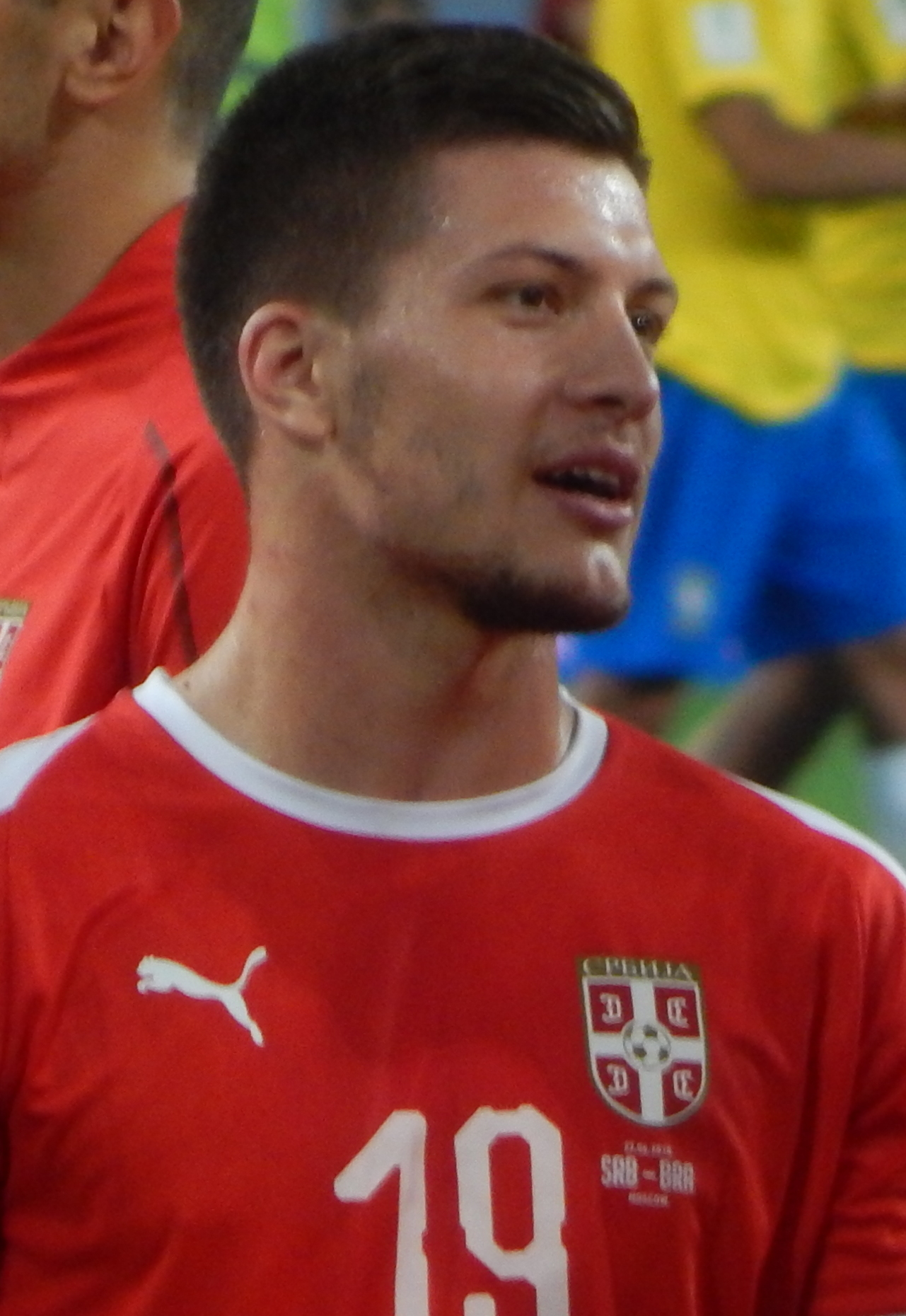
Luka Jović

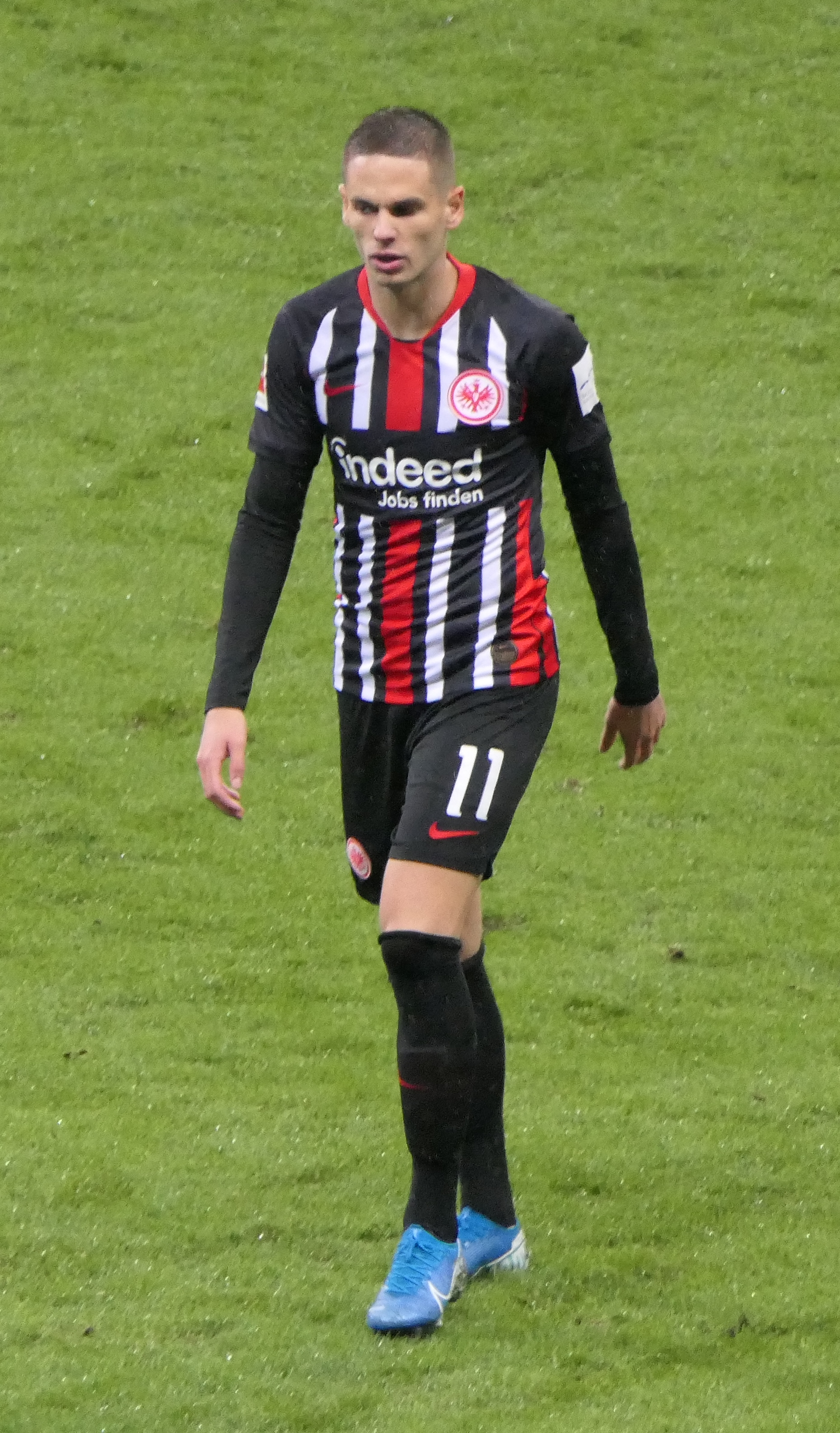
Mijat Gaćinović

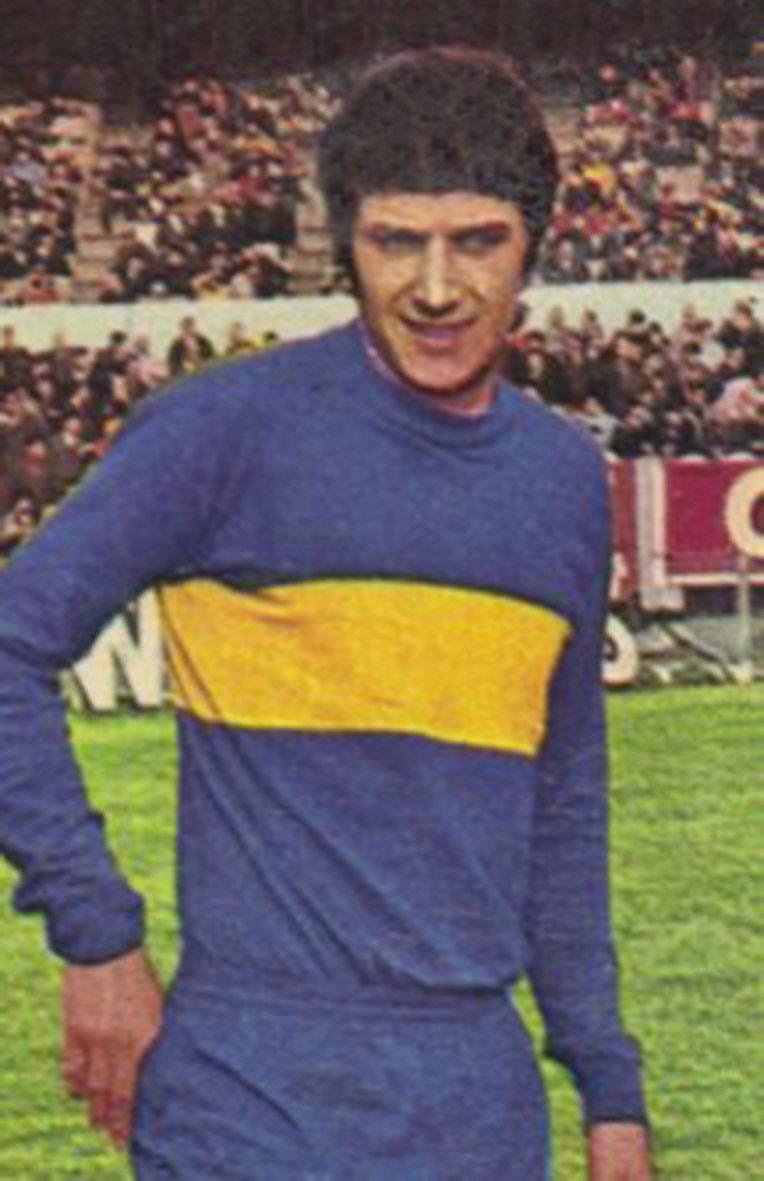
Milton Viera

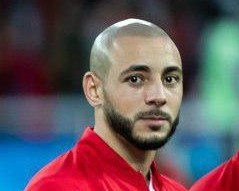
Nordin Amrabat

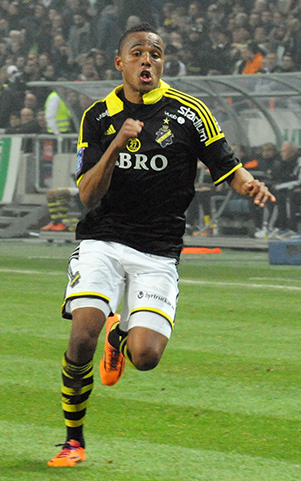
Niclas Eliasson

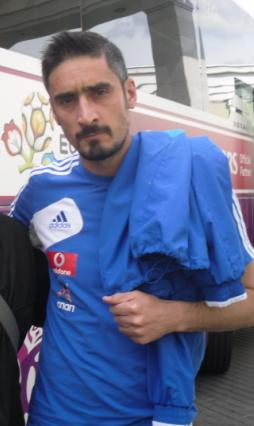
Nikos Liberopoulos

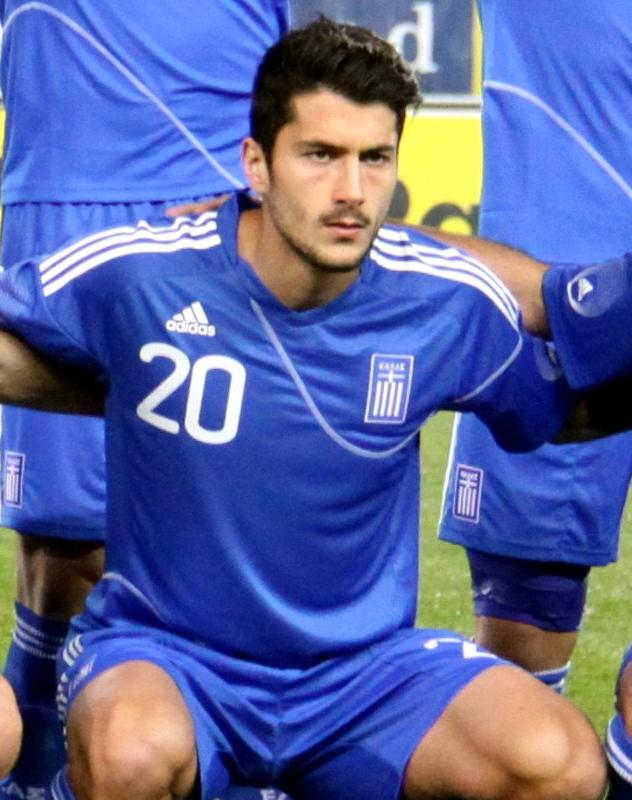
Panagiotis Kone

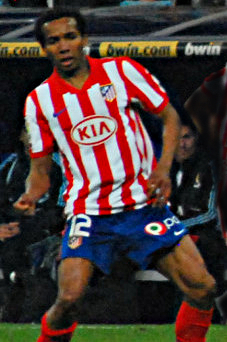
Paulo Assunção

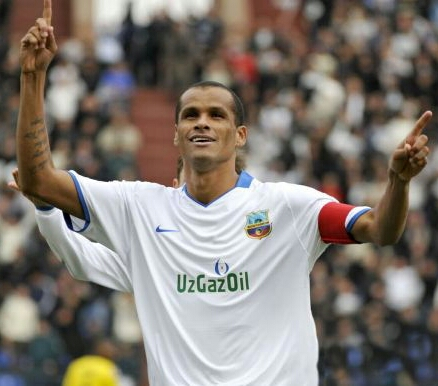
Rivaldo

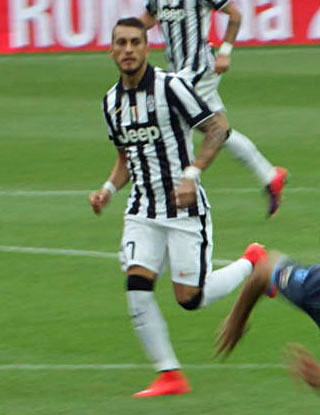
Roberto Pereyra

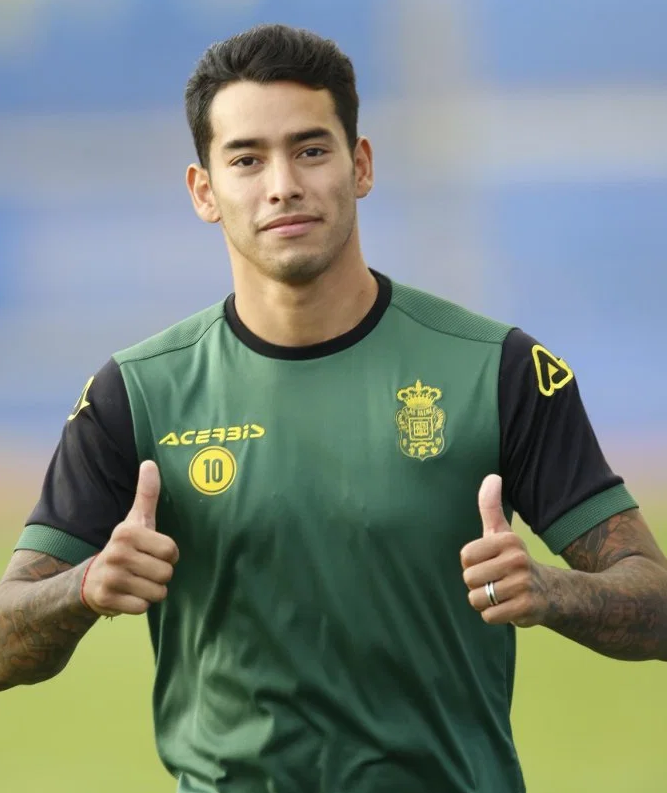
Sergio Araujo

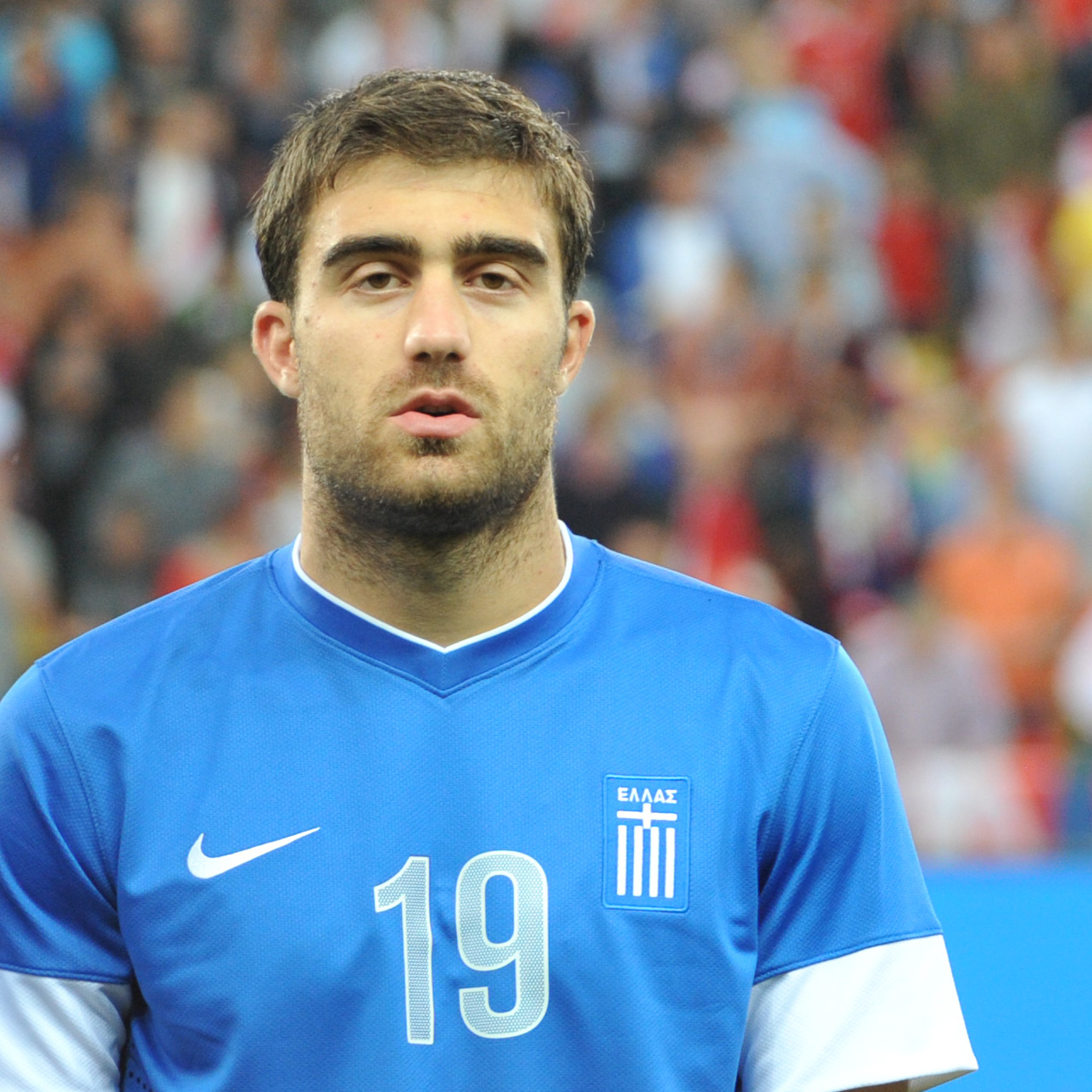
Sokratis Papastathopoulos

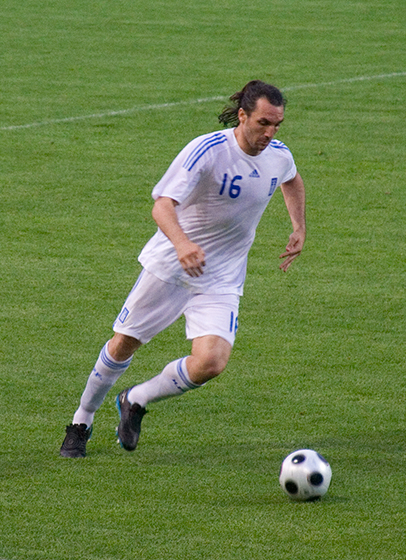
Sotirios Kyrgiakos

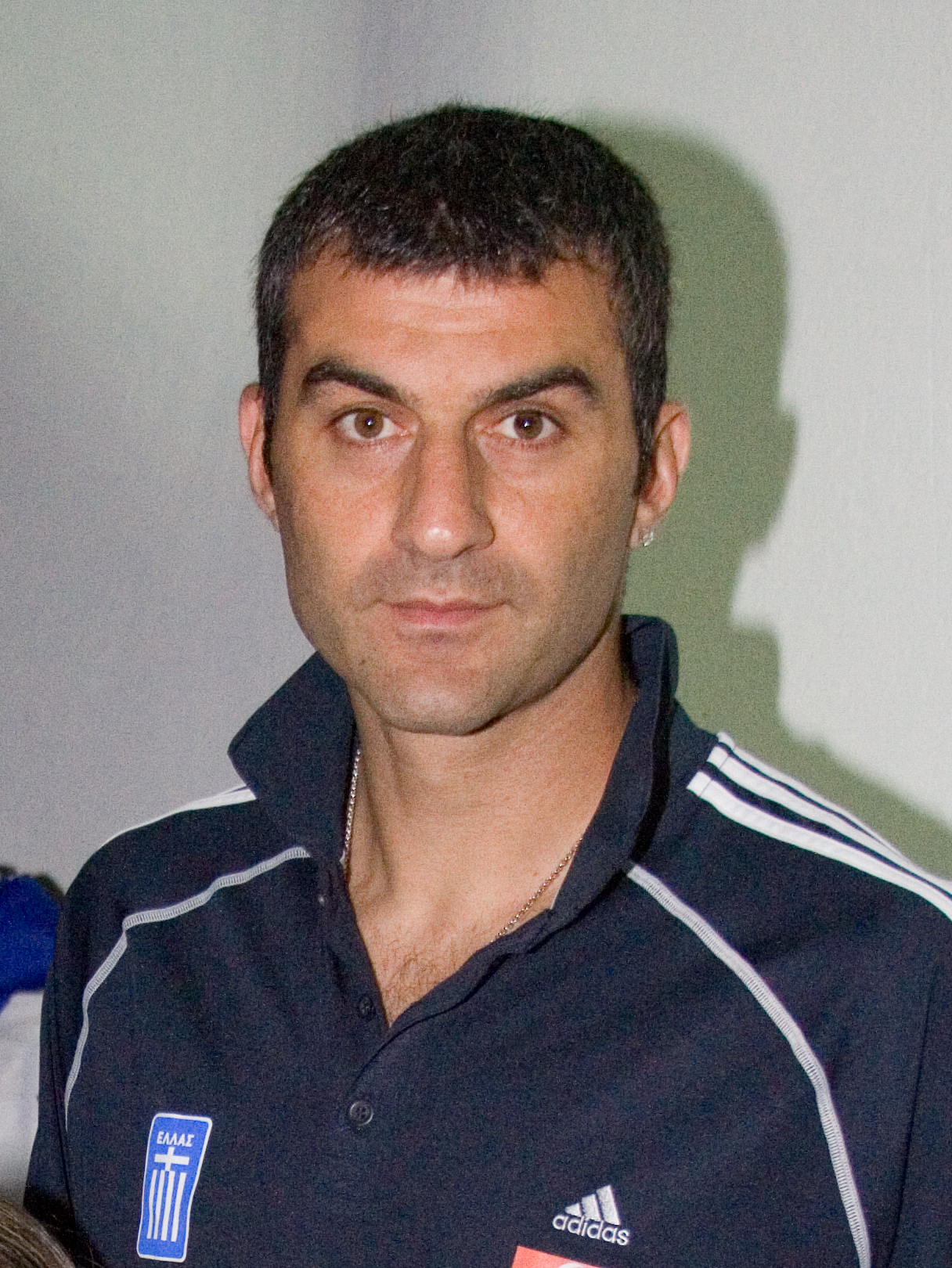
Traianos Dellas

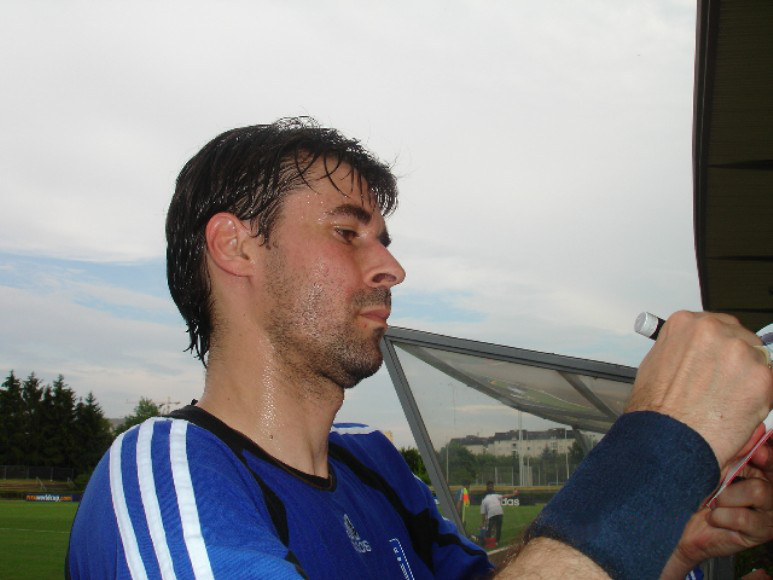
Vasilios Tsiartas

== Personnel ==
=== Ownership and current board ===
Position	Staff
Owner	(Greece) Marios Iliopoulos
President	(Greece) Evangelos Aslanidis
1st Vice President & CEO	(Cyprus) Minas Lysandrou
2nd Vice President	(Greece) Alexis Alexiou
3rd Vice President	(Greece) Alexis Dedes
Board Members	(Greece) Georgios N. Kanellopoulos (Greece) Nikos Pantermalis

Source: AEK Athens F.C.

=== Executives ===
==== Administration Department ====
Position	Staff
General Manager	(Greece) Angeliki Arkadi
CFO	(Greece) Andreas Christakos
Commercial Director	(Greece) Nikos Karaouzas
Press Officer	(Greece) Tasos Tsatalis

Source: AEK Athens F.C.

==== Football Department ====
Position	Staff
Director of Football	(Spain) Javier Ribalta
Deputy Director of Football	(Greece) Kostas Stavrothanasopoulos
Head of Football Operations	(Greece) Alex Clainos
Head of Scouting	(Italy) Roberto Malfitano
Scout	(Italy) Francesco Panfili
Recruitment Data Scientist	(Italy) Alessio Ecca
Team Managers	(Greece) Dimitris Nalitzis (Greece) Panos Anastasopoulos

Source: AEK Athens F.C.

=== Coaching and medical staff ===
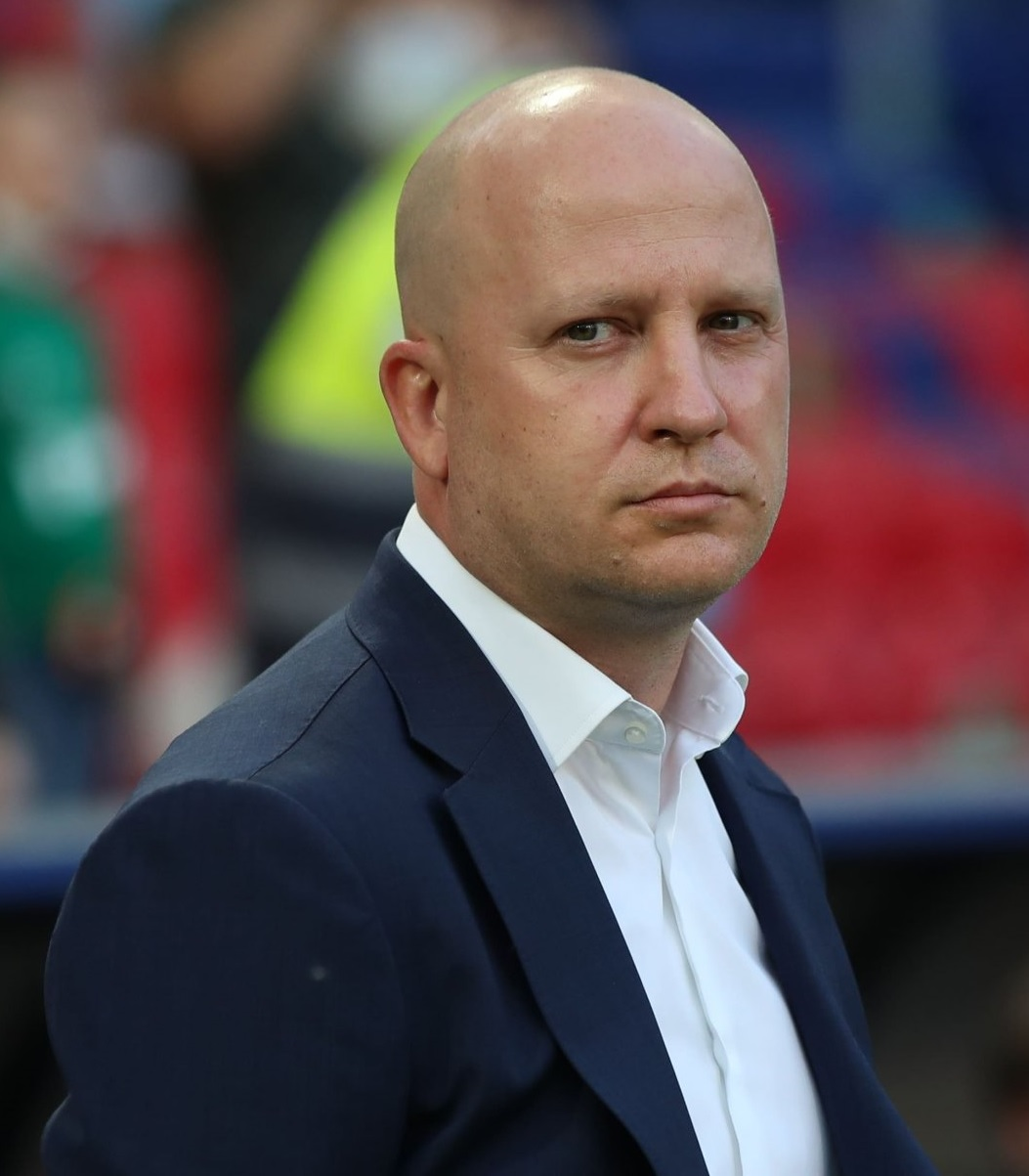
Marko Nikolić is the team's current head coach.

Coaching staff

Position	Staff
Head coach	(Serbia) Marko Nikolić
Assistant coaches	(Serbia) Radoje Smiljanić (Serbia) Milija Žižić (Serbia) Nemanja Rnić (Greece) Ilias Kyriakidis
Head of performance	(Serbia) Goran Basarić
Fitness coaches	(Greece) Kostas Konstantopoulos (Greece) Sotiris Mavros
Goalkeeper coach	(Austria) Christian Dobnik
Analyst	(Greece) Vasilios Armatas
Opponents analyst	(Greece) Kostas Charpidis
Rehabilitation coach	(Greece) Ignatios Sakellaridis

Source: AEK Athens F.C.

Medical staff

Position	Staff
Medical director	(Greece) Lakis Nikolaou
Doctor	(Greece) Nikos Tzouroudis
Podiatrist	(Greece) Manos Arvanitakis
Kinesiologist	(Greece) Dimitris Dimas
Εrgophysiologist	(Greece) Dimitris Stergiopoulos
Nutritionists	(Greece) Daniel Kapsis (Greece) Dimitris Kakouros
Physiotherapists	(Greece) Christos Dedousis (Greece) Konstantinos Pavlidis (Greece) Dimitris Prevenios (Greece) Vasilios Laosoglou
Assistant physiotherapists	(Greece) Alexis Asprogiannis (Greece) Taxiarchis Kagiaros

Source: AEK Athens F.C.

Other staff

Position	Staff
Team manager assistant	(Greece) Antonis Maos
Kit mens	(Greece) Spyros Mallioras (Greece) Manolis Fanelakis (Greece) Giannis Manthos

Source: AEK Athens F.C.

=== Presidents ===
AEK Athens F.C. presidential history from 1924 to present
Konstantinos Spanoudis (1924–33); Konstantinos Konstantaras (1933–36); Konstantinos Zarifis (1936–37); Konstantinos Theofanidis (1937–39); Konstantinos Chrysopoulos (1939–40); Ioannis Chrysafidis (1940); Emilios Ionas (1943–46); Spyridon Skouras (1946–48); Georgios Melas (1948–53); Eleftherios Venizelos (1953–54); Georgios Chrysafidis (1954–57); Nikos Goumas (1957–63); Alexandros Makridis (1963–65); Georgios Toubalidis (1965–66); Michail Trikoglou (1966–67); Emmanouil Kalitsounakis (1967); Kosmas Kyriakidis (1967–69); Georgios Chrysafidis (1969–70); Kosmas Chatzicharalampous (1970–73); Dimitrios Avramidis (1973)	Ioannis Theodorakopoulos (1973–74); Loukas Barlos (1974–81); Andreas Zafiropoulos (1981–82); Michalis Arkadis (1982–83); Lefteris Panagidis (1983–84); Andreas Zafiropoulos (1984–88); Kostas Generakis (1988); Stratos Gidopoulos (1988–91); Kostas Angelopoulos (1991); Kostas Generakis (1991–92); Dimitris Melissanidis (1992–93); Giannis Karras (1993–94); Dimitris Melissanidis (1994–95); Giannis Karras (1995); Michalis Trochanas (1995–96); Nikos Stratos (1996); Georgios Kyriopoulos (1996–97); Alexis Kougias (1997); Lakis Nikolaou (1997–98); Kostas Generakis (1998–99)	Stefanos Mamatzis (1999–2000); Cornelius Sierhuis (2000–01); Filon Antonopoulos (2001); Petros Stathis (2001); Chrarilaos Psomiadis (2001–03); Giannis Granitsas (2003–04); Kostas Generakis (2004); Alexis Kougias (2004); Andreas Dimitrelos (2004); Demis Nikolaidis (2004–08); Georgios Kintis (2008–09); Nikos Thanopoulos (2009–10); Stavros Adamidis (2010–12); Andreas Dimitrelos (2012); Thomas Mavros (2012); Andreas Dimitrelos (2012–13); Evangelos Aslanidis (2014–)

=== Notable managers ===
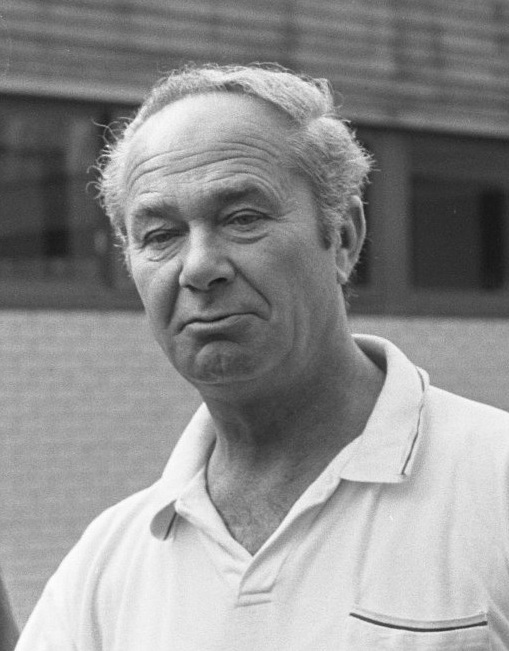
František Fadrhonc led AEK Athens to the 1976–77 UEFA Cup semi-finals

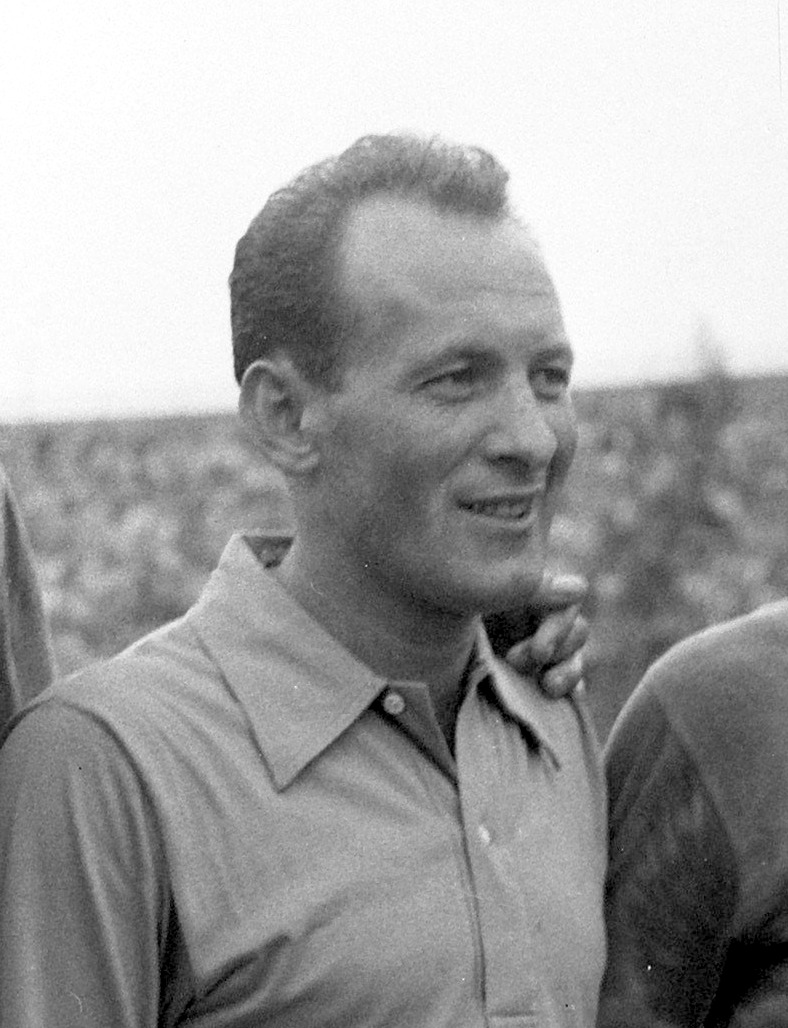
Zlatko Čajkovski 1977–78 Alpha Ethniki champion and 1977–78 Greek Cup winner

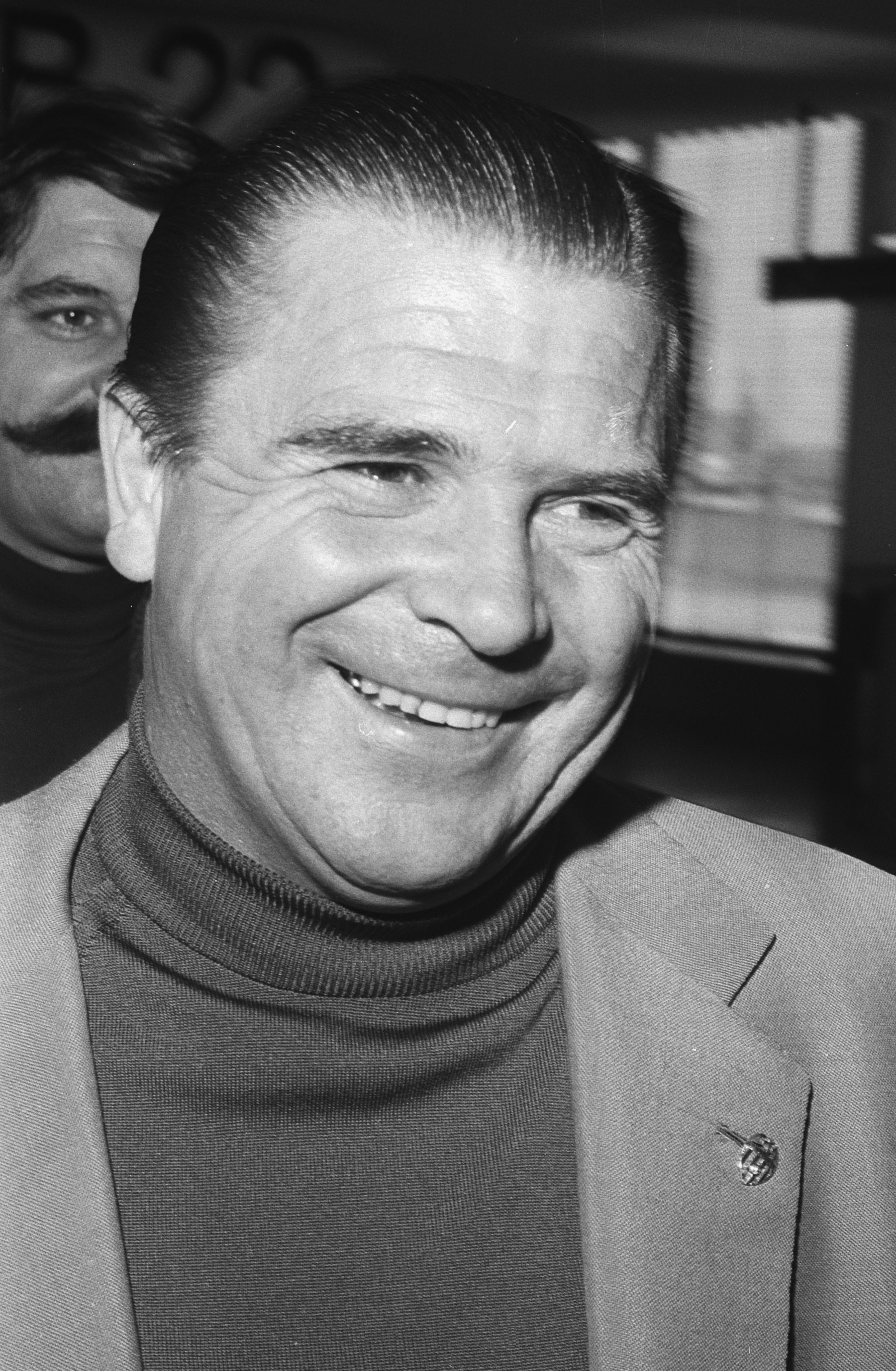
The 'Mighty Magyar', Ferenc Puskás, manager of the club in the 1978–79 season

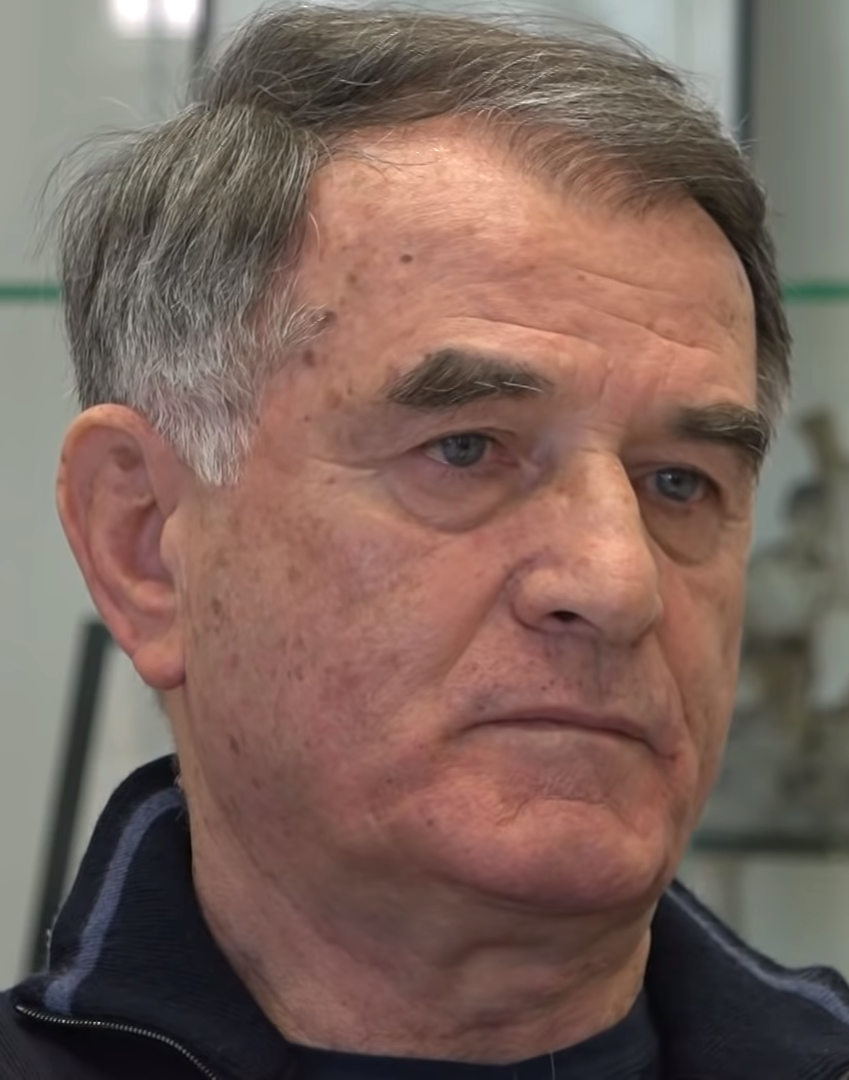
Dušan Bajević 4 times Alpha Ethniki champion, 1 time Greek Cup, Greek League Cup and Greek Super Cup winner

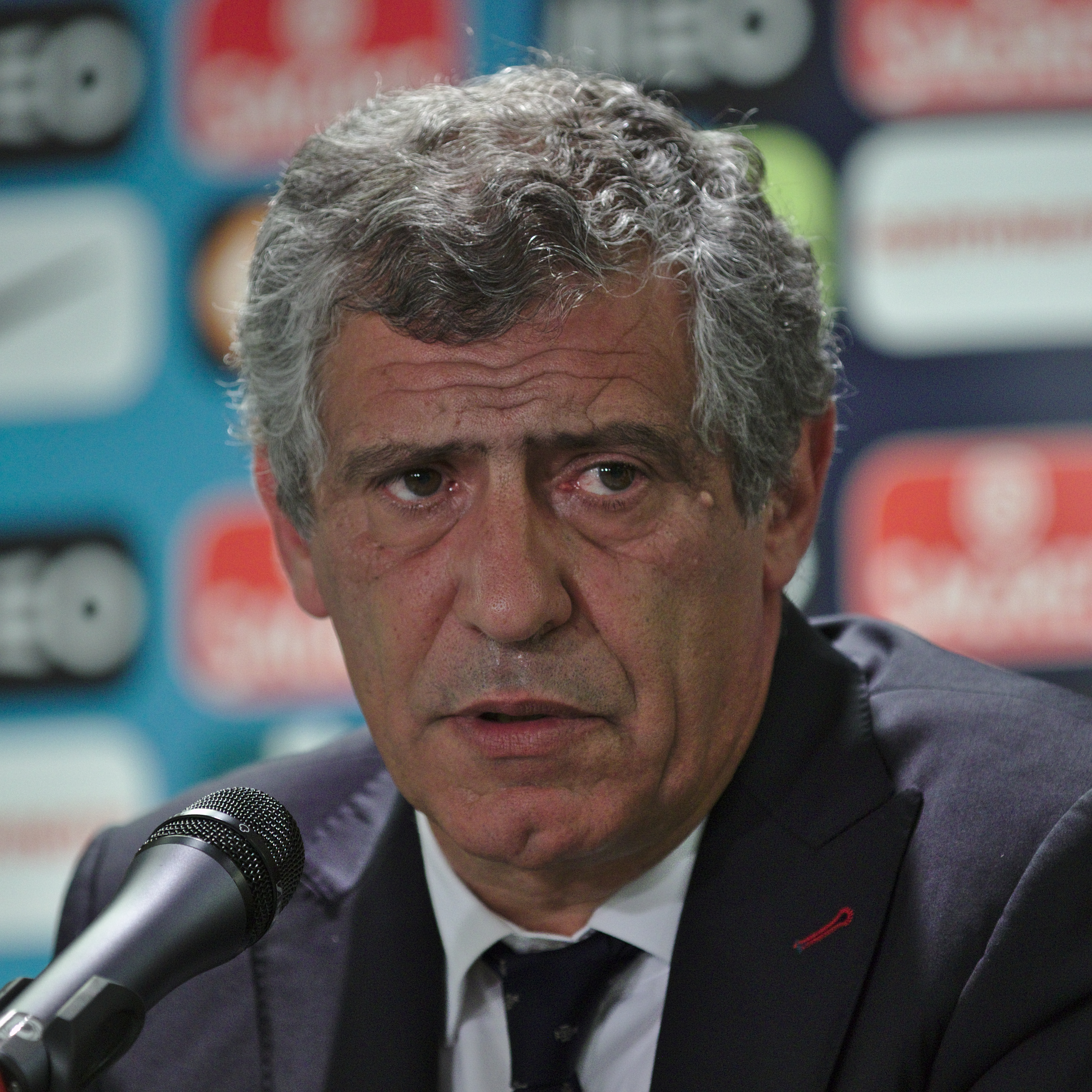
Fernando Santos winner of the 2001–02 Greek Cup

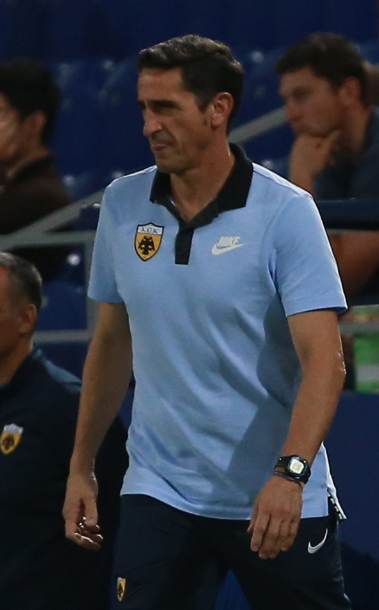
Manolo Jiménez 2017–18 Greek Super League champion and 2010–11 Greek Cup winner

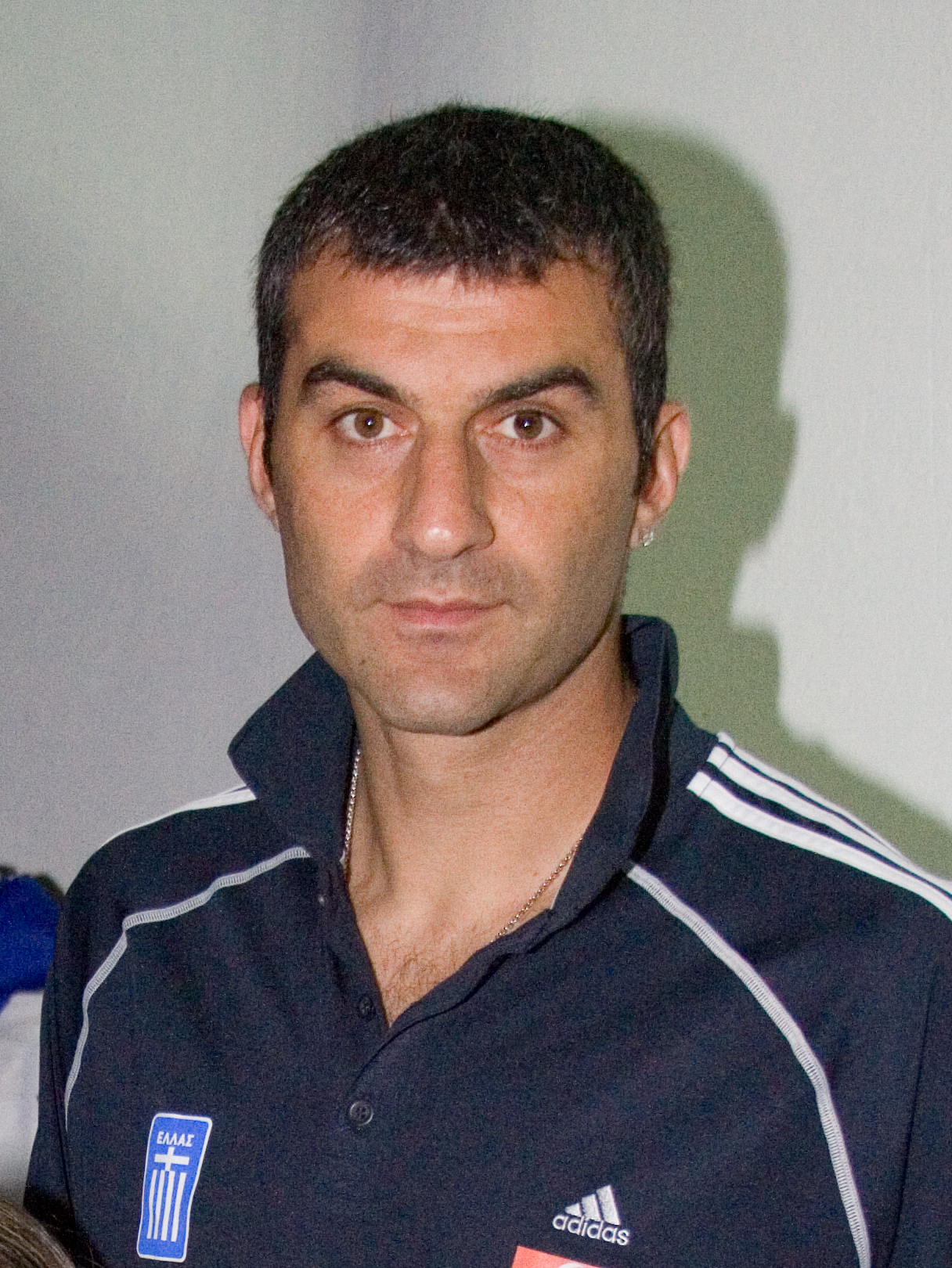
Traianos Dellas led the club to promotion to the Greek Super League

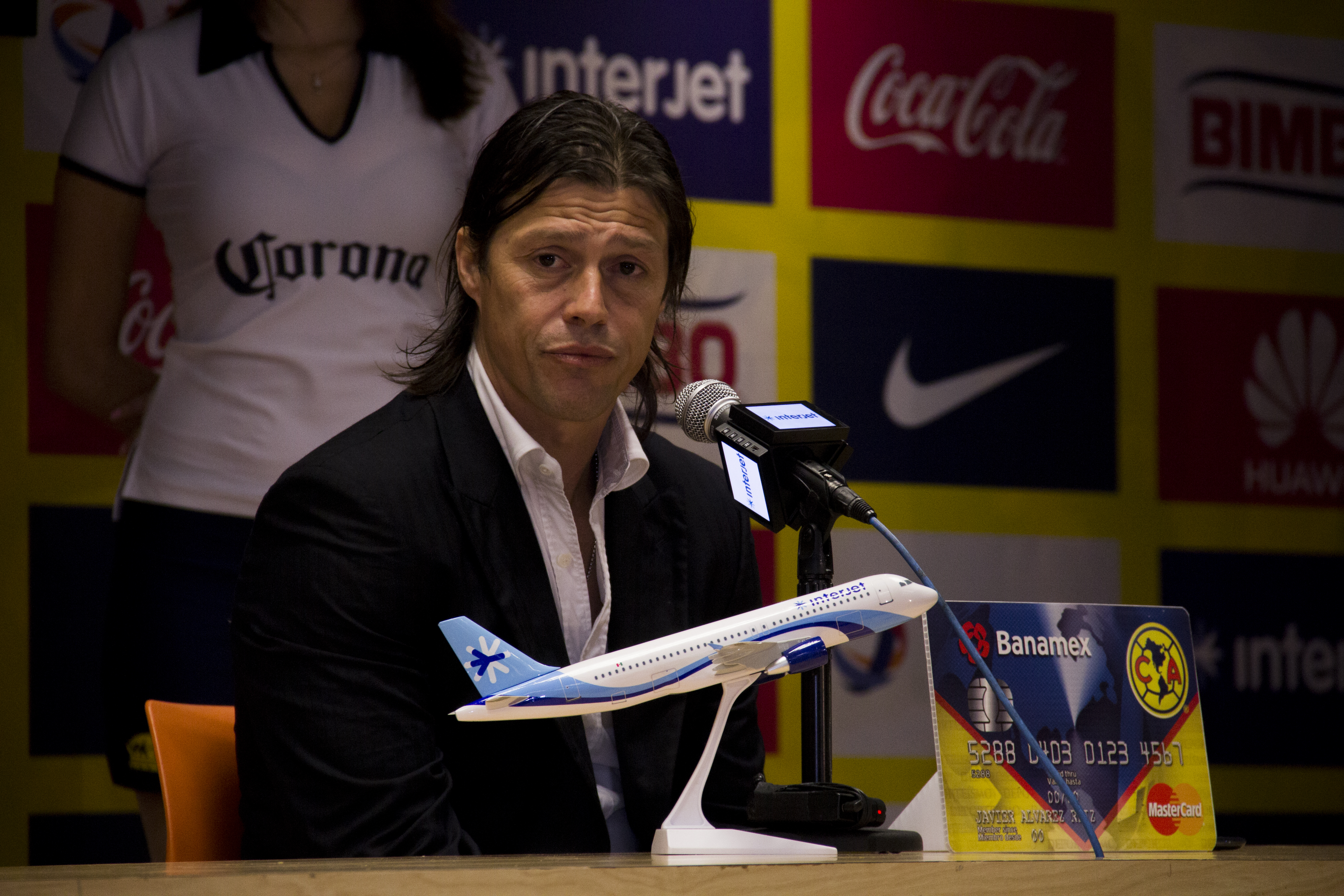
Matías Almeyda 2022–23 Greek Super League champion and 2022–23 Greek Cup winner

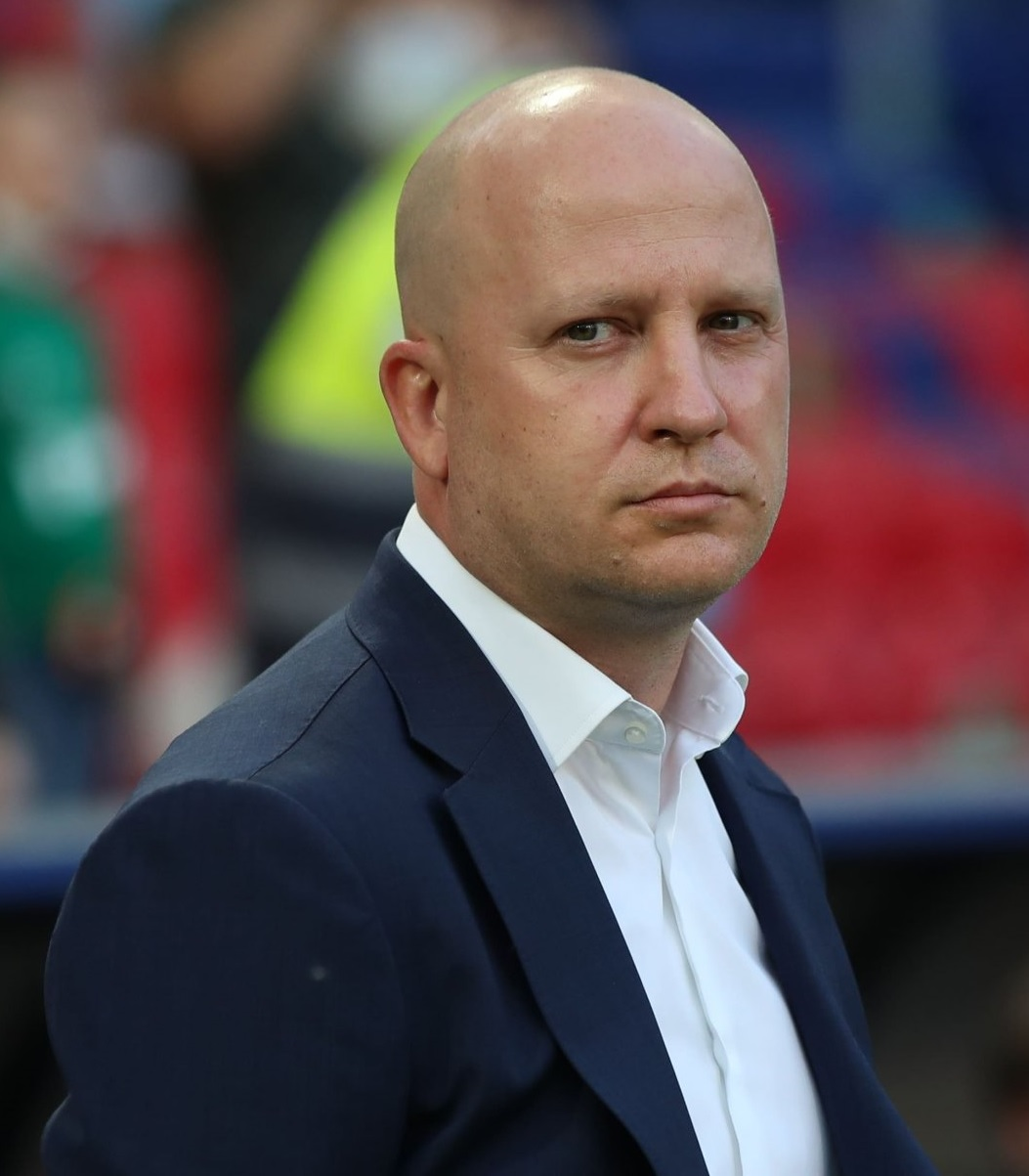
Marko Nikolić 2025–26 Greek Super League champion

Manager	From	To	Trophies
(Greece) Kostas Negrepontis	1933; 1937; 1944; 1955; 1958	1936; 1940; 1948; 1956; 1959	2 Greek Leagues; 1 Greek Cup
(England) Jack Beby	1948	1951	2 Greek Cups
(Italy) Mario Magnozzi	1951	1953	—
(Greece) Tryfon Tzanetis^{[A]}	1951; 1957; 1960; 1965	1951; 1958; 1962; 1966	1 Greek Cup
(Austria) Heinrich Müller	1963	1964	1 Greek Cup
(Hungary) Jenő Csaknády^{[A]}	1962; 1967	1963; 1968	2 Greek Leagues
(Socialist Federal Republic of Yugoslavia) Branko Stanković^{[A]}	1968	1973	1 Greek League
(Czechoslovakia) František Fadrhonc	1974	1977	—
(Socialist Federal Republic of Yugoslavia) Zlatko Čajkovski	1977; 1982	1978; 1982	1 Greek League; 1 Greek Cup
(Hungary) Ferenc Puskás	1978	1979	—
(Greece) Andreas Stamatiadis*	1977; 1979	1977; 1979	1 Greek League
(Austria) Helmut Senekowitsch	1983	1983	1 Greek Cup
(Greece) Giannis Pathiakakis	2000	2001	1 Greek Cup
(Portugal) Fernando Santos	2001; 2004	2002; 2006	1 Greek Cup
(Spain) Lorenzo Serra Ferrer	2006	2008	—
(Bosnia and Herzegovina) Dušan Bajević	1988; 2002; 2008	1996; 2004; 2010	4 Greek Leagues; 1 Greek Cup; 1 Greek League Cup; 1 Greek Super Cup
(Spain) Manolo Jiménez	2010; 2017	2011; 2018	1 Greek Cup; 1 Greek League
(Greece) Traianos Dellas	2013	2015	1 Football League 2; 1 Football League
(Greece) Stelios Manolas*	2015; 2016	2015; 2016	1 Greek Cup
(Argentina) Matías Almeyda	2022	2025	1 Greek League; 1 Greek Cup
(Serbia) Marko Nikolić	2025		1 Greek League

Key
* Served as caretaker manager.
† Served as caretaker manager before being appointed permanently.

Only competitive matches are counted. Wins, losses, and draws are results at the final whistle; the results of penalty shootouts are not counted.

== See also ==
- A.E.K. (sports club)
- AEK Athens B F.C.
- AEK Athens F.C. Academy
- History of AEK Athens F.C.
- List of AEK Athens F.C. seasons
- List of AEK Athens F.C. records and statistics
- List of AEK Athens F.C. managers
- AEK Athens F.C. in European football
- European Club Association

== Bibliography ==
- Κουσουνέλος, Γιώργος (1924). ΑΕΚ - Η ΥΠΕΡΟΜΑΔΑ (in Greek). Αθήνα, Ελλάδα: Σ. Φίλης.
- Μακρίδης, Παναγιώτης (1955). Η ΙΣΤΟΡΙΑ ΤΗΣ ΑΕΚ (in Greek). Αθήνα, Ελλάδα: Αθλητική Ηχώ.
- Σουβατζόγλου, Β.; Καλφόπουλος, Γ. (1979). Η αθλητική δράση των Ρωμιών της Πόλης 1896–1976 (in Greek). Αθήνα, Ελλάδα: Ισταμπούλ.
- Αλεξανδρής, Γ.Χ. (1996). Η Ιστορία της ΑΕΚ (in Greek). Αθήνα, Ελλάδα: Ιδιωτική Έκδοση Γ.Χ. Αλεξανδρής.
- Καραπάνος, Παναγιώτης (1999). Το αλφαβητάρι της ΑΕΚ: Όλα όσα πρέπει να ξέρεις και δεν σου έχουν πει για την ΑΕΚ (in Greek). Αθήνα, Ελλάδα: Εκδόσεις Δίαυλος. ISBN 9789605310660.
- Νόταρης, Σωτήρης Ι. (2002). ΑΕΚ, κλασικός αθλητισμός: Ο καρπός της αθλητικής παράδοσης της Πόλης στη σύγχρονη Αθήνα από το 1924 έως τις μέρες μας (in Greek). Αθήνα, Ελλάδα: Εκδόσεις Καλαβρία. ISBN 9780008606008.
- Φασούλας, Χρήστος; Κοντολέων, Δομήνικος (2007). Ο Κιτρινόμαυρος Δικέφαλος (in Greek). Αθήνα, Ελλάδα: Εκδόσεις Παπαδόπουλος. ISBN 9789604125586.
- Κατσαρός, Κωνσταντίνος (2008). Κώστας Νεστορίδης: Ο μάγος της μπάλας (in Greek). Αθήνα, Ελλάδα: Εκδόσεις Άγκυρα. ISBN 9789604226252.
- Ρόλλας, Νίκος; Μπίλιος, Γιάννης; Λαδόπουλος, Μιχάλης; Γούγας, Γιώργος; Βογιατζή, Έλενα; Αμερικάνου, Χριστίνα; Τριανταφύλλου, Σωτήρης (2009). ΑΕΚ: Για πάντα πρωταθλητές (in Greek). Αθήνα, Ελλάδα: Εκδόσεις Σκάι. ISBN 9789604820184.
- Κακίσης, Σωτήρης (2011). Ένωσις! (in Greek). Λευκωσία, Κύπρος: Εκδόσεις Αιγαίον. ISBN 9789963692774.
- Έρτσος, Γεράσιμος (2015). Στάδιο ΑΕΚ και η ιστορία του...από το 1928 μέχρι το 2015 (in Greek). Αθήνα, Ελλάδα: Ιδιωτική Έκδοση. ISBN 9789609374262.
- Συλλογικό έργο (2014). 90 ΧΡΟΝΙΑ, Η ΙΣΤΟΡΙΑ ΤΗΣ ΑΕΚ (in Greek). Αθήνα, Ελλάδα: Εκδοτικός Οίκος Α. Α. Λιβάνη. ISBN 9789601428024.
- Συλλογικό έργο (2017). Ποιος, ποιος, ποιος, ο μαύρος θεός (in Greek). Αθήνα, Ελλάδα: Εκδόσεις Ελληνοεκδοτική. ISBN 9789605631468.
- Αγγελίδης, Νικόλαος (2017). Όλες οι ΑΕΚ του κόσμου (in Greek). Αθήνα, Ελλάδα: Εκδόσεις Νότιος Άνεμος. ISBN 9789609511520.
- Γεωργάκης, Θεόδωρος (2021). Είναι διαφορετικό να είσαι ΑΕΚ (in Greek). Αθήνα, Ελλάδα: Όστρια Βιβλίο. ISBN 9789606047015.
- Παναγιωτακόπουλος, Παναγιώτης (2021). 1963–2021 Η ΕΥΡΩΠΑΪΚΗ ΙΣΤΟΡΙΑ ΤΗΣ Α.Ε.Κ. ΜΕΣΑ ΑΠΟ ΤΑ ΕΙΣΙΤΗΡΙΑ ΤΩΝ ΑΓΩΝΩΝ: το ταξίδι συνεχίζεται...!!! (in Greek). Αθήνα, Ελλάδα. ISBN 9786180028324.
- Παναγιωτακόπουλος, Παναγιώτης (2022). 1979–2003 ΤΟ ΤΑΞΙΔΙ ΣΥΝΕΧΙΖΕΤΑΙ...Νο2: Οι επίσημοι αγώνες της Α.Ε.Κ. στο Ναό μέσα από τα εισιτήρια των αγώνων (in Greek). Αθήνα, Ελλάδα. ISBN 9786180039931.
- Παναγιωτακόπουλος, Παναγιώτης (2023). 100 ΧΡΟΝΙΑ Α.Ε.Κ. – 100 ΣΤΙΓΜΕΣ ΔΟΞΑΣ μέσα από τα εισιτήρια των αγώνων: Το Ταξίδι Συνεχίζεται...!!! Νο3 (in Greek). Αθήνα, Ελλάδα. ISBN 9786180046366.
- Γασπαρινάτος, Γεράσιμος (2023). Μια ομάδα στον κόσμο αγαπώ! (in Greek). Αθήνα, Ελλάδα: One Team Εκδοτική. ISBN 9786188676800.
- Γασπαρινάτος, Γεράσιμος; Δημάτος, Ανδρέας (2024). 100 ΧΡΟΝΙΑ Α.Ε.Κ: Η ΙΣΤΟΡΙΑ ΤΗΣ Α.Ε.Κ. ΜΕΣΑ ΑΠΟ ΤΗΝ ΕΞΕΛΙΞΗ ΤΟΥ ΓΗΠΕΔΟΥ ΤΗΣ (in Greek). Αθήνα, Ελλάδα: Εκδόσεις Κάπα. ISBN 9789606283727.
- Μπαλτάς, Ανδρέας; Τσούμας, Θανάσης; Κατσάπης, Κώστας; Χαραλαμπίδης, Μενέλαος; Μακρής, Αλέξανδρος Ε.; Παπαθανασοπούλου, Κυριακή; Τζαχρήστα, Βασιλική; Χουμεριανός, Μανώλης (2024). ΟΨΕΙΣ ΤΗΣ ΚΟΙΝΩΝΙΚΗΣ ΙΣΤΟΡΙΑΣ ΤΗΣ ΑΕΚ (in Greek). Γλύφα Βαρθολομιού Ηλείας, Ελλάδα: Εκδόσεις Μπαλτά. ISBN 9786185658069.
