= 2002 Sport Club do Recife season =

Sport Recife
2002 season
- Chairman: Fernando Pessoa
- Manager: Mauro Fernandes; Heriberto da Cunha; Hélio dos Anjos
- Stadium: Ilha do Retiro
- Série B: 5th
- Pernambucano: 3rd
- Copa do Brasil: Second round
- Copa do Nordeste: First stage
- Top goalscorer: League: Gaúcho (6); All: Gaúcho (14)
Home colours	Away colours	Third colours

The 2002 season was Sport Recife's 98th season in the club's history. Sport competed in the Campeonato Pernambucano, Copa do Brasil, Copa do Nordeste and Série B.

== Statistics ==
=== Overall ===
Games played	64 (15 Copa do Nordeste, 4 Copa do Brasil, 18 Pernambucano, 27 Série B)
Games won	32 (6 Copa do Nordeste, 2 Copa do Brasil, 9 Pernambucano, 15 Série B)
Games drawn	13 (2 Copa do Nordeste, 1 Copa do Brasil, 4 Pernambucano, 6 Série B)
Games lost	19 (7 Copa do Nordeste, 1 Copa do Brasil, 5 Pernambucano, 6 Série B)
Goals scored	108
Goals conceded	79
Goal difference	+29
Best results (goal difference)	7–2 (H) v Botafogo–SP - Copa do Brasil - 2002.02.20
Worst result (goal difference)	0–5 (A) v Vitória - Copa do Nordeste - 2002.02.24
Top scorer	Gaúcho (14)

Source: Sport Recife official website

=== Goalscorers ===
Place	Pos.	Nat.	Name	Copa do Nordeste	Copa do Brasil	Campeonato Pernambucano	Série B	Total
1	DF	(Brazil)	Gaúcho	3	1	4	6	14
2	MF	(Brazil)	Cacá	3	0	3	4	10
2	MF	(Brazil)	Geraldo	4	0	6	0	10
2	FW	(Brazil)	Ricardinho	2	3	5	0	10
3	MF	(Brazil)	Nildo	0	0	6	3	9
4	FW	(Brazil)	Wellington Amorim	0	0	2	4	6
5		(Brazil)	Carlinhos	0	0	0	5	5
5	MF	(Brazil)	Cléber Santana	2	0	1	2	5
5	MF	(Brazil)	Djalma	2	0	0	3	5
6	DF	(Brazil)	Clécio	0	0	2	2	4
6	FW	(Brazil)	Fabinho	2	1	1	0	4
6		(Brazil)	Fabrício	0	0	0	4	4
6	DF	(Brazil)	Ronaldo	1	2	1	0	4
7	FW	(Brazil)	Vítor	2	1	0	0	3
8	FW	(Brazil)	Luiz Cláudio	1	1	0	0	2
8		(Brazil)	Reinaldo	0	0	0	2	2
9	MF	(Brazil)	Caçapa	1	0	0	0	1
9	MF	(Brazil)	Capitão	0	0	0	1	1
9		(Brazil)	Da Silva	1	0	0	0	1
9	MF	(Brazil)	Danilo Goiano	0	0	0	1	1
9		(Brazil)	Douglas	0	0	1	0	1
9	MF	(Brazil)	Fernando César	0	0	0	1	1
9	DF	(Brazil)	Juninho Goiano	0	0	0	1	1
9	DF	(Brazil)	Neguette	0	1	0	0	1
			Own goals	1	0	1	1	3
			Total	25	10	33	40	108

== Competitions ==
=== Copa do Nordeste ===
==== First stage ====
20 January 2002 1	Sport	1–0	Fluminense de Feira	Recife
(UTC-3)	Ronaldo			Stadium: Estádio Adelmar da Costa Carvalho (Ilha do Retiro)

27 January 2002 2	CSA	3–2	Sport	Maceió
(UTC-3)			Cacá; Fabinho	Stadium: Estádio Rei Pelé

30 January 2002 3	Sport	0–2	Bahia	Recife
(UTC-3)				Stadium: Estádio Adelmar da Costa Carvalho (Ilha do Retiro)

3 February 2002 4	Confiança	2–3	Sport	Aracaju
(UTC-3)			Caçapa; Vítor,	Stadium: Estádio Lourival Baptista (Batistão)

9 February 2002 5	América–RN	1–1	Sport	Natal
(UTC-3)			Ricardinho	Stadium: Estádio Dr. João Cláudio Vasconcelos Machado (Machadão)

16 February 2002 6	Sport	2–0	Treze	Recife
(UTC-3)	Geraldo; Fabinho			Stadium: Estádio Adelmar da Costa Carvalho (Ilha do Retiro)

24 February 2002 7	Vitória	5–0	Sport	Salvador
(UTC-3)				Stadium: Estádio Manoel Barradas (Barradão)

3 March 2002 8	Sport	1–2	Santa Cruz	Recife
(UTC-3)	Gaúcho			Stadium: Estádio Adelmar da Costa Carvalho (Ilha do Retiro)

10 March 2002 9	Fortaleza	4–3	Sport	Fortaleza
(UTC-3)			Gaúcho; Geraldo; Ricardinho	Stadium: Estádio Presidente Vargas

17 March 2002 10	Sport	2–2	CRB	Recife
(UTC-3)	Gaúcho; Geraldo			Stadium: Estádio Adelmar da Costa Carvalho (Ilha do Retiro)

20 March 2002 11	Náutico	0–1	Sport	Recife
(UTC-3)			Djalma	Stadium: Estádio Eládio de Barros Carvalho (Aflitos)

23 March 2002 12	Sport	4–1	Sergipe	Recife
(UTC-3)	Cléber Santana, Cacá; Djalma			Stadium: Estádio Adelmar da Costa Carvalho (Ilha do Retiro)

31 March 2002 13	Ceará	3–1	Sport	Fortaleza
(UTC-3)			Luiz Cláudio	Stadium: Estádio Presidente Vargas

7 April 2002 14	Sport	1–2	ABC	Recife
(UTC-3)	Geraldo			Stadium: Estádio Adelmar da Costa Carvalho (Ilha do Retiro)

14 April 2002 15	Botafogo–PB	0–3	Sport	João Pessoa
(UTC-3)			Cacá; Da Silva; Ronaldo (o.g.)	Stadium: Estádio José Américo de Almeida Filho (Almeidão)

==== Record ====
Final Position	Points	Matches	Wins	Draws	Losses	Goals For	Goals Away	Avg%
10th	20	15	6	2	7	25	27	44%

=== Copa do Brasil ===
==== First round ====
6 February 2002	Botafogo–SP	1–1	Sport	Ribeirão Preto
(UTC-3)			Vítor	Stadium: Estádio Santa Cruz

20 February 2002	Sport	7–2	Botafogo–SP	Recife
(UTC-3)	Ronaldo, Fabinho; Gaúcho; Ricardinho,,			Stadium: Estádio Adelmar da Costa Carvalho (Ilha do Retiro)

==== Second round ====
6 March 2002	Sport	2–1	Atlético Mineiro	Recife
(UTC-3)	Luiz Cláudio; Neguete			Stadium: Estádio Adelmar da Costa Carvalho (Ilha do Retiro)

13 March 2002	Atlético Mineiro	3–0	Sport	Belo Horizonte
(UTC-3)				Stadium: Estádio Governador Magalhães Pinto (Mineirão)

==== Record ====
Final Position	Points	Matches	Wins	Draws	Losses	Goals For	Goals Away	Avg%
18th	7	4	2	1	1	10	7	58%

=== Campeonato Pernambucano ===
==== First stage ====
17 April 2002 1	Sport	4–1	Ferroviário	Recife
(UTC-3)	Ronaldo; Ricardinho, Gaúcho			Stadium: Estádio Adelmar da Costa Carvalho (Ilha do Retiro)

24 April 2002 2	Porto	0–2	Sport	Caruaru
(UTC-3)			Douglas; Cacá

30 April 2002 3	Sport	1–1	Central	Recife
(UTC-3)	Gaúcho			Stadium: Estádio Adelmar da Costa Carvalho (Ilha do Retiro)

5 May 2002 4	Santa Cruz	3–2	Sport	Recife
(UTC-3)			Cacá; Geraldo	Stadium: Estádio Adelmar da Costa Carvalho (Ilha do Retiro)

8 May 2002 5	Petrolina	0–3	Sport	Petrolina
(UTC-3)			Geraldo; Cléber Santana; Ricardinho

12 May 2002 6	Sport	3–1	Recife	Recife
(UTC-3)	Nildo, Ricardinho			Stadium: Estádio Adelmar da Costa Carvalho (Ilha do Retiro)

15 May 2002 7	AGA	0–1	Sport	Garanhuns
(UTC-3)			Geraldo

19 May 2002 8	Sport	0–0	Náutico	Recife
(UTC-3)				Stadium: Estádio Adelmar da Costa Carvalho (Ilha do Retiro)

22 May 2002 9	Sport	1–1	Intercontinental	Recife
(UTC-3)	Wellington Amorim			Stadium: Estádio Adelmar da Costa Carvalho (Ilha do Retiro)

==== Second stage ====
26 May 2002 1	Ferroviário	2–2	Sport	Serra Talhada
(UTC-3)			Sérgio (o.g.); Fabinho

29 May 2002 2	Sport	2–0	Porto	Recife
(UTC-3)	Gaúcho; Geraldo			Stadium: Estádio Adelmar da Costa Carvalho (Ilha do Retiro)

2 June 2002 3	Central	2–1	Sport	Caruaru
(UTC-3)			Gaúcho

5 June 2002 4	Sport	1–2	Santa Cruz	Recife
(UTC-3)	Nildo			Stadium: Estádio Adelmar da Costa Carvalho (Ilha do Retiro)

9 June 2002 5	Sport	3–1	Petrolina	Recife
(UTC-3)	Wellington Amorim; Clécio; Ricardinho			Stadium: Estádio Adelmar da Costa Carvalho (Ilha do Retiro)

13 June 2002 6	Recife	1–2	Sport	Goiana
(UTC-3)			Nildo,

16 June 2002 7	Sport	3–1	AGA	Recife
(UTC-3)	Cacá; Geraldo,			Stadium: Estádio Adelmar da Costa Carvalho (Ilha do Retiro)

19 June 2002 8	Náutico	1–0	Sport	Recife
(UTC-3)				Stadium: Estádio Adelmar da Costa Carvalho (Ilha do Retiro)

23 June 2002 9	Intercontinental	4–2	Sport	Ipojuca
(UTC-3)			Nildo; Clécio

==== Record ====
Final Position	Points	Matches	Wins	Draws	Losses	Goals For	Goals Away	Avg%
3rd	31	18	9	4	5	33	21	57%

=== Série B ===
==== First stage ====
13 August 2002 1	Sport	1–0	Bragantino	Recife
(UTC-3)	Gaúcho			Stadium: Estádio Adelmar da Costa Carvalho (Ilha do Retiro)

17 August 2002 2	Londrina	0–0	Sport	Londrina
(UTC-3)				Stadium: Estádio Jacy Scaff (do Café)

20 August 2002 3	Joinville	2–3	Sport	Joinville
(UTC-3)			Gaúcho, Nildo	Stadium: Estádio Ernesto Schlemm Sobrinho

23 August 2002 4	Sport	1–0	Mogi Mirim	Recife
(UTC-3)	Juninho Goiano			Stadium: Estádio Adelmar da Costa Carvalho (Ilha do Retiro)

28 August 2002 5	Sport	2–1	Americano	Recife
(UTC-3)	Cléber Santana; Carlinhos			Stadium: Estádio Adelmar da Costa Carvalho (Ilha do Retiro)

31 August 2002 6	Anapolina	0–2	Sport	Anápolis
(UTC-3)			Fabrício; Reinaldo	Stadium: Estádio Jonas Duarte

3 September 2002 7	Caxias	1–0	Sport	Caxias do Sul
(UTC-3)				Stadium: Estádio Francisco Stédile (Centenário)

8 September 2002 8	Sport	3–0	Botafogo–SP	Recife
(UTC-3)	Cacá; Djalma; Reinaldo			Stadium: Estádio Adelmar da Costa Carvalho (Ilha do Retiro)

11 September 2002 9	Sport	2–1	Sampaio Corrêa	Recife
(UTC-3)	Cacá; Jivago (o.g.)			Stadium: Estádio Adelmar da Costa Carvalho (Ilha do Retiro)

14 September 2002 10	Santa Cruz	1–0	Sport	Recife
(UTC-3)				Stadium: Estádio José do Rego Maciel (Arruda)

17 September 2002 11	São Raimundo	1–0	Sport	Manaus
(UTC-4)				Stadium: Estádio Vivaldo Lima (Vivaldão)

20 September 2002 12	Sport	2–0	Avaí	Recife
(UTC-3)	Carlinhos; Djalma			Stadium: Estádio Adelmar da Costa Carvalho (Ilha do Retiro)

24 September 2002 13	Sport	4–0	Guarany de Sobral	Recife
(UTC-3)	Gaúcho; Carlinhos; Clécio; Cacá			Stadium: Estádio Adelmar da Costa Carvalho (Ilha do Retiro)

27 September 2002 14	União São João	1–2	Sport	Araras
(UTC-3)			Danilo Goiano; Fabrício	Stadium: Estádio Doutor Hermínio Ometto

1 October 2002 15	Remo	1–1	Sport	Belém
(UTC-3)			Wellington Amorim	Stadium: Estádio Evandro Almeida (Baenão)

5 October 2002 16	Sport	3–0	CRB	Recife
(UTC-3)	Carlinhos; Cacá; Fernando César			Stadium: Estádio Adelmar da Costa Carvalho (Ilha do Retiro)

8 October 2002 17	Ceará	0–0	Sport	Fortaleza
(UTC-3)				Stadium: Estádio Presidente Vargas

11 October 2002 18	América–MG	3–3	Sport	Belo Horizonte
(UTC-3)			Cléber Santana; Fabrício; Nildo	Stadium: Estádio Raimundo Sampaio (Independência)

15 October 2002 19	Sport	0–0	Vila Nova	Recife
(UTC-3)				Stadium: Estádio Adelmar da Costa Carvalho (Ilha do Retiro)

18 October 2002 20	Sport	3–2	Náutico	Recife
(UTC-3)	Carlinhos; Clécio; Wellington Amorim			Stadium: Estádio Adelmar da Costa Carvalho (Ilha do Retiro)

22 October 2002 21	XV de Piracicaba	1–0	Sport	Piracicaba
(UTC-3)				Stadium: Estádio Municipal Barão da Serra Negra

25 October 2002 22	Criciúma	5–1	Sport	Criciúma
(UTC-3)			Wellington Amorim	Stadium: Estádio Heriberto Hülse

6 November 2002 23	Sport	2–1	América–RN	Recife
(UTC-3)	Fabrício; Djalma			Stadium: Estádio Adelmar da Costa Carvalho (Ilha do Retiro)

9 November 2002 24	Sport	2–0	Fortaleza	Recife
(UTC-3)	Wellington Amorim; Gaúcho			Stadium: Estádio Adelmar da Costa Carvalho (Ilha do Retiro)

12 November 2002 25	Jundiaí	0–1	Sport	Jundiaí
(UTC-3)			Nildo	Stadium: Estádio Doutor Jayme Pinheiro de Ulhôa Cintra

==== Second stage ====
15 November 2002	Jundiaí	1–1	Sport	Jundiaí
(UTC-3)	Vágner Mancini 81'		Capitão 73'	Stadium: Estádio Doutor Jayme Pinheiro de Ulhôa Cintra

19 November 2002	Sport	1–2	Jundiaí	Recife
(UTC-3)	Gaúcho 90+3'		Taílson 46', 81'	Stadium: Estádio Adelmar da Costa Carvalho (Ilha do Retiro)

==== Record ====
Final Position	Points	Matches	Wins	Draws	Losses	Goals For	Goals Away	Avg%
5th	51	27	15	6	6	40	24	63%
