= 2010 Copa do Brasil =

Copa Kia do Brasil 2010

Tournament details
- Country: Brazil
- Dates: February 10 - August 4
- Teams: 64

Final positions
- Champions: (São Paulo (state)) Santos
- Runners-up: (Bahia) Vitória

Tournament statistics
- Matches played: 116
- Goals scored: 340 (2.93 per match)
- Top goal scorer: Neymar (11 goals)

Awards
- Best player: Ganso

The 2010 Copa do Brasil was the 22nd edition of the Copa do Brasil, starting on February 10 and ended on August 4. It was contested by 64 clubs, either qualified through their respective state championships (54) or by the CBF Rankings (10). Clubs that qualified for the 2010 Copa Libertadores did not take part because of scheduling conflicts.

== Format ==
The competition is a single elimination knockout tournament featuring two-legged ties. In the first two rounds, if the away team wins the first match by 2 or more goals, it progresses straight to the next round avoiding the second leg. The away goals rule is also used in the Copa do Brasil. The winner qualifies for the 2011 Copa Libertadores, which prevents a team from winning the Copa do Brasil twice in a row.

== Team information ==
=== Qualified by state championships and other competitions ===
54 spots in the tournament are allocated to all the 27 State federations to indicate either one, two or three clubs, depending on their status in CBF State ranking. Criteria may vary, but usually state federations indicate clubs with best records in the state championships or other special competitions organized by such institutions.

State	Team	City	Qualification method
Acre	Juventus	Rio Branco	2009 State Championship winners
Alagoas	ASA	Arapiraca	2009 State Championship winners
Alagoas	Corinthians Alagoano	Maceió	2009 State Championship runners-up
Amapá	São José	Macapá	2009 State Championship winners
Amazonas	América	Manaus	2009 State Championship winners
Amazonas	Nacional	Manaus	2009 State Championship runners-up
Bahia	Vitória	Salvador	2009 State Championship winners
Bahia	Bahia	Salvador	2009 State Championship runners-up
Ceará	Fortaleza	Fortaleza	2009 State Championship winners
Ceará	Ceará	Fortaleza	2009 State Championship runners-up
Distrito Federal (Brazil)	Brasiliense	Brasília	2009 State Championship winners
Distrito Federal (Brazil)	Brasília	Brasília	2009 State Championship runners-up
Espírito Santo	São Mateus	São Mateus	2009 State Championship winners
Espírito Santo	Vitória	Vitória	2009 Copa Espírito Santo winners
Goiás	Goiás	Goiânia	2009 State Championship winners
Goiás	Atlético Goianiense	Goiânia	2009 State Championship runners-up
Maranhão	JV Lideral	Imperatriz	2009 State Championship winners
Maranhão	Sampaio Corrêa	São Luís	2009 Taça Cidade de São Luís winners
Mato Grosso	Luverdense	Lucas do Rio Verde	2009 State Championship winners
Mato Grosso	Araguaia	Alto Araguaia	2009 State Championship runners-up
Mato Grosso do Sul	Naviraiense	Naviraí	2009 State Championship winners
Mato Grosso do Sul	Ivinhema	Ivinhema	2009 State Championship runners-up
Minas Gerais	Atlético Mineiro	Belo Horizonte	2009 State Championship runners-up
Minas Gerais	Ituiutaba	Ituiutaba	2009 State Championship 3rd place
Minas Gerais	Uberaba	Uberaba	2009 Taça Minas Gerais winners
Pará	Paysandu	Belém	2009 State Championship winners
Pará	São Raimundo	Santarém	2009 State Championship runners-up
Paraíba	Sousa	Sousa	2009 State Championship winners
Paraíba	Treze	Campina Grande	2009 Copa Paraiba winners
Paraná	Atlético Paranaense	Curitiba	2009 State Championship winners
Paraná	Corinthians Paranaense	São José dos Pinhais	2009 State Championship runners-up
Paraná	Londrina	Londrina	2008 Copa Paraná winners
Pernambuco	Sport Recife	Recife	2009 State Championship winners
Pernambuco	Náutico	Recife	2009 State Championship runners-up
Piauí	Flamengo	Teresina	2009 State Championship winners
Piauí	Picos	Picos	2009 Copa Piauí runners-up
Rio de Janeiro	Botafogo	Rio de Janeiro	2009 State Championship runners-up
Rio de Janeiro	Vasco da Gama	Rio de Janeiro	2009 State Championship third place
Rio de Janeiro	Tigres do Brasil	Duque de Caxias	2009 Copa Rio winners
Rio Grande do Norte	ASSU	Assú	2009 State Championship winners
Rio Grande do Norte	Potyguar Seridoense	Currais Novos	2009 State Championship runners-up
Rio Grande do Sul	Grêmio	Porto Alegre	2009 State Championship runners-up
Rio Grande do Sul	Ypiranga	Erechim	2009 State Championship third place
Rio Grande do Sul	Cerâmica	Gravataí	2008 Copa FGF runners-up
Rondônia	Vilhena	Vilhena	2009 Championship winners
Roraima	Atlético Roraima	Boa Vista	2009 State Championship winners
São Paulo	Santos	Santos	2009 State Championship runners-up
São Paulo	Palmeiras	São Paulo	2009 State Championship third place
São Paulo	Votoraty	Votorantim	2009 Copa Paulista winners
Santa Catarina	Avaí	Florianópolis	2009 State Championship winners
Santa Catarina	Chapecoense	Chapecó	2009 State Championship runners-up
Sergipe	Confiança	Aracaju	2009 State Championship winners
Sergipe	São Domingos	São Domingos	2009 Copa Governo de Sergipe winners
Tocantins	Araguaína	Araguaína	2009 State Championship winners

=== Qualified by CBF club ranking ===
Ten spots are reserved for the top 10 clubs in CBF club ranking, excluding those qualified by state competitions and clubs playing in 2010 Copa Libertadores.

Pos	Team	City	State	Points
11	Fluminense	Rio de Janeiro	Rio de Janeiro	1,658
14	Coritiba	Curitiba	Paraná	1,473
15	Guarani	Campinas	São Paulo	1,470
17	Portuguesa	São Paulo	São Paulo	1,366
22	Santa Cruz	Recife	Pernambuco	1,136
23	Paraná	Curitiba	Paraná	1,044
24	Ponte Preta	Campinas	São Paulo	1,038
26	Juventude	Caxias do Sul	Rio Grande do Sul	865
27	Remo	Belém	Pará	852
29	América (RN)	Natal	Rio Grande do Norte	703

== Brackets ==
Teams that play in their home stadium in the first leg are marked with †.

=== Section 1 ===
First Round
(Rio de Janeiro (state)) Vasco da Gama	2	0	2
(Paraíba) Sousa †	1	0	1
(Amazonas (Brazilian state)) Nacional	0	2	2
(Alagoas) ASA † (a)	0	2	2
Ceará	5	-	5
(Piauí) Picos †	0	-	0
(Rio Grande do Sul) Juventude	0	0	0
(Paraná (state)) Corinthians Paranaense †	1	1	2
Goiás	3	0	3
(Minas Gerais) Ituiutaba †	2	0	2
(Rio Grande do Norte) América	1	0	1
(Amapá) São José †	1	1	2
(Bahia) Vitória	1	4	5
(Alagoas) Corinthians Alagoano †	3	0	3
(Pernambuco) Náutico	1	3	4
(Mato Grosso do Sul) Ivinhema †	1	1	2

Second Round
(Rio de Janeiro (state)) Vasco da Gama	1	3	4
(Alagoas) ASA †	1	1	2
Ceará	1	1	2
(Paraná (state)) Corinthians Paranaense †	2	1	3
Goiás	1	7	8
(Amapá) São José †	0	0	0
(Bahia) Vitória	1	5	6
(Pernambuco) Náutico †	0	0	0

Round of 16
(Rio de Janeiro (state)) Vasco da Gama	1	2	3
(Paraná (state)) Corinthians Paranaense †	0	1	1
Goiás	0	2	2
(Bahia) Vitória †	4	2	6

Quarterfinals
(Rio de Janeiro (state)) Vasco da Gama	0	3	3
(Bahia) Vitória † (a)	2	1	3

=== Section 2 ===
First Round
(Rio de Janeiro (state)) Fluminense	1	2	3
(Sergipe) Confiança †	1	0	1
(Paraná (state)) Londrina	0	0	0
(Minas Gerais) Uberaba †	1	2	3
(São Paulo (state)) Portuguesa	7	-	7
Atlético Roraima †	0	-	0
(São Paulo (state)) Ponte Preta	0	4	4
(Maranhão) JV Lideral †	0	0	0
(Rio Grande do Sul) Grêmio	3	-	3
(Mato Grosso) Araguaia †	1	-	1
(Paraíba) Treze	0	2	2
(São Paulo (state)) Votoraty †	4	1	5
(Paraná (state)) Coritiba	1	1	2
(Mato Grosso) Luverdense †	0	0	0
(Santa Catarina (state)) Avaí	3	-	3
(Rio Grande do Sul) Ypiranga †	0	-	0

Second Round
(Rio de Janeiro (state)) Fluminense	2	-	2
(Minas Gerais) Uberaba †	0	-	0
(São Paulo (state)) Portuguesa	1	2	3
(São Paulo (state)) Ponte Preta †	1	1	2
(Rio Grande do Sul) Grêmio	1	3	4
(São Paulo (state)) Votoraty †	0	0	0
(Paraná (state)) Coritiba	1	0	1
(Santa Catarina (state)) Avaí †	1	1	2

Round of 16
(Rio de Janeiro (state)) Fluminense	1	3	4
(São Paulo (state)) Portuguesa †	0	2	2
(Rio Grande do Sul) Grêmio †	3	2	5
(Santa Catarina (state)) Avaí	1	3	4

Quarterfinals
(Rio de Janeiro (state)) Fluminense †	2	0	2
(Rio Grande do Sul) Grêmio	3	2	5

=== Section 3 ===
First Round
(Rio de Janeiro (state)) Botafogo	0	4	4
(Pará) São Raimundo^{[a]} †	1	3	4
(Pernambuco) Santa Cruz	1	3	4
(Amazonas (Brazilian state)) América †	0	0	0
Bahia	2	-	2
(Espírito Santo) Vitória †	0	-	0
(Goiás) Atlético Goianiense	3	-	3
(Rio Grande do Norte) ASSU †	0	-	0
(São Paulo (state)) Palmeiras	1	4	5
(Piauí) Flamengo †	0	0	0
(Pará) Paysandu	0	3	3
(Rio Grande do Norte) Potyguar Seridoense †	0	1	1
(Paraná (state)) Atlético Paranaense	2	4	6
(Rondônia) Vilhena †	2	0	2
(Maranhão) Sampaio Corrêa	1	2	3
(Sergipe) São Domingos †	1	1	2

Second Round
(Rio de Janeiro (state)) Botafogo	1	2	3
(Pernambuco) Santa Cruz † (a)	0	3	3
Bahia	0	1	1
(Goiás) Atlético Goianiense †	2	0	2
(São Paulo (state)) Palmeiras	2	1	3
(Pará) Paysandu †	1	0	1
(Paraná (state)) Atlético Paranaense	1	2	3
(Maranhão) Sampaio Corrêa †	1	0	1

Round of 16
(Pernambuco) Santa Cruz †	1	0	1
(Goiás) Atlético Goianiense	2	2	4
(São Paulo (state)) Palmeiras †	1	1	2
(Paraná (state)) Atlético Paranaense	0	1	1

Quarterfinals
(Goiás) Atlético Goianiense (p)	0	1	1 (2)
(São Paulo (state)) Palmeiras †	1	0	1 (1)

^[a] São Raimundo was penalized 3 points due to player irregular registration.

=== Section 4 ===
First Round
(São Paulo (state)) Santos	1	10	11
(Mato Grosso do Sul) Naviraiense †	0	0	0
(Pará) Remo	2	4	6
(Espírito Santo) São Mateus †	1	1	2
(São Paulo (state)) Guarani	1	2	3
(Tocantins) Araguaína †	0	1	1
(Ceará) Fortaleza	2	3	5
(Rio de Janeiro (state)) Tigres do Brasil †	2	2	4
(Minas Gerais) Atlético Mineiro	7	-	7
(Acre (state)) Juventus †	0	-	0
(Federal District (Brazil)) Brasiliense	0	2	2
(Santa Catarina (state)) Chapecoense †	3	1	4
(Pernambuco) Sport Recife	4	-	4
(Federal District (Brazil)) Brasília †	2	-	2
(Paraná (state)) Paraná	1	6	7
(Rio Grande do Sul) Cerâmica †	1	1	2

Second Round
(São Paulo (state)) Santos	4	-	4
(Pará) Remo †	0	-	0
(São Paulo (state)) Guarani (p)	0	2	2 (4)
(Ceará) Fortaleza †	2	0	2 (3)
(Minas Gerais) Atlético Mineiro	0	6	6
(Santa Catarina (state)) Chapecoense †	1	0	1
(Pernambuco) Sport Recife	1	1	2
(Paraná (state)) Paraná †	1	0	1

Round of 16
(São Paulo (state)) Santos	8	2	10
(São Paulo (state)) Guarani †	1	3	4
(Minas Gerais) Atlético Mineiro	1	2	3
(Pernambuco) Sport Recife †	0	0	0

Quarterfinals
(São Paulo (state)) Santos	2	3	5
(Minas Gerais) Atlético Mineiro †	3	1	4

=== Final phase ===
Semifinals
(Bahia) Vitória	0	4	4
(Goiás) Atlético Goianiense †	1	0	1
(Rio Grande do Sul) Grêmio †	4	1	5
(São Paulo (state)) Santos	3	3	6

Final
(Bahia) Vitória †	0	2	2
(São Paulo (state)) Santos	2	1	3

Copa do Brasil
2010 Champion

Santos
1st Title
