= Miltos Ieremiadis =

Greek footballer 1905–1972

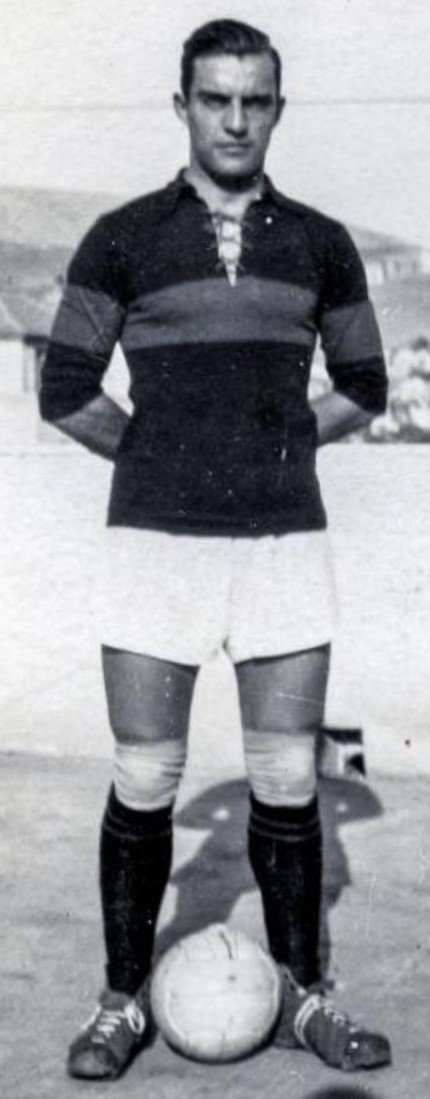
- Miltos Ieremiadis with AEK Athens

Personal information
- Full name: Miltiadis Ieremiadis
- Date of birth: 1905
- Place of birth: Constantinople, Ottoman Empire
- Date of death: July 1972 (aged 66–67)
- Position: Defender

Youth career
- 1922: Iraklis Tatavla

Senior career*
Years	Team	Apps	(Gls)
1923–1924	Apollon Athens	0	(0)
1924–1932	AEK Athens	8	(0)
Total		8	(0)
- * Club domestic league appearances and goals

Miltos Ieremiadis (Greek: Μίλτος Ιερεμιάδης; 1905 – 1972) was a Greek footballer who played as a defender. He was an important figure to AEK Athens, with a multifaceted contribution to the club, being one of their founders, a member of the first board of directors and a footballer.

== Club career ==
=== Early years ===
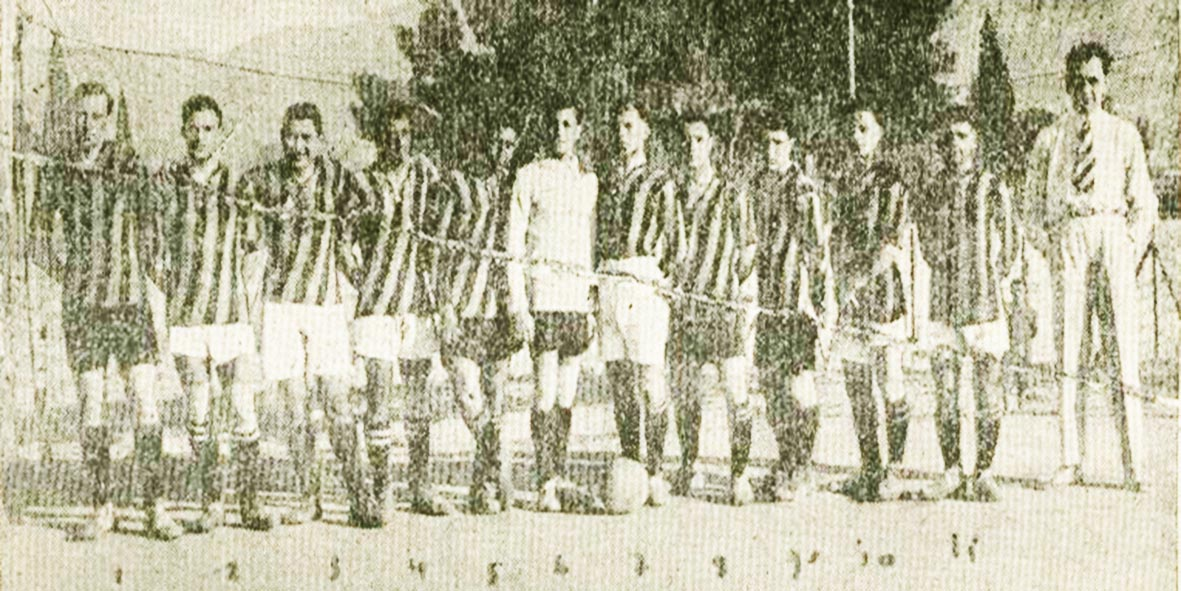
AEK Athens' squad in 1924.

Ieremiadis was born in Constantinople in 1905 and was the son of a bourgeois family. His father Periklis was a shoe merchant and maintained a shop on the main street of Pera, while he was among the suppliers of women to the sultan's harem. Ieremiadis was a graduate of the Hellenic-French Lyceum and from an early age showed an inclination towards sports. He became a track and field athlete at Iraklis Tatavla, where he also made his first steps as a footballer, playing as a central defender. With the ongoing Greco-Turkish War he moved to Athens in June 1922, while the rest of his family remained in Constantinople until 1927.

After settling in the city, he joined Apollon Athens in 1923 and competed in that season's AFCA league. However, in April 1924, when the idea of the establishment of a sports club by the Constantinopolitan residents of Athens and Piraeus was born, Ieremiadis became one of its initiators. Thus, he emerged as one of the 42 founders of Athlitikí Énosis Konstantinoupόleos (Athletic Union of Constantinople, Greek: Αθλητική Ένωσις Κωνσταντινουπόλεως), a member of their first board of directors of the club and one of their first football players.

=== AEK Athens ===
Ieremiadis became one of the main central defenders of AEK Athens, forming a great partnership with Themos Asderis, for the first 5 years of the club's excistance. In their first season, AEK claimed the AFCA league, losing the title to Panathinaikos in the final. By the late 1920s, he was the team's captain. On 8 November 1931 in the first Greek Cup final in the history of the institution, they defeated Aris by 5–3 at Leoforos Alexandras Stadium. Despite not completing in the match, as the captain, he became the first player in the history of AEK to lift a trophy. He played for the yellow-blacks until the end of that season, when in 1932 he retired as a footballer.

== Death ==
Ieremiadis died in July 1972, with his funeral taking place on the 16 of the month.

== Honours ==
AEK Athens

- Greek Cup: 1931–32
