= Themos Asderis =

Greek footballer and manager (1900–1975)

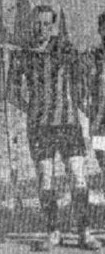
- Asderis with AEK Athens in 1924.

Personal information
- Full name: Themistoklis Asderis
- Date of birth: 1900
- Place of birth: Constantinople, Ottoman Empire
- Date of death: 21 March 1975 (aged 74–75)
- Place of death: Pangrati, Athens, Greece
- Position: Defender

Youth career
- Enosis Tatavla

Senior career*
Years	Team	Apps	(Gls)
1918–1923	Pera Club		
1924–1930	AEK Athens	0	(0)

Managerial career
- 1930–1931: Asteras Athens
- 1932–1933: AEK Athens
- 1933–1934: AEK Athens (assistant)
- 1936–1937: AEK Athens
- 1939–1940: Ethnikos Piraeus
- 1943–1944: Panathinaikos
- 1945–1947: Olympiacos
- 1950–1951: Asteras Athens
- * Club domestic league appearances and goals

Themos Asderis (Greek: Θέμος Ασδέρης; 1900 – 21 March 1975) was a Greek footballer who played as a defender in the 1920s and a later manager. He was considered a pioneer for the Greek football and he was one of the main founders of Pera Club and AEK Athens.

== Club career ==
=== Early years ===
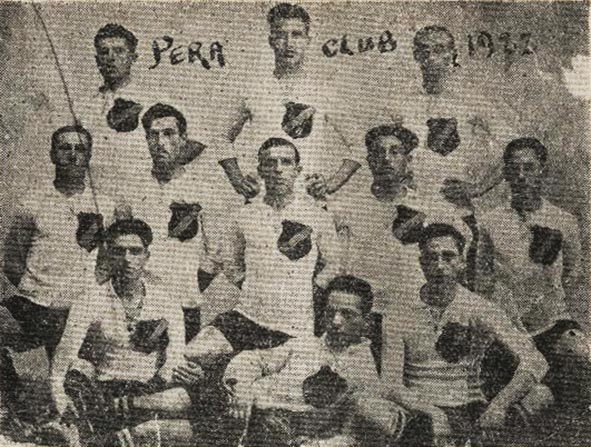
Players of Pera Club.

Born in Constantinople in 1900 Asderis started playing football from a young age, at the only clubs that had a football department at the time, Enosis Tataovla and later Pera Club. The black July of 1922 struck the Hellenism at Asia Minor and thousands of Greeks were forced to flee to Greece. Most of them managed to reach Athens and the 22-year-old Asderis was among them. Struck by misfortune, they soon sought the daily life of the city and two years after the war, they tried to play football in a poor, wounded and suspicious towards the refugees Greece. Some of those people, in a small place in the offices of the Young Men's Christian Brotherhood of Athens in the center of city, that were housed on Mitropoleos Street, decided to resurrect the Megali Idea, that was born in Constantinople and light the flame that was burning after their drama in 1922 and thus Athlitikí Énosis Konstantinoupόleos (Athletic Union of Constantinople, Greek: Αθλητική Ένωσις Κωνσταντινουπόλεως) were created.

=== AEK Athens ===
Before two months had passed, the newly established AEK Athens were staffed by an overwhelming majority of Constantinopolitan footballers. Asderis who was one of them, competed as their right and central defender in a 2–3–5 formation with his small and fast posture. He formed a formidable duo with Miltos Ieremiadis in the team's defense, for the first 5 seasons of the club's excistance. In those years, football was highly amateur, there was not a Football Federation in Greece and AEK were training in the open field next to Temple of Olympian Zeus. Asderis had already reached the age of 28 when AEK informally acquired their home ground at Nea Filadelfeia in 1928 and managed to compete at the soil of Filadelfeia, before retiring as a footballer.

== Managerial career ==
In 1930 Asderis started his career as a referee almost immediately after his retirement as a footballer and refereed matches in both Athens and Thessaloniki for a season, but with meager results. He, alongside Sotiris Asprogerakas and the Hungarian former manager of AEK, József Schweng, were among the few pre-war referees in Greek football. He also became the manager of Asteras Athens.

Asderis was one of the few people who had contact with football and quickly returned to AEK, taking charge of the technical leadership of the club, after the departure of Emil Rauchmaul. He remained at the bench of AEK until 1933 and continued as an assistant of Kostas Negrepontis in a period of decline for the club. After a renewal in their roster and with the promotion of players from their academy, which was the first in Greece, such as Kleanthis Maropoulos, Tryfon Tzanetis and Michalis Delavinias, AEK were ready to start their domestic domination. In 1937, AEK did not qualify for the Panhellenic Championship and thus they decided to return to their roots. They traveled to Istanbul in an intense emotional charge and participated in mini tournaments alongside Güneş and Fenerbahçe. They lost in the first match to the Turkish champions by 2–1, but they won Fenerbahçe 3–2. The club was ready for claiming titles which was eventually proved, since they won the first domestic double in Greek football in 1939. The following season was the last appearance of Asderis on the bench of AEK, again as an intermediate link in the tenure of Negrepontis. AEK won the championship again and looked to the future with optimism, since their generation of players was unique and won their opponents with great ease. He continued at the bench of Ethnikos Piraeus. Unfortunately, the World War II came, with the Greco-Italian War and football was no longer priority.

Asderis spent a period at the bench of Panathinaikos, where he helped them stand alongside the other Constantinopolitan and founding member of AEK, Fokionas Dimitriadis, during the difficult years of the Occupation. With the release of Greece and the restart of the national football championships, came the call from Olympiacos. Asderis became the first manager in the history of Greek football to work in all the clubs of the big three (followed by Helmut Senekowitsch and Jacek Gmoch). At Olympiacos being more mature than ever, he won the championship, as well as the Cup in 1947. Asderis was also part of the technical staff during three of the four spells of Negrepontis on the bench of Greece. In 1951 and at the age of 50, the Asderis retired from active role, having done everything in football as a footballer, a manager and a referee. He had written his name in the history of both AEK Athens and Olympiacos with a domestic double.

== Personal life ==
Asderis had a wife name Marika who was an agent of Panathinaikos. He ran a book and stationery shop with a lottery agency in Pangrati. On 21 March 1975, Asderis collapsed and died on the pavement on his way home from his shop.

== Honours ==
=== Player ===
Pera Club

- Turkish Championship: 1922

=== Manager ===
Olympiacos

- Panhellenic Championship: 1946–47
- Greek Cup: 1946–47
- Piraeus FCA Championship: 1946, 1947
