= 1931 Greek Football Cup final =

1931 Greek Cup final
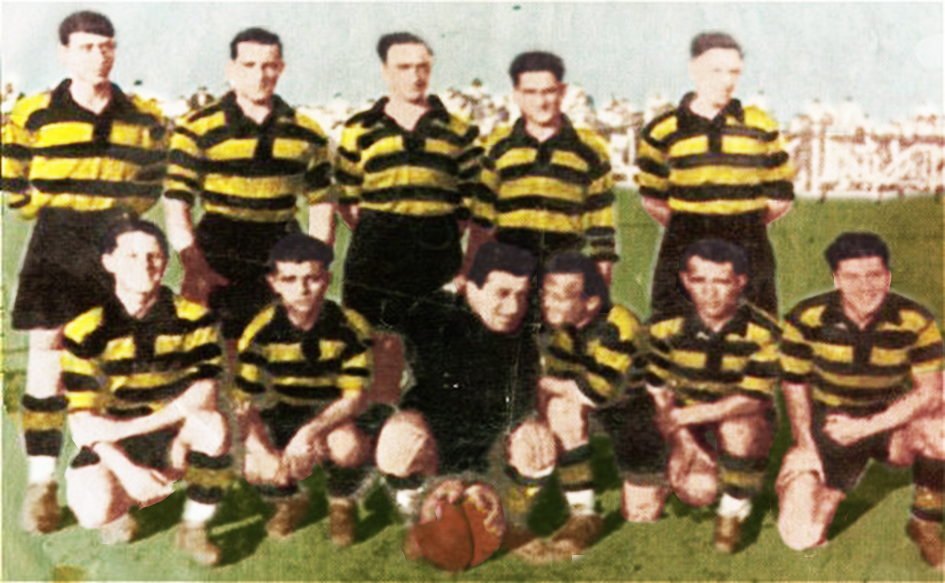
- AEK Athens' squad in the final
- Event: 1931–32 Greek Football Cup
| AEK Athens | Aris |
| 5 | 3 |
- Date: 8 November 1931
- Venue: Leoforos Alexandras Stadium, Ampelokipoi, Athens
- Referee: Sotiris Asprogerakas (Athens)
- Attendance: 10,000

The 1932 Greek Cup final was the inaugural final of the Greek Cup. The match took place on 8 November 1931 at Leoforos Alexandras Stadium. The contesting teams were AEK Athens and Aris. The eight goals that were scored in the match marked a goal-scoring record for a Cup final. AEK Athens with the conquest of the title became the first club to ever win the trophy and simultaneously deprived Aris the chance to become the first club to achieve the domestic double, since they emerged as champions at the end of the season. This was the last title for the star player of AEK Athens, Kostas Negrepontis, who retired afterwards. Nikos Kitsos of Aris holds the record for scoring a hat-trick in a lost Cup final.

== Venue ==
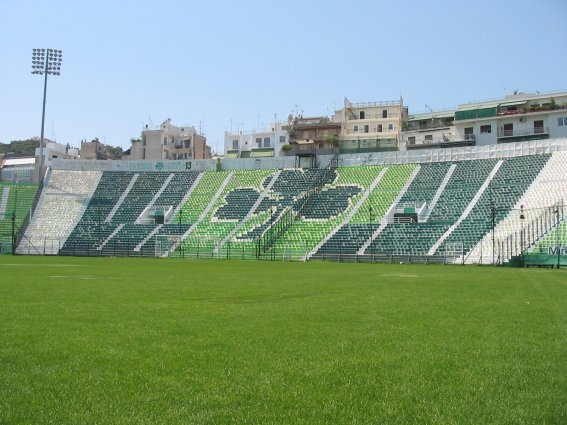
Leoforos Alexandras Stadium.

Leoforos Alexandras Stadium was built in 1922. The stadium is used as a venue for Panathinaikos and Greece. Its current capacity is 30,000.

== Route to the final ==
| AEK Athens | | Round | Aris | |
|---|---|---|---|---|
| Opponent | Result | | Opponent | Result |
| Piraikos Neo Faliro | 2–0 (H) | Round of 16 | Bye | |
| Ethnikos Piraeus | 4–0 (H) | Quarter-finals | Panathinaikos | 7–2 (H) |
| PAOK | 2–1 (H) | Semi-finals | Apollon Athens | 3–2 (A) |

== Match ==
=== Details ===
8 November 1931
14:30 EET

| AEK Athens | 5–3 | Aris |
|---|---|---|
| Iliaskos 5'; Baltas 8', 65'; Oikonomou 70' (o.g.); Negrepontis 78' | Report | Kitsos 40', 43', 80' |

Leoforos Alexandras Stadium, Athens
Attendance: 10,000
Referee: Sotiris Asprogerakas (Athens)

| AEK Athens | Aris |

| GK | (Greece) Giorgos Giamalis |
| DF | (Greece) Robert Mallios Galić |
| DF | (Greece) Georgios Daispangos |
| MF | (Greece) Christos Argyropoulos |
| MF | (Greece) Stefanos Konstantinidis |
| MF | (Greece) Patroklos Chatzipantelis |
| FW | (Greece) Kostas Negrepontis |
| FW | (Greece) Nikos Baltas |
| FW | (Greece) Antonis Tziralidis |
| FW | (Greece) Ilias Iliaskos |
| FW | (Greece) Sotiris Tziralidis |
Manager:
(Hungary) Emil Rauchmaul

| GK | (Greece) Nikos Karantzos |
| DF | (Greece) Kostas Vikelidis |
| DF | (Greece) Alekos Oikonomou |
| MF | (Greece) Panagiotis Katsaounis |
| MF | (Greece) Daniil Danelian |
| MF | (Greece) Nikiforos Vikelidis |
| FW | (Greece) Iordanis Vogdanou |
| FW | (Greece) Nikolaos Angelakis |
| FW | (Greece) Nikos Kitsos |
| FW | (Greece) Kostas Kalogiannis |
| FW | (Greece) Argyris Argyriadis |
Manager:
(Czechoslovakia) De Valer

Match rules

- 90 minutes
- 30 minutes of extra time if necessary
- Replay match if scores still level

== Photo Gallery ==
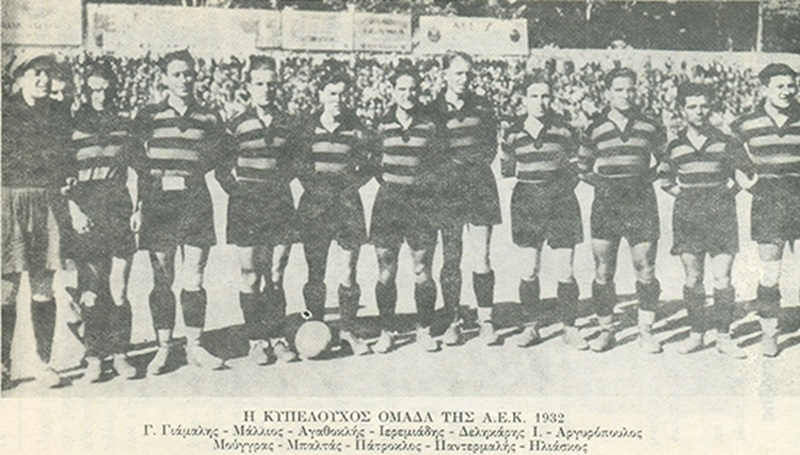
AEK Athens' squad

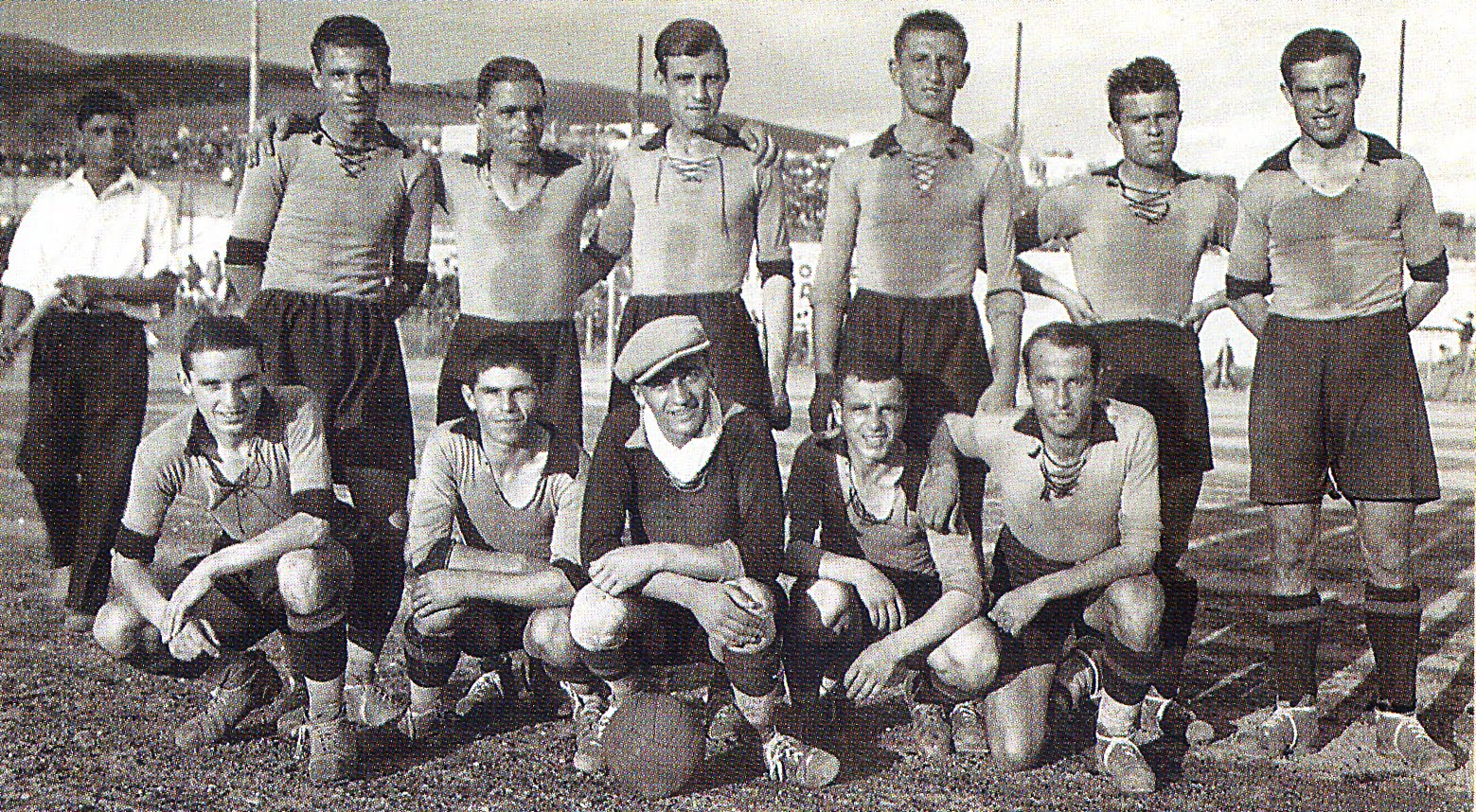
Aris' squad

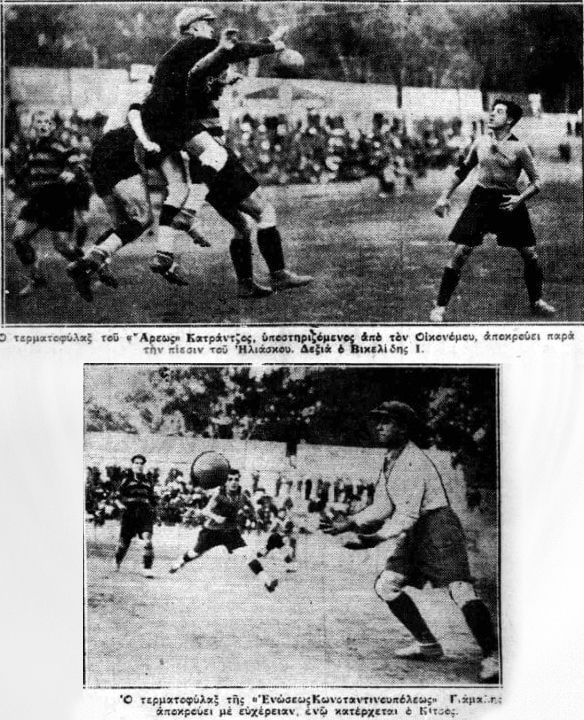
Highlights from the final

== See also ==
- 1931–32 Greek Football Cup
