= 2012 Campeonato Sergipano =

Campeonato Sergipano - Série A1
- Season: 2012
- Matches: 104
- Goals: 228 (2.19 per match)
- Top goalscorer: Nivaldo (14 goals)
- Biggest home win: São Domingos 4-0 Sete de Junho (5 February 2012)
- Biggest away win: Lagarto 0-4 São Domingos (4 April 2012)
- Highest scoring: Olímpico 1-5 São Domingos (4 March 2012); Sergipe 1-5 São Domingos (28 March 2012)
- Longest winning run: 4 games Confiança; Socorrense; São Domingos
- Longest unbeaten run: 12 games Confiança
- Longest winless run: 10 games Sergipe
- Longest losing run: 6 games Sergipe
- Highest attendance: 9.830; Confiança 1-0 Itabaiana

The 2012 Campeonato Sergipano de Futebol Profissional da Primeira Divisão - Série A1 (a.k.a. Sergipão 2012) was the 89th season of Sergipe's top professional football league. Associação Olímpica de Itabaiana won their 10th title

== Format ==
The ten clubs were divided into two groups that will play in two tournaments. In the first tournament stage the teams from one group will play within their group in a single round-robin tournament. The two best teams from each group will advance to the playoffs and while the next best two will play for the Taça Cidade de Aracaju. In the second tournament stage the teams will play with against the teams in the other group in a single round-robin format. The two best teams from each group will advance to the playoffs and while the next best two will play for the Taça Estado de Sergipe. The winner of both the Taça Cidade de Aracaju and Taça Estado de Sergipe will play for the state championship. If the same team wins both tournament, they are automatically declared the champion.

=== Qualifications and Relegation ===
The best two teams will qualify for 2013 Copa do Brasil and the 2013 Copa do Nordeste. The best team not playing in Campeonato Brasileiro Série A, B, or C will qualify for 2012 Campeonato Brasileiro Série D. And the worst two teams will be relegated to 2013 Second Division.

== Participating teams ==
Club	Home city	2011 result
Associação Desportiva Confiança	Aracaju	4th
Associação Atlética Guarany	Porto da Folha	5th
Associação Olímpica de Itabaiana	Itabaiana	8th
Lagarto Futebol Clube	Lagarto	2nd (Série A2)
Olímpico Esporte Clube	Itabaianinha	7th
Sociedade Esportiva River Plate	Carmópolis	1st
São Domingos Futebol Clube	São Domingos	2nd
Club Sportivo Sergipe	Aracaju	3rd
Sete de Junho Esporte Clube	Tobias Barreto	1st (Série A2)
Associação Desportiva Socorrense	Nossa Senhora do Socorro	6th

== Taça Cidade de Aracaju ==
The 2012 Taça Cidade de Aracaju began on January 28 and ended on March 4.

=== First stage ===
==== Group A standings ====
Pos	Team	Pld	W	D	L	GF	GA	GD	Pts
1	Itabaiana (A)	10	6	2	2	15	9	+6	20
2	São Domingos (A)	10	5	0	5	17	13	+4	15
3	Lagarto	10	4	1	5	11	14	−3	13
4	Guarany	10	3	3	4	6	6	0	12
5	Sergipe	10	0	2	8	7	20	−13	2

Updated to match(es) played on 26 February. Source: Globoesporte Sergipe
Rules for classification: 1st points; 2nd wins; 3rd goal difference; 4th goals scored; 5th red cards received; 6th yellow cards received; 7th draw
(A) Advances to semifinal

==== Group B standings ====
Pos	Team	Pld	W	D	L	GF	GA	GD	Pts
1	Socorrense (A)	10	6	2	2	12	7	+5	20
2	River Plate (A)	10	6	1	3	19	11	+8	19
3	Confiança	10	6	1	3	15	7	+8	19
4	Olímpico	10	3	2	5	8	16	−8	11
5	Sete de Junho	10	2	2	6	8	15	−7	8

Updated to match(es) played on 26 February. Source: Globoesporte Sergipe
Rules for classification: 1st points; 2nd wins; 3rd goal difference; 4th goals scored; 5th red cards received; 6th yellow cards received; 7th draw
(A) Advances to semifinal

== Knockout phase ==
=== Bracket ===
Semi-finals
Socorrense	3
São Domingos	3
Itabaiana	1
River Plate	0

Finals
Socorrense	1
Itabaiana	4

=== Semifinals ===
Home	Score	Away
São Domingos	2–1	Socorrense
Socorrense	2–1	São Domingos
River Plate	0-0	Itabaiana
Itabaiana	1-0	River Plate

11 March	São Domingos	2 – 1	Socorrense	São Domingos
15:15 UTC-03:00	Deivid 47'; Juninho 74'		David 67'	Stadium: Estádio Arnaldo Pereira; Referee: Claudionor dos Santos Júnior

11 March	River Plate	0 – 0	Itabaiana	Carmópolis
17:00 UTC-03:00				Stadium: Estádio Fernando França; Referee: Antônio Hora Filho

18 March	Socorrense	2 – 1	São Domingos	Nossa Senhora do Socorro
15:15 UTC-03:00	Alex 4'; André 90+3'		Deivid 31'	Stadium: Estádio Wellington Elias; Referee: Antônio Hora Filho

18 March	Itabaiana	1 – 0	River Plate	Itabaiana
16:00 UTC-03:00	Edson 18'			Stadium: Estádio Presidente Emílio Garrastazu Médici; Referee: Rogério Lima da Rocha

=== Finals ===
Home	Score	Away
Socorrense	1–4	Itabaiana
Itabaiana	0-0	Socorrense

21 March	Socorrense	1 – 4	Itabaiana	Nossa Senhora do Socorro
15:15 UTC-03:00	Alex 4'		Rena 18'; Eridon 47'; Magno 60'; Alex Paulista 90+2'	Stadium: Estádio Wellington Elias; Referee: Claudionor do Santos Júnior

26 March	Itabaiana	0 – 0	Socorrense	Itabaiana
16:00 UTC-03:00				Stadium: Estádio Presidente Emílio Garrastazu Médici; Attendance: 4.298; Referee: Cláudio Francisco Lima e Silva

Taça Cidade de Aracaju
2012 Champion
Itabaiana
1st Title

== Taça Estado de Sergipe ==
The 2012 Taça Estado de Sergipe began on March 28 and ended on May 13.

=== First stage ===
==== Group A standings ====
Pos	Team	Pld	W	D	L	GF	GA	GD	Pts
1	São Domingos (A)	8	5	2	1	17	5	+12	17
2	Sergipe (A)	8	5	1	2	10	9	+1	16
3	Itabaiana	8	3	3	2	7	6	+1	12
4	Lagarto	8	1	3	4	3	11	−8	6
5	Guarany	8	0	3	5	6	13	−7	3

Updated to match(es) played on 26 April. Source: Globoesporte Sergipe
Rules for classification: 1st points; 2nd wins; 3rd goal difference; 4th goals scored; 5th red cards received; 6th yellow cards received; 7th draw
(A) Advances to semifinal

==== Group B standings ====
Pos	Team	Pld	W	D	L	GF	GA	GD	Pts
1	Confiança (A)	8	4	4	0	10	3	+7	16
2	River Plate (A)	8	3	2	3	6	6	0	11
3	Socorrense	8	2	4	2	9	11	−2	10
4	Sete de Junho	8	2	2	4	5	10	−5	8
5	Olímpico	8	1	4	3	5	5	0	7

Updated to match(es) played on 26 April. Source: Globoesporte Sergipe
Rules for classification: 1st points; 2nd wins; 3rd goal difference; 4th goals scored; 5th red cards received; 6th yellow cards received; 7th draw
(A) Advances to semifinal

== Knockout phase ==
=== Bracket ===
Semi-finals
São Domingos	4
River Plate	2
Confiança	2
Sergipe	0

Finals
São Domingos	3
Confiança	3

=== Semifinals ===
Home	Score	Away
River Plate	2 - 1	São Domingos
São Domingos	3 - 0	River Plate
Sergipe	0 - 1	Confiança
Confiança	1 - 0	Sergipe

3 May	River Plate	2 – 1	São Domingos	Carmópolis
20:15 UTC-03:00				Stadium: Estádio Fernando França

6 May	São Domingos	3 – 0	River Plate	São Domingos
15:15 UTC-03:00				Stadium: Estádio Arnaldo Pereira

2 May	Sergipe	0 – 1	Confiança	Aracaju
20:15 UTC-03:00			Rafael 40'	Stadium: Estádio Lourival Baptista

6 May	Confiança	1 – 0	Sergipe	Aracaju
16:00 UTC-03:00				Stadium: Estádio Lourival Baptista

=== Finals ===
Home	Score	Away
São Domingos	0 - 0	Confiança
Confiança	3 - 3	São Domingos

São Domingos	0 – 0	Confiança	São Domingos
			Stadium: Estádio Arnaldo Pereira

Confiança	3 – 3	São Domingos	Aracaju
			Stadium: Estádio Lourival Baptista

Taça Estado de Sergipe
2012 Champion
Confiança
2nd Title

== Superfinals ==
Home	Score	Away
Itabaiana	3 - 1	Confiança
Confiança	1 - 0	Itabaiana

Itabaiana	3 – 1	Confiança	Itabaiana
			Stadium: Estádio Presidente Emílio Garrastazu Médici

Confiança	1 – 0	Itabaiana	Aracaju
			Stadium: Estádio Lourival Baptista

Campeonato Sergipano
2012 Champion
Itabaiana
10th Title

== Overall standings ==
Pos	Team	Pld	W	D	L	GF	GA	GD	Pts	Qualification or relegation
1	Itabaiana	24	12	7	5	30	18	+12	43	2012 Campeonato Brasileiro Série D, 2013 Copa do Nordeste and 2013 Copa do Brasil
2	Confiança	24	13	7	4	32	16	+16	46	2013 Copa do Nordeste and 2013 Copa do Brasil (Note: Confiança qualified for 2013 Copa do Brasil as Copa Sergiqe champions)
3	São Domingos	24	13	4	7	44	26	+18	43	
4	River Plate	22	10	4	8	27	22	+5	34	
5	Socorrense	22	9	7	6	25	25	0	34	
6	Lagarto	18	5	4	9	15	25	−10	19	
7	Sergipe	20	5	3	12	17	31	−14	18	
8	Olímpico	18	4	6	8	13	23	−10	18	
9	Sete de Junho	18	4	4	10	13	25	−12	16	Relegation to Campeonato Sergipano Série A-2
10	Guarany	18	3	6	9	12	19	−7	15	Relegation to Campeonato Sergipano Série A-2

Updated to match(es) played on 26 April. Source: FSF - Football Association of Sergipe state
Rules for classification: 1) points; 2) goal difference; 3) number of goals scored.
