= Fabinho Recife =

Brazilian footballer (born 1982)

Personal information
- Full name: Fabiano Aguiar Dionizio Laurentino
- Date of birth: 22 September 1982 (age 44)
- Place of birth: Limoeiro, Pernambuco, Brazil
- Position: Forward

Team information
- Current team: São Domingos

Senior career*
Years	Team	Apps	(Gls)
2001	Sport Recife	13	(3)
2003	Santa Cruz		
2005	Ypiranga		
2005	Sergipe		
2005	Uberaba		
2006	Itumbiara		
2006–2007	Vera Cruz (PE)	0	(0)
2006	→ Ypiranga (loan)		
2007	→ Guarany (CE) (loan)		
2007–2008	Cherno More	13	(1)
2008	→ Pinhalnovense (loan)	5	(0)
2009	Cabense		
2009	Bacabal		
2009	→ Viana (loan)		
2010	Itabaiana		
2010	Viana		
2011	Sousa	0	(0)
2011	Guarany (CE)	0	(0)
2012	CSE	0	(0)
2012	São Domingos	0	(0)
- * Club domestic league appearances and goals

Fabiano Aguiar Dionizio Laurentino (born 22 September 1982), known as Fabinho Recife, is a Brazilian footballer who plays as forward for São Domingos Futebol Clube.

== Biography ==
He was signed by PFC Cherno More Varna from Vera Cruz (PE) on 11 July 2007. However, he left for C.D. Pinhalnovense along with Djalma in January 2008.

In December 2008 he returned to Brazil and returned to his journeyman career in state competitions. Recently he played for Guarany de Sobral in 2011 Campeonato Cearense, however he was released prior the start of 2011 Campeonato Brasileiro Série C.

In January 2012 he was signed by CSE but in March left for São Domingos. He played for the club in 2012 Campeonato Sergipano (scored a goal in semi-final) and 2012 Copa do Brasil.
