= Big Twelve (Brazilian football) =

Group of twelve football clubs

In Brazilian football, the Big Twelve (Portuguese: Os Doze Grandes) refers to a group of 12 clubs: Atlético Mineiro, Botafogo, Corinthians, Cruzeiro, Flamengo, Fluminense, Grêmio, Internacional, Palmeiras, Santos, São Paulo, and Vasco da Gama. They are considered the most popular and successful sides in Brazilian football, having won all but six editions of the Campeonato Brasileiro Série A between them since the tournament's inception.

== The clubs ==
Club	City	State	Founded	Stadium	Capacity
Clube Atlético Mineiro	Belo Horizonte	Minas Gerais	1908	Arena MRV	47,465
Botafogo de Futebol e Regatas	Rio de Janeiro	Rio de Janeiro	1894 (1904 in Football)	Nilton Santos	44,661
Sport Club Corinthians Paulista	São Paulo	São Paulo	1910	Arena Corinthians	49,205
Cruzeiro Esporte Clube	Belo Horizonte	Minas Gerais	1921	Mineirão	61,846
Clube de Regatas do Flamengo	Rio de Janeiro	Rio de Janeiro	1895 (1912 in Football)	Maracanã	78,838
Fluminense Football Club	Rio de Janeiro	Rio de Janeiro	1902	Maracanã	78,838
Grêmio Foot-Ball Porto Alegrense	Porto Alegre	Rio Grande do Sul	1903	Arena do Grêmio	55,662
Sport Club Internacional	Porto Alegre	Rio Grande do Sul	1909	Beira-Rio	50,128
Sociedade Esportiva Palmeiras	São Paulo	São Paulo	1914	Allianz Parque	43,713
Santos Futebol Clube	Santos	São Paulo	1912	Vila Belmiro	16,068
São Paulo Futebol Clube	São Paulo	São Paulo	1930	Morumbi	72,039
Club de Regatas Vasco da Gama	Rio de Janeiro	Rio de Janeiro	1898 (1915 in Football)	São Januário	21,880

Big Twelve clubs' locations

== Honours and popularity ==
Their status as major clubs in Brazilian football stems from their historical performances at their respective state leagues. For a long time, there were no national tournaments in Brazil (with the first edition of the Brasileirão being only held in 1937 and then officially in 1959). Competition between teams from different states was sparse (with the Torneio Rio-São Paulo, held irregularly between 1933 and 1966 and then from 1993 to 2002, being the most notable tournament of this nature); thus, these clubs first earned their distinguished reputation for being dominant within state borders.

As of 2024

Performances in the Campeonato Carioca
Club	Titles
Flamengo	38
Fluminense	33
Vasco da Gama	24
Botafogo	21
Other clubs	11

Performances in the Campeonato Gaúcho
Club	Titles
Internacional	46
Grêmio	43
Other clubs	16

Performances in the Campeonato Mineiro
Club	Titles
Atlético Mineiro	50
Cruzeiro	38
Other clubs	25

Performances in the Campeonato Paulista
Club	Titles
Corinthians	30
Palmeiras	26
Santos	22
São Paulo	22
Other clubs	34

This regional success translated into national and international prominence. The Big Twelve clubs have dominated the Brasileirão and the Copa do Brasil while also achieving notable success in the Copa Libertadores, the FIFA Club World Cup, and other international club competitions.

Performance in the Brasileirão by club
Club	Titles
Palmeiras	12
Santos	8
Flamengo	8
Corinthians	7
São Paulo	6
Cruzeiro	4
Fluminense	4
Vasco da Gama	4
Internacional	3
Atlético Mineiro	3
Botafogo	3
Grêmio	2
Other clubs	6

Performance in the Copa do Brasil by club
Club	Titles
Cruzeiro	6
Grêmio	5
Flamengo	5
Palmeiras	4
Corinthians	4
Atlético Mineiro	2
Fluminense	1
Internacional	1
Santos	1
Vasco da Gama	1
São Paulo	1
Botafogo	—
Other clubs	6

Performance in the Copa Libertadores by club
Club	Participations	Best Appearance
Palmeiras	25	Champions (1999, 2020, 2021)
São Paulo	23	Champions (1992, 1993, 2005)
Grêmio	22	Champions (1983, 1995, 2017)
Flamengo	21	Champions (1981, 2019, 2022, 2025)
Corinthians	18	Champions (2012)
Cruzeiro	17	Champions (1976, 1997)
Santos	16	Champions (1962, 1963, 2011)
Internacional	16	Champions (2006, 2010)
Atlético Mineiro	14	Champions (2013)
Fluminense	10	Champions (2023)
Vasco da Gama	9	Champions (1998)
Botafogo	7	Champions (2024)

Performance in the FIFA Club World Cup/ Intercontinental Cup by club
Club	Participations	Best Appearance
São Paulo	3	Champions (1992, 1993, 2005)
Santos	3	Champions (1962, 1963)
Corinthians	2	Champions (2000, 2012)
Flamengo	3	Champions (1981)
Grêmio	3	Champions (1983)
Internacional	2	Champions (2006)
Palmeiras	3	Runner-up (1999, 2021)
Cruzeiro	2	Runner-up (1976, 1997)
Vasco da Gama	2	Runner-up (1998, 2000)
Fluminense	2	Runner-up (2023)
Atlético Mineiro	1	Third place (2013)
Botafogo	1	Quarter-finals (2024)

The Big Twelve are also the most supported clubs in Brazil, enjoying nationwide popularity. Even away from state borders, it is not hard to find supporters of Big Twelve clubs, often surpassing even local clubs.

Supporters Numbers in Brazil
Club	Supporters
Flamengo	46.9 million
Corinthians	30.4 million
São Paulo	21.2 million
Palmeiras	16.5 million
Vasco da Gama	13.2 million
Cruzeiro	13.0 million
Grêmio	9.8 million
Atlético Mineiro	9.2 million
Internacional	7.5 million
Fluminense	7.2 million
Santos	6.6 million
Botafogo	5.3 million

== All-time top scorers ==
Club	Player	Years	Goals	Ref
Atlético Mineiro	Reinaldo	1973–1985	255	
Botafogo	Quarentinha	1954–1964	313	
Corinthians	Cláudio	1945–1957	305	
Cruzeiro	Tostão	1963–1972	249	
Flamengo	Zico	1971–1983, 1985–1989	509	
Fluminense	Waldo	1954–1961	319	
Grêmio	Alcindo	1964–1971	230	
Internacional	Carlitos	1938–1951	485	
Palmeiras	Heitor	1916–1931	315	
Santos	Pelé	1956–1974	1091	
São Paulo	Serginho	1973–1982	250	
Vasco da Gama	Roberto Dinamite	1971–1993	708	

== Controversies ==
The validity of the concept of a Big Twelve is often a topic of debate. It is at times portrayed as a rigid construct that excludes teams that merit a place in this group and at other times it is argued to be an outdated definition that includes clubs whose place is no longer merited.

=== The case for more teams ===
==== Esporte Clube Bahia ====
Bahia hails from Salvador, Bahia and is one of the two major clubs from the Campeonato Baiano (the other being Vitória). It is the only non-Big Twelve club to have two Brasileirão titles to its name (tied with Grêmio), notably beating Pelé and Os Santásticos in the final of the 1959 edition. In terms of fanbase size, its supporters compete with those of Fluminense and Botafogo and are ahead of any non-Big Twelve ones. It is, in fact, one of the Clube dos 13's founding members alongside the Big Twelve. Prior to its first relegation in 1997, Bahia was considered one of the biggest clubs in Brazil. However, its Brasileirão campaigns have been generally unimpressive since the 1980s, and the club spent much of the 2000s outside the first division.

Bahia was relegated in 1997 to the Campeonato Brasileiro Serie B and only came back to the top tier of Brazilian football in 2000 with a political maneuver, after CBF's withdrawal from organizing the championship of that year due to legal problems and handing it to Clube dos 13 because the club failed in achieving the promotion to Serie A in 1998 and 1999. Bahia was again relegated to Serie B in 2003 and relegated to Serie C in 2005, the low point in the history of the club. The team disputed two seasons of Serie C until it achieved promotion to Serie B in 2007, and in 2010 the team returned to the Brasileirão. Bahia was relegated in 2014 Campeonato Brasileiro Série A, but this time they only stayed two seasons out of Série A, making their comeback in the 2017 edition. Bahia has since then been acquired by City Group and gained more financial and competitive stability.

The club also lags behind Big Twelve clubs in financial assets.

==== Paraná State clubs ====
From Curitiba, Paraná state capital, there are Coritiba Foot Ball Club and Club Athletico Paranaense, both playing in the Campeonato Paranaense. Athletico Paranaense is often regarded as one of the best-run clubs in Brazil, with financial results that rival those of the Big Twelve. The club has won the Brasileirão once, in 2001, and its best campaigns at the Copa Libertadores were a runner-up showing in 2005 and 2022. However, the club has a very poor pre-1990s record at the Brasileirão and its fanbase is relatively small compared to Big Twelve clubs and very much contained within Paraná's borders. Coritiba won one title of Brasileirão, conquered in 1985 and it was the first club of Paraná to participate Copa Libertadores, in 1986, as well as the first club to carry an expression title in its state. Athletico Paranaense also won the title of Copa do Brasil, which Botafogo did not win, and also Copa Sudamericana (or another of its predecessors), which Fluminense, Grêmio and Corinthians did not win. While Coritiba was runner-up of Copa do Brasil twice, in 2011 and 2012.

==== Other clubs ====
Like the Big Twelve and Bahia, Coritiba and Athletico Paranaense, the clubs Guarani, Portuguesa, Goiás, Sport and Vitória were also members of the Clube dos 13, composed by the most important and traditional clubs during its active period.

Guarani, the 1978 Campeonato Brasileiro Série A champion and Sport, the 1987 Campeonato Brasileiro Série A champion, are the other Campeonato Brasileiro Série A champions outside the Big Twelve, also the latter being the 2008 Copa do Brasil champion. In 1979 Copa Libertadores, Guarani reached the semi-finals of the competition. And Sport's best appearances in international competitions were the round of 16 in the 2009 Copa Libertadores and the quarter-finals of the 2017 Copa Sudamericana.

Goiás and Vitória spent mostly of the previous seasons on the second division, but achieved good results in the last years. Goiás was the 2010 Copa Sudamericana runner-up, and Vitoria was the 1993 Campeonato Brasileiro Série A and 2010 Copa do Brasil runner-up.

Portuguesa is historically one of the strongest teams in São Paulo (state), winning two Torneio Rio–São Paulo, the only team outside G-12 to win the competition. In addition, it has the same number of titles as Fluminense (2), and one more title than São Paulo and Flamengo (both have only 1). Portuguesa was also the 1996 Campeonato Brasileiro Série A runner-up. After the "Héverton Case", in 2013, the team has been relegated to the second division, further being relegated two times straight.

During the early 2000s, São Caetano got noticed in both national and international media after being runner-up of 2002 Copa Libertadores, the most important tournament in South America. They lost the final to Paraguay club Olimpia on penalty shootouts. They were also runner-up in both 2000 Campeonato Brasileiro Série A and 2001 Campeonato Brasileiro Série A.

After the Red Bull took over the control of the 1991 Campeonato Brasileiro Série A runner-up, Clube Atlético Bragantino, and changed its name to Red Bull Bragantino. The club claims that it will be one of Brazil's best clubs in the future, being runner-up in the 2021 Copa Sudamericana.

Fortaleza, club of Ceará state, recently accumulated appearances in the Campeonato Brasileiro Série A and Copa Sudamericana, being runner-up in the 2023 Copa Sudamericana, losing the final in penalty shootouts.

=== The case for fewer teams ===
It is often argued that there is too big a gap even between Big Twelve clubs in honors (outside of state leagues) and fanbase size. Flamengo and Corinthians could be argued to be in a tier of their own in terms of supporters, far above third place São Paulo and Palmeiras. Still, this supposed superiority does not translate into the pitch, with many teams claiming more titles than them in the Brasileirão, Copa do Brasil, Copa Libertadores, and FIFA Club World Cup. Similarly, it's sometimes argued if Santos and Botafogo are below their regional rivals (Corinthians, São Paulo and Palmeiras all boast significantly more supporters than Santos; Flamengo, Fluminense and Vasco da Gama are on the list of winners of the Copa do Brasil, not won by Botafogo). However, these two clubs' importance to Brazilian football cannot be understated: Santos's Os Santásticos was the most dominant Brazilian side ever, winning six Brasileirão and eight Campeonato Paulista titles in the 1960s; and Botafogo hold the record for most capped players for the Brazil national football team in World Cups.

== See also ==
- State football leagues in Brazil
- Big Three (Belgium)
- Big Three (Costa Rica)
- Big Three (Greece)
- Big Three (Italy)
- Big Three (Netherlands)
- Big Three (Peru)
- Big Three (Portugal)
- Big Three (Spain)
- Big Three (Sweden)
- Big Three (Turkey)
- Big Four (Mexico)
- Big Five (Argentina)
- Big Six (Premier League)
