= Big Three (Greece) =

Nickname of successful Greek sport clubs

Location of the three clubs in Attica

The Big Three (Greek: Οι Τρεις Μεγάλοι, Oi Treis Megaloi) is the nickname of the three most successful and supported sports clubs in Greece, all of which are located within the so-called Attica basin or Athens metropolitan area. The football teams of AEK Athens, Olympiacos and Panathinaikos have a great rivalry, and are usually the main contenders for the title. Together they share a total of 82 out of 90 Greek Football Championships ever played, and generally they usually end up sharing the top three positions. AEK has won 14 league titles (last won in 2026), Olympiacos has won a record 48 league titles (last won in 2025) and Panathinaikos has won 20 league titles (last won in 2010).

== Head to head stats ==
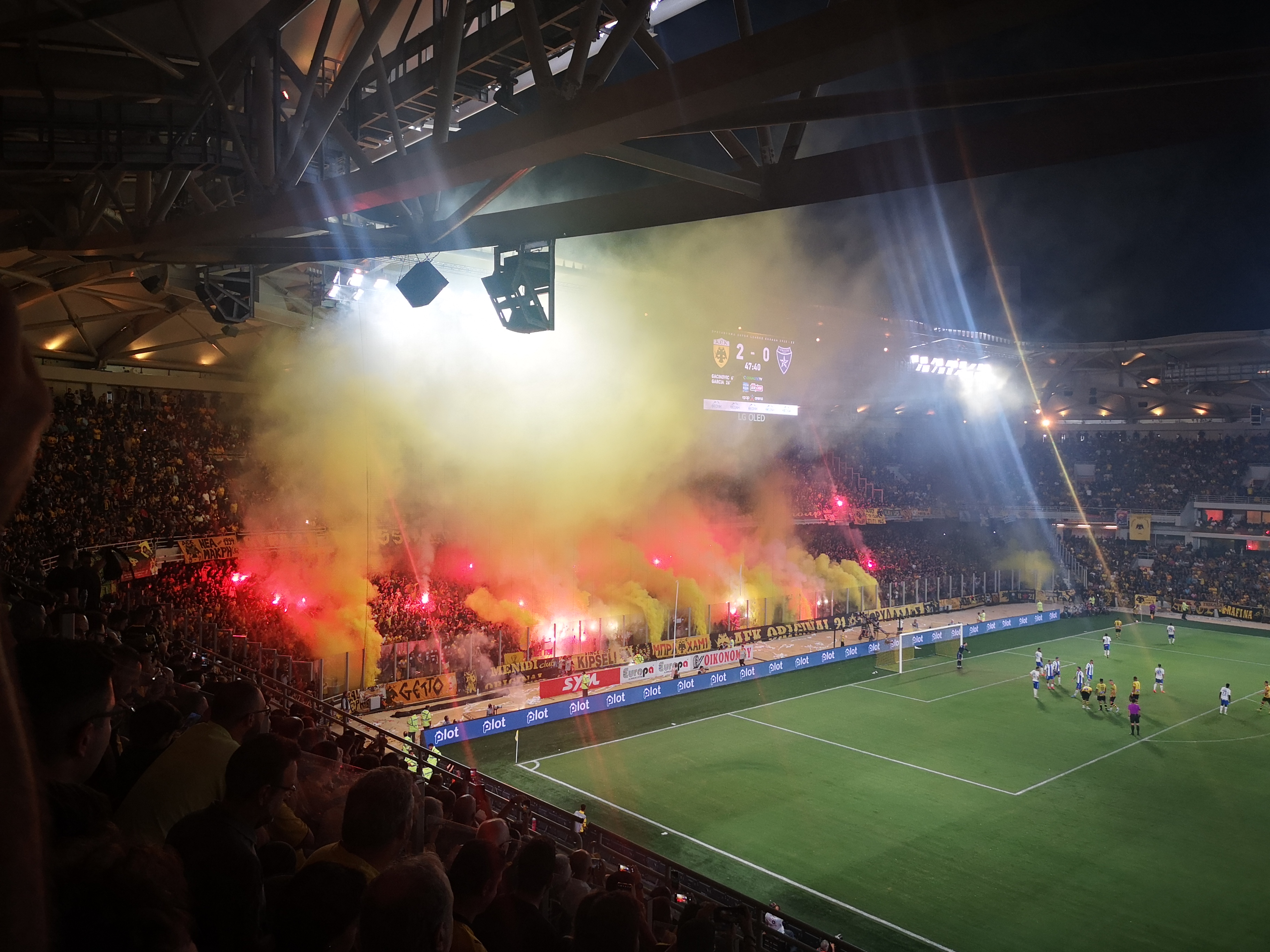
Agia Sophia Stadium

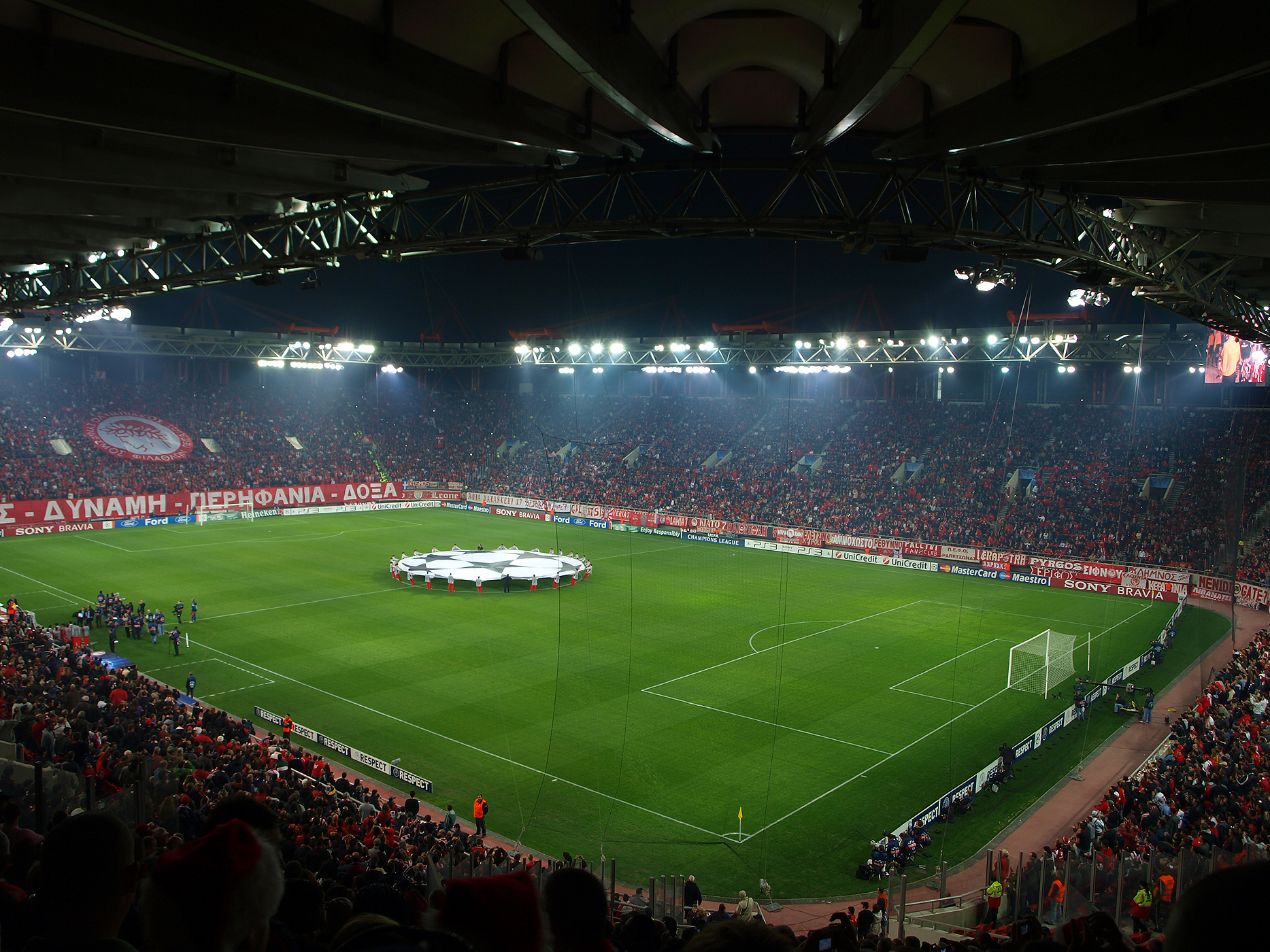
Karaiskakis Stadium

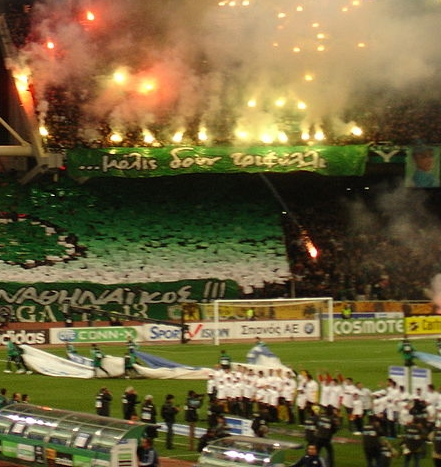
Olympic Stadium (Athens)

=== Matches ===
As of 17 May 2026

==== AEK Athens vs Olympiacos ====
Competition	Matches	Wins		Draws	Goals		Home wins		Home draws		Away wins		Other venue wins	
Competition	Matches	AEK	OSFP	Draws	AEK	OSFP	AEK	OSFP	AEK	OSFP	AEK	OSFP	AEK	OSFP
Super League Greece	175	47	83	45	162	278	27	51	28	17	19	32	1	0
Greek Cup	48	20	20	8	37	43	11	9	2	5	5	8	4	3
Greek Super Cup	1	0	1	0	1	3	–	–	–	–	–	–	0	1
Greek League Cup	1	1	0	0	3	2	–	–	–	–	–	–	1	0
Total	225	68	104	53	203	326	38	60	30	22	24	40	6	4

==== AEK Athens vs Panathinaikos ====
Competition	Matches	Wins		Draws	Goals		Home wins		Home draws		Away wins		Other venue wins	
Competition	Matches	AEK	PAO	Draws	AEK	PAO	AEK	PAO	AEK	PAO	AEK	PAO	AEK	PAO
Super League Greece	177	51	70	56	167	203	36	39	22	33	15	29	0	2
Athens FCA League	60	12	24	13	50	73	7	13	6	5	5	11	–	–
Greek Cup	31	10	9	12	45	40	5	4	5	3	4	3	1	2
Greek Super Cup	4	0	2	2	2	6	–	–	–	–	–	–	0	2
Total	272	73	105	83	264	322	48	56	33	41	24	43	1	6

==== Olympiacos vs Panathinaikos ====
Competition	Matches	Wins		Draws	Goals		Home wins		Home draws		Away wins		Other venue wins	
Competition	Matches	OSFP	PAO	Draws	OSFP	PAO	OSFP	PAO	OSFP	PAO	OSFP	PAO	OSFP	PAO
Super League Greece	187	72	49	66			43	29	28	36	27	20	2	0
Greek Cup	42	20	9	13			12	4	4	7	7	1	1	4
Greek League Cup	2	0	0	2	3	3	0	0	1	1	0	0	–	–
Total	231	92	58	81			55	33	33	44	34	21	3	4

=== Head-to-head ranking in Super League Greece ===
P.	60	61	62	63	64	65	66	67	68	69	70	71	72	73	74	75	76	77	78	79	80	81	82	83	84	85	86	87	88	89	90	91	92	93	94	95	96	97	98	99	00	01	02	03	04	05	06	07	08	09	10	11	12	13	14	15	16	17	18	19	20	21	22	23	24	25	26
1	**1**	**1**	**1**	**1**	**1**	**1**	**1**	**1**	**1**	**1**	**1**	**1**	**1**	**1**	**1**	**1**		**1**	**1**	**1**	**1**	**1**	**1**	**1**	**1**		**1**	**1**		**1**	**1**	**1**	**1**	**1**	**1**	**1**	**1**	**1**	**1**	**1**	**1**	**1**	**1**	**1**	**1**	**1**	**1**	**1**	**1**	**1**	**1**	**1**	**1**	**1**	**1**	**1**	**1**	**1**	**1**		**1**	**1**	**1**	**1**		**1**	**1**
2	**2**	**2**	**2**	**2**	**2**	**2**	**2**	**2**	**2**	**2**	**2**		**2**		**2**	**2**	**2**	**2**		**2**		**2**	**2**		**2**	**2**		**2**	**2**	**2**	**2**	**2**	**2**	**2**	**2**	**2**	**2**	**2**	**2**	**2**	**2**	**2**	**2**	**2**	**2**	**2**	**2**	**2**	**2**	**2**		**2**	**2**		**2**	**2**		**2**		**2**				**2**	**2**	**2**	**2**
3	**3**			**3**	**3**	**3**	**3**	**3**	**3**		**3**	**3**	**3**	**3**			**3**		**3**		**3**			**3**		**3**	**3**			**3**		**3**	**3**	**3**	**3**		**3**		**3**	**3**	**3**	**3**	**3**	**3**		**3**	**3**	**3**	**3**	**3**	**3**		**3**				**3**	**3**	**3**	**3**	**3**			**3**	**3**		
4		**4**	**4**														**4**	**4**	**4**		**4**		**4**			**4**					**4**														**4**							**4**					**4**				**4**	**4**	**4**		**4**	**4**	**4**
5														**5**	**5**	**5**				**5**		**5**					**5**		**5**							**5**		**5**													**5**											**5**	**5**				
6										**6**														**6**																														**6**													
7												**7**													**7**			**7**																																							
8																													**8**																															**8**							
9																																																																			
10																																																																			
11																																																											**11**								
12																																																																			
13																																																																			
14																																																																			
15																																																						**15**													
16																																																																			
17																																																																			
18																																																																			
**Super League 2**
1																																																								**1**											
**Gamma Ethniki**
1																																																							**1**												

- Total: Olympiacos with **34** higher finishes, Panathinaikos with **18** higher finishes and AEK Athens with **15** higher finishes.

=== Honours ===
Numbers with bold indicate the record holder in the competition.

As of 17 May 2026

Competition	AEK Athens	Olympiacos	Panathinaikos
National
Super League Greece	14	**48**	20
Greek Cup	16	**29**	20
Greek Super Cup	2	**5**	3
Greek League Cup (defunct)	**1**	0	0
Aggregate	33	82	43
Regional
Athens FCA Championship (defunct)	5	—	**17**
Piraeus FCA Championship (defunct)	—	**25**	—
Aggregate	5	25	17
International
UEFA Conference League	0	**1**	0
Balkans Cup (defunct)	0	**1**	**1**
Aggregate	0	2	1
Total	38	109	61

== European competitions ==
=== Best campaigns ===
As of 2 May 2026

Club	European Cup / Champions League			Cup Winners' Cup	Inter-Cities Fairs Cup / UEFA Cup / Europa League		Conference League			
Club	Quarter-finals	Semi-finals	Final	Quarter-finals	Quarter-finals	Semi-finals	Quarter-finals	Semi-finals	Final	Winners
Olympiacos	1998–99	—	—	1992–93	—	—	—	—	—	2023–24
Panathinaikos	1984–85, 1995–96	1991–92, 2001–02	1970–71	—	1987–88, 2002–03	—	—	—	—	—
AEK Athens	1968–69	—	—	1996–97, 1997–98	—	1976–77	2025–26	—	—	—

=== Eternal Standings ===
Club	Pld	W	D	L	GF	GA	GD	Pts
Olympiacos	259	100	89	70	336	251	+85	389
Panathinaikos	260	84	91	85	282	275	+7	343
AEK Athens	255	76	74	105	252	344	-92	302

=== UEFA 5-year Club Rankings ===
#	Club	2020–21	2021–22	2022–23	2023–24	2024–25	2025–26	Total Points
37	Olympiacos	10,000	8,000	3,000	17,000	18,500	5,750	62,250
111	Panathinaikos	—	—	2,000	3,000	11,000	18,250	29,250
159	AEK Athens	3,000	1,500	—	3,000	2,000	14,500	24,000

== Top scorers ==
Rank	Player	Club	AEK Athens vs Olympiacos	AEK Athens vs Panathinaikos	Olympiacos vs Panathinaikos	Total
1	(Greece) Dimitris Saravakos	AEK Athens / Panathinaikos	1	11	16	28
2	(Greece) Mimis Papaioannou	AEK Athens	14	10	—	24
2	(Greece) Giorgos Sideris	Olympiacos	11	—	13	24
4	(Greece) Thomas Mavros	AEK Athens	16	5	—	21
5	(Greece) Giannis Vazos	Olympiacos	11	—	9	20
5	(Serbia) Predrag Đorđević	Olympiacos	12	—	8	20

== Personnel in all three clubs ==
=== Players ===
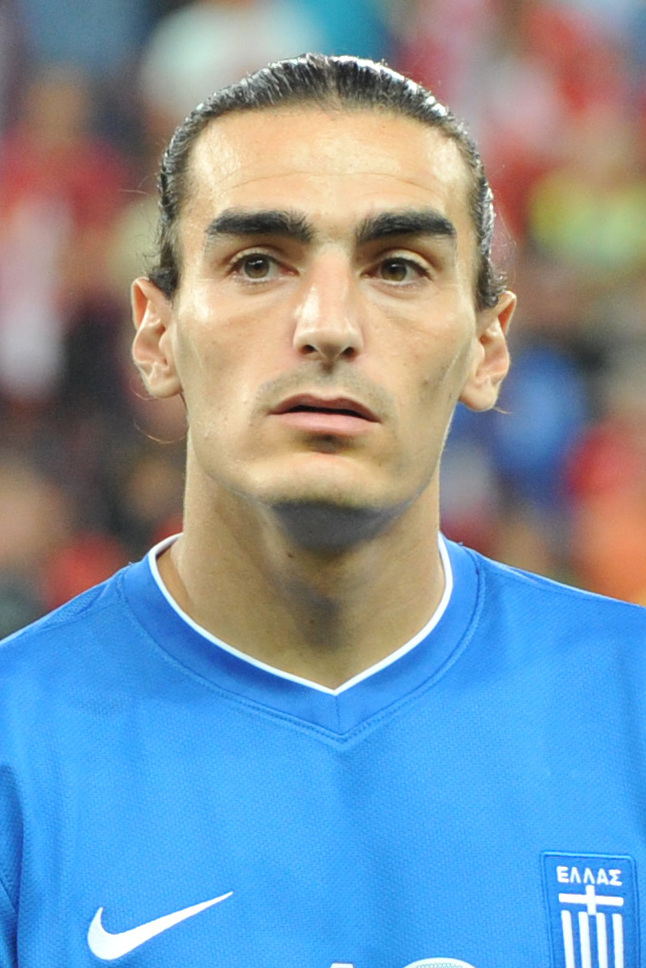
Lazaros Christodoulopoulos

- (Greece) Tasos Mitropoulos (Olympiacos 1981–1992, 1997, AEK Athens 1992–1994, Panathinaikos 1994)
- (Greece) Lazaros Christodoulopoulos (Panathinaikos 2008–2013, AEK Athens 2016–2018, Olympiacos 2018–2020)

=== Managers ===
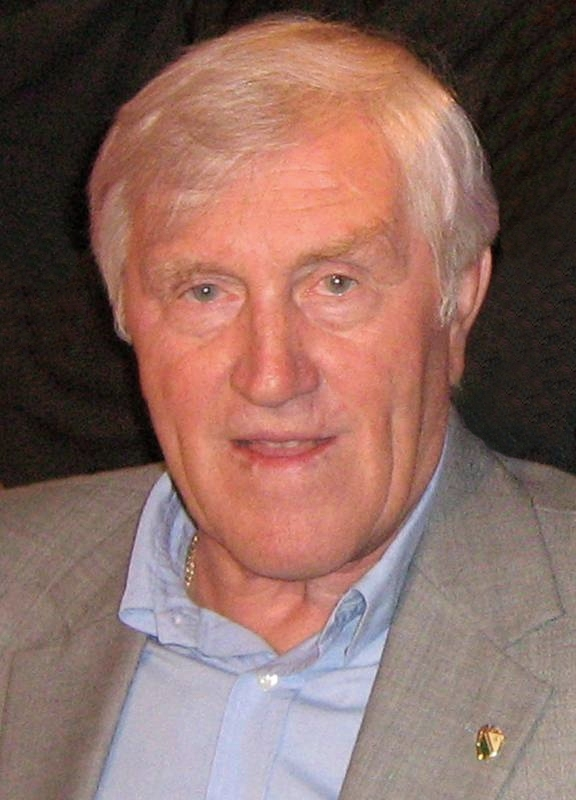
Jacek Gmoch

- (Greece) Themos Asderis (AEK Athens 1932–1933, 1936–1937, Panathinaikos 1943–1944, Olympiacos 1945-1947)
- (Austria) Helmut Senekowitsch (Panathinaikos 1980–1981, Olympiacos 1981, AEK Athens 1983–1984)
- (Poland) Jacek Gmoch (Panathinaikos 1983–1985, AEK Athens 1985–1986, Olympiacos 1988-1989)

== See also ==
- Big Three (Belgium)
- Big Three (Costa Rica)
- Big Three (Italy)
- Big Three (Netherlands)
- Big Three (Peru)
- Big Three (Portugal)
- Big Three (Spain)
- Big Three (Sweden)
- Big Three (Turkey)
- Big Four (Mexico)
- Big Five (Argentina)
- Big Six (Premier League)
- Big Twelve (Brazil)
- P.O.K.
