= Vitor Flora =

Brazilian footballer

Personal information
- Full name: Vitor Coutinho Flora
- Date of birth: 21 February 1990 (age 36)
- Place of birth: São Joaquim da Barra, Brazil
- Height: 1.80 m (5 ft 11 in)
- Positions: Striker; attacking midfielder

Team information
- Current team: Araguaia Atlético Clube

Youth career
- –2008: Botafogo-SP
- 2008–2010: Liverpool Reserves

Senior career*
Years	Team	Apps	(Gls)
2007–2008	Botafogo-SP	8	(4)
2010	Goiás	10	(0)
2011–2012	Botafogo-SP	26	(6)
2013–2014	Rio Branco-SP	8	(0)
2014	AA Francana	4	(0)
2014	FK Daugava Rīga	14	(3)
2015	Atletico Monte Azul	12	(0)
2015	FK Daugava Rīga	15	(3)
2015–2016	Formiga	6	(4)
2016–2017	Sete de Dourados	0	(0)
2019–	Araguaia Atlético Clube	1	(0)
- * Club domestic league appearances and goals as of 29 June 2019

Vitor Coutinho Flora, known as Vitor Flora (born 21 February 1990) is a Brazilian professional footballer who plays as a striker and attacking midfielder for Araguaia Atlético Clube.

== Career ==
Vitor Flora was born São Joaquim da Barra. In 2008, he moved to Liverpool Reserves. In 2010, he moved to Goiás. In 2011 he moved back to his first club Botafogo SP. In 2014 Flora signed for FK Daugava Rīga and on 9 August 2014 he scored both goals for the club in a 2-1 victory over FK Liepāja. On 7 December 2016, he signed for Sete de Dourados. In March 2019, he signed for Araguaia Atlético Clube.

== Career statistics ==
(Sort of correct as of 29 December 2014)

Club	Season	State League		Brazilian Série A		Copa do Brasil		UEFA Europa League		Total	
Club	Season	Apps	Goals	Apps	Goals	Apps	Goals	Apps	Goals	Apps	Goals
Botafogo de Ribeirão Preto	2007	?	?	-	-	-	-	-	-	?	?
Botafogo de Ribeirão Preto	2008	?	?	-	-	-	-	-	-	?	?
Goiás	2010	0	0	0	0	0	0	-	-	0	0
FK Daugava Riga	2014	14	3	-	-	-	-	2	0	16	3
Total		14	3	0	0	0	0	2	0	16	3
