= Ilias Iliaskos =

Greek footballer

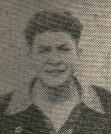
- Ilias Iliaskos

Personal information
- Full name: Ilias Iliaskos
- Date of birth: 1910
- Place of birth: Constantinople, Ottoman Empire
- Date of death: 2005 (aged 94–95)
- Place of death: Athens, Greece
- Position: Forward

Senior career*
Years	Team	Apps	(Gls)
1926–1933	AEK Athens	30	(10)

International career
1932	Greece	1	(0)
- * Club domestic league appearances and goals

Ilias Iliaskos (Greek: Ηλίας Ηλιάσκος; 1910 – 2005) was a Greek footballer who played as a forward. He spent his entire career playing for AEK Athens, helping it win their first major trophy, the 1931–32 Greek Cup, before retiring at the age of 25 to pursue a career in education. He later served at the Allied Headquarters in Cairo during World War II and spent several decades as a teacher and administrator at Athens College.

== Early life ==
Iliaskos was born in Constantinople in 1910. Following the Greco-Turkish population exchange, his family settled in Athens in 1925. He completed his secondary education at the Athens College, where he was the school's first enrolled student. He graduated in 1929 as the class Salutatorian, before enrolling at the Panteion University. Alongside his studies, Iliaskos distinguished himself in athletics. Although he was an accomplished swimmer, he ultimately focused on football.

== Club career ==
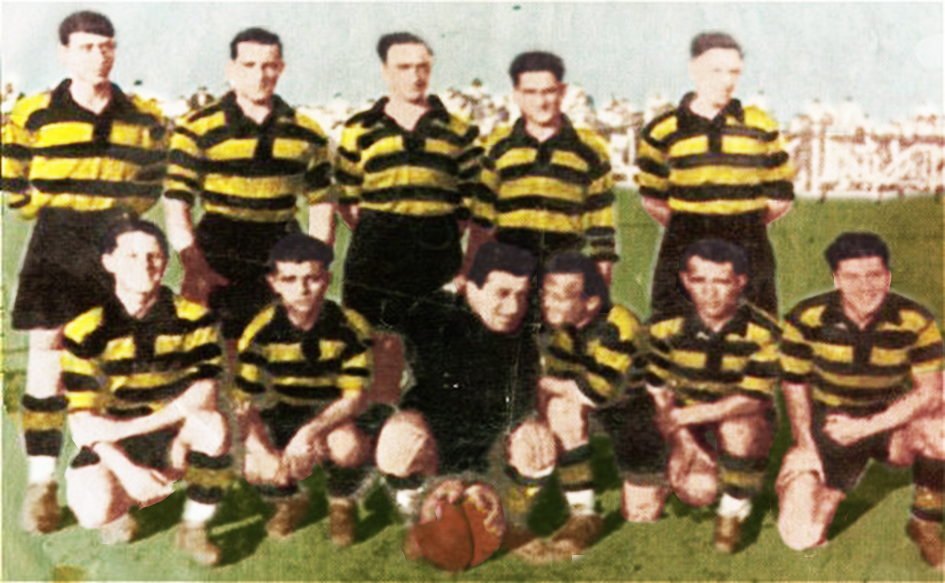
AEK at 1932 Cup.

In 1926 Iliaskos joined AEK Athens, the club founded by refugees from Constantinople. Despite his young age, he quickly established himself as a first-team player. Primarily deployed as a left winger, he was capable of playing in every forward position except centre-forward, during an era when Greek clubs commonly employed the 2–3–5 "Pyramid" formation. During his time with the club, he scored 68 goals in official competitions, making him the club's second-highest goalscorer of the period behind Kostas Negrepontis. In 1931 Iliaskos played a decisive role in the semi-final of the Greek Cup, scoring against PAOK. On 8 November he also scored the first of the five goals of his team in the first Cup final, defeating Aris with 5–3. That was the first title of the club in their seven years of existence. However, in 1933, despite being an international, Iliaskos retired as a footballer at the age of only 25, in order to devote himself to his professional career in education.

== International career ==
Iliaskos played in one match for Greece on 27 March 1932 in a friendly 1–2 defeat against Bulgaria, at Leoforos Alexandras Stadium.

== Personal life ==
After graduating from Panteion University, Iliaskos joined the Athens College. He initially served as secretary before becoming an English teacher, later heading the English department of the primary school and serving in various administrative positions. As an educator, he authored a series of English-language textbooks titled "Use Your English". After retiring from football, he devoted his career to education.

During World War II, following the Battle of Crete in 1941, Iliaskos with his brother and the remaining elements of the Greek Army, fled to the Middle East, eventually reaching Cairo. There, he served at the Allied Headquarters as a member of the psychological warfare section. He also worked as a news editor and broadcaster, transmitting news bulletins and coded messages intended for resistance organisations in occupied Greece.

After the liberation of Greece, Iliaskos returned to Athens and resumed his duties at Athens College. He remained associated with the institution until his retirement in 1975, serving it in both academic and administrative capacities. In recognition of his contribution to the school, he received the President's Award in 1985. In 2001, the Athens College Alumni Association named him its "First Citizen" and dedicated one of its halls in his honour.

Iliaskos died at the age of 95.

== See also ==
- List of one-club men in association football

== Honours ==
AEK Athens

- Greek Cup: 1931–32

== Bibliography ==
- "The History of AEK", Edition G.X. Alexandris, Athens 1996
- Ethnic Greece's march through time, Papazisi Publications Athens 2001
- The official site of the amateur AEK
- Almanac Pictures Magazine, 1991
