= Giorgos Giamalis =

Greek footballer

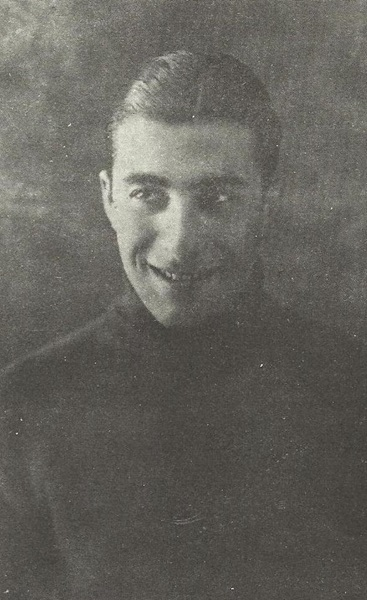
- Giorgos Giamalis

Personal information
- Full name: Georgios Giamalis
- Date of birth: 6 August 1907
- Place of birth: Constantinople, Ottoman Empire
- Date of death: 24 February 1985 (aged 77)
- Place of death: Athens, Greece
- Height: 1.75 m (5 ft 9 in)
- Position: Goalkeeper

Youth career
- 1920−1925: Hefestos Constantinople
- 1925−1926: AEK Athens

Senior career*
Years	Team	Apps	(Gls)
1926−1932	AEK Athens	15	(0)
Total		15	(0)

International career
1929–1932	Greece	10	(0)
- * Club domestic league appearances and goals

Giorgos Giamalis (Greek: Γιώργος Γιάμαλης; 6 August 1907 – 24 February 1985) was a Greek footballer who played as a goalkeeper. He was nicknamed "Valentino", after Rudolph Valentino, as he was a charmer of women at the time.

== Club career ==
=== Early career ===
Giamalis started his career at Hefestos Constantinople in 1920. He was also playing in the team of the Robertian school where he studied from 1922 to 1925. He initially competed in the midfielder and in defence when in Autumn 1924 the goalkeeper of the team wasn't able to compete and Giamalis took his place. From that day on he established himself in this position. At the Robertio school he also participated in the 400-meter track team.

=== AEK Athens ===
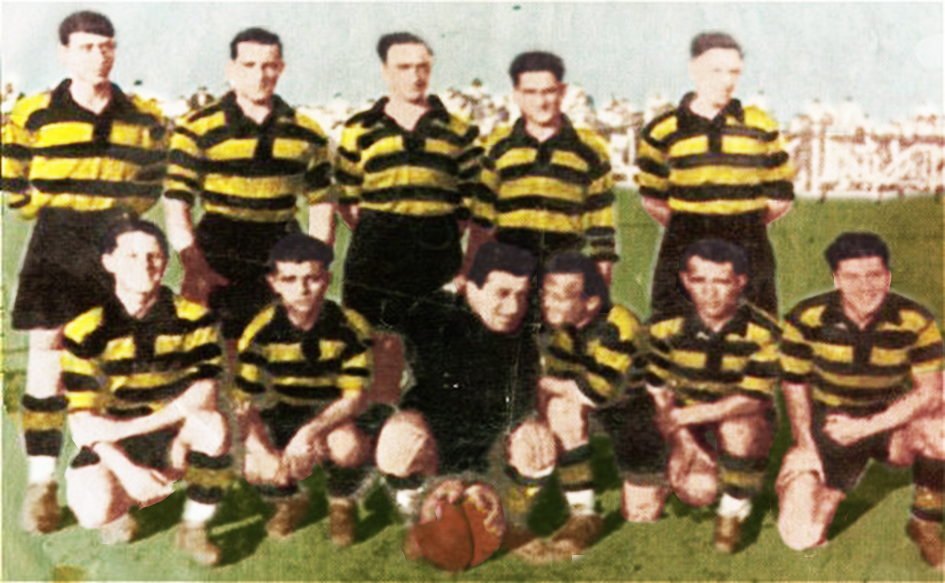
AEK at 1932 Cup.

In 1925 he traveled to Greece and joined AEK Athens, due to his origin. In the following year he was established as the first choice goalkeeper. He was known for his morals, as in 1927, in a match between AEK and Olympiacos, Georgios Andrianopoulos scored a goal, but the ball had gone through a hole in the nets, without anyone noticing except Giamalis who ran to the referee and asked him to count the goal, as he had seen the ball going through the net. Immediately Andrianopoulos, who was also captain of Olympiacos, asked the referee to stop the match and called his teammates to the center of the pitch, to congratulate him and applaud Giamalis.

In April 1930 in a derby against Panathinaikos he scored a goal as he was frustrated of his team losing by 2–1 and the fruitless efforts his teammates to equalize, he took a powerful goal kick that the ball jumped two times in the opponent area and the opposition goalkeeper Argyrakis, in his effort to reach it, he pushed the ball into his net. He was the main goalkeeper of the club and in 1931 he won the first Greek Cup, that was also the first title of the club, defeating Aris with a score of 5–3. In 1932 he decided to quit football, at the age of only 25, as he was tired of the footballer's life.

== International career ==
Giamalis was the first goalkeeper that played for Greece, appearing 10 times, 4 of which as their captain between 1929 and 1932. His debut on 7 April 1929, in the first historical match of Greece against Italy B, at the Leoforos Alexandras Stadium.

== After football ==
After the end of his career as a footballer, Giamalis was involved in track and field at a professional level and worked at PPC, even claiming positions at high ranks.

== Personal life ==
Giamalis was married and had two daughters, Lina and Sofia. He died on 24 February 1985 from acute myocardial infarction. His funeral took place two days later at the cemetery of Palaio Faliro.

== Honours ==
AEK Athens

- Greek Cup: 1931–32

== See also ==
- List of one-club men in association football
