= Emil Rauchmaul =

Hungarian football manager (1891–1968

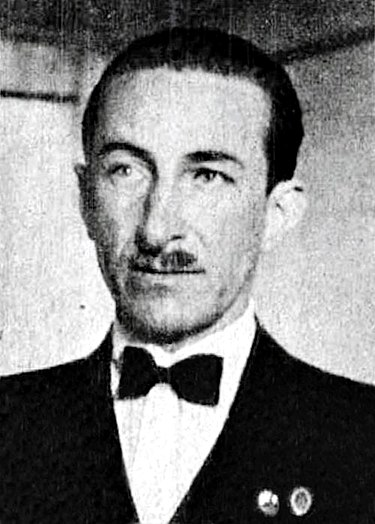
- Emil Rauchmaul in 1938

Personal information
- Date of birth: 19 April 1891
- Place of birth: Budapest, Hungary
- Date of death: 5 April 1968 (aged 76)
- Place of death: Budapest, Hungary
- Position: Midfielder

Senior career*
| Years | Team | Apps | (Gls) |
| 1908–1925 | Budapesti TC | | |

International career
| 1915 | Hungary | 1 | (0) |

Managerial career
- Pogoń Katowice
- 1928–1929: 1. FC Katowice
- 1930–1931: Budapesti TC
- 1931: Bocskai FC
- 1931–1932: AEK Athens
- 1933: Garbarnia Kraków
- 1934–1935: HC Topoľčany
- 1936: 1. SK Prostějov
- 1937: Tatabányai SC
- 1937–1938: Ferencvárosi TC
- 1938–1940: Magyar Pamut
- * Club domestic league appearances and goals

Emil Rauchmaul (19 April 1891 – 5 April 1968) was a Hungarian footballer who played as a midfielder and was later a manager.

== Managerial career ==
=== Ferencváros ===
In the 1937–38 Nemzeti Bajnokság I season, Rauchmaul managed Ferencvárosi TC. His first match was a 3–3 draw against Hungária FC at Hungária körúti stadion on 22 August 1937. His last match was a 5–1 victory over Elektromos FC on 26 May 1938 at Üllői úti stadion. He won the 1937 Mitropa Cup with Ferencváros.

=== AEK Athens ===
In 1931 Rauchmaul moved to Greece and took over as manager of AEK Athens. With Rauchmaul at the bench AEK won their first ever title. On 8 November 1931 in the first Greek Cup final in the history of the institution, they defeated Aris by 5–3 at Leoforos Alexandras Stadium. In the same year, the state-run newspaper "Acropolis" organized a Christmas Cup in Athens with the participation of AEK, Panathinaikos, Olympiacos, Apollon Athens and the Austrian Admira Wacker. AEK also won the "Acropolis Cup" with 4–3, to a surprise of the Austrian fans and became the first team to win two Cups in a season with Asderis as their manager.

== Personal life ==
Rauchmaul was of German descent.

== Honours ==
AEK Athens

- Greek Cup: 1931–32
