= Stefanos Konstantinidis =

Greek footballer

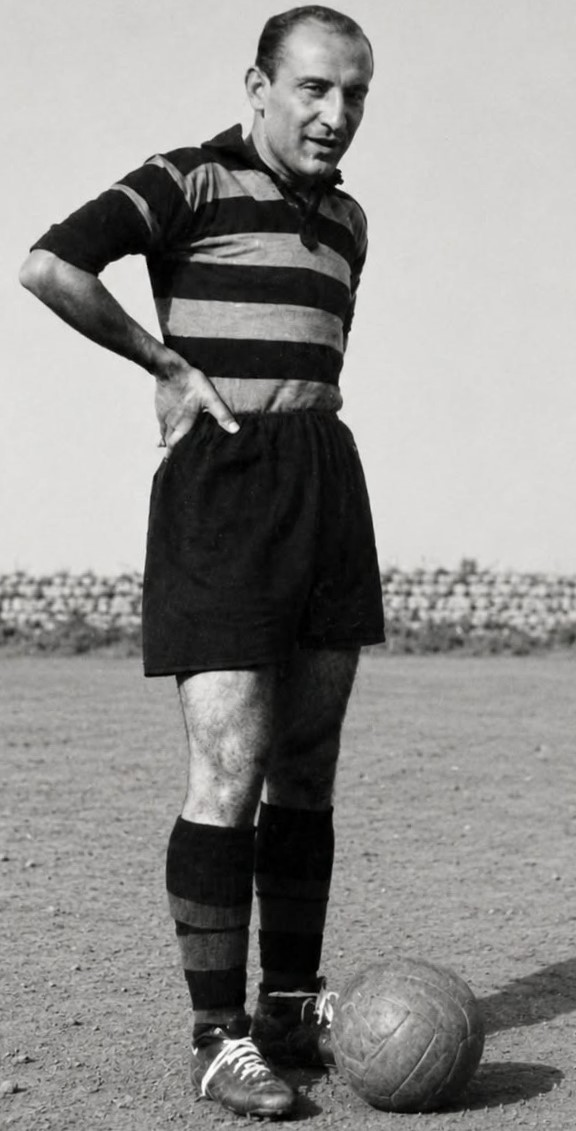
- Stefanos Konstantinidis with AEK Athens

Personal information
- Date of birth: 1905
- Place of birth: Edessa, Ottoman Empire
- Positions: Defender; midfielder

Senior career*
Years	Team	Apps	(Gls)
−1926	Megas Alexandros Edessa		
1926−1934	AEK Athens	0	(0)
1928−1929	Goudi		

International career
1929–1932	Greece	6	(0)
- * Club domestic league appearances and goals

Stefanos Konstantinidis (Greek: Στέφανος Κωνσταντινίδης; 1905 – ?), was a Greek footballer who played as a defender. His nickname was "Picolo".

== Early life ==
Konstantinidis was born in 1905 in Edessa, which at the time was part of the Ottoman Empire. He attended school in the city and began playing football there, initially as a centre-half for local club Megas Alexandros Edessa.

== Club career ==
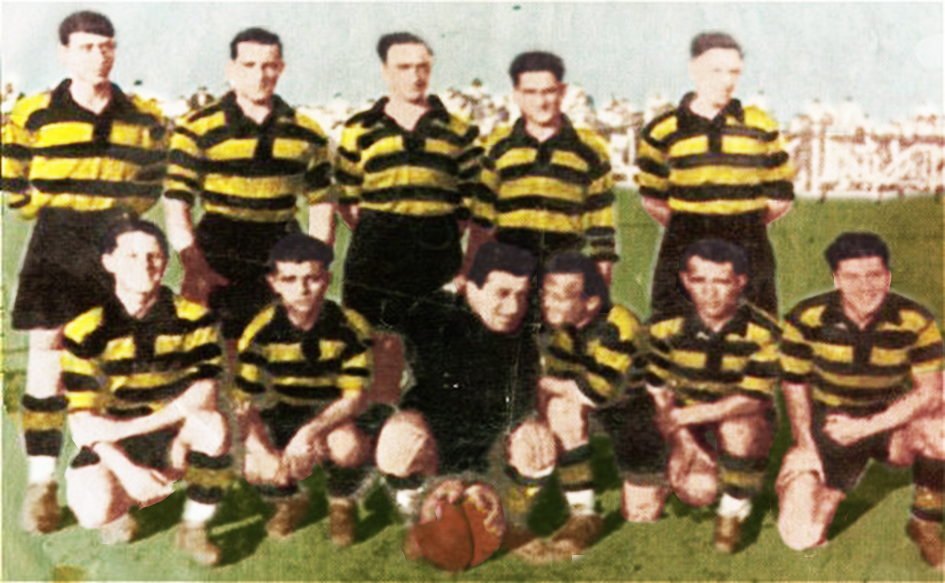
AEK at 1932 Cup.

In 1926, he moved to Athens and joined AEK Athens, where he became part of a team that was beginning to establish itself among the leading clubs in Greek football. Playing a midfielder, Konstantinidis was valued for his technical ability, composure and intelligent distribution and was particularly effective in linking the defence with the attack. His arrival coincided with that of forward Kostas Negrepontis, who had returned to Greece after a distinguished career with Pera Club and in France, and Konstantinidis became an important source of service for the experienced forward.

Konstantinidis remained a regular member of AEK's senior team for most of the following eight years. Despite his large physical build, he was regarded as a technically accomplished player whose reading of the game allowed him to make effective decisions in possession. He also represented the Athens Mixed XI in the Inter-City Cup competitions against the representative teams of Piraeus and Thessaloniki.

In 1928, Konstantinidis briefly left AEK following a disagreement with the club's administration and joined Goudi, accompanied by teammates Mougras and Baltas. The dispute was resolved soon afterwards, and all three players returned to AEK.

He was part of the squad that on 8 November 1931 won the first Greek Cup, that was also the first title for the club, defeating Aris 5–3. His playing time declined from the following season, and he continued with AEK until the end of the 1934, when he retired from football at the age of 29.

== International career ==
Konstantinidis was called and made his debut with Greece on 7 April 1929, in their first ever match, against Italy B, at Leoforos Alexandras Stadium. He played a total of 6 times with the blue and white jersey between 1929 and 1932.

== Honours ==
AEK Athens

- Greek Cup: 1931–32
