= Araguaia Atlético Clube =

Araguaia
- Full name: Araguaia Atlético Clube
- Nickname(s): Pantera do Vale (Valley's Panther)
- Founded: December 1, 1978 (46 years ago)
- Ground: Bilinão, Alto Araguaia, Brazil
- Capacity: 3,000
- President: Marilzan Nunes da Costa
- Head coach: Elizan Barbosa
- League: –
- 2009: Campeonato Brasileiro Série D, eliminated in the quarterfinals
Home colours	Away colours

Araguaia Atlético Clube, also known as Araguaia, are a Brazilian football team from Alto Araguaia, Mato Grosso. They competed in the Série D in 2009.

== History ==
Araguaia Atlético Clube were founded on December 1, 1978. They won the Copa Governador do Mato Grosso in 2008, when they beat União in the final. Araguaia competed in the Série D in 2009, when they were eliminated in the quarterfinals by Chapecoense.

== Stadium ==
Araguaia play their home games at Bilinão. The stadium has a maximum capacity of 3,000 people.

== Achievements ==
- Copa Governador do Mato Grosso:
  - Winners (1): 2008
