= Cacá (footballer, born 1982) =

Brazilian footballer (born 1982)

Personal information
- Full name: Lucas de Deus Santos
- Date of birth: 9 October 1982 (age 44)
- Place of birth: Belo Horizonte, Brazil
- Height: 1.71 m (5 ft 7 in)
- Position: Midfielder

Team information
- Current team: Santo André

Youth career
- 1999: Atlético Mineiro

Senior career*
Years	Team	Apps	(Gls)
2000–2004	Atlético Mineiro	9	(0)
2002	→ Sport (loan)		
2003–2004	→ Duisburg (loan)	15	(0)
2005	CRB	15	(1)
2006–2009	AaB	64	(14)
2009–2011	OB	35	(3)
2011–2012	União Leiria	25	(0)
2013	Operário Ferroviário	14	(2)
2013	Marcílio Dias	6	(0)
2013	Caxias Sul	5	(0)
2014	Comercial	5	(0)
2014–	Santo André	11	(1)
2014	→ São Caetano (loan)	11	(0)

International career
1999	Brazil U17	6	(1)
- * Club domestic league appearances and goals as of 22 February 2015

Lucas de Deus Santos (born 9 October 1982), known as Cacá, is a Brazilian professional footballer who plays for Esporte Clube Santo André as a midfielder.

== Club career ==
Born in Belo Horizonte, Minas Gerais, Cacá started his career with hometown's Clube Atlético Mineiro. During his spell with the Galo, he was also loaned twice: in the 2003–04 season he played with MSV Duisburg in the German second division, being sparingly used as the club finished in seventh position.

In early 2006, Cacá signed with AaB Fodbold from Clube de Regatas Brasil. He only appeared in two Danish Superliga games in his third year due to injury, as the Aalborg side won the national championship after a nine-year wait. Back to full fitness in 2008–09, he helped it reach the final in the Danish Cup; additionally, on 25 November 2008, he scored the 1–1 equalizer in a UEFA Champions League group stage contest against Celtic, in an eventual 2–1 win which saw the hosts leapfrog the Scots for the third place in Group E, with the subsequent qualification to the UEFA Cup.

On 5 July 2009, Cacá moved clubs but stayed in Denmark, signing a three-year contract with Odense BK for around 4 million Danish kroner. In his only full season with the team he contributed with 17 starts and three goals to an eventual second position, which qualified to the Europa League.

Cacá and Odense mutually terminated the player's contract on 14 January 2011. In the last day of the winter transfer window he signed with U.D. Leiria in Portugal, joining a host of compatriots at the top division side.

== International career ==
Cacá played all the games for Brazil at the 1999 FIFA U-17 World Championship in New Zealand, scoring in the quarterfinals against Paraguay (4–1 win) as the national team won the tournament.

== Personal life ==
Cacá's older brothers, Dedé and Leandro, were also footballers. Both shared teams at Atlético Mineiro and Borussia Dortmund, with very different individual fates however.
