= Geraldo (footballer, born 1974) =

Brazilian footballer

Personal information
- Full name: Geraldo Moreira da Silva Júnior
- Date of birth: 6 February 1974 (age 52)
- Place of birth: Duque de Caxias, Brazil
- Height: 1.73 m (5 ft 8 in)
- Position: Attacking midfielder

Senior career*
Years	Team	Apps	(Gls)
1993–1996	Vasco EC		
1996–1997	Confiança		
1997–2000	Vitória de Guimarães	70	(4)
2000–2001	Atlético Paranaense		
2001–2002	Sport		
2002	Bahia		
2002–2005	Al Shabab		
2005–2006	Sport		
2006–2007	Coritiba		
2007–2008	Náutico	46	(25)
2008–2009	Ceará	137	(46)
2009–2010	Itumbiara		
2010–2011	Ceará	38	(8)
2011–2012	Vitória	12	(1)
2012–2013	Fortaleza	44	(17)
2013	Volta Redonda	10	(0)
2013–2014	Icasa	21	(1)
2014–2015	Confiança	32	(5)
2015	Tigres do Brasil	1	(0)
- * Club domestic league appearances and goals

Geraldo Moreira da Silva Júnior, better known as Geraldo (Duque de Caxias, 6 February 1974) is a Brazilian former professional footballer who played as an attacking midfielder.

== Career ==
Gerard served in several clubs: Vasco EC (Sergipe), Confiança, Vitória de Guimarães, Atlético Paranaense, Bahia, Al Shabab, Sport, Coritiba and Náutico.

Arriving at Náutico, caused controversy because he had been the idol of archrival Sport in 2001, but was dismissed in 2005 for being below expectations on the field.

In 2009, he was hired by the Ceará to the disputes of the League of Ceará, Ceará, where he led the runner-up, even more so in the same year one of the biggest victory of the athlete, got together with group players focused on the goal that was to take the Ceará the elite of Brazilian football and do not reach (club and athlete) to a financial arrangement for the Geraldo will Itumbiara.

In 2010, Itumbiara played in the Campeonato Goiano and was not any better in their presentations; the team was not going well until Ceará hired Geraldo to try to repair their midfield, which had failed in the 2010 World Cup squads.
