= Capitão (footballer) =

Brazilian footballer (born 1966)

Personal information
- Full name: Oleúde José Ribeiro
- Date of birth: 19 September 1966 (age 60)
- Place of birth: Conselheiro Pena, Brazil
- Height: 1.75 m (5 ft 9 in)
- Position: Midfielder

Senior career*
Years	Team	Apps	(Gls)
1986–1988	Cascavel		
1988–1993	Portuguesa		
1994	Verdy Kawasaki	18	(0)
1995–1997	Portuguesa		
1998	São Paulo		
1999	Grêmio		
2000	Guarani		
2000	Portuguesa Santista		
2001	Botafogo-SP		
2002	Sport		
2002–2004	Portuguesa		
2005	Mauaense		
- * Club domestic league appearances and goals

Oleúde José Ribeiro (born 19 September 1966), known as Capitão, is a Brazilian former professional footballer who played as a defensive midfielder for several Série A clubs.

== Career ==
Born in Conselheiro Pena, he started his professional career in 1986, defending Cascavel, leaving the club two years later to play for Portuguesa. After leaving Lusa in 1993, Capitão was transferred to Japan, where he defended Verdy Kawasaki in 1994. He had his second stint with Portuguesa from 1995 to 1997, helping the club finish as the 1996 Série A runner-up. Capitão won the 1998 Campeonato Paulista with São Paulo, and the 1999 Campeonato Gaúcho with Grêmio. After playing for Guarani and Portuguesa Santista, in 2000, and for Botafogo-SP and Sport respectively in 2001 and in 2002, he returned to Portuguesa, retiring in 2004.

== Club statistics ==
Club performance			League		Cup		League Cup		Total	
Season	Club	League	Apps	Goals	Apps	Goals	Apps	Goals	Apps	Goals
Japan			League		Emperor's Cup		J.League Cup		Total	
1994	Verdy Kawasaki	J1 League	18	0	1	0	0	0	19	0
Total			18	0	1	0	0	0	19	0

== Honors ==
Verdy Kawasaki

- Japan Soccer League: 1994

Portuguesa

- Torneio Início Paulista: 1996

Grêmio

- Campeonato Gaúcho: 1999
- Copa Sul: 1999

São Paulo

- Campeonato Paulista: 1998
