= Wellington Amorim =

Brazilian footballer (born 1977)

Personal information
- Full name: Wellington Gonçalves Amorim
- Date of birth: January 23, 1977 (age 49)
- Place of birth: Belo Horizonte, Brazil
- Height: 1.76 m (5 ft 9 in)
- Position: Forward

Senior career*
Years	Team	Apps	(Gls)
1997–1998	Villa Nova		
1999–2001	Atlético Mineiro		
2000	→ América Mineiro (loan)		
2001	→ Villa Nova (loan)		
2002	Sport Recife		
2003	Ipatinga		
2004–2007	Marília		
2005–2006	→ Pohang Steelers (loan)	12	(2)
2006	→ São Caetano (loan)		
2007–2008	Figueirense		
2009	Guaratinguetá	0	(0)
2009–2010	Ceará	48	(6)
2011	Mirassol		
2011	Fortaleza	6	(0)
2011	Nacional de Nova Serrana		
2012–2013	Ferroviária		
2014–2015	Marília		
- * Club domestic league appearances and goals as of 12 January 2011

Wellington Gonçalves Amorim (born January 23, 1977), called as Wellington Amorim, is a Brazilian football striker.

== Career ==
His previous clubs include Villa Nova-MG, Atlético Mineiro, América-MG, Sport Recife, Ipatinga-MG, Marília-SP, Pohang Steelers in South Korea, São Caetano-SP, Figueirense-SC, Guaratinguetá-SP, Ceará, Mirassol and Fortaleza.
