= Gaúcho (footballer, born 1980) =

Brazilian association football player

Personal information
- Full name: Márcio Rodrigo Trombetta
- Date of birth: July 6, 1980 (age 45)
- Place of birth: Coronel Vivida, Brazil
- Height: 1.84 m (6 ft 0 in)
- Position: Defender

Senior career*
Years	Team	Apps	(Gls)
2000	Grêmio		
2000–2001	Juventus		
2001–2004	Recife		
2004–2005	Atlético Mineiro		
2005–2006	Portuguesa		
2006–2008	Naval		
2008–2009	Fortaleza		
2009–2010	ABC		
2010–2011	Fortaleza		
2012	Shahrdari Tabriz		
2012	Guarany		
2012	ASA		
- * Club domestic league appearances and goals

Márcio Rodrigo Trombetta (born on 6, July, 1980), known as Gaúcho, is a Brazilian former professional footballer who played as a defender for clubs in Brazil and Iran between 1999 and 2012.
