= São Domingos Futebol Clube =

São Domingos
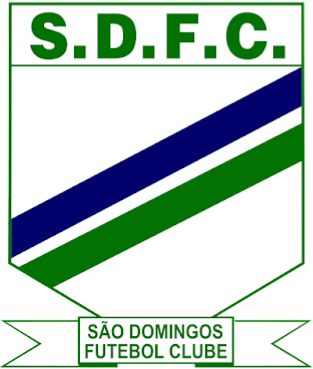
- Full name: São Domingos Futebol Clube
- Nickname(s): Coelho do Agreste; Tricolor da Terra da Farinha
- Founded: 11 November 2004; 20 years ago
- Dissolved: 28 November 2012; 12 years ago
- Ground: Estádio Arnaldo Pereira, São Domingos, Sergipe state, Brazil
- Capacity: 2,000
- Website: http://www.saodomingosfc.com.br
Home colors	Away colors

São Domingos Futebol Clube, commonly known as São Domingos, was a Brazilian football club based in São Domingos, Sergipe state. They competed in the Copa do Brasil twice.

== History ==
The club was founded on November 11, 2004. São Domingos won the Copa Governador do Estado de Sergipe in 2009, and in 2010. São Domingos faced Sampaio Corrêa in the First Round of the 2010 Copa do Brasil, in the first leg, at Batistão, the game ended in a 1-1 draw. However, in the second leg, played at Estádio Nhozinho Santos, the club was eliminated after being defeated 2-1. They are facing Bahia in the 2011 edition of the Copa do Brasil.

== Honours ==
- Copa Governo do Estado de Sergipe
  - Winners (2): 2009, 2010
- Taça Estado de Sergipe
  - Winners (1): 2011

== Stadium ==
São Domingos Futebol Clube played their home games at Estádio Arnaldo Pereira. The stadium has a maximum capacity of 2,000 people.
