= Alto Araguaia =

- Municipality
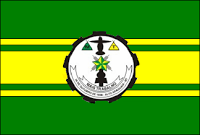
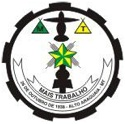
- Flag Coat of arms

- Location in Mato Grosso state

- Location in Brazil
- Coordinates: 17°19′0″S 53°12′0″W
- Country: Brazil
- Region: Central-West
- State: Mato Grosso

Area
  - Total: 5,515 km^{2} (2,129 sq mi)

Population (2020)
  - Total: 19,385
  - Density: 3.515/km^{2} (9.104/sq mi)
- Time zone: UTC−3 (BRT)

Alto Araguaia is a city in the state of Mato Grosso in Brazil. Its population is 19,385 (2020) and its total area is 5,515 km^{2}.
