= Jacek Gmoch =

Polish footballer, manager, trainer, and team selector (born 1939)

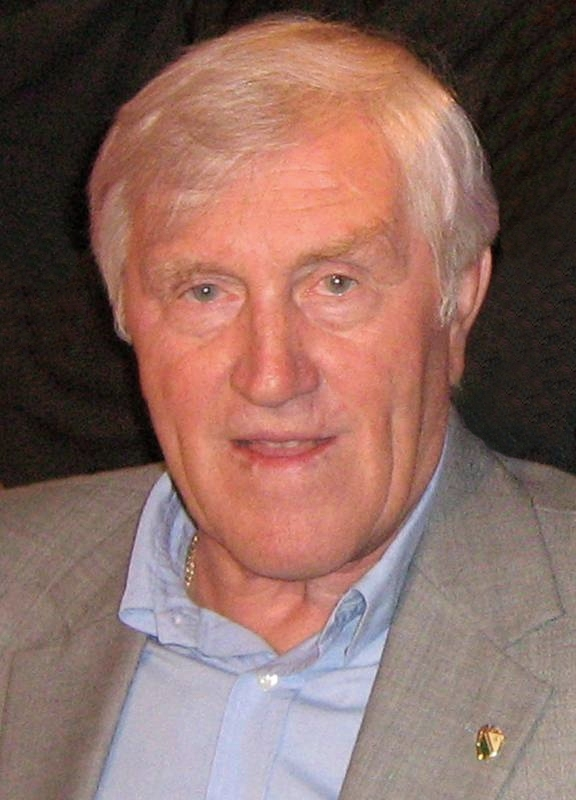
- Gmoch in 2007

Personal information
- Full name: Jacek Wojciech Gmoch
- Date of birth: 13 January 1939 (age 87)
- Place of birth: Pruszków, Poland
- Height: 1.79 m (5 ft 10 in)
- Position: Defender

Senior career*
Years	Team	Apps	(Gls)
1953–1960	Znicz Pruszków		
1960–1968	Legia Warsaw	330	(10)

International career
1962–1968	Poland	29	(0)

Managerial career
- 1969–1971: Legia Warsaw (assistant)
- 1971–1974: Poland (assistant)
- 1976–1978: Poland
- 1979: Skeid Fotball
- 1979–1981: PAS Giannina
- 1981–1982: Apollon Athens
- 1982–1983: AEL
- 1983–1985: Panathinaikos
- 1985–1986: AEK Athens
- 1986–1988: AEL
- 1988–1989: Olympiacos
- 1990–1991: Aris
- 1991–1993: APOEL
- 1993: AEL
- 1994–1995: Athinaikos
- 1995–1996: Ethnikos
- 1996–1997: APOEL
- 1997–1998: Ionikos
- 1998–1999: Kalamata
- 1999–2000: Panionios
- 2002–2003: Ionikos
- 2010: Panathinaikos (caretaker)
- * Club domestic league appearances and goals

Jacek Wojciech Gmoch (born 13 January 1939 in Pruszków) is a Polish former professional footballer, manager, and commentator. As a player he spent the majority of his career playing for Legia Warsaw as a defender, and represented Poland 29 times internationally. After a career-ending injury he became a successful trainer, winning multiple titles in Poland, Greece, and Cyprus, while also managing the Poland National Team.

While having a successful football career at Legia, he simultaneously graduated in communication from the Warsaw University of Technology. Gmoch began his career playing for his local childhood club Znicz Pruszków in 1953. After an impressive spell he earned a move to Legia Warsaw, where he went on to have a successful career playing over 300 games. With Legia, he won the Polish Cup twice (in 1964 and 1966) and contributed to the beginning of the successful Championship winning 1968–69 season. He also became a regular player for the National Team of Poland during this period (29 caps).

Following a major injury in a friendly match, Gmoch began his coaching career, starting as assistant manager for Legia Warsaw between 1969 and 1971, achieving another Polish Championship in 1969-70, and reaching the semi-final of the European Champion Clubs’ Cup in the same season. While, in 1970-71 Legia finished runner’s up of Poland, and reached the quarter-finals of the European Champions Clubs’ Cup losing to Atlético Madrid. Shortly thereafter he was offered the Poland National Team assistant's job by Kazimierz Górski, lasting from 1971 to 1974. Together they achieved an Olympic Gold medal in Munich 1972, as well as third place in the 1974 World Cup, which to this day are considered to be Poland’s greatest football achievements. After the World Cup in 1974 he left the National team and moved to the U.S. to pursue his scientific career at the University of Pennsylvania (1975–1976). However, he quickly returned to international football in 1976 being offered the coach’s job of the National Team of Poland after Górski left. He qualified for the 1978 Mundial in Argentina by finishing first in his qualifying group against Portugal, Denmark, and Cyprus. During the World Cup, he reached the second round where ultimately Poland finished fifth in the final rankings, only losing to Brazil, and eventual winners and hosts Argentina. After the 1978 World Cup he stepped down from the Poland job, moving to Norway, Cyprus, and Greece where he became one of the most successful and recognised coaches.

In Norway, he became the manager of Skeid Fotball in 1979, where he saved the team from relegation in his one and only season as head coach. Next, he went to Greece and first worked as a manager of PAS Giannina between 1979 and 1981, earning sixth place in his first season. He joined Apollon Athens in 1981-82 and AEL in 1982-83, where he finished runner up in the Greek league, the first time a provincial team managed this feat. Subsequently, in 1983 he made his big step as a manager and became trainer of Panathinaikos. In his first season as Panathinaikos manager in 1983-84, his team won the Double and the following season in 1984-85, his team finished runner up in the league, and for the second time in their history, reached the semi-finals of the European Champion Clubs’ Cup, where they were eliminated by Liverpool. Despite this success, the Panathinaikos management fired him at the end of the season. According to newspapers of the time, one of the reasons he was fired was because he did not tolerate interference in the team by the management.

For the 1985–86 season, he became coach of another great Greek club, AEK Athens finishing third, and the following season he again became coach of Larisa. In 1987-88, his team historically won their only Greek Championship, until today the only team outside of Athens and Thessaloniki to do so. After Larisa, he worked as the manager of Olympiacos in 1988-89, again finishing as runner up in the league, and Aris Thessaloniki between 1990 and 1991. In 1991 he went to Cyprus to become APOEL trainer, where his team won the Championship, Cup, and Super Cup. He remained there until the middle of the 1992-93 season. Later, he worked for Athinaikos (1994–95), Ethnikos Piraeus (1995–96), APOEL (1996-97) winning another Super Cup and qualifying for the UEFA Cup, Ionikos (1997–98) finishing a club record fifth place in the league, Kalamata (1998–99) securing promotion to the top flight, Panionios (1999), and again for Ionikos in 2002–03.

After retiring from management he acted as a member of the Polish Olympic representation team in the Athens 2004 Summer Olympics. Later he also became a minor shareholder and President of Legia Warsaw, as well as following up a career in television commentating for several networks. He notably commentated Champions League matches for the Greek Television ERT, as well as International Tournaments in Poland for channels Polsat and TVP.

On 15 November 2010, Gmoch took over as the caretaker manager of Panathinaikos, following Nikos Nioplias, who resigned after a string of mediocre results in the first part of the 2010–11 season. As caretaker manager he won against Iraklis in his only final match before being succeeded by the new manager of the team, Jesualdo Ferreira. The game ended 4–2, despite Iraklis taking a 0-2 lead in the first half, and when the game ended the stadium crowd applauded him to thank him for everything he had done for the club.

== Managerial statistics ==
As of 21 November 2010

Managerial record by team and tenure

Team	Nation	From	To	Record				
Team	Nation	From	To	G	W	D	L	Win%
Poland	(Poland)	16 October 1976	6 September 1978	27	17	3	7	62.96
PAS Giannina	(Greece)	4 December 1979	30 June 1981	63	25	15	23	39.68
AEL	(Greece)	1 July 1982	30 June 1983	35	18	9	8	51.43
Panathinaikos	(Greece)	1 July 1983	19 June 1985	88	56	22	10	63.64
AEK	(Greece)	1 July 1985	23 May 1986	41	19	12	10	46.34
AEL	(Greece)	1 July 1986	2 May 1988	76	37	14	25	48.68
Olympiacos	(Greece)	1 June 1988	8 March 1989	26	15	6	5	57.69
Aris	(Greece)	29 January 1990	16 April 1991	57	20	18	19	35.09
APOEL	(Cyprus)	1 July 1991	30 April 1993	67	40	16	11	59.70
AEL	(Greece)	1 July 1993	1 November 1993	15	7	3	5	46.67
APOEL	(Cyprus)	1 July 1996	28 February 1997	27	18	3	6	66.67
Ionikos	(Greece)	4 March 1997	30 June 1998	49	23	12	14	46.94
Panathinaikos	(Greece)	15 November 2010	21 November 2010	1	1	0	0	100.00
Total				572	296	133	143	51.75

== Honours ==
=== Player ===
Legia Warsaw

- Ekstraklasa: 1968-69
- Ekstraklasa runner-up: 1960, 1967-68
- Polish Cup: 1964, 1966

=== Assistant Manager ===
Legia Warsaw

- Ekstraklasa: 1969-70
- Ekstraklasa runner up: 1970-71
- European Cup Semi Finals: 1969-70
- European Cup Quarter Finals: 1970-71
- Polish Cup: 1972-73

Poland

- Summer Olympics Gold: 1972
- FIFA World Cup 3rd place: 1974

=== Manager ===
Poland

- FIFA World Cup 5th place: 1978

AEL

- Super League Greece: 1987-88
- Super League Greece runner-up: 1982-83

Panathinaikos

- Super League Greece: 1983-84
- Super League Greece runner-up: 1984-85
- Greek Cup: 1983-84
- European Cup semi-finals: 1984-85

Olympiacos

- Super League Greece runner-up: 1988-89

APOEL

- Cypriot First Division: 1991-92
- Cypriot Cup: 1992-93
- Cypriot Super Cup: 1992-93, 1996–97
