= São Domingos, Sergipe =

Municipality in Sergipe, Brazil

Coordinates: 10°47′27″S 37°34′04″W

- Municipality
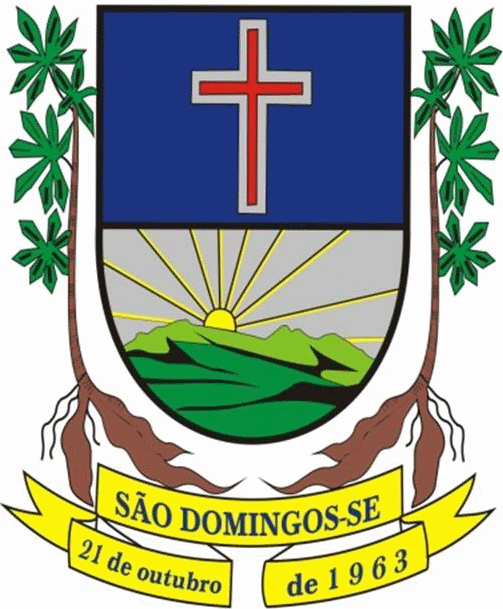
- Flag Coat of arms
- Interactive map of São Domingos, Sergipe
- Country: Brazil
- Time zone: UTC−3 (BRT)

São Domingos (Brazilian Portuguese pronunciation: [ˈsɐ̃w dʊˈmĩɡʊs]) is a municipality located in the Brazilian state of Sergipe. Its population was 11,207 (2020) and its area is 102 km^{2}.

== See also ==
- List of municipalities in Sergipe
