= 1931–32 Greek Football Cup =

1931–32 Greek Cup
Tournament details
- Country: Greece
- Teams: 17

Final positions
- Champions: AEK Athens (1st title)
- Runners-up: Aris

Tournament statistics
- Matches played: 15
- Goals scored: 82 (5.47 per match)
- Top goal scorer(s): Nikos Kitsos (8 goals)

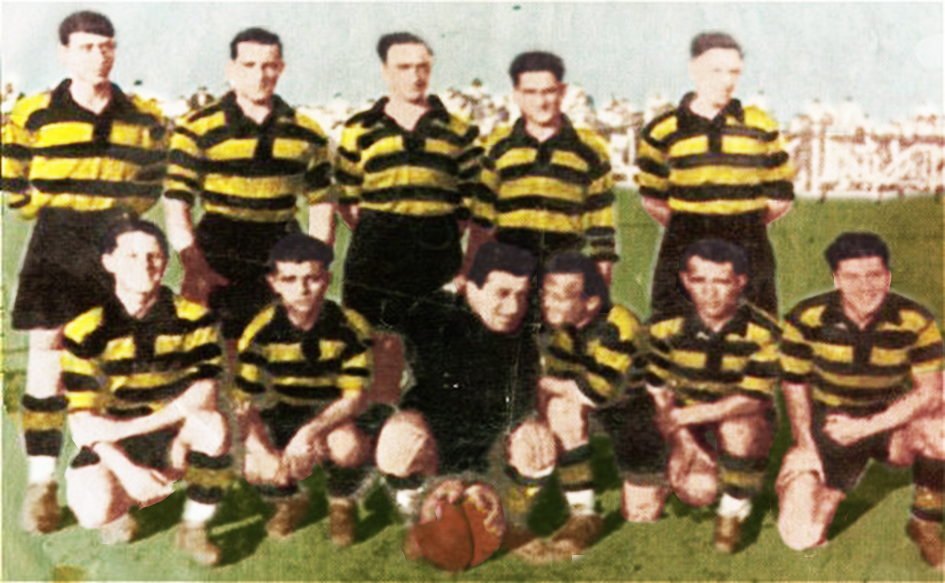
AEK FC, winners of the 1932 Cup

The 1931–32 Greek Football Cup was the first edition of the Greek Football Cup. All matches took place within 1931 and before the start of the national and local championships. The competition culminated with the Greek Cup final, held at Leoforos Alexandras Stadium, on 8 November 1931. The match was contested by AEK Athens and Aris, with AEK Athens winning by 5–3.

== Calendar ==
Round	Date(s)	Fixtures	Clubs	New entries
Qualification round	13 September 1931	3	17 → 13	8
Round of 16	20, 27 September 1931	5	13 → 8	9
Quarter-finals	27 September 1931	4	8 → 4	none
Semi-finals	18 October 1931	2	4 → 2	none
Final	8 November 1931	1	2 → 1	none

== Qualification round ==
Team 1	Score	Team 2
Atromitos	4–0	Asteras Athens
Amyna Piraeus	7–1	AO Palaio Faliro
Piraikos Neo Faliro	2–0 (w/o)	Goudi
Meliteus	3–0	Megas Alexandros

== Knockout phase ==
In the knockout phase, teams played a single match against each other. If the match ended in a draw, extra time was played and if the match remained a draw at the end of the extra time a replay match was set. That procedure was repeated until a winner emerged. There were no seedings, any two teams could be drawn against each other.

== Bracket ==
Round of 16
AEK Athens	2
Piraikos Neo Faliro	0
Ethnikos Piraeus (bye)
Iraklis (a.e.t.)	3
Thermaikos	2
PAOK	3
Meliteus	0
Olympiacos	4
Atromitos	1
Apollon Athens (bye)
Aris (bye)
Panathinaikos	6
Amyna Piraeus	1

Quarter-finals
AEK Athens	4
Ethnikos Piraeus	0
Iraklis	2
PAOK	3
Olympiacos	0
Apollon Athens	1
Aris	7
Panathinaikos	2

Semi-finals
AEK Athens	2
PAOK	1
Apollon Athens	2
Aris	3

Final
AEK Athens	5
Aris	3

== Round of 16 ==
Team 1	Score	Team 2
Olympiacos	4–1	Atromitos
Panathinaikos	6–1	Amyna Piraeus
AEK Athens	2–0	Piraikos Neo Faliro
PAOK	3–0	Meliteus
Iraklis	3–2 (a.e.t.)	Thermaikos
Apollon Athens	bye	
Ethnikos Piraeus	bye	
Aris	bye	

== Quarter-finals ==
Team 1	Score	Team 2
AEK Athens	4–0	Ethnikos Piraeus
Olympiacos	0–1	Apollon Athens
Aris	7–2	Panathinaikos
Iraklis	2–3	PAOK

== Semi-finals ==
Team 1	Score	Team 2
AEK Athens	2–1	PAOK
Apollon Athens	2–3	Aris

== Final ==
8 November 1931
14:30 EET

AEK Athens	5–3	Aris
Iliaskos 5'; Baltas 8', 65'; Oikonomou 70' (o.g.); Negrepontis 78'	Report	Kitsos 40', 43', 80'

Leoforos Alexandras Stadium, Athens
Attendance: 10,000
Referee: Sotiris Asprogerakas (Athens)
