= 2013 Campeonato Sergipano =

Campeonato Sergipano de Futebol
- Season: 2013
- Champions: Sergipe
- Relegated: Boca Júnior; América-SE
- Copa do Brasil: Sergipe; River Plate
- Série D: Sergipe
- Matches played: 120
- Goals scored: 277 (2.31 per match)
- Top goalscorer: Leandro Kivel (River Plate) - 10 goals

The 2013 Campeonato Sergipano de Futebol was the 90th edition of the Sergipe's top professional football league. The competition began on January 13, and ended on May 19. Sergipe won the championship by the 33rd time, while Boca Júnior and América-SE were relegated.

== Format ==
All teams except Confiança and Itabaiana are split in two groups. Each team plays twice against the other teams in the same group. The two best teams in each group advances to the semifinal. The teams who win the semifinals then advance to the final. The team who wins the final is the champion of the first stage, which is called Copa Governo do Estado de Sergipe.

On the second stage, the eight teams are joined by Confiança and Itabaiana, who were playing in the 2013 Copa do Nordeste. The ten teams play against each other in a double round-robin. The four best teams advance to the semifinals. The semifinals and the finals are played in two legs. The two worst teams in this stage are relegated.

=== Qualifications ===
The winner of the first stage and the champion qualifies to the 2014 Copa do Brasil. The champion also qualify to the 2013 Campeonato Brasileiro Série D.

== Participating teams ==
Club	Home city	2012 result
América-SE	Propriá	1st (2nd division)
Boca Júnior	Estância	3rd (2nd division)
Confiança	Aracaju	2nd
Itabaiana	Itabaiana	1st
Estanciano	Estância	2nd (2nd division)
Lagarto	Lagarto	6th
Olímpico	Itabaianinha	8th
River Plate	Carmópolis	4th
Sergipe	Aracaju	7th
Socorrense	Nossa Senhora do Socorro	5th

== First stage ==
=== Group A ===
Pos	Team	Pld	W	D	L	GF	GA	GD	Pts	Qualification
1	Sergipe	6	4	2	0	9	1	+8	14	Advanced to stage's finals
2	Olímpico	6	2	2	2	5	4	+1	8	Advanced to stage's finals
3	Boca Júnior-SE	8	2	1	5	8	4	+4	7	
4	América-SE	6	1	1	4	2	8	−6	4	

==== Results ====
Home \ Away	AMS	BOC	OLI	SER
América-SE		1–2	0–0	0–3
Boca Júnior-SE	0–1		0–2	0–0
Olímpico	2–0	1–2		0–2
Sergipe	1–0	3–1	0–0	

Legend: Blue = home team win; Yellow = draw; Red = away team win.

=== Group B ===
Pos	Team	Pld	W	D	L	GF	GA	GD	Pts	Qualification
1	River Plate-SE	6	3	1	2	8	6	+2	10	Advanced to stage's finals
2	Lagarto	6	2	4	0	8	4	+4	10	Advanced to stage's finals
3	Socorrense	6	1	3	2	4	6	−2	6	
4	Estanciano	6	1	2	3	5	9	−4	5	

Rules for classification: 1) points; 2) goal difference; 3) number of goals scored.

==== Results ====
Home \ Away	EST	LAG	RIV	SOC
Estanciano		0–0	0–1	1–1
Lagarto	3–1		1–1	1–1
River Plate-SE	3–1	1–3		2–0
Socorrense	1–2	0–0	1–0	

Legend: Blue = home team win; Yellow = draw; Red = away team win.

=== Playoffs ===
Semifinals
Sergipe	2
Lagarto	1
River Plate	1
Olímpico	0

Finals
Sergipe	1	1	2
River Plate	0	1	1

==== Semifinals ====
February 6, 2013
20:00 UTC−03:00

Sergipe	2–1	Lagarto
Nivaldo 14'; Leandro 28'		Carlos 41'

Batistão, Aracaju
Referee: Vinicius Tavares Moura

February 6, 2013
20:00 UTC−03:00

River Plate	1–0	Olímpico
Robson 85'

Estádio Fernando França, Carmópolis
Referee: Wendell Oliveira

==== Finals ====
February 14, 2013
20:15 UTC−03:00

River Plate	0–1	Sergipe
		Rodrigo 54'

Estádio Fernando França, Carmópolis
Referee: Rogério Lima da Rocha

February 17, 2013
16:00 UTC−03:00

Sergipe	1–1	River Plate
David 29'		Leandro Kivel 10'

Estádio Fernando França, Carmópolis
Referee: Claudionor dos Santos Júnior

== Second stage ==
=== Standings ===
Pos	Team	Pld	W	D	L	GF	GA	GD	Pts	Qualification or relegation
1	Sergipe	18	10	5	3	27	12	+15	35	Advanced to the Final stage
2	River Plate-SE	18	9	4	5	30	16	+14	31	Advanced to the Final stage
3	Confiança	18	9	4	5	24	18	+6	31	Advanced to the Final stage
4	Estanciano	18	9	3	6	25	21	+4	30	Advanced to the Final stage
5	Socorrense	18	8	4	6	24	19	+5	28	
6	Olímpico	18	6	4	8	24	32	−8	22	
7	Lagarto	18	6	3	9	15	22	−7	21	
8	Itabaiana	18	4	6	8	18	20	−2	18	
9	Boca Júnior-SE (R)	18	4	6	8	18	27	−9	18	Relegated
10	América-SE (R)	18	3	5	10	13	31	−18	14	Relegated

Rules for classification: 1) points; 2) goal difference; 3) number of goals scored.
(R) Relegated

=== Results ===
Home \ Away	AMS	BOC	CON	ITA	EST	LAG	OLI	RIV	SER	SOC
América-SE		0–0	0–1	1–3	2–1	1–1	0–0	1–6	0–1	0–2
Boca Júnior-SE	4–3		2–2	1–0	2–2	0–2	3–0	0–0	0–0	3–2
Confiança	3–0	1–0		0–1	2–1	1–0	1–0	0–1	0–1	2–1
Itabaiana	0–0	5–0	2–2		2–3	1–1	0–1	0–0	1–1	0–1
Estanciano	2–1	1–0	3–2	2–1		0–1	0–1	1–2	1–0	0–0
Lagarto	0–1	1–0	1–0	0–1	0–3		2–3	0–3	1–0	2–1
Olímpico	0–2	0–0	2–2	3–0	1–2	4–2		2–4	1–5	2–2
River Plate-SE	4–1	2–1	1–2	0–0	2–0	2–1	0–1		0–1	1–2
Sergipe	3–0	4–1	2–2	1–0	1–2	0–0	2–1	2–2		2–0
Socorrense	0–0	2–1	0–1	3–1	1–1	1–0	5–2	1–0	0–1	

Legend: Blue = home team win; Yellow = draw; Red = away team win.

== Final stage ==
Semifinals
1	Sergipe	2	1	3
4	Estanciano	1	0	0
2	River Plate	1	2	3
3	Confiança	2	1	3

Finals
1	Sergipe	0	3	3
2	River Plate'	0	2	2

=== Semifinals ===
==== First leg ====
May 12, 2013
16:00 UTC−03:00

Estanciano	1–2	Sergipe

Estádio Governador Augusto Franco, Estância

May 12, 2013
16:00 UTC−03:00

Confiança	2–1	River Plate

Batistão, Aracaju

==== Second leg ====
May 15, 2013
20:15 UTC−03:00

Sergipe	1–0	Estanciano

Batistão, Aracaju

May 15, 2013
20:15 UTC−03:00

River Plate	2–1	Confiança

Estádio Fernando França, Carmópolis
Referee: Paulo César de Oliveira

=== Finals ===
May 19, 2013
16:00 UTC−03:00

River Plate	0–0	Sergipe

Batistão, Aracaju
Referee: Ricardo Marques Ribeiro

May 26, 2013
16:00 UTC−03:00

Sergipe	3–2	River Plate
Lucão 1'; Fabinho Cambalhota 26'; Carlinhos 90+1'		Leandro Kivel 49', 77'

Batistão, Aracaju
Referee: André Luiz de Freitas

Sergipe is the champion of the 2013 Campeonato Sergipano.
