= Neto Oliveira =

Brazilian footballer

Personal information
- Full name: Lucicarlos Santos Oliveira
- Date of birth: 2 March 1998 (age 28)
- Place of birth: Neópolis, Brazil
- Height: 1.81 m (5 ft 11 in)
- Position: Forward

Team information
- Current team: São José-SP
- Number: 9

Youth career
- Estanciano

Senior career*
Years	Team	Apps	(Gls)
2018–2019	Olímpico	8	(1)
2018	→ Santa Cruz-SE (loan)		
2019	→ América de Pedrinhas (loan)		
2020	Freipaulistano	10	(2)
2021	Crato	10	(3)
2021	Tiradentes-CE	9	(4)
2021	Barra-SE	9	(7)
2022–	Falcon	37	(15)
2022	→ Lagarto (loan)	18	(1)
2023	→ Olímpico (loan)	13	(8)
2024	→ Manauara (loan)	23	(7)
2024	→ Desportiva Aracaju (loan)	8	(4)
2025	→ Confiança (loan)	25	(11)
2026	→ Rio Branco-ES (loan)	20	(1)
2026–	→ São José-SP (loan)	0	(0)
- * Club domestic league appearances and goals as of 18:12, 8 July 2026 (UTC)

Lucicarlos Santos Oliveira (born 2 March 1998), known as Neto Oliveira or just Neto, is a Brazilian footballer who plays as a forward for São José-SP, on loan from Falcon.

== Career ==
Born in Neópolis, Sergipe, Neto finished his formation with Estanciano, and made his senior debut with Olímpico in 2018. In the following three seasons, he played for Santa Cruz-SE, América de Pedrinhas and Freipaulistano, all in his native state.

Ahead of the 2021 season, Neto played in the Campeonato Cearense for Crato, after the club established a partnership with Tiradentes-CE, and later represented that club in the Campeonato Cearense Série B. He finished the year at Barra-SE, before moving to Falcon for the 2022 campaign.

On 14 April 2022, Neto and a further three Falcon players were loaned to Lagarto for the Série D. He renewed with his parent club in December, before further extending his link until 2027 on 15 February 2023, and returned to Olímpico in August, on loan.

In January 2024, Neto was announced in the squad of Manauara, before also playing for Desportiva Aracaju in the year. On 2 December 2024, still owned by Falcon, he was announced at Confiança.

Neto left Confiança on 9 October 2025, despite being the club's top scorer, and signed for Rio Branco-ES on 25 November. The following 7 July, he was announced at São José-SP for the Copa Paulista.

== Career statistics ==
As of 7 July 2026.

Club	Season	League			State league		Cup (Note: Includes Copa do Brasil)		Continental		Other		Total	
Club	Season	Division	Apps	Goals	Apps	Goals	Apps	Goals	Apps	Goals	Apps	Goals	Apps	Goals
Olímpico	2018	Sergipano	—		1	0	—		—		—		1	0
Olímpico	2019	Sergipano	—		7	1	—		—		—		7	1
Olímpico	Total		—		8	1	—		—		—		8	1
Freipaulistano	2020	Série D	—		10	2	1	0	—		4 (Note: Appearance(s) in Copa do Nordeste)	0	15	2
Crato	2021	Cearense	—		10	3	—		—		—		10	3
Tiradentes-CE	2021	Cearense Série B	—		9	4	—		—		—		9	4
Barra-SE	2021	Sergipano Série A2	—		9	7	—		—		—		9	7
Falcon	2022	Sergipano	—		11	2	—		—		—		11	2
Falcon	2023	Série D	16	7	10	6	1	0	—		—		27	13
Falcon	Total		16	7	21	8	1	0	—		—		38	15
Lagarto (loan)	2022	Série D	18	1	—		—		—		—		18	1
Olímpico (loan)	2023	Sergipano Série A2	—		13	8	—		—		—		13	8
Manauara (loan)	2024	Série D	12	4	11	3	1	0	—		1 (Note: Appearance(s) in Copa Verde)	0	25	7
Desportiva Aracaju (loan)	2024	Sergipano Série A2	—		8	4	—		—		—		8	4
Confiança (loan)	2025	Série C	15	3	10	8	2	1	—		11	4	38	16
Rio Branco-ES (loan)	2026	Série D	11	1	9	0	1	0	—		12 (Note: One appearance in Supercopa Capixaba, six appearances in Copa Centro-Oeste, five appearances and one goal in Copa Espírito Santo)	1	6	0
São José-SP (loan)	2026	Paulista A2	—		—		—		—		0	0	0	0
Career total			72	16	118	48	6	1	0	0	28	5	224	70

== Honours ==
América de Pedrinhas

- Campeonato Sergipano Série A2: 2019

Confiança

- Campeonato Sergipano: 2025
