= Antônio Dumas =

Brazilian footballer and manager (1955–2019)

Personal information
- Full name: Antônio Dumas Ramalho Esteves
- Date of birth: 28 November 1955
- Place of birth: Santo André, São Paulo, Brazil
- Date of death: 30 December 2019 (aged 64)
- Place of death: Conakry, Guinea

Senior career*
Years	Team	Apps	(Gls)
- Bahia
- Leônico
- Santos
- Olhanense
- GD Chaves

Managerial career
- 1987: Lagartense
- 1988: Estanciano
- 1989: Centro Sportivo Maruinense
- 1989–1990: Guarany-SE
- 1990: Itabaiana
- 1991–1992: Olímpico-SE
- 1993: Vasco-SE
- 1994: Frei Paulo
- 1995–1996: Itabi
- 1997–1998: Lagartense
- 1998–2000: Gabon
- 2000–2001: São Tomé and Príncipe
- 2002–2004: Togo
- 2004–2006: Equatorial Guinea
- 2007–2008: Atlético de Alagoinhas
- 2008–2009: Colo-Colo
- 2010: Gloriense
- 2010–2011: Estanciano
- 2011: Olímpico
- 2011: Socorrense
- 2012: Al-Mourada
- 2012: AS Gabès
- 2013–2014: Al Jazeera Zuwara
- 2014–2015: Hafia
- 2016: JS Kairouan
- * Club domestic league appearances and goals

Antônio Dumas Ramalho Esteves (28 November 1955 – 30 December 2019) was a Brazilian football player and manager.

== Playing career ==
Dumas played for Esporte Clube Bahia, Desportiva Leônico, Santos, S.C. Olhanense and G.D. Chaves.

== Coaching career ==
He coached a number of teams in Brazil, and Gabon, São Tomé and Príncipe, Togo and Equatorial Guinea in Africa.

He explained in a letter sent to a Brazilian media that he was not dismissed from the Togo national team. It was he who wanted to leave, having received the job offer from the Equatoguinean Football Federation to be the coach of its national team.

== Later life and death ==
Dumas died on 30 December 2019 in Conakry, Guinea, aged 64.
