= Isaías (footballer, born 1967) =

Brazilian footballer

Personal information
- Full name: Isaías Silva Aragão
- Date of birth: 2 July 1967
- Place of birth: Propriá, Brazil
- Date of death: 4 December 2007 (aged 40)
- Place of death: Capela, Brazil
- Height: 1.87 m (6 ft 2 in)
- Position: Centre-back

Youth career
- EC Propriá

Senior career*
Years	Team	Apps	(Gls)
1986–1988	Propriá		
1988	Lagartense		
1989–1992	Sergipe		
1992–1994	Penafiel		
1994–1996	Leça	30	(1)
1997–1999	Boavista	74	(4)
1999–2000	Cruzeiro	15	(1)
2000–2001	Leça		
2002	Tirsense		
2002	Chongqing Lifan		
- * Club domestic league appearances and goals as of 20 April 2024

Isaías Silva Aragão (2 July 1967 – 4 December 2007), simply known as Isaías, was a Brazilian professional footballer who played as a centre-back.

== Career ==
Born in Sergipe, Isaías began his career at his hometown club, EC Propriá. He also played for Lagartense and CS Sergipe before arriving in Portuguese football at FC Penafiel. He also played for Leça, where he won the second division, and later for Boavista, being champion of the Portuguese Cup in 1996–1997. In 1999 he arrived at Cruzeiro where he won the Recopa Sudamericana and the Copa Centro-Oeste. He ended his career in Chinese football.

== Honours ==
Sergipe

- Campeonato Sergipano: 1989, 1991, 1992

Leça

- Liga Portugal 2: 1994–95

Boavista

- Taça de Portugal: 1996–97
- Supertaça Cândido de Oliveira: 1997

Cruzeiro

- Recopa Sudamericana: 1998
- Copa Centro-Oeste: 1999

== Death ==
Isaías died after losing control of his car on BR-101, in the municipality of Capela, Alagoas, on 4 December 2007.
