= Hamílton (footballer, born 1980) =

Brazilian footballer

Personal information
- Full name: Hamílton Hênio Ferreira Calheiros
- Date of birth: 26 June 1980 (age 46)
- Place of birth: Murici, Alagoas, Brazil
- Height: 1.78 m (5 ft 10 in)
- Positions: Defensive midfielder; right midfielder

Youth career
- 2000: Estanciano
- 2001: Sergipe

Senior career*
Years	Team	Apps	(Gls)
2002–2005	Sergipe		
2005	Mogi Mirim		
2006	Sport Recife	34	(0)
2006–2008	Ankaraspor	23	(1)
2008–2010	Sociedade Boca Júnior	–	(–)
2008	→ Naútico (loan)	11	(0)
2009	→ Sport Recife (loan)	28	(0)
2010	→ Naútico (loan)	8	(0)
2011–2012	Sport Recife	31	(2)
2013	ABC	0	(0)
2013	Ceará	2	(0)
2015	Estanciano		
2016	Confiança	5	(0)
2017	Estanciano	0	(0)

International career
2003	Togo	1	(0)
- * Club domestic league appearances and goals

Hamílton Hênio Ferreira Calheiros (born 26 June 1980), known simply as Hamílton, is a retired professional footballer who played as a midfielder. Born in Brazil, he was a member, as a naturalized citizen, of the Togo national team.

== Early life ==
Hamílton was born in Murici, a municipality located in the western of the Brazilian state of Alagoas.

== International career ==
Hamílton was naturalized as Togolese in 2003 by request of fellow Brazilian Antônio Dumas, who was then the Togo national team head coach. After winning that year the Campeonato Sergipano with CS Sergipe, the Togolese Football Federation (FTF) president agreed Dumas' petition to call up him for the next Togo international matches.

Hamílton's only appearance for Togo was on 11 October 2003 in an away World Cup 2006 Qualifying match against Equatorial Guinea. That day Les Eperviers lost (0–1). He did not play in the second leg because he had left the Togolese passport in the Federation.

In early 2004, when Dumas resigned as head coach, Hamílton and most of the other Brazilian-born players who made up the Togolese squad in 2003 second half were dropped, excepting Alessandro Faria, who played some more matches in 2004.

On 10 July 2009, following some Hamílton's appearances at the 2009 Copa Libertadores with Sport Recife, appeared a news about the FTF resumed contact with him for can be called again, almost 6 years of his unique appearance.

Hamílton was called up for a friendly against Angola on 12 August 2009. However, he did not attended the call as he had a discipline problem occurred during a Campeonato Brasileiro Série A (Brasileirão) match between his club (Sport Recife) and Palmeiras a few days before.

Hamílton was going to be present for the 2010 FIFA World Cup qualification against Morocco on 6 September 2009. However, he had not liberated yet by Sport Recife because the Togolese federation did not send it a corresponding notification.

The Togo national team returned to call Hamílton for the 2010 FIFA World Cup qualification against Cameroon on 10 October 2009. A few days later, he asked FTF to not attend the match as he wanted to help Sport Recife at the Brasileirão, following poor performances (the Brazilian championship was not paused at FIFA dates).

In December 2009, Hamílton was included in the Togolese preliminary list for the 2010 African Cup of Nations but he refused to go, just because he wanted to spend the year-end holidays in the interior of Sergipe. Ultimately, he avoided be part of the Togo national football team attack.

== Career statistics ==
Appearances and goals by club, season and competition
Club	Season	League			Cup (Note: Includes Copa do Brasil.)		Continental (Note: Includes Copa Libertadores.)		State League (Note: Includes Campeonato Pernambucano.)		Total	
Club	Season	Division	Apps	Goals	Apps	Goals	Apps	Goals	Apps	Goals	Apps	Goals
Sport	2009	Série A	28	0	–		4	0	18	0	50	0
Naútico	2010	Série B	3	0	3	0	–		16	1	22	1

== Honours ==
Sergipe

- Campeonato Sergipano: 2003

Sport Recife

- Campeonato Pernambucano: 2006, 2009
