= Campeonato Sergipano Série A2 =

Football league in Sergipe, Brazil

- Organising body: FSF
- Founded: 1981; 45 years ago
- Country: Brazil
- State: Sergipe
- Level on pyramid: 2
- Promotion to: Campeonato Sergipano
- Current champions: Desportiva Aracaju (1st title) (2025)
- Most championships: Boca Júnior; Guarany; Maruinense (3 titles each)
- Website: FSF Official website

The Campeonato Sergipano Série A2 is the second tier of the professional state football league in the Brazilian state of Sergipe. It is run by the Sergipe Football Federation (FSF).

== List of champions ==
Season	Champions	Runners-up
1981	Lagarto EC (1)	
1982	Santa Cruz (1)	
1983	Propriá (1)	
1984	Maruinense (1)	
1985	Olímpico (1)	
1986	Lagarto EC (2)	
1987	Olímpico (2)	
1988	Santa Cruz (2)	
1989	Amadense (1)	
1990	Olímpico de Itabaianinha (1)	
1991	São Cristóvão (1)	
1992	Vasco (1)	
1993	Cotinguiba (1)	
1994	Olímpico de Itabaianinha (2)	
1995	Propriá (2)	
1996	Unknown	
1997	Estanciano (1)	Gararu
1998	Coritiba (1)	
1999	Gararu (1)	
2000	Itabaiana (1)	
2001	Guarany (1)	Olímpico de Itabaianinha
2002	Riachuelo (1)	Lagartense
2003	Maruinense (2)	Propriá
2004	Boca Júnior (1)	América de Propriá
2005	Pirambu (1)	Amadense
2006	América de Propriá (1)	São Cristóvão
2007	Boca Júnior (2)	São Domingos
2008	Sete de Junho (1)	Canindé
2009	River Plate (2)	Riachuelo
2010	Socorrense (1)	Estanciano
2011	Sete de Junho (2)	Lagarto FC
2012	América de Propriá (2)	Estanciano
2013	Coritiba (2)	Amadense
2014	Boca Júnior (3)	Boquinhense
2015	Dorense (1)	Guarany
2016	Freipaulistano (1)	Botafogo
2017	Socorrense (2)	Olímpico de Itabaianinha
2018	Guarany (2)	Estanciano
2019	América de Pedrinhas (1)	Maruinense
2020	Maruinense (3)	Gloriense
2021	Falcon (1)	América de Propriá
2022	Dorense (2)	Estanciano
2023	Carmópolis (1)	Olímpico de Itabaianinha
2024	Guarany (3)	Barra
2025	Desportiva Aracaju (1)	Gloriense

Names change

- SE São Cristóvão is the currently SE River Plate.

== Titles by clubs ==
Teams in bold still active.

Rank	Club	Winners	Winning years
1	**Boca Júnior**	3	2004, 2007, 2014
1	**Guarany**	3	2001, 2018, 2024
1	**Maruinense**	3	1984, 2003, 2020
4	**América de Propriá**	2	2006, 2012
4	**Coritiba**	2	1998, 2013
4	**Dorense**	2	2015, 2022
4	Lagarto EC	2	1981, 1986
4	Olímpico	2	1985, 1987
4	**Olímpico de Itabaianinha**	2	1990, 1994
4	**Propriá**	2	1983, 1995
4	River Plate	2	1991, 2009
4	Santa Cruz	2	1982, 1988
4	**Sete de Junho**	2	2008, 2011
4	**Socorrense**	2	2010, 2017
14	**Amadense**	1	1986
14	**América de Pedrinhas**	1	2019
14	**Carmópolis**	1	2023
14	Cotinguiba	1	1993
14	**Desportiva Aracaju**	1	2025
14	**Estanciano**	1	1997
14	**Falcon**	1	2021
14	**Freipaulistano**	1	2016
14	Gararu	1	1999
14	**Itabaiana**	1	2000
14	Pirambu	1	2005
14	**Riachuelo**	1	2002
14	Vasco	1	1992

=== By city ===
City	Championships	Clubs
Aracaju	5	Olímpico (2), Cotinguiba (1), Desportiva Aracaju (1), Vasco (1)
Propriá	4	América (2), Propriá (2)
Carmópolis	3	River Plate (2), Carmópolis (1)
Cristinápolis	3	Boca Júnior (3)
Estância	3	Santa Cruz (2), Estanciano (1)
Itabaiana	3	Coritiba (2), Itabaiana (1)
Maruim	3	Maruinense (3)
Porto da Folha	3	Guarany (3)
Tobias Barreto	3	Sete de Junho (2), Amadense (1)
Itabaianinha	2	Olímpico (2)
Lagarto	2	Lagarto EC (2)
Nossa Senhora das Dores	2	Dorense (2)
Nossa Senhora do Socorro	2	Socorrense (2)
Barra dos Coqueiros	1	Falcon (1)
Frei Paulo	1	Frei Paulistano (1)
Gararu	1	Gararu (1)
Pedrinhas	1	América (1)
Pirambu	1	Pirambu (1)
Riachuelo	1	Riachuelo (1)

== See also ==
- Campeonato Sergipano
