= Eriverton =

Brazilian footballer (born 1978)

Personal information
- Full name: Eriverton Santos Lima
- Date of birth: 1 January 1978 (age 48)
- Place of birth: Porto da Folha, Brazil
- Height: 1.70 m (5 ft 7 in)
- Position: Midfielder

Senior career*
Years	Team	Apps	(Gls)
2000	Confiança		
2001–2004	Porto Caruaru		
2002–2004	→ Santa Cruz (loan)		
2005–2006	Moreirense	40	(6)
2006–2007	Portimonense	25	(1)
2007–2009	Vihren	49	(8)
2009–2011	Moreirense	18	(1)
2011	Socorrense		
2012	River Plate-SE		
2012	Cotinguiba		
2013	Lagarto		
- * Club domestic league appearances and goals

Eriverton Santos Lima (born 1 January 1978), or simply Eriverton, is a Brazilian former footballer who played as a midfielder. Eriverton is a typical playmaker with very precise pass and good techniques.

== Career ==
In 2005, he went to Portugal and signed with Moreirense F.C. For two years played in 40 caps and scored 6 goals. In June 2006 Lima signed with other Portuguese club Portimonense S.C. There he played in 25 caps and scored 1 goal. In next year he went to Bulgaria and signed with FC Vihren Sandanski for a free transfer. In December 2008 Eriverton scored three goals for Vihren in a match against Spartak Plovdiv for a Bulgarian Cup. A few days later the fans of Vihren chose Eriverton for "The best player of Vihren for 2008".
