= Copa Governo do Estado de Sergipe =

- Organiser(s): Federação Sergipana de Futebol
- Founded: 2003
- Region: Sergipe, Brazil
- Qualifier for: Copa do Brasil
- Related competitions: Campeonato Sergipano
- Most championships: Confiança (4 titles)

The Copa Governo do Estado de Sergipe (English: Sergipe Governors Cup) is a tournament organized by Federação Sergipana de Futebol in order to decide which club would represent the state at the Copa do Brasil. The competition was resumed once again in 2025.

== List of champions ==
Season	Champions	Runners-up
2003	Confiança (1)	Sergipe
2004	Not held	
2005	Confiança (2)	Sergipe
2006	Itabaiana (1)	Guarany
2007	Itabaiana (2)	Olímpico de Itabaianinha
2008	Confiança (3)	Itabaiana
2009	São Domingos (1)	Sergipe
2010	São Domingos (2)	América de Propriá
2011	Not held	
2012	Confiança (4)	Sergipe
2013	Sergipe (1)	River Plate
2014	Amadense (1)	Itabaiana
2015–2024	Not held	
2025	Itabaiana (3)	Sergipe
