= Thiago Santos (footballer, born 1990) =

Brazilian footballer

Personal information
- Full name: Thiago dos Santos
- Date of birth: 2 August 1990 (age 36)
- Place of birth: Aracaju, Brazil
- Height: 1.84 m (6 ft 1/2 in)
- Position: Forward

Team information
- Current team: Barra

Senior career*
Years	Team	Apps	(Gls)
2010–2011	Sergipe		
2010	→ América–SE (loan)		
2010	→ Socorrense (loan)		
2011	→ Lagarto (loan)		
2012–2013	Internacional	2	(0)
2013	→ Canoas (loan)	9	(3)
2014	Confiança	19	(3)
2015	Rio Branco	15	(5)
2015–2016	Bragantino	33	(15)
2016	Sampaio Corrêa	13	(5)
2017	Linense	11	(1)
2018	Paraná	14	(3)
2018–2019	Atlético Goianiense	16	(3)
2019	Ferroviária	5	(1)
2020	Sampaio Corrêa	2	(0)
2021	Joinville	12	(4)
2021	Paysandu	10	(1)
2022	Brasil de Pelotas	19	(7)
2023	São José	31	(9)
2023–	Barra	0	(0)
- * Club domestic league appearances and goals as of 8 October 2023

Thiago dos Santos (born 2 October 1990), known as Thiago Santos, is a Brazilian footballer who plays as a forward for Barra.

== Career statistics ==
As of 6 February 2017

Club	Season	League			State League		Cup		Continental		Other		Total	
Club	Season	Division	Apps	Goals	Apps	Goals	Apps	Goals	Apps	Goals	Apps	Goals	Apps	Goals
Internacional	2012	Série A	—		2	0	—		—		—		2	0
Canoas	2013	Gaúcho	—		9	3	—		—		—		9	3
Confiança	2014	Série D	7	0	12	3	—		—		—		19	3
Rio Branco	2015	Paulista A2	—		15	5	—		—		—		15	5
Bragantino	2015	Série B	12	3	—		—		—		—		12	3
Bragantino	2016	Série B	4	0	16	12	1	0	—		—		21	12
Bragantino	Subtotal		16	3	16	12	1	0	—		—		33	15
Sampaio Corrêa	2016	Série B	13	5	—		—		—		—		13	5
Linense	2017	Paulista	—		1	1	—		—		—		1	1
Career total			36	8	65	24	1	0	0	0	0	0	92	32
