= Campeonato Sergipano Série A3 =

Football league in Brazil

- Organising body: FSF
- Founded: 2025; 1 year ago
- Country: Brazil
- State: Sergipe
- Level on pyramid: 3
- Promotion to: Série A2
- Current champions: Estanciano (1st title) (2025)
- Most championships: Estanciano (1 title)
- Website: FSF Official website

The Campeonato Sergipano Série A3 is the third tier of the professional state football league in the Brazilian state of Sergipe. It is run by the Sergipe Football Federation (FSF).

== List of champions ==
| Season | Champions | Runners-up |
|---|---|---|
| 2025 | Estanciano (1) | Socorrense |

== Titles by team ==
Teams in bold stills active.

| Rank | Club | Winners | Winning years |
|---|---|---|---|
| 1 | **Estanciano** | 1 | 2025 |

=== By city ===
| City | Championships | Clubs |
|---|---|---|
| Estância | 1 | Estanciano (1) |
