= Campeonato Sergipano de Futebol Feminino =

Women's football league in Sergipe, Brazil

- Founded: 2004
- Country: Brazil
- Confederation: FSF
- Promotion to: Brasileiro Série A3
- Current champions: Juventude de Estância (2nd title) (2025)
- Most championships: Santos Dumont; Boca Júnior (3 titles)

The Campeonato Sergipano de Futebol Feminino is the women's football state championship of Sergipe state, and is contested since 2004.

== List of champions ==
Following is the list with all recognized titles of Campeonato Sergipano Feminino:

Season	Champions	Runners-up
2004	Santos Dumont(1)	São Paulo Sol Nascente
2005	Santos Dumont (2)	Juventude de Aracaju
2006–2008	Not held	
2009	Atlético Gloriense (1)	Boca Júnior
2010	Boca Júnior (1)	Lagarto
2011	Not held	
2012	Boca Júnior (2)	Força Jovem
2013–2015	Not held	
2016	Boca Júnior (3)	Canindé
2017	Canindé (1)	Boca Júnior
2018	Canindé (2)	Real Sergipe
2019	Santos Dumont (3)	Estanciano
2020	Not held due to COVID-19 pandemic in Brazil	
2021	Estanciano (1)	Rosário Central
2022	Estanciano (2)	Lagarto
2023	Confiança (1)	Lagarto
2024	Juventude de Estância (1)	Confiança
2025	Juventude de Estância (2)	Confiança

Cities change

- Boca Júnior has moved from Cristinápolis to Estância.

== Titles by team ==
Teams in bold stills active.

Rank	Club	Winners	Winning years
1	**Santos Dumont**	3	2004, 2005, 2019
1	Boca Júnior	3	2010, 2012, 2016
3	**Canindé**	2	2017, 2018
3	**Estanciano**	2	2021, 2022
3	**Juventude de Estância**	2	2024, 2025
6	Atlético Gloriense	1	2016
6	**Confiança**	1	2023

=== By city ===
City	Championships	Clubs
Estância	5	Estanciano (2), Juventude (2), Boca Júnior (1)
Aracaju	4	Santos Dumont (3), Confiança (1)
Cristinápolis	3	Boca Júnior (2)
Canindé de São Francisco	2	Canindé (2)
Nossa Senhora da Glória	1	Atlético Gloriense (1)
