= Sete de Junho Esporte Clube =

Sete de Junho
- Full name: Sete de Junho Esporte Clube
- Nickname(s): Galo do Rio Real
- Founded: 23 June 1983; 41 years ago
- Ground: Brejeirão, Tobias Barreto, Sergipe state, Brazil
- Capacity: 4,000
Home colors	Away colors

Sete de Junho Esporte Clube, commonly known as Sete de Junho, is a Brazilian football club based in Tobias Barreto, Sergipe state.

== History ==
The club was founded on June 23, 1981. They won the Campeonato Sergipano Série A2 in 2011, after beating Laranjeiras in the last round of the competition, thus finishing ahead of Lagarto in the league, thus gaining promotion to the 2012 First Level.

== Achievements ==
- Campeonato Sergipano Série A2:
  - Winners (2): 2008, 2011

== Stadium ==
Sete de Junho Esporte Clube play their home games at Estádio Antônio Brejeiro, nicknamed Brejeirão. The stadium has a maximum capacity of 4,000 people.
