= Luciano Quadros =

Brazilian football manager and former player

Personal information
- Full name: Luciano Quadros da Silva
- Date of birth: 10 April 1974 (age 52)
- Place of birth: Porto Alegre, Brazil
- Height: 1.88 m (6 ft 2 in)
- Position: Goalkeeper

Senior career*
Years	Team	Apps	(Gls)
1994–1996	Internacional		
1997	Paysandu		
1998	Tuna Luso		
1999	Remo		
2000–2003	São Caetano	3	(0)
2004	União São João		
2007	XV de Piracicaba		
2007–2008	Eastern	12	(0)
2008–2009	Fourway	11	(0)
2009	Kitchee	11	(0)
2009–2010	Catanduvense		
2010	Passo Fundo		
2011	Ferroviária		
2011–2012	Portuguesa Santista		

Managerial career
- 2014–2015: Linense
- 2015: São José dos Campos
- 2016: Olímpia
- 2016: Audax Rio
- 2017: Marília
- 2017: Audax Rio
- 2018: Audax
- 2018: Sampaio Corrêa-RJ
- 2019: Cabofriense
- 2019: Taboão da Serra
- 2019: Bonsucesso
- 2020: Potiguar Mossoró
- 2020: Cabofriense
- 2020: Sampaio Corrêa-RJ
- 2021: Potiguar Mossoró
- 2021: Gonçalense
- 2021–2022: Falcon
- 2022: Gonçalense
- 2023: Falcon
- 2023: Goytacaz
- 2024: Audax Rio
- 2024: Aymorés
- 2024: Social
- 2024: Bonsucesso
- 2025: Aymorés
- 2025: Cabofriense
- 2025: Confiança U23
- 2025: Desportiva Aracaju
- 2026: Sampaio Corrêa
- * Club domestic league appearances and goals

Luciano Quadros da Silva (Chinese: 盧斯安奴 Luciano Quadros, born 10 April 1974 in Porto Alegre, Rio Grande do Sul), known as Luciano Quadros, is a Brazilian football coach and former player who played as a goalkeeper.

== Career statistics ==
Club performance			League		Cup		League Cup		Continental		Total	
Season	Club	League	Apps	Goals	Apps	Goals	Apps	Goals	Apps	Goals	Apps	Goals
Hong Kong			League		FA Cup & Shield		League Cup		Asia		Total	
2007–08	Eastern	First Division	12	0	6	0	5	0	-		23	0
2008–09	Fourway	First Division	11	0	3	0	-		-		14	0
2008–09	Kitchee	First Division	11	0	0	0	0	0	-		11	0
Total	Hong Kong		34	0	9	0	5	0	-		48	0

== Honours ==
=== Player ===
São Caetano

- Campeonato Paulista Série A2: 2000

Individual

- Hong Kong Top Footballer: 2007–08

=== Coach ===
Bonsucesso

- Copa Rio: 2019

Falcon

- Campeonato Sergipano Série A2: 2021

Desportiva Aracaju

- Campeonato Sergipano Série A2: 2025

Preceded by Cristiano Preigchadt Cordeiro	Hong Kong Senior Shield Best Defender Award; 2007-08	Succeeded by Last Holder
