= Lucas Rian =

Brazilian footballer (born 2000)

Personal information
- Full name: Lucas Rian Santos Oliveira
- Date of birth: 3 June 2000 (age 26)
- Place of birth: Ilha das Flores, Brazil
- Height: 1.80 m (5 ft 11 in)
- Position: Forward

Team information
- Current team: São Bernardo
- Number: 7

Senior career*
Years	Team	Apps	(Gls)
2021–2022	Atlético Gloriense	17	(6)
2022	Falcon	0	(0)
2022	→ Lagarto (loan)	16	(9)
2023–2024	Matsumoto Yamaga	2	(0)
2024	→ Confiança (loan)	19	(5)
2024	→ Ceará (loan)	20	(1)
2025	Ceará	0	(0)
2025	→ São Bernardo (loan)	11	(1)
2026–	São Bernardo	17	(2)
- * Club domestic league appearances and goals as of 18 November 2026

Lucas Rian Santos Oliveira (born 3 June 2000), known as Lucas Rian, is a Brazilian footballer who plays as a forward for São Bernardo.

== Career ==
Born in Ilha das Flores, Sergipe, Lucas Rian began his career with Atlético Gloriense in 2021. In 2022, he signed a contract with Falcon, but was immediately loaned out to Série D side Lagarto.

On 9 January 2023, after scoring nine goals for Lagarto, Lucas Rian moved abroad and joined J3 League side Matsumoto Yamaga; Falcon retained 30% of the player's economic rights. On 29 January of the following year, after being rarely used, he returned to his home country after joining Confiança on loan.

On 16 July 2024, Lucas Rian moved to Ceará also on loan. The following 16 January, after helping the club to achieve promotion to the Série A, he signed a permanent two-year deal with Vozão after the club paid a US$ 200,000 fee for the transfer, but was immediately loaned out to São Bernardo.

== Career statistics ==
As of 3 February 2025

Club	Season	League			State League		Cup		Continental		Other		Total	
Club	Season	Division	Apps	Goals	Apps	Goals	Apps	Goals	Apps	Goals	Apps	Goals	Apps	Goals
Atlético Gloriense	2021	Sergipano	—		9	3	—		—		—		9	3
Atlético Gloriense	2022	Sergipano	—		8	3	—		—		—		8	3
Atlético Gloriense	Total		—		17	6	—		—		—		17	6
Lagarto	2022	Série D	16	9	—		—		—		—		16	9
Matsumoto Yamaga	2023	J3 League	2	0	—		—		—		—		2	0
Confiança (loan)	2024	Série C	11	3	8	2	1	1	—		—		20	6
Ceará	2024	Série B	20	1	—		—		—		—		20	1
São Bernardo (loan)	2025	Série C	0	0	5	1	—		—		—		5	1
Career total			49	13	30	9	1	1	0	0	0	0	80	23

== Honours ==
Confiança

- Campeonato Sergipano: 2024

Ceará

- Acesso a série A : 2024
