= Wendel Matheus =

Brazilian footballer

Personal information
- Full name: Wendel Matheus de Lima Figueroa
- Date of birth: 12 October 1999 (age 27)
- Place of birth: Recife, Brazil
- Height: 1.89 m (6 ft 2 in)
- Position: Defender

Team information
- Current team: Nakhon Ratchasima
- Number: 35

Youth career
- 2016: APAFUT
- 2017–2019: Náutico

Senior career*
Years	Team	Apps	(Gls)
2019	Náutico	0	(0)
2019	→ América-PE (loan)	3	(0)
2020	Serranense	0	(0)
2020–2021	Vera Cruz	19	(0)
2021–2022	Falcon	10	(0)
2022	Passo Fundo	15	(0)
2022	Centro Oeste	8	(0)
2023	Londrina	4	(0)
2023	Portuguesa	0	(0)
2024	Fujieda MYFC	16	(0)
2025	ABC	5	(1)
2025–	Nakhon Ratchasima	0	(0)
- * Club domestic league appearances and goals as of 13 July 2025

Wendel Matheus de Lima Figueroa (born 12 October 1999), known as Wendel Matheus or just Wendel, is a Brazilian footballer who plays as either a central defender or a left back for Nakhon Ratchasima.

== Club career ==
Born in Recife, Pernambuco, Wendel was a Náutico youth graduate. In April 2019, he and another 12 teammates were loaned to América-PE for the 2019 Série D.

After featuring rarely, Wendel signed for Serranense for the 2020 season, but was only an unused substitute before returning to his native state and joining Vera Cruz. He won the 2020 Campeonato Pernambucano Série A2 with the side, and avoided relegation in the 2021 Campeonato Pernambucano.

Wendel subsequently moved to Falcon and won the 2021 Campeonato Sergipano Série A2 with the club. He was confirmed at the side for the 2022 season, but featured in only one match before signing for Passo Fundo in April of that year.

In September 2022, Wendel was included in Centro Oeste's squad for the upcoming Campeonato Goiano Terceira Divisão. On 27 December, he was announced at Série B side Londrina.

On 2 May 2023, Portuguesa announced the signing of Wendel until the end of the season.

Ahead of the 2024 season, Wendel joined J2 League club Fujieda MYFC.

== Career statistics ==
As of 1 November 2023

Club	Season	League			State League		Cup		Continental		Other		Total	
Club	Season	Division	Apps	Goals	Apps	Goals	Apps	Goals	Apps	Goals	Apps	Goals	Apps	Goals
América-PE	2019	Série D	3	0	—		—		—		—		3	0
Serranense	2020	Mineiro Módulo II	—		0	0	—		—		—		0	0
Vera Cruz	2020	Pernambucano Série A2	—		10	0	—		—		—		10	0
Vera Cruz	2021	Pernambucano	—		9	0	—		—		—		9	0
Vera Cruz	Total		—		19	0	—		—		—		19	0
Falcon	2021	Sergipano Série A2	—		9	0	—		—		—		9	0
Falcon	2022	Sergipano	—		1	0	—		—		—		1	0
Falcon	Total		—		10	0	—		—		—		10	0
Passo Fundo	2022	Gaúcho Série A2	—		15	0	—		—		—		15	0
Centro Oeste	2022	Goiano 3ª Divisão	—		8	0	—		—		—		8	0
Londrina	2023	Série B	0	0	4	0	0	0	—		—		4	0
Portuguesa	2023	Paulista	—		0	0	—		—		8 (Note: Appearance(s) in Copa Paulista)	0	8	0
Career total			3	0	56	0	0	0	0	0	8	0	67	0

== Honours ==
Vera Cruz

- Campeonato Pernambucano Série A2: 2020

Falcon

- Campeonato Sergipano Série A2: 2021
