= Copa Alagipe =

- Organiser(s): FAF, FSF
- Founded: 2005
- Region: Alagoas, Sergipe
- Teams: 8
- Related competitions: Campeonato Alagoano, Campeonato Sergipano
- Most championships: ASA (1 title)

The Copa Alagipe (English: Alagipe Cup) is a football regional tournament organized by the Brazilian states of Alagoas and Sergipe. It had the first edition in 2005, a second edition is being speculated for August 2022.

== History ==
The 2005 edition was used as a qualification for 2006 Campeonato Brasileiro Série C. The return of the tournament in 2022 aims to replace the function of the state cups, moving the team from the states that are culturally close and find it difficult to compete in the main regional competition, the Copa do Nordeste.

== List of champions ==
Season	Champions	Runners-up
2005	(Alagoas) ASA (1)	(Sergipe) Lagartense
