= Amadense Esporte Clube =

Amadense
- Full name: Amadense Esporte Clube
- Nickname: Leão do Rio Real
- Founded: August 23, 1981 (44 years ago)
- Ground: Brejeirão, Tobias Barreto, Sergipe state, Brazil
- Capacity: 4,000
Home colors	Away colors

Amadense Esporte Clube, commonly known as Amadense, is a Brazilian football club based in Tobias Barreto, Sergipe state.

== History ==
The club was founded on August 23, 1981, in Nossa Senhora da Glória, moving to Tobias Barreto city in 2005. They finished in the second position in the Campeonato Sergipano Série A2 in 2005, when they lost the competition to Olímpico de Pirambu.

== Honours ==
- Copa Governo do Estado de Sergipe: 1

2014

== Stadium ==
Amadense Esporte Clube play their home games at Estádio Antônio Brejeiro, nicknamed Brejeirão. The stadium has a maximum capacity of 4,000 people.
