= Sport Club Gararu =

Gararu
- Full name: Sport Club Gararu
- Founded: January 1, 1989 (36 years ago)
- Ground: Estádio João Alves Filho, Gararu, Sergipe state, Brazil
- Capacity: 2,000
Home colors	Away colors

Sport Club Gararu, commonly known as Gararu, is a Brazilian football club based in Gararu, Sergipe state.

== History ==
The club was founded on January 1, 1989. Gararu won the Campeonato Sergipano Série A2 in 1997.

== Achievements ==
- Campeonato Sergipano Série A2:
  - Winners (1): 1997

== Stadium ==
Sport Club Gararu play their home games at Estádio João Alves Filho. The stadium has a maximum capacity of 2,000 people.
