= Lucas Barbosa =

Lucas Barbosa may refer to:

- Lucas Barbosa (footballer, born 1996), Brazilian footballer
- Lucas Barbosa (footballer, born 2001), Brazilian footballer
- Lucas Barbosa (gymnast) (born 1994), Brazilian aerobic gymnast
- Lucas Barbosa (martial artist) (born 1992), Brazilian martial artist
