= Giovanni Scanu =

Italian football manager

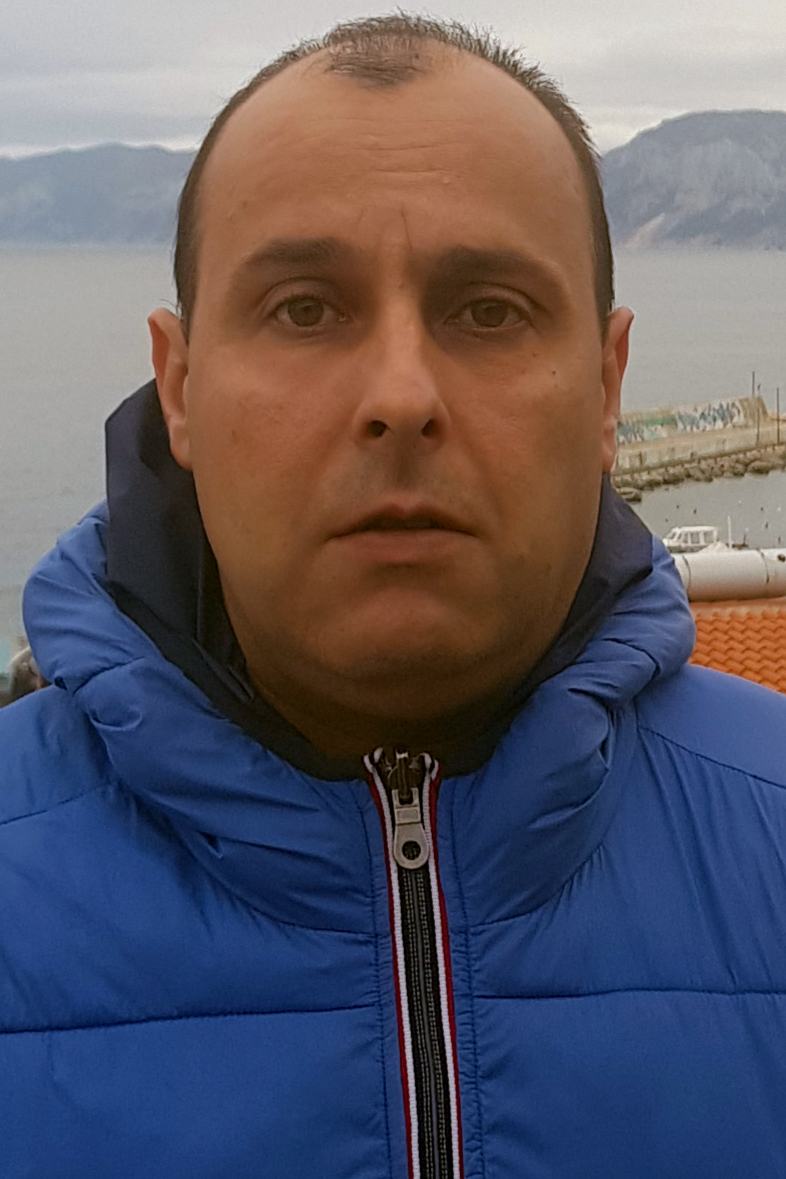
- Scanu in 2020

Personal information
- Date of birth: 3 May 1975 (age 51)
- Place of birth: Nuoro, Italy

Team information
- Current team: Tshinkunku

Managerial career
- Years: Team
- 2006–2007: Tempio (assistant)
- 2007–2008: Como (assistant)
- 2008–2010: Alghero (assistant)
- 2010–2011: Tavolara (assistant)
- 2011: Nuorese
- 2012: FK Tauras Tauragė
- 2013–2014: Kaduna United
- 2014–2015: FK Tauras Tauragė
- 2015: Coritiba de Sergipe
- 2016–2017: FC Tatabánya
- 2017: Brothers Union
- 2018–2019: FK Nevėžis
- 2020: FC Zimbru Chișinău
- 2021–2022: Kilimani City FC
- 2024: Thrissur Magic
- 2025–: Tshinkunku

Giovanni Scanu (born 3 May 1975) is an Italian football manager who serves as the head coach of Congolese club Tshinkunku in the Linafoot.

Born in Nuoro, Italy, Scanu was assistant manager of various clubs in the Serie D and Lega Pro Seconda Divisione from 2006 to 2011, when he started his head coaching career at hometown club Nuorese Calcio in the Eccellenza. From 2012 onwards, Scanu coached in various countries abroad, namely FK Tauras Tauragė and FK Nevezis in Lithuania, Kaduna United in Nigeria, Coritiba de Sergipe in Brazil, FC Tatabánya in Hungary, Brothers Union in Bangladesh, FC Zimbru Chisinau in Moldova, Kilimani City in Tanzania, Thrissur Magic in India, and Tshinkunku in the DR Congo.

== Managerial career ==
Scanu was born in Nuoro, Italy. His coaching career began in the Santu Pedru football school, where he stayed for three years. Afterwards, he moved to lead Atletico Nuoro for two years. In 2003 he moved to Loculese, followed by Tuttavista and then a return to Atletico Nuoro.

He became the assistant manager under Ninni Corda at Tempio in the Serie D, where he won the 2006–07 Serie D – Girone B title. The next year, he and Corda moved to Como, where they again won the Serie D – Girone B, as well as the Coppa Italia Serie D. He then moved on to Alghero in the Lega Pro Seconda Divisione in 2008–09 as an assistant, remaining for two years. He then moved to Tavolara in Serie D, again as an assistant.

In 2011, he started as head coach, in his hometown with Eccellenza club Nuorese Calcio, but did not remain there for long before resigning the position in December 2011. In 2012, he moved to Lithuanian club FK Tauras Tauragė in the top tier A Lyga, bringing several Italian players with him. Then, in 2013, he moved to Kaduna United in the Nigerian Premier League. The following year, in 2014, he returned to Lithuania, again at FK Tauras in the second tier I Lyga, following their relegation the prior season. In 2015, he moved to Brazil, becoming the coach of Coritiba de Sergipe. He moved to Hungarian side FC Tatabánya of the third tier Nemzeti Bajnokság III for the 2016–17 season, until the team was disqualified. In July 2017, he moved to Bangladesh (Asia now being his fourth different continent), in the Bangladesh Premier League with Brothers Union. A month later, Brothers replaced him after the fourth match of the season, after Scanu went on a lengthy leave of absence, due to health concerns of his mother. In 2018–19, he returned to Lithuania with FK Nevezis in the I Lyga. In 2020, he moved to Moldova with FC Zimbru Chisinau in the top tier Divizia Națională. He remained coach until the COVID-19 pandemic interrupted the season and then he and the club parted ways.

In 2021, he became the manager of Kilimani City FC in the second-tier Tanzanian First Division League initially signing a short three-month contract until the end of the season, but remained with the club beyond that as head coach. While there, he turned down the opportunity to become the Zanzibar national team coach, preferring to remain a coach at club level.

In August 2024, he was named the head coach of Indian club Thrissur Magic FC in the Super League Kerala. In late 2025, he was named head coach of Congolese club US Tshinkunku in the first tier Linafoot.

== Honours ==
as Assistant manager

Tempio

- Serie D Girone B: 2006–07

Como

- Serie D Girone B: 2007–08
- Coppa Italia Serie D: 2007–08
