= Lucas Barbosa (footballer, born 1996) =

Brazilian footballer

Personal information
- Full name: José Lucas Santos Barbosa de Lima
- Date of birth: 1 April 1996 (age 30)
- Place of birth: Brazil
- Height: 1.78 m (5 ft 10 in)
- Position: Forward

Team information
- Current team: VfB Bezau
- Number: 10

Senior career*
Years	Team	Apps	(Gls)
2013	Unitri		
2017–2019	Austria Lustenau	53	(17)
2019–2020	Grazer AK	12	(2)
2020–2021	Maruinense	11	(2)
2021–	VfB Bezau	52	(35)
- * Club domestic league appearances and goals as of 29 April 2023

José Lucas Santos Barbosa de Lima, known as Lucas Barbosa (born 1 April 1996) is a Brazilian footballer who plays as a forward for Austrian club VfB Bezau.

== Club career ==
He made his Austrian Football First League debut for SC Austria Lustenau on 17 March 2017 in a game against FC Liefering.

Ahead of the 2019/20 season, Barbosa joined Grazer AK on a 1-year contract with an option to a further year.

== Honours ==
Maruinense

- Campeonato Sergipano Série A2: 2020
