= Itabaiana (disambiguation) =

Itabaiana may refer to:

- Itabaiana, a municipality located in the Brazilian state of Sergipe

- Associação Olímpica de Itabaiana, a football club based there
- Itabaiana Coritiba Foot Ball Clube, a football club based there

- Itabaiana, Paraiba, a municipality located in the Brazilian state of Paraiba
