= Rivan (footballer) =

Brazilian footballer

Personal information
- Full name: Rivanílton de França
- Date of birth: 12 May 1981
- Place of birth: Sergipe, Brazil
- Height: 1.80 m (5 ft 11 in)
- Position: Midfielder

Youth career
- Cruzeiro

Senior career*
Years	Team	Apps	(Gls)
- Vitória de Santo Antão
2001	Cruzeiro		
2001–2003	Rad	3	(0)
2002–2003	→ Hajduk Beograd (loan)		
2005	Vitória (PE)		
2005–2006	Gil Vicente	1	(0)
2007–2008	Boca Júnior		
2008	Itaúna		
2009	Boca Júnior		
2010–2011	São Domingos		
2011	América (SE)		
- * Club domestic league appearances and goals

Rivanílton de França (born 12 May 1981), also known as Rivan, is a Brazilian former professional footballer who played as a midfielder.

== Career ==
Rivan was born in Sergipe. After playing with Vitória de Santo Antão and Cruzeiro, in 2001, he moved to Serbia and signed with top league club FK Rad. He made three appearances in the 2001–02 First League of FR Yugoslavia. He signed a contract but, after not getting many chances, he was loaned to FK Hajduk Beograd. After a couple of years, he returned to Brazil to play in the giant Vitória. His second European adventure was in Portugal where he played one season in Gil Vicente F.C. in the Portuguese Liga.

Afterwards he represented Boca Júnior, Itaúna, São Domingos and América (SE).
