= Olímpico Pirambu Futebol Clube =

Olímpico de Pirambu
- Full name: Olímpico Pirambu Futebol Clube
- Nickname(s): Leão da Caserna; Time da Calcinha Preta
- Founded: 4 September 1931; 93 years ago
- Ground: Estádio André Moura, Pirambu, Sergipe state, Brazil
- Capacity: 3,000
Home colours	Away colours

Olímpico Pirambu Futebol Clube, commonly known as Olímpico de Pirambu, is a Brazilian football club based in Pirambu, Sergipe state. They competed in the Série C and in the Copa do Brasil once.

== History ==
The club was founded on September 4, 1931, in Aracaju, as Siqueira Campos Futebol Clube.The team then changed its name to Olímpico Futebol Clube in 1939.In 1996, the team moved to Itabi due to financial problems, only to move to Carmópolis in the following year and to Lagarto in the same year. The team eventually moved to Pirambu in 2005, changing its name to Olímpico Pirambu Futebol Clube. Olímpico de Pirambu won the Campeonato Sergipano Série A2 in 2005, and the Campeonato Sergipano in 2006. They competed in the Série C in 2006, when they were eliminated in the First Stage, and in the Copa do Brasil in 2007, when they were eliminated in the First Round by Corinthians.

== Honours ==
- Campeonato Sergipano
  - Winners (3): 1946, 1947, 2006
- Campeonato Sergipano Série A2
  - Winners (3): 1985, 1987, 2005
- Torneio Início do Sergipe
  - Winners (2): 1944, 1950

== Stadium ==
Olímpico Pirambu Futebol Clube play their home games at Estádio André Moura. The stadium has a maximum capacity of 3,000 people. The club also played at Estádio Valberto Gomes de Conceição, nicknamed Bebetão. This stadium has a maximum capacity of 4,000 people.
