= Associação Desportiva Aracaju =

Desportiva Aracaju
- Full name: Associação Desportiva Aracaju
- Nickname: Arara Atômica
- Founded: 5 December 2023; 2 years ago
- Ground: Estádio Adolfo Rollemberg
- Capacity: 2,000
- President: Danillo Farias
- Head coach: Steve Almeida
- League: Campeonato Sergipano
- 2025: Sergipano Série A2, 1st of 10 (champions)
- Website: desportivaaracaju.com.br
Home colours	Away colours

Associação Desportiva Aracaju, known as Desportiva Aracaju, is a Brazilian football team based in Aracaju, Sergipe. Founded in 2023, they won the Campeonato Sergipano Série A2 and the Copa Governo do Estado de Sergipe once.

== History ==
Founded on 5 December 2023, Desportiva Aracaju began playing in the following year's Campeonato Sergipano Série A2. In November 2025, the club achieved promotion to the Campeonato Sergipano Série A1 by winning the second division.

After a poor campaign in the 2026 Sergipano which led to relegation, Desportiva won the year's Copa Governo do Estado de Sergipe, also earning a place in the 2027 Campeonato Brasileiro Série D.

== Honours ==
- Copa Governo do Estado de Sergipe
  - Winners (1): 2026
- Campeonato Sergipano Série A2
  - Winners (1): 2025
