= Felipe Mamão =

Brazilian footballer

Personal information
- Full name: Felipe Soares Pullhuber
- Date of birth: 8 November 1985 (age 41)
- Place of birth: Belém, Brazil
- Height: 1.82 m (6 ft 0 in)
- Position: Forward

Senior career*
| Years | Team | Apps | (Gls) |
| 2005–2008 | Remo | | |
| 2006 | → Tuna Luso (loan) | | |
| 2007 | → Tuna Luso (loan) | | |
| 2008 | Atlético Sorocaba | | |
| 2008 | Águia de Marabá | | |
| 2009 | Nacional-AM | | |
| 2009 | Águia de Marabá | | |
| 2010 | Luverdense | | |
| 2010 | Águia de Marabá | | |
| 2010–2011 | Tuna Luso | | |
| 2011–2012 | River Plate-SE | | |
- * Club domestic league appearances and goals as of 19 March 2024

Felipe Soares Pullhuber (born 8 November 1985), better known as Felipe Mamão, is a Brazilian former professional footballer who played as a forward.

== Career ==
Trained in the Remo youth categories, he was the main player of Águia de Marabá team who gained access to the 2009 Campeonato Brasileiro Série C, Felipe Mamão received his nickname (papaya) from his father, who also had this nickname.
