= Batistão =

Multi-use stadium in Aracaju, Brazil

Coordinates: 10°55′36″S 37°02′57″W

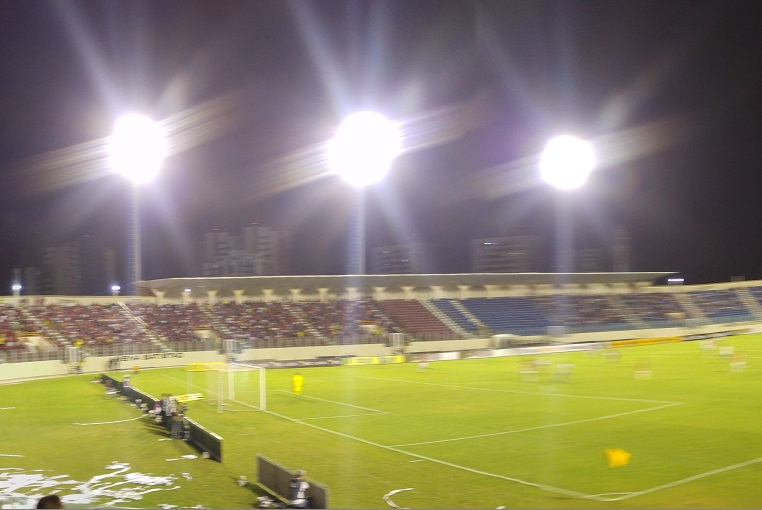
- Interactive map of Batistão
- Full name: Estádio Lourival Baptista
- Location: Aracaju, Sergipe, Brazil
- Owner: State of Sergipe
- Capacity: 15,575
- Surface: Grass

Construction
- Opened: 9 July 1969
- Architect: Aurelino Teles

Tenants
- Associação Desportiva Confiança; Cotinguiba; Vasco Esporte Clube

Estádio Lourival Baptista, commonly known as Batistão, is a multi-use stadium located in Aracaju, Brazil. It is used mostly for football matches and hosts the home matches of Associação Desportiva Confiança, Cotinguiba, Club Sportivo Sergipe and Vasco Esporte Clube. The stadium has a maximum capacity of 15,575 people, and was built in 1969.
