= Sociedade Boca Júnior Futebol Clube =

Boca Júnior
- Full name: Sociedade Boca Júnior Futebol Clube
- Nickname: Genérico argentino
- Founded: 25 October 1993
- Ground: Estádio Governador Augusto Franco, Cristinápolis, Sergipe
- Capacity: 2,500
Home colors	Away colors

Sociedade Boca Júnior Futebol Clube, commonly known as Boca Júnior, is a Brazilian football club based in Cristinápolis, Sergipe state.

== History ==
The club was founded on 25 October 1993, and has its name and colors in homage to Argentine club Boca Juniors.

=== Men's team ===
Boca Júnior won the Campeonato Sergipano Série A2 in 2004, when they beat América in the final, and in 2007, when they beat São Domingos in the final, and Boca Júnior's Rivanílton was the competition's top goal scorer with six goals.

=== Women's team ===
They competed in the Copa do Brasil for the first time in 2008, when they were eliminated in the First Round by Parnamirim. Boca Júnior competed again in 2010, when they were eliminated in the First Round by Vitória das Tabocas, from Pernambuco state.

== Honours ==
=== State ===
- Campeonato Sergipano Série A2
  - Winners (2): 2004, 2007

=== Women's Football ===
- Campeonato Sergipano de Futebol Feminino
  - Winners (3): 2010, 2012, 2016

== Stadium ==
The club play their home games at Estádio Governador Augusto Franco, nicknamed Francão. The stadium has a maximum capacity of 2,000 people.
