= Laranjeiras Esporte Clube =

Laranjeiras
- Full name: Laranjeiras Esporte Clube
- Founded: February 22, 2008
- Ground: Estádio Aníbal Franco, Laranjeiras, Sergipe state, Brazil
- Capacity: 3,000
| Home colours | Away colours |

Laranjeiras Esporte Clube, commonly known as Laranjeiras, is a Brazilian football club based in Laranjeiras, Sergipe state.

== History ==
The club was founded on February 22, 2008. Laranjeiras reached the semifinal stage of the Campeonato Sergipano Série A2 in 2009, when they were eliminated by Riachuelo.

== Stadium ==
Laranjeiras Esporte Clube play their home games at Estádio Aníbal Franco. The stadium has a maximum capacity of 3,000 people.
