= Fernando Pilar =

Brazilian footballer (born 1979)

Personal information
- Full name: Fernando Gleber Matias da Silva
- Date of birth: February 2, 1979 (age 47)
- Place of birth: Paraíba, Brazil
- Height: 1.82 m (6 ft 0 in)
- Position: Midfielder

Team information
- Current team: River Plate

Senior career*
Years	Team	Apps	(Gls)
1998–2002	Vasco	-	(-)
2002–2004	Campinense	-	(-)
2004–2007	Central	-	(-)
2007–2008	Paços de Ferreira	5	(0)
2009	Botafogo-PB		
2011–	River Plate		
- * Club domestic league appearances and goals

Fernando Gleber Matias da Silva, better known as Fernando Pilar, is a Brazilian footballer currently playing for Sociedade Esportiva River Plate. Fernando was born in Paraíba, Brazil on 2 February 1979. Fernando Pilar began his career with Brazilian team Vasco from 1998 to 2002 when he moved to lower division team Campinense for two years until 2004 when he was transferred from Campinense to Central, where he had three seasons with great performances and because of his performances he was bought by Portuguese team Paços de Ferreira.
