= Riachuelo Futebol Clube =

Riachuelo
- Full name: Riachuelo Futebol Clube
- Nickname(s): RFC
- Founded: June 11, 1933
- Ground: Estádio Francisco Leite, Riachuelo, Sergipe state, Brazil
- Capacity: 2,000
Home colours	Away colours

Riachuelo Futebol Clube, commonly known as Riachuelo, is a Brazilian football club based in Riachuelo, Sergipe state. They won the Campeonato Sergipano once.

== History ==
The club was founded on June 11, 1933. They won the Campeonato Sergipano in 1941, and the Campeonato Sergipano Série A2 in 2002.

== Honours ==
- Campeonato Sergipano
  - Winners (1): 1941
  - Runners-up (3): 1943, 1947, 1953
- Campeonato Sergipano Série A2
  - Winners (1): 2002
- Taça Estado de Sergipe
  - Winners (1): 2004

== Stadium ==
Riachuelo Futebol Clube play their home games at Estádio Francisco Leite. The stadium has a maximum capacity of 2,000 people.
