= Centro Sportivo Maruinense =

Maruinense
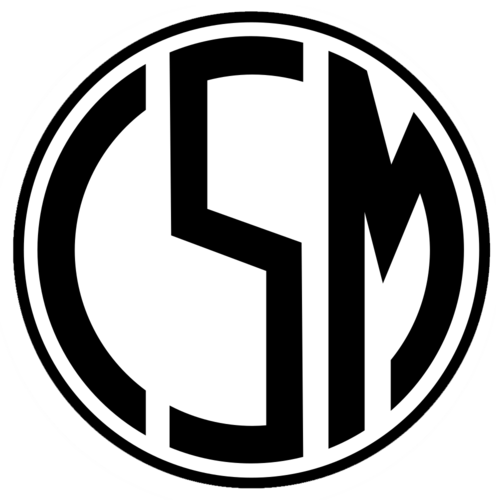
- Full name: Centro Sportivo Maruinense
- Nickname(s): Fantasminha Camarada; CSM
- Founded: April 3, 1917
- Ground: Vavazão, Maruim, Sergipe state, Brazil
- Capacity: 10,235
Home colours	Away colours

Centro Sportivo Maruinense, commonly known as Maruinense, or as CSM is a Brazilian football club based in Maruim, Sergipe state. They competed twice the Série C. The club was formerly known as Socialista Sport Club.

== History ==
The club was founded on April 3, 1917, as Socialista Sport Club, being renamed to Centro Sportivo Maruinense in the late 1960s as a way to attract more supporters. Maruinense competed in the Série C in 1994, when they reached the Quarterfinals of the competition being eliminated by Uberlândia, and in 1995, when they were eliminated in the First Round of the competition. They won the Campeonato Sergipano Série A2 in 2003.

== Achievements ==
- Campeonato Sergipano Série A2:
  - Winners (2): 2003,2020

== Stadium ==
Centro Sportivo Maruinense play their home games at Estádio Governador Antônio Carlos Valadares, nicknamed Vavazão. The stadium has a maximum capacity of 10,235 people.
