= Associação Atlética Guarany =

Guarany
- Full name: Associação Atlética Guarany
- Nickname(s): Galo do Sertão
- Founded: January 1, 1940
- Ground: Estádio Caio Feitosa, Porto da Folha, Sergipe state, Brazil
- Capacity: 3,000
Home colours	Away colours

Associação Atlética Guarany, commonly known as Guarany, is a Brazilian football club based in Porto da Folha, Sergipe state.

== History ==
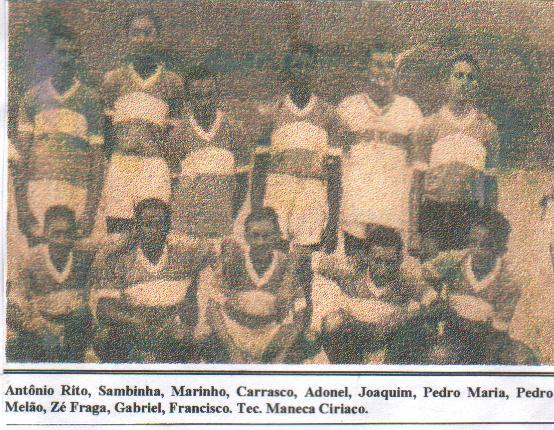
Guarany's first team, 1940.

The club was founded on January 1, 1940. Guarany won the Campeonato Sergipano Série A2 in 1988, 2001, 2018 and 2024.

== Honours ==
- Campeonato Sergipano Série A2
  - Winners (4): 1988, 2001, 2018, 2024

== Stadium ==
Associação Atlética Guarany play their home games at Estádio Caio Feitosa. The stadium has a maximum capacity of 3,000 people.
