= Associação Desportiva Freipaulistano =

Freipaulistano
- Full name: Associação Desportiva Freipaulistano
- Nicknames: Touro do Agreste (Agreste's Bull); Galácticos do Sertão (Galactics from Sertão)
- Founded: 29 August 2016; 9 years ago
- Ground: Estádio Jairton Menezes de Mendonça
- Capacity: 4,000
- President: Carlos Daniel Menezes
- Head coach: Betinho
- League: Campeonato Sergipano Série A2
- 2025: Sergipano Série A2, 4th of 10
Home colors	Away colors

Associação Desportiva Freipaulistano, or Freipaulistano, as they are usually called, is a Brazilian football team from Frei Paulo in Sergipe, founded on August 29, 2016.

Freipaulistano is currently ranked fourth among Sergipe teams in CBF's national club ranking, at 151st place overall.

== Stadium ==
Freipaulistano play their home games at Estádio Jairton Menezes de Mendonça. The stadium has a maximum capacity of 4,000 people.

== Honours ==
- Campeonato Sergipano
  - Winners (1): 2019
- Campeonato Sergipano Série A2
  - Winners (1): 2016
