= Esporte Clube Propriá =

Propriá
- Full name: Esporte Clube Propriá
- Nickname(s): Avoengo da Ribeirinha
- Founded: October 12, 1913 (111 years ago)
- Ground: Estádio Constantino Tavares, Propriá, Sergipe state, Brazil
- Capacity: 5,000
Home colors	Away colors

Esporte Clube Propriá, commonly known as Propriá, is a Brazilian football club based in Propriá, Sergipe state. They won the Campeonato Sergipano once.

== History ==
The club was founded on October 12, 1913, as Sergipe Foot-Ball Club. The club was renamed to Esporte Clube Propriá on June 14, 1956.

== Stadium ==
Esporte Clube Propriá play their home games at Estádio Constantino Tavares. The stadium has a maximum capacity of 5,000 people.
