= Cotinguiba Esporte Clube =

Brazilian football club

Cotinguiba
- Full name: Cotinguiba Esporte Clube
- Nickname(s): Tubarão da Praia; O Decano da Fundição
- Founded: 10 October 1909; 115 years ago
- Ground: Batistão, Aracaju, Sergipe state, Brazil
- Capacity: 15,575
Home colors	Away colors

Cotinguiba Esporte Clube, commonly known as Cotinguiba, is a Brazilian football club based in Aracaju, Sergipe state. They won the Campeonato Sergipano six times.

== History ==
The club was founded on October 10, 1909. They won the Campeonato Sergipano in 1918, 1920, 1923, 1936, 1942, and in 1952, and the Campeonato Sergipano Série A2 in 1993.

== Honours ==
=== State ===
- Campeonato Sergipano
  - Winners (6): 1918, 1920, 1923, 1936, 1942, 1952
  - Runners-up (2): 1976, 1979
- Campeonato Sergipano Série A2
  - Winners (1): 1993
- Torneio Início do Sergipe
  - Winners (6): 1920, 1928, 1929, 1933, 1934, 1948

=== City ===
- Campeonato Municipal
  - Winners (1): 1957

== Stadium ==
Cotinguiba Esporte Clube play their home games at Estádio Lourival Baptista, nicknamed Batistão. The stadium has a maximum capacity of 14,000 people.
