= Neópolis =

Municipality in Sergipe, Brazil

Coordinates: 10°19′12″S 36°34′44″W

- Municipality
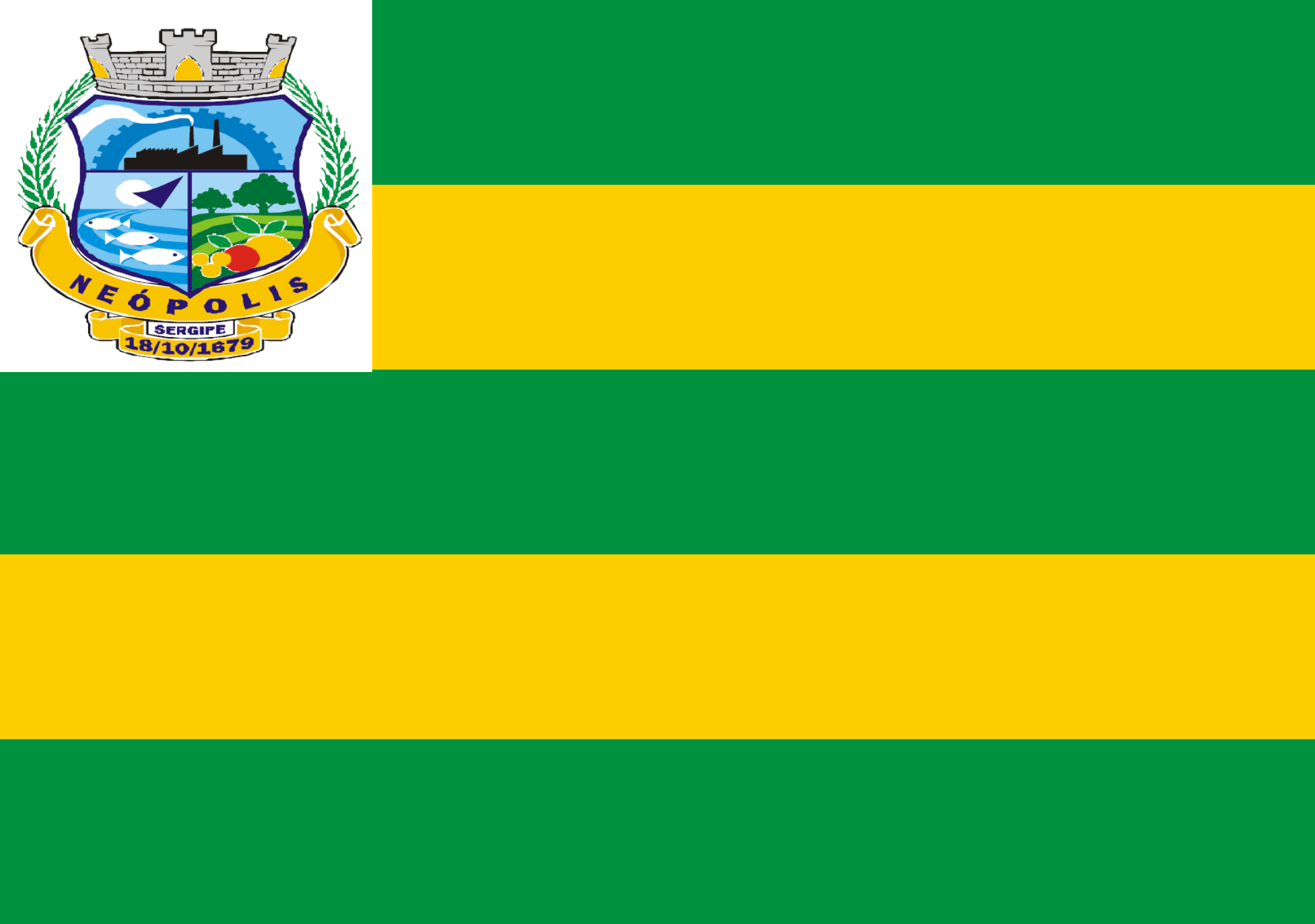
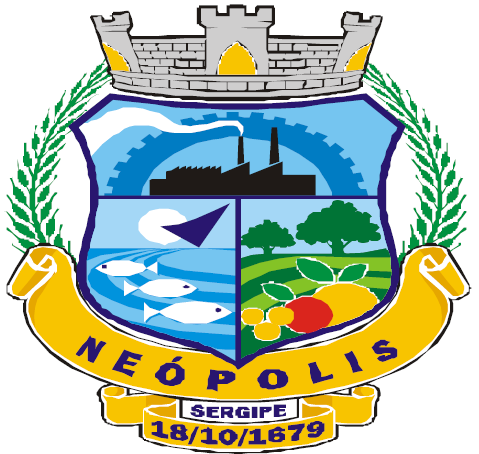
- Flag Coat of arms
- Interactive map of Neópolis
- Country: Brazil
- Time zone: UTC−3 (BRT)

Neópolis (Brazilian Portuguese: [neˈɔpolis]) is a municipality located in the Brazilian state of Sergipe. Its population was 18,703 in 2020 and its area is 259.33 km^{2} (100.13 sq mi).

== See also ==
- List of municipalities in Sergipe
