= Coritiba Foot Ball Club (Sergipe) =

Coritiba de Sergipe
- Full name: Itabaiana Coritiba Foot Ball Clube
- Nickname(s): Coxa Sergipano; Coxa Serrano; Coxa Nordestino
- Founded: September 14, 1972; 52 years ago
- Ground: Estádio Presidente Médici, Itabaiana, Sergipe, Brazil
- Capacity: 11,000
Home colours	Away colours

Coritiba Foot Ball Club, commonly known as Coritiba de Sergipe or simply Coritiba, is a Brazilian football and futsal club based in Itabaiana, Sergipe, Brazil.

== History ==
The club was founded as a futsal club on 14 September 1972, by the politician and former sportsman Wilson Gia da Cunha, who named the club after Paraná club Coritiba Foot Ball Club, adopting similar name, colors and team kits.

=== Football ===
They won the Campeonato Sergipano Série A2 in 1998 and 2013

=== Futsal ===
Coritiba won the Campeonato Sergipano de Futsal in 1993, 1994, 1995, 1996, 1997, 1998, and in 1999, the Liga Norte-Nordeste de Futsal in 1998, and the Copa do Nordeste de Futsal in 1999.

== Honours ==
=== Football ===
- Campeonato Sergipano Série A2:
  - Winners (2): 1998, 2013

=== Futsal ===
- Liga Norte-Nordeste de Futsal:
  - Winners (1): 1998
- Copa do Nordeste de Futsal:
  - Winners (1): 1999
- Campeonato Sergipano de Futsal:
  - Winners (7): 1993, 1994, 1995, 1996, 1997, 1998, 1999

== Stadium ==
Coritiba play their home games at the Estádio Presidente Emílio Garratazu Médici, commonly known as Estádio Presidente Médici. The stadium has a maximum capacity of 11,000 people.
