= Gararu =

Municipality in Sergipe, Brazil

Gararu Município de Gararu
- Municipality
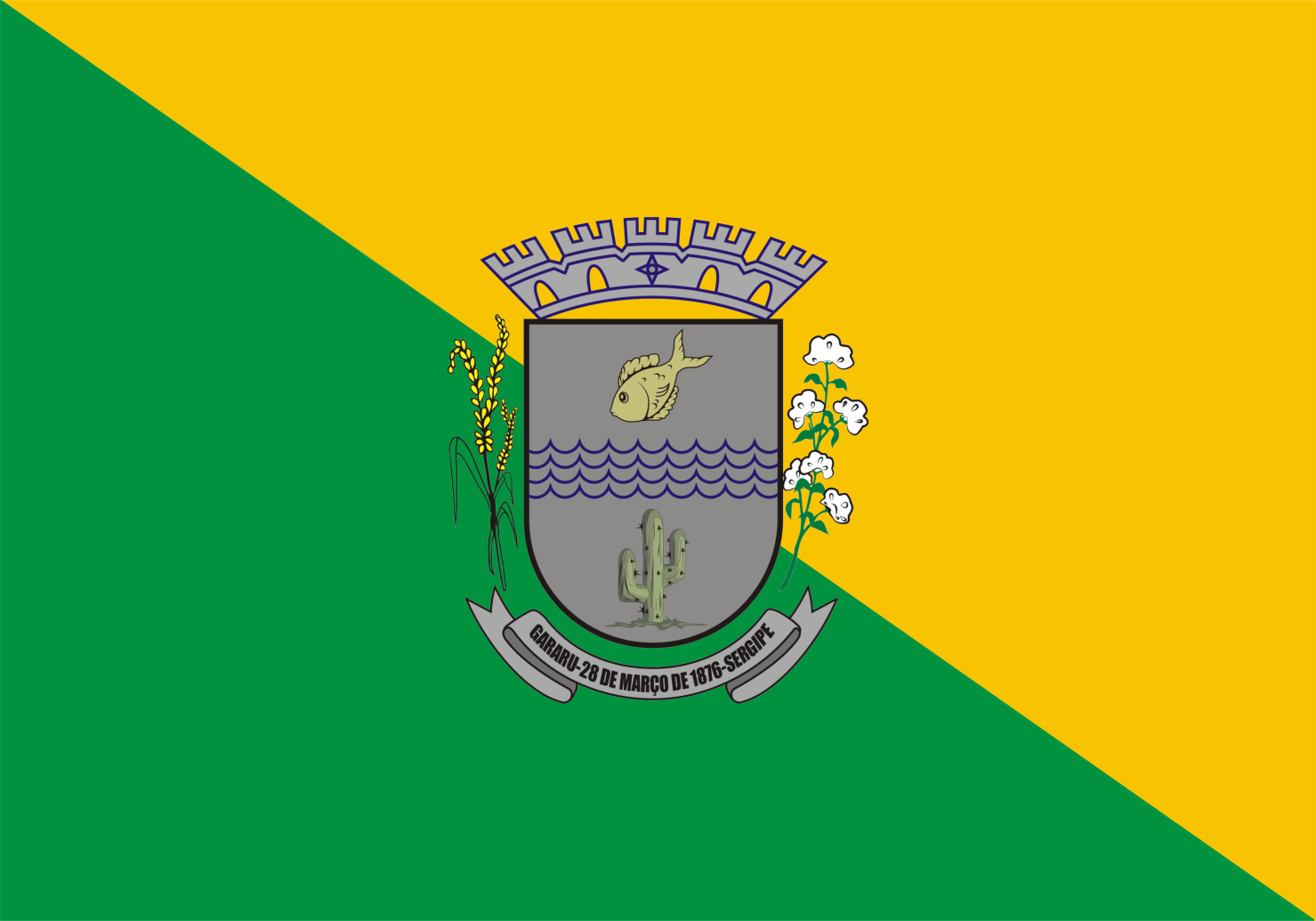
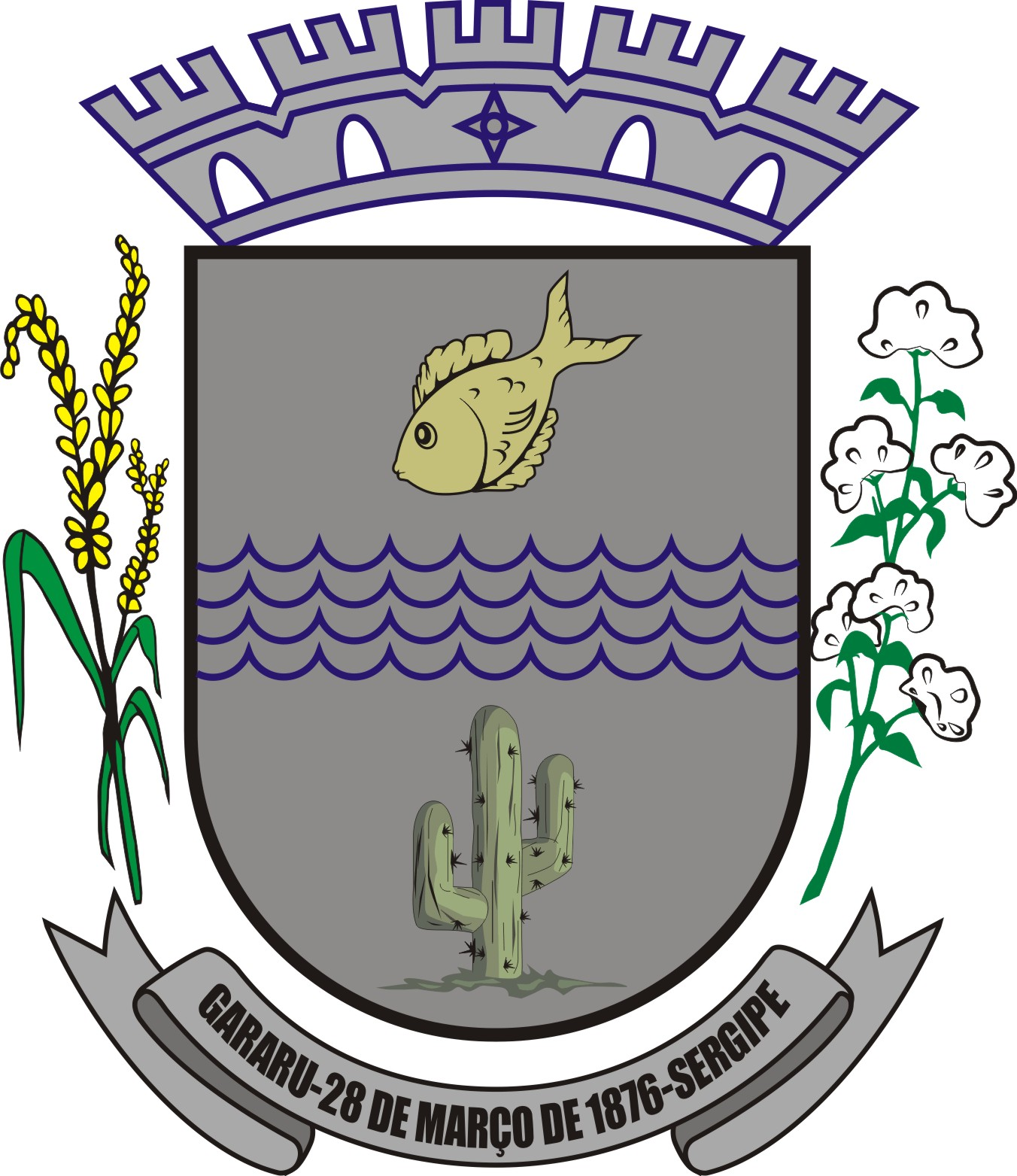
- Flag Coat of arms

- Location of Gararu in Sergipe

- Location of Gararu in Brazil
- Coordinates: 09°58′04″S 37°04′58″W
- Country: Brazil
- Region: Northeast
- State: Sergipe
- Founded: March 15, 1877

Government
  - Mayor: Toinho de Rolemberg

Area
  - Total: 654.4 km^{2} (252.7 sq mi)

Population (2020)
  - Total: 11,601
  - Density: 17.73/km^{2} (45.91/sq mi)
- Demonym: Gararuense
- Time zone: UTC−3 (BRT)
- Website: gararu.se.gov.br

Gararu (Central northeastern portuguese pronunciation: [ɡɐɾɐˈɾu]) is a municipality located in the Brazilian state of Sergipe. Its population was 11,601 (2020), covers 654.4 km^{2} (252.7 mi^{2}), and has a population density of 18 inhabitants per square kilometer.

The municipality was designated a priority area for conservation and sustainable use when the Caatinga Ecological Corridor was created in 2006.

== See also ==
- List of municipalities in Sergipe
