= Vasco Esporte Clube =

Vasco
- Full name: Vasco Esporte Clube
- Nickname: Clube da Cruz de Malta
- Founded: August 15, 1931
- Ground: Batistão, Aracaju, Sergipe state, Brazil
- Capacity: 15,575
Home colours	Away colours

Vasco Esporte Clube, commonly known as Vasco, is a Brazilian football club based in Aracaju, Sergipe state. They won the Campeonato Sergipano four times.

== History ==
The club was founded on August 15, 1931, as Vasco da Gama Futebol Clube, and changed to its current name in 1946. Vasco won the Campeonato Sergipano in 1944, 1948, 1953, and in 1987.

== Honours ==
- Campeonato Sergipano
  - Winners (4): 1944, 1948, 1953, 1987
  - Runners-up (5): 1945, 1949, 1962, 1993, 1998
- Torneio Início do Sergipe
  - Winners (2): 1947, 1961

== Stadium ==
Vasco Esporte Clube play their home games at Estádio Lourival Baptista, nicknamed Batistão. The stadium has a maximum capacity of 14,000 people.
