= Atlético Clube Lagartense =

Lagartense
- Full name: Atlético Clube Lagartense
- Nickname: Verdão
- Founded: August 11, 1992; 33 years ago
- Ground: Barretão, Lagarto, Sergipe state, Brazil
- Capacity: 8,000
Home colors	Away colors

Atlético Clube Lagartense, commonly known as Lagartense, is a Brazilian football club based in Lagarto, Sergipe state. They competed in the Copa do Brasil twice.

== History ==
The club was founded on August 11, 1992. Lagartense won the Campeonato Sergipano in 1998. The club competed in the Copa do Brasil in 1999 and in 2001, they were eliminated in the First Round in both seasons, respectively by Fluminense and Santa Cruz.

== Honours ==
=== Inter-state ===
- Copa Alagipe
  - Runners-up (1): 2005

=== State ===
- Campeonato Sergipano
  - Winners (1): 1998
- Torneio Início do Sergipe
  - Winners (1): 1976

== Stadium ==
Atlético Clube Lagartense play their home games at Estádio Paulo Barreto de Menezes, nicknamed Barretão. The stadium has a maximum capacity of 8,000 people.
