= Maruim =

Municipality in Sergipe, Brazil

Maruim Município de Maruim
- Municipality
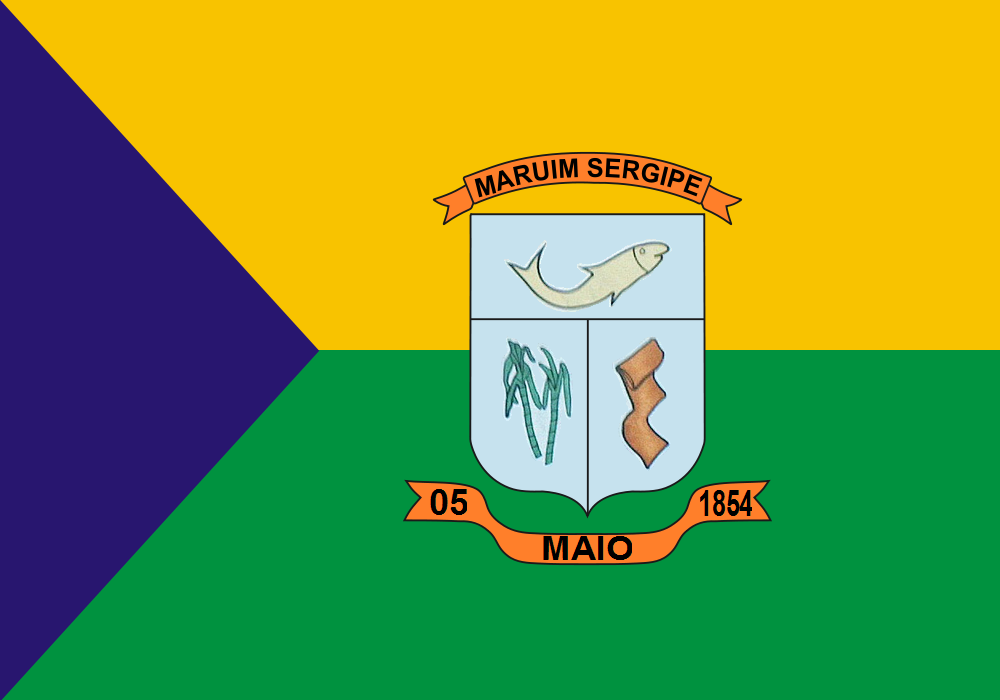
- Flag Coat of arms

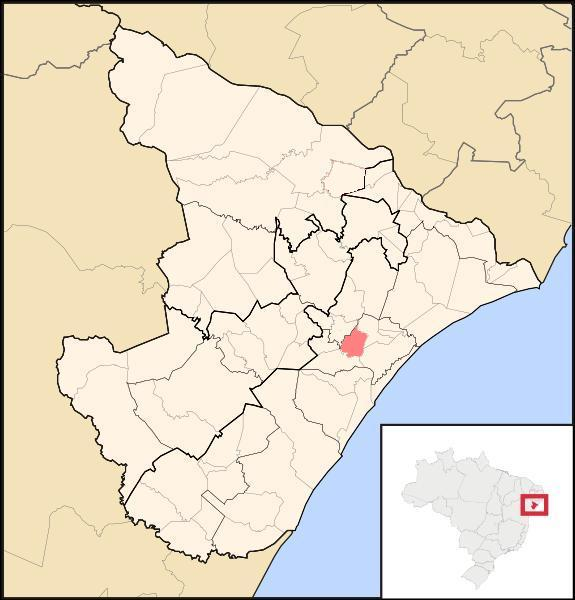
- Location of Maruim in Sergipe

- Location of Maruim in Brazil
- Coordinates: 10°44′16″S 37°4′55″W
- Country: Brazil
- Region: Northeast
- State: Sergipe
- Founded: May 5, 1854

Government
  - Mayor: Jéferson Santos de Santana

Area
  - Total: 95.55 km^{2} (36.89 sq mi)
- Elevation: 10 m (33 ft)

Population (2020)
  - Total: 17,271
  - Density: 180.8/km^{2} (468.1/sq mi)
- Time zone: UTC−3 (BRT)
- Website: maruim.se.gov.br

Maruim (Brazilian Portuguese: [maɾuˈĩ]) is a municipality located in the Brazilian state of Sergipe. Its population was 17,271 (2020) and covers 95.55 km^{2} (36.89 mi^{2}). Maruim has a population density of 180 inhabitants per square kilometer. It is located 30 km (19 mi) from the state capital of Sergipe, Aracaju. Maruim borders the municipalities of Laranjeiras, Rosário do Catete, and Santo Amaro das Brotas, all within the state of Sergipe.

The Sergipe River makes up the southern border of Marium, and the Ganhamoroba River, a major tributary of the Sergipe, crosses in a north-south direction through the municipality.

== Etymology ==
The name of the municipality of Maruim comes from the Tupi–Guarani term mberu'i, meaning a small fly or mosquito.

== History ==
The first Portuguese colonial settlement in the area was near the Sergipe River and was called Mombaça. The settlement served as an important point of transfer of sugar cane from the interior of Sergipe to Bahia, Pernambuco, and Rio de Janeiro. Mombaça was abandoned due to mosquito-born diseases to relocated to its current location on higher ground on the sugar plantation of Engenho Maruim de Baixo. The village was founded on February 19, 1835 as Santo Amaro do Maroim and elevated to city stats on May 5, 1854. Steamboat service was established between Aracaju, Maruim and Laranjeiras in 1855, further boosting commerce in the region.

== See also ==
- List of municipalities in Sergipe
