= Cristinápolis =

Municipality in Sergipe, Brazil

Canindé de Cristinápolis
- Municipality
- The Municipality of Cristinápolis
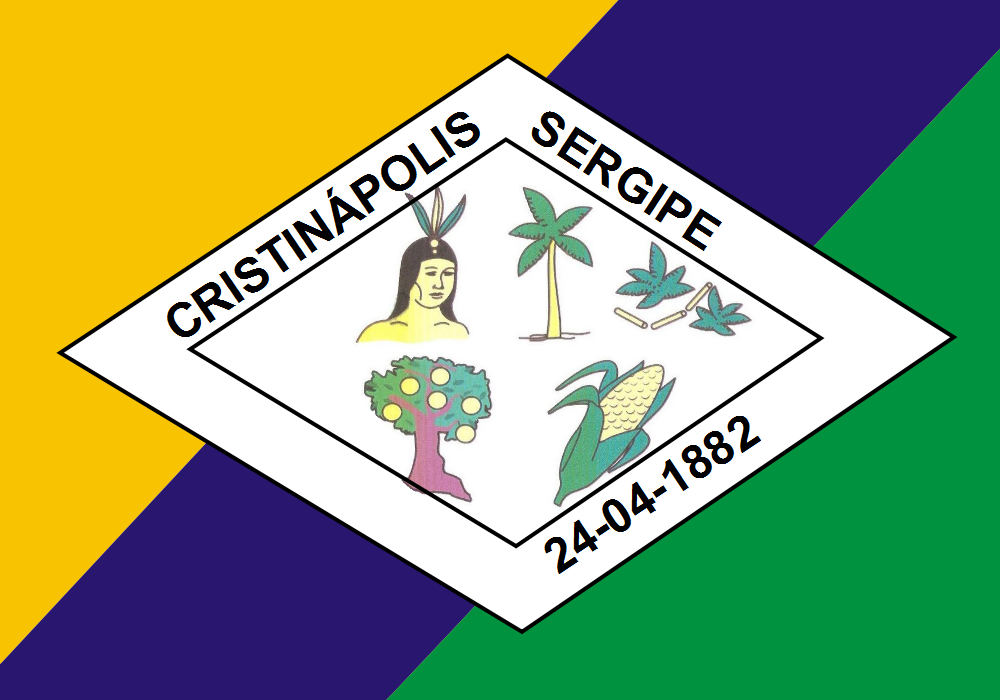
- Flag Coat of arms

- Location of Cristinápolis in the State of Sergipe
- Coordinates: 11°28′33″S 37°45′18″W
- Country: Brazil
- Region: Northeast
- State: Sergipe

Area
  - Total: 251.3 km^{2} (97.0 sq mi)
- Elevation: 145 m (476 ft)

Population (2020)
  - Total: 18,029
- Time zone: UTC−3 (BRT)
- HDI (2000): 0.577 – medium

Cristinápolis (Brazilian Portuguese: [kɾistʃiˈnapolis]) is the southernmost municipality in the Brazilian state of Sergipe. Its population was 18,029 in the year 2020, and its area is 251.3 km^{2} (97.0 sq mi).

== See also ==
- List of municipalities in Sergipe
