= Pirambu =

- Municipality
- Flag Coat of arms

- Location in Brazil
- Coordinates: 10.738°S 36.856°W
- Country: Brazil
- State: Sergipe

Population (2020)
  - Total: 9,359
- Time zone: UTC−3 (BRT)

Pirambu (Central northeastern Portuguese pronunciation: [piɾɐ̃ˈbu]) is a municipality located in the Brazilian state of Sergipe. Its population was 9,359 (2020) and its area is 218 km^{2}.

The municipality contains part of the 5,547 hectares (13,710 acres) Santa Isabel Biological Reserve, a strictly protected conservation unit created in 1988.

== See also ==
- List of municipalities in Sergipe
