= Campeonato Sergipano =

Football league in Sergipe, Brazil

- Organising body: FSF
- Founded: 1918; 108 years ago (as different amateur leagues); 1960; 66 years ago (as Campeonato Sergipano profissional)
- Country: Brazil
- State: Sergipe
- Level on pyramid: 1
- Relegation to: Campeonato Sergipano Série A2
- Domestic cup: Copa do Brasil
- Current champions: Sergipe (38th title) (2026)
- Most championships: Sergipe (38 titles)
- Website: FSF Official website

The Campeonato Sergipano is the top-flight professional state football league in the Brazilian state of Sergipe. It is run by the Sergipe Football Federation (FSF).

Professionalism was introduced into Sergipe football in 1960, with the first state championship involving professional players being held that year.

== History ==
The first football championship in Sergipe was held in 1918. The competition, organised by the Liga Desportiva Sergipana (LDS, Sergipe Sports League), featured four teams: Cotinguiba, 41° Batalhão FC, Sergipe, and Industrial. Cotinguiba emerged as champions, defeating Sergipe 2-0 in the final match. In 1919, no championship was held.

From 1920 to 1948, the matches took place at the Adolpho Rolemberg stadium, considered one of the best in the north and northeast regions, according to newspapers of the time.

In 1927, a new entity was established, the Liga Sergipana de Esportes Atléticos (LSEA, Sergipe Athletic Sports League), with only three affiliated clubs: Associação Atlética, América, and Palmeiras, while the LDS had four affiliated clubs: Sergipe, Brasil, Cotinguiba, and Aracaju.

In 1928, the LSEA took full control of football in Sergipe, following the dissolution of the LDS and the subsequent affiliation of its clubs to the newly created league.

In 1931, eight more clubs joined the LSEA: Vasco, Guarani, Paulistano, Palestra, Vitório, Siqueira Campos, 13 de Julho, and ETEA.

From 1936 onwards, the Sergipe championship began to include clubs from the Sergipe countryside, with Ipiranga from the city of Maruim being the first.

In 1939, the championship was organised with a "Division of the Interior", comprising four affiliated clubs (Ipiranga, Riachuelo, Socialista, and Laranjeiras), and a "Division of the Capital". Ipiranga won the interior championship, while Sergipe won the capital championship. In a "best of three" series between the two, Sergipe became the overall champion of 1939, scoring two goals in extra time in the decisive match. However, Ipiranga filed an appeal with the league against Sergipe, which had included player Renato Vieira, registered with the Paulista League. Upon consultation, the latter confirmed the complaint made by the Maruim-based club. As a result, the LSEA proclaimed Ipiranga the champion of Sergipe for 1939. This format of competition continued until 1958.

In 1959, the championship was divided into zones: East (capital), North, South, and Centre. The top five teams from the capital joined the champions from the interior zones and competed in a two-round Sergipe Championship.

In 1960, a mixed professional system was introduced, and the first professional championship was held that year.

In 1970, the "Era of Batistão" began, with the stadium inaugurated in June 1969, boasting a capacity of 45,000 people. During the 1970s, the average paying attendance at Batistão was 8,000 people.

In the 1980 championship, a promotion and relegation system was introduced.

== List of champions ==
=== Amateur era ===
| Season | Champions | Runners-up |
|---|---|---|
| 1918 | Cotinguiba (1) | Sergipe |
| 1919 | Not held | |
| 1920 | Cotinguiba (2) | |
| 1921 | Industrial (1) | Sergipe |
| 1922 | Sergipe (1) | |
| 1923 | Cotinguiba (3) | Industrial |
| 1924 | Sergipe (2) | |
| 1925–1926 | Not held | |
| 1927 | Sergipe (3) | |
| 1928 | Sergipe (4) | |
| 1929 | Sergipe (5) | |
| 1930–1931 | Not held | |
| 1932 | Sergipe (6) | |
| 1933 | Sergipe (7) | |
| 1934 | Palestra (1) | Vitória |
| 1935 | Palestra (2) | Sergipe |
| 1936 | Cotinguiba (4) | |
| 1937 | Sergipe (8) | |
| 1938 | Not held | |
| 1939 | Ipiranga (1) | Sergipe |
| 1940 | Sergipe (9) | Laranjeiras |
| 1941 | Riachuelo (1) | |
| 1942 | Cotinguiba (5) | |
| 1943 | Sergipe (10) | Riachuelo |
| 1944 | Vasco (1) | Ipiranga |
| 1945 | Ipiranga (2) | Vasco |
| 1946 | Olímpico (1) | Ipiranga |
| 1947 | Olímpico (2) | Riachuelo |
| 1948 | Vasco (2) | Olímpico |
| 1949 | Palestra (3) | Vasco |
| 1950 | Passagem (1) | Paulistano |
| 1951 | Confiança (1) | Passagem |
| 1952 | Cotinguiba (6) | Passagem |
| 1953 | Vasco (3) | Riachuelo |
| 1954 | Confiança (2) | Passagem |
| 1955 | Sergipe (11) | Confiança |
| 1956 | Santa Cruz (1) | Paulistano |
| 1957 | Santa Cruz (2) | Cotinguiba |
| 1958 | Santa Cruz (3) | Confiança |
| 1959 | Santa Cruz (4) | Olímpico |

=== Professional era ===
| Season | Champions | Runners-up |
|---|---|---|
| 1960 | Santa Cruz (5) | Sergipe |
| 1961 | Sergipe (12) | Santa Cruz |
| 1962 | Confiança (3) | Vasco |
| 1963 | Confiança (4) | Sergipe |
| 1964 | Sergipe (13) | Santa Cruz |
| 1965 | Confiança (5) | América de Propriá |
| 1966 | América de Propriá (1) | Confiança |
| 1967 | Sergipe (14) | Confiança |
| 1968 | Confiança (6) | Sergipe |
| 1969 | Itabaiana (1) | Olímpico |
| 1970 | Sergipe (15) | Itabaiana |
| 1971 | Sergipe (16) | Itabaiana |
| 1972 | Sergipe (17) | Lagarto EC |
| 1973 | Itabaiana (2) | Sergipe |
| 1974 | Sergipe (18) | Confiança |
| 1975 | Sergipe (19) | Lagarto EC |
| 1976 | Confiança (7) | Cotinguiba |
| 1977 | Confiança (8) | Sergipe |
| 1978 | Itabaiana (3) | Sergipe |
| 1979 | Itabaiana (4) | Cotinguiba |
| 1980 | Itabaiana (5) | Confiança |
| 1981 | Itabaiana (6) | Sergipe |
| 1982 | Itabaiana (7) | Tie for champion |
| 1982 | Sergipe (20) | Tie for champion |
| 1983 | Confiança (9) | Estanciano |
| 1984 | Sergipe (21) | Confiança |
| 1985 | Sergipe (22) | Itabaiana |
| 1986 | Confiança (10) | Sergipe |
| 1987 | Vasco (4) | Itabaiana |
| 1988 | Confiança (11) | Sergipe |
| 1989 | Sergipe (23) | Confiança |
| 1990 | Confiança (12) | Sergipe |
| 1991 | Sergipe (24) | Confiança |
| 1992 | Sergipe (25) | Confiança |
| 1993 | Sergipe (26) | Vasco |
| 1994 | Sergipe (27) | Confiança |
| 1995 | Sergipe (28) | Confiança |
| 1996 | Sergipe (29) | Olímpico de Itabaianinha |
| 1997 | Itabaiana (8) | Confiança |
| 1998 | Lagartense (1) | Vasco |
| 1999 | Sergipe (30) | Lagartense |
| 2000 | Confiança (13) | Tie for champion |
| 2000 | Sergipe (31) | Tie for champion |
| 2001 | Confiança (14) | Lagartense |
| 2002 | Confiança (15) | Itabaiana |
| 2003 | Sergipe (32) | Confiança |
| 2004 | Confiança (16) | Sergipe |
| 2005 | Itabaiana (9) | Sergipe |
| 2006 | Pirambu (1) | Confiança |
| 2007 | América de Propriá (2) | Confiança |
| 2008 | Confiança (17) | Sergipe |
| 2009 | Confiança (18) | Sergipe |
| 2010 | River Plate (1) | Confiança |
| 2011 | River Plate (2) | São Domingos |
| 2012 | Itabaiana (10) | Confiança |
| 2013 | Sergipe (33) | River Plate |
| 2014 | Confiança (19) | Socorrense |
| 2015 | Confiança (20) | Estanciano |
| 2016 | Sergipe (34) | Itabaiana |
| 2017 | Confiança (21) | Itabaiana |
| 2018 | Sergipe (35) | Itabaiana |
| 2019 | Freipaulistano (1) | Itabaiana |
| 2020 | Confiança (22) | Sergipe |
| 2021 | Sergipe (36) | Lagarto FC |
| 2022 | Sergipe (37) | Falcon |
| 2023 | Itabaiana (11) | Confiança |
| 2024 | Confiança (23) | Sergipe |
| 2025 | Confiança (24) | Itabaiana |
| 2026 | Sergipe (38) | Confiança |

== Titles by clubs ==
Teams in bold still active.

| Rank | Club | Winners | Winning years |
|---|---|---|---|
| 1 | **Sergipe** | 38 | 1922, 1924, 1927, 1928, 1929, 1932, 1933, 1937, 1940, 1943, 1955, 1961, 1964, 1967, 1970, 1971, 1972, 1974, 1975, 1982 (shared), 1984, 1985, 1989, 1991, 1992, 1993, 1994, 1995, 1996, 1999, 2000 (shared), 2003, 2013, 2016, 2018, 2021, 2022, 2026 |
| 2 | **Confiança** | 24 | 1951, 1954, 1962, 1963, 1965, 1968, 1976, 1977, 1983, 1986, 1988, 1990, 2000 (shared), 2001, 2002, 2004, 2008, 2009, 2014, 2015, 2017, 2020, 2024, 2025 |
| 3 | **Itabaiana** | 11 | 1969, 1973, 1978, 1979, 1980, 1981, 1982 (shared), 1997, 2005, 2012, 2023 |
| 4 | **Cotinguiba** | 6 | 1918, 1920, 1923, 1936, 1942, 1952 |
| 5 | Santa Cruz | 5 | 1956, 1957, 1958, 1959, 1960 |
| 6 | Vasco | 4 | 1944, 1948, 1953, 1987 |
| 7 | Palestra | 3 | 1934, 1935, 1949 |
| 8 | **América de Propriá** | 2 | 1966, 2007 |
| 8 | Ipiranga | 2 | 1939, 1945 |
| 8 | Olímpico | 2 | 1946, 1947 |
| 8 | River Plate | 2 | 2010, 2011 |
| 12 | **Frei Paulistano** | 1 | 2019 |
| 12 | Industrial | 1 | 1921 |
| 12 | Lagartense | 1 | 1998 |
| 12 | Passagem | 1 | 1950 |
| 12 | Pirambu | 1 | 2006 |
| 12 | **Riachuelo** | 1 | 1941 |

=== By city ===
| City | Championships | Clubs |
|---|---|---|
| Aracaju | 78 | Sergipe (38), Confiança (24), Cotinguiba (6), Vasco (4), Palestra (3), Olímpico (2), Industrial (1) |
| Itabaiana | 11 | Itabaiana (11) |
| Estância | 5 | Santa Cruz (5) |
| Carmópolis | 2 | River Plate (2) |
| Maruim | 2 | Ipiranga (2) |
| Propriá | 2 | América (2) |
| Frei Paulo | 1 | Frei Paulistano (1) |
| Lagarto | 1 | Lagartense (1) |
| Neópolis | 1 | Passagem (1) |
| Pirambu | 1 | Pirambu (1) |
| Riachuelo | 1 | Riachuelo (1) |

== See also ==
- Campeonato Sergipano Série A2
