= Sociedade Esportiva River Plate =

River Plate
- Full name: Sociedade Esportiva River Plate
- Nickname(s): River do Carmo; Leão Sergipano; Time de espírito argentino
- Founded: 18 August 1967
- Dissolved: 2013; 12 years ago
- Ground: Estádio Idalito Oliveira, Carmópolis
- Capacity: 2,500
- President: Ernando Rodrigues dos Santos
- Head coach: Dário Lourenço
Home colors	Away colors

Sociedade Esportiva River Plate, commonly known as River Plate, was a Brazilian football club based in Carmópolis, Sergipe state. They competed in the Série D twice.

== History ==
The club was founded on August 18, 1967. River Plate won the Campeonato Sergipano Second Level in 2009, and the First Level in 2010. The club competed in the 2010 Série D, when they were eliminated in the First Stage of the competition. They won the Campeonato Sergipano First Level again in 2011, after beating São Domingos in the final, and competed in the Série D in the same year, when they were eliminated in the First Stage.

== Honours ==
- Campeonato Sergipano
  - Winners (2): 2010, 2011
- Campeonato Sergipano Second Level
  - Winners (2): 1991, 2009
- Taça Cidade de Aracaju
  - Winners (1): 2011

== Current squad ==
Note: Flags indicate national team as defined under FIFA eligibility rules; some limited exceptions apply. Players may hold more than one non-FIFA nationality.

No.	Pos.	Nation	Player
—	GK	(Brazil) BRA	Pablo Willians
—	GK	(Brazil) BRA	Paulo
—	GK	(Brazil) BRA	Ramiro
—	DF	(Brazil) BRA	Fabiano
—	DF	(Brazil) BRA	Pedrinho
—	DF	(Brazil) BRA	Glawber
—	DF	(Brazil) BRA	Fernando Belém
—	MF	(Brazil) BRA	Váldson
—	MF	(Brazil) BRA	Fernando Pilar
—	MF	(Brazil) BRA	Wallace
—	MF	(Brazil) BRA	Lele

No.	Pos.	Nation	Player
—	MF	(Brazil) BRA	Júnior Maranhão
—	MF	(Brazil) BRA	Claudinei
—	MF	(Brazil) BRA	Bibi
—	MF	(Brazil) BRA	Lucas
—	MF	(Brazil) BRA	Almir
—	FW	(Brazil) BRA	Fábio Junior
—	FW	(Brazil) BRA	Raphael Freitas
—	FW	(Brazil) BRA	Da Silva
—	FW	(Brazil) BRA	Cristiano Alagoano
—	FW	(Brazil) BRA	Curinga
—	FW	(Brazil) BRA	Felipe Mamão
