= Tobias Barreto, Sergipe =

Municipality in Sergipe, Brazil

Coordinates: 11°11′02″S 37°59′52″W

- Municipality
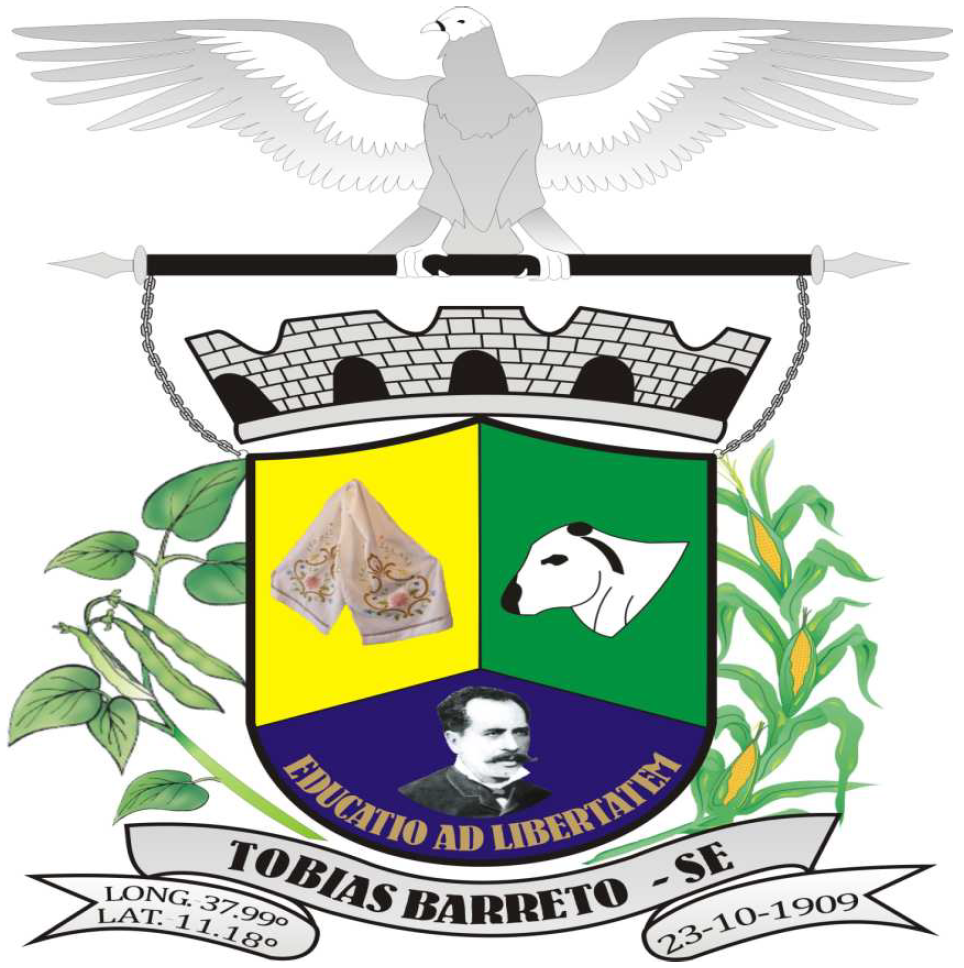
- Flag Coat of arms
- Interactive map of Tobias Barreto, Sergipe
- Country: Brazil
- Time zone: UTC−3 (BRT)

Tobias Barreto (Brazilian Portuguese: [toˈbi.ɐz baˈʁetu]) is a municipality located in the Brazilian state of Sergipe. Its population is 52,530 (2020) and its area is 1,033 km^{2} (399 sq mi).

It was formerly known as Vila de Campos do Rio Real, but was rechristened Tobias Barreto in order to honor the homonymous poet who was born in there.

== See also ==
- List of municipalities in Sergipe
