= Porto da Folha =

Municipality in Sergipe, Brazil

Porto da Folha Município de Porto da Folha
- Municipality
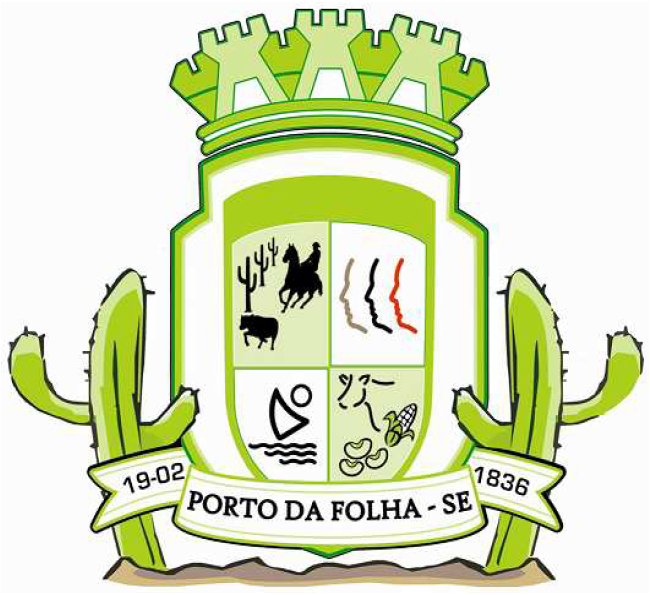
- Flag Coat of arms

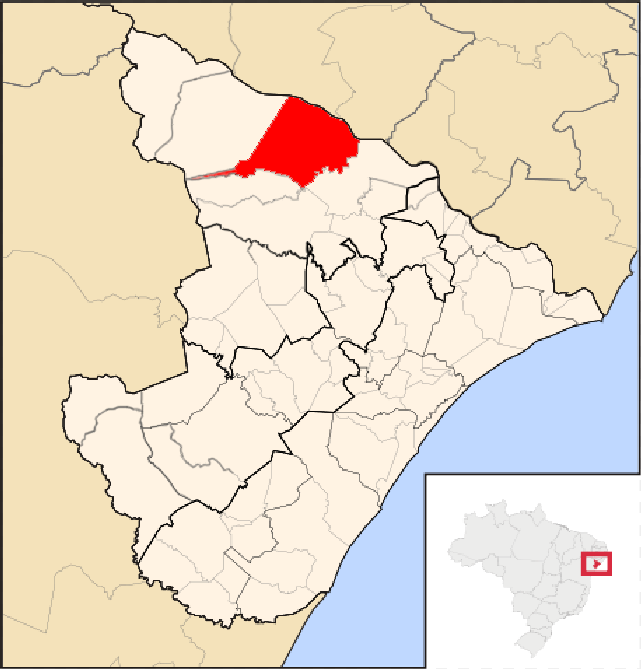
- Location of Porto da Folha in Sergipe

- Location of Porto da Folha in Brazil
- Coordinates: 9°55′01″S 37°16′40″W
- Country: Brazil
- Region: Northeast
- State: Sergipe
- Founded: 1835

Government
  - Mayor: Albino Tavares de Almeida Neto

Area
  - Total: 876.67 km^{2} (338.48 sq mi)
- Elevation: 38 m (125 ft)

Population (2020)
  - Total: 28,693
  - Density: 32.730/km^{2} (84.769/sq mi)
- Demonym: Porto-folhense
- Time zone: UTC−3 (BRT)

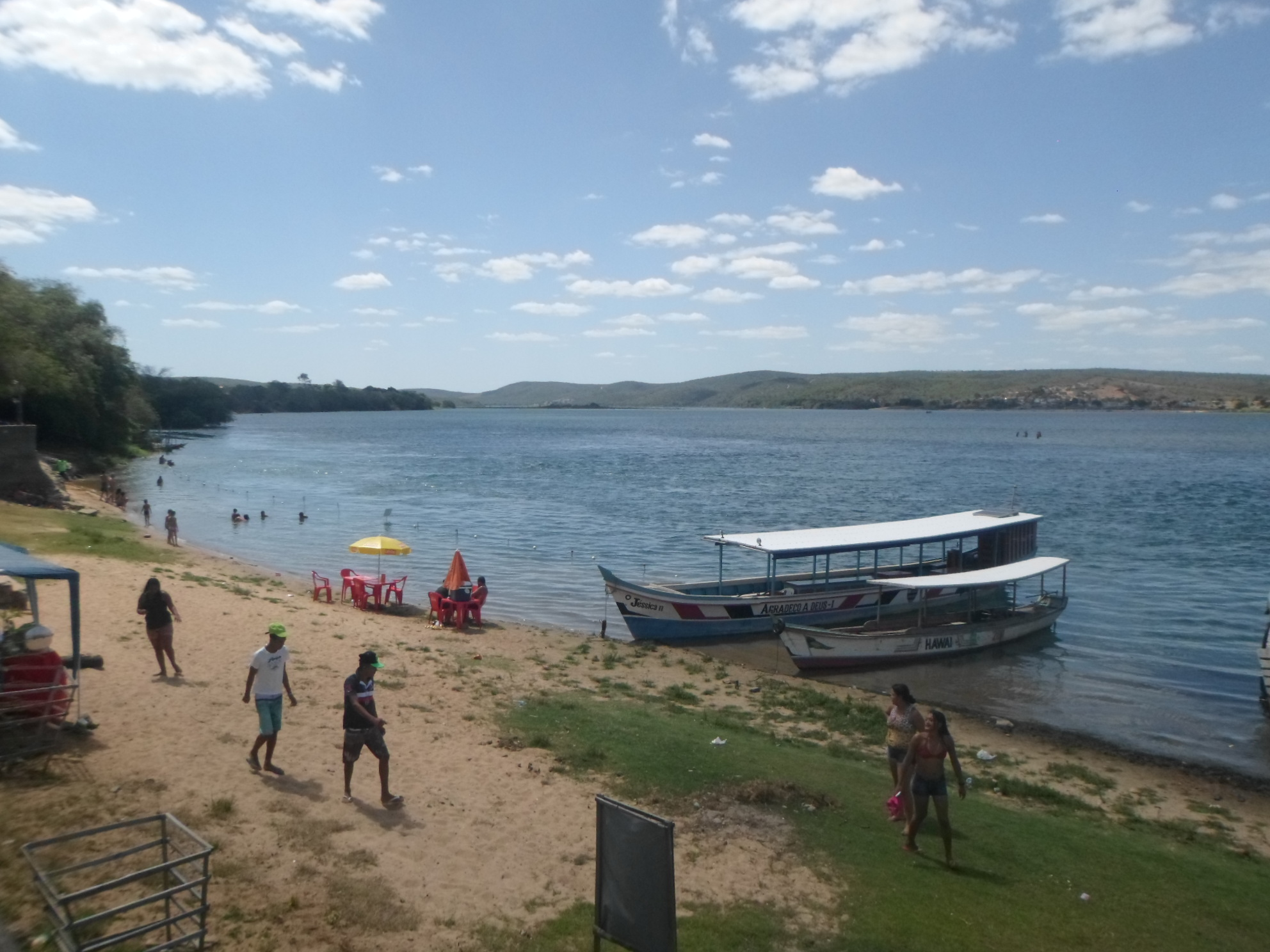
Section of recreational beach, São Francisco River, Ilha do Ouro, Porto da Folha

Porto da Folha (Brazilian Portuguese: [ˈpoʁtu da ˈfoʎɐ]) is a municipality located in the Brazilian state of Sergipe. It has a population of 28,693 (2020) and covers an area of 876.67 km^{2} (338.48 mi^{2}). Porto da Folha has a population density of 33 inhabitants per square kilometer. It is located 165 km (103 mi) from the state capital of Sergipe, Aracaju.

The Igreja da Ilha de São Pedro dates back to the beginning of the colonization of the region in the 18th century. The church is constructed of local stone masonry. It was designated as a historic site by the State of Sergipe in 1984 and restored in 2011. Beside the church, there is a ruin that may have been the monastery of the Capuchin friars, who were the earliest European settlers in the region.

Porto da Folha is home to the Xokó people, an indigenous group of 340 people. The Xokó live in the villages of São Pedro and Caiçara, both within Porto da Folha. Most of the community lives on Ilha de São Pedro.

== See also ==
- List of municipalities in Sergipe
