= Itabaianinha =

Municipality in Sergipe, Brazil

Coordinates: 11°16′26″S 37°47′24″W

- Municipality
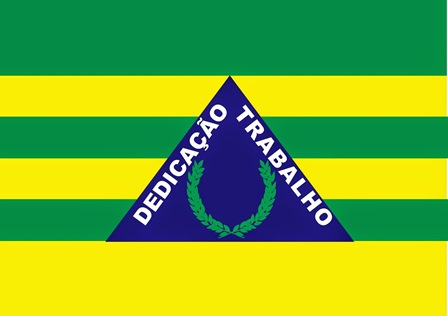
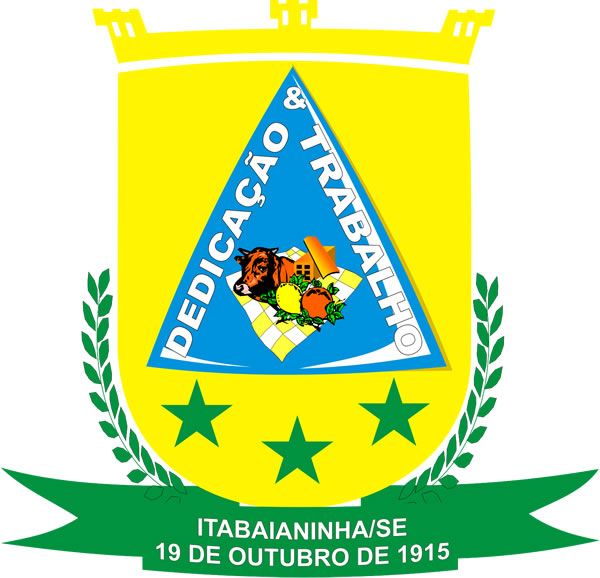
- Flag Coat of arms
- Interactive map of Itabaianinha
- Country: Brazil
- Time zone: UTC−3 (BRT)

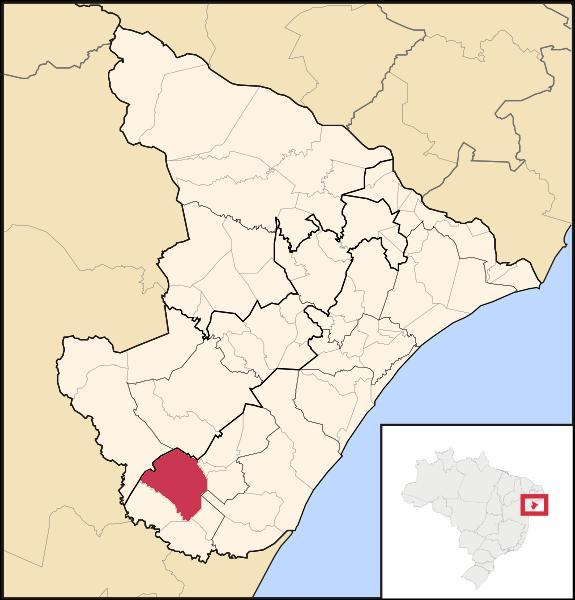

Itabaianinha (Brazilian Portuguese: [itabajɐˈnĩɲɐ]) is a municipality located in the Brazilian state of Sergipe. In 2020, its population was 42,166, and its area is 493 km^{2} (190 sq mi).

Itabaianinha is noted for its large dwarf population. It is sometimes called "a cidade dos anões" ("the city of dwarfs"). The dwarfism is of the proportionate type and arises from a rare genetic mutation. The population probably originated through intrafamily marriages. The condition has been shown to have no effect on normal lifespan. In the late 1990s many residents of Itabaianinha under 15 years started receiving hormonal treatment. The population of dwarfs is dwindling, with only an estimated one hundred remaining, mostly in the village of Carretéis, ten miles from Itabaianinha center.

== Geography ==
=== Climate ===
Climate data for Itabaianinha (1991–2020)
Month	Jan	Feb	Mar	Apr	May	Jun	Jul	Aug	Sep	Oct	Nov	Dec	Year
Mean daily maximum °C (°F)	31.8 (89.2)	31.8 (89.2)	31.8 (89.2)	30.5 (86.9)	28.7 (83.7)	27.2 (81.0)	26.5 (79.7)	26.7 (80.1)	27.9 (82.2)	29.7 (85.5)	31.0 (87.8)	31.8 (89.2)	29.6 (85.3)
Daily mean °C (°F)	26.1 (79.0)	26.2 (79.2)	26.3 (79.3)	25.6 (78.1)	24.3 (75.7)	23.1 (73.6)	22.3 (72.1)	22.3 (72.1)	23.2 (73.8)	24.5 (76.1)	25.3 (77.5)	25.9 (78.6)	24.6 (76.3)
Mean daily minimum °C (°F)	22.3 (72.1)	22.5 (72.5)	22.6 (72.7)	22.3 (72.1)	21.3 (70.3)	20.1 (68.2)	19.2 (66.6)	19.1 (66.4)	19.8 (67.6)	20.8 (69.4)	21.7 (71.1)	22.1 (71.8)	21.2 (70.2)
Average precipitation mm (inches)	63.6 (2.50)	62.7 (2.47)	79.0 (3.11)	109.3 (4.30)	170.8 (6.72)	166.7 (6.56)	138.5 (5.45)	99.5 (3.92)	74.5 (2.93)	52.1 (2.05)	45.6 (1.80)	29.8 (1.17)	1,092.1 (43.00)
Average precipitation days (≥ 1.0 mm)	5.8	6.0	8.3	11.1	14.5	17.6	17.9	16.0	9.8	6.1	4.9	3.5	121.5
Average relative humidity (%)	75.9	76.9	78.1	81.4	85.0	86.6	85.5	84.2	81.7	78.7	77.3	76.1	80.6
Average dew point °C (°F)	21.9 (71.4)	22.3 (72.1)	22.7 (72.9)	22.7 (72.9)	22.1 (71.8)	21.3 (70.3)	20.3 (68.5)	20.0 (68.0)	20.4 (68.7)	20.9 (69.6)	21.4 (70.5)	21.7 (71.1)	21.5 (70.7)
Mean monthly sunshine hours	222.9	197.8	205.7	186.5	168.0	143.8	156.5	166.0	173.5	210.7	210.4	226.8	2,268.6
Source: NOAA

== See also ==
- List of municipalities in Sergipe
