= Propriá =

Municipality in Sergipe, Brazil

Coordinates: 10°12′39″S 36°50′24″W

- Municipality
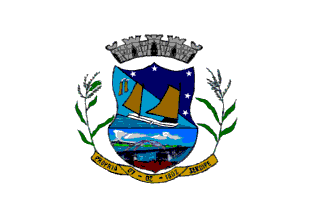
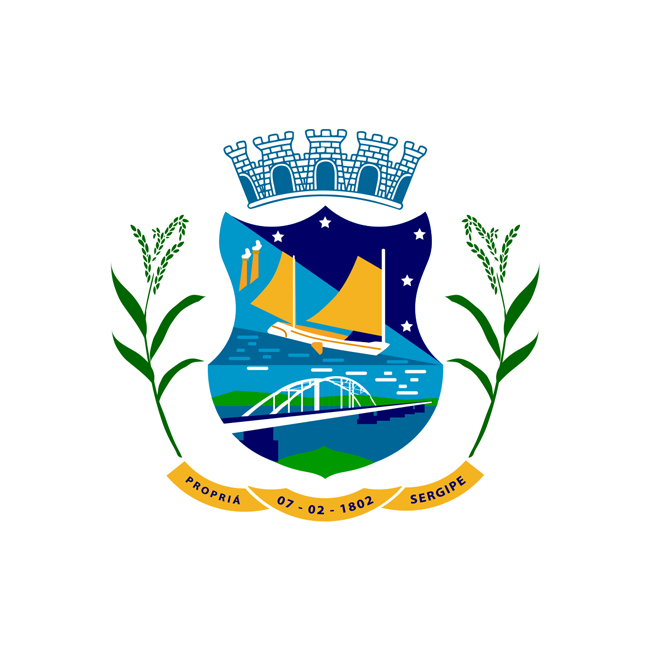
- Flag Coat of arms
- Interactive map of Propriá
- Country: Brazil
- Time zone: UTC−3 (BRT)

Propriá (Brazilian Portuguese: [pɾopɾiˈa]) is a municipality located in the Brazilian state of Sergipe. Its population was 29,692 (2020) and its area is 95 km^{2} (37 sq mi).

== Sports ==
There are two football clubs in Propriá. América and Propriá. América owns José Neto Stadium, which has a maximum capacity of 3,000 people, and Propriá owns Constantino Tavares Stadium, which has a maximum capacity of 5,000 people. Also, both clubs plays at João Alves Filho Stadium, which has a maximum capacity of 3,000 people and is owned by Sergipe's state government.

== Religion ==
Propriá is the seat of a Roman Catholic diocese, which covers 8,181 square kilometers (3,159 square miles), including the 95 square kilometers (36.67 square miles) of the municipality. The total population of the diocese is approximately 347,000 of which approximately 77% are Catholic. The bishop is Vítor Agnaldo de Menezes

== Climate ==
Climate data for Propriá (1991–2020)
| Month | Jan | Feb | Mar | Apr | May | Jun | Jul | Aug | Sep | Oct | Nov | Dec | Year |
|---|---|---|---|---|---|---|---|---|---|---|---|---|---|
| Mean daily maximum °C (°F) | 33.5 (92.3) | 33.5 (92.3) | 33.6 (92.5) | 32.3 (90.1) | 30.4 (86.7) | 28.9 (84.0) | 28.0 (82.4) | 28.3 (82.9) | 29.8 (85.6) | 31.7 (89.1) | 33.1 (91.6) | 33.7 (92.7) | 31.4 (88.5) |
| Daily mean °C (°F) | 27.7 (81.9) | 28.0 (82.4) | 28.0 (82.4) | 27.1 (80.8) | 25.9 (78.6) | 24.4 (75.9) | 23.6 (74.5) | 23.7 (74.7) | 24.6 (76.3) | 26.1 (79.0) | 27.2 (81.0) | 27.7 (81.9) | 26.2 (79.2) |
| Mean daily minimum °C (°F) | 23.1 (73.6) | 23.5 (74.3) | 23.7 (74.7) | 23.2 (73.8) | 22.4 (72.3) | 21.3 (70.3) | 20.5 (68.9) | 20.0 (68.0) | 20.5 (68.9) | 21.4 (70.5) | 22.3 (72.1) | 23.0 (73.4) | 22.1 (71.8) |
| Average precipitation mm (inches) | 53.0 (2.09) | 32.3 (1.27) | 57.8 (2.28) | 102.9 (4.05) | 166.5 (6.56) | 153.3 (6.04) | 141.6 (5.57) | 83.8 (3.30) | 54.4 (2.14) | 38.1 (1.50) | 19.8 (0.78) | 20.8 (0.82) | 924.3 (36.39) |
| Average precipitation days (≥ 1.0 mm) | 4.2 | 4.1 | 6.0 | 10.0 | 14.6 | 16.5 | 18.2 | 13.4 | 8.4 | 4.2 | 2.8 | 3.2 | 105.6 |
| Average relative humidity (%) | 69.6 | 70.6 | 71.5 | 75.7 | 81.4 | 83.7 | 83.8 | 81.7 | 78.1 | 73.1 | 70.2 | 68.8 | 75.7 |
| Average dew point °C (°F) | 22.1 (71.8) | 22.5 (72.5) | 22.8 (73.0) | 23.0 (73.4) | 22.9 (73.2) | 22.1 (71.8) | 21.3 (70.3) | 20.9 (69.6) | 21.2 (70.2) | 21.4 (70.5) | 21.7 (71.1) | 21.9 (71.4) | 22.0 (71.6) |
| Mean monthly sunshine hours | 214.9 | 202.9 | 215.7 | 193.2 | 173.1 | 152.6 | 154.1 | 169.8 | 160.4 | 180.3 | 200.7 | 220.6 | 2,238.3 |
Source: NOAA

== See also ==
- List of municipalities in Sergipe
