= Federação Sergipana de Futebol =

Football federation of Sergipe, Brazil

- Formation: 10 November 1926; 99 years ago
- Type: List of international sport federations
- Headquarters: Aracaju, Sergipe, Brazil
- Official language: Portuguese
- President: José Carivaldo de Souza
- Website: https://www.fsf-se.com.br/

The Federação Sergipana de Futebol (English: Football Association of Sergipe state) was founded on November 10, 1926, and it manages all the official football tournaments within the state of Sergipe, which are the Campeonato Sergipano, the Campeonato Sergipano Série A2 and the Copa Governador do Estado de Sergipe, and represents the clubs at the Brazilian Football Confederation (CBF).
