= Olímpico Esporte Clube =

Olímpico
- Full name: Olímpico Esporte Clube
- Nickname: Dragão da Zona Sul
- Founded: 18 August 1958; 67 years ago
- Ground: Souzão, Itabaianinha, Sergipe state, Brazil
- Capacity: 2,000
- League: Campeonato Sergipano Série A2
- 2025: Sergipano Série A2, 3rd of 10
Home colours	Away colours	Third colours

Olímpico Esporte Clube, commonly known as Olímpico, is a Brazilian football club based in Itabaianinha, Sergipe state.

== History ==
The club was founded on August 18, 1958. Olímpico de Pirambu won the Campeonato Sergipano Série A2 in 1994.

== Achievements ==
- Campeonato Sergipano Série A2:
  - Winners (1): 1994

== Stadium ==
Olímpico Esporte Clube play their home games at Estádio Denison Fontes Souza, nicknamed Souzão. The stadium has a maximum capacity of 2,000 people.
