= Club Sportivo Sergipe =

Brazilian football team

Sergipe
- Full name: Club Sportivo Sergipe
- Nicknames: Colorado; O Mais Querido (The Most Loved); Gipão
- Founded: 17 October 1909; 117 years ago
- Ground: João Hora de Oliveira
- Capacity: 6,000
- President: Moisés Santana
- Head coach: Paulo Massaro
- League: Campeonato Brasileiro Série D Campeonato Sergipano
- 2025 2025: Série D, 22nd of 64; Sergipano, 7th of 10
Home colors	Away colors

Club Sportivo Sergipe, or Sergipe as they are usually called, is a Brazilian football team from Aracaju, the second-oldest club in the state of Sergipe, founded on 17 October 1909. Club Sportivo Sergipe is the only team from Sergipe to have played against foreign opposition, having faced the Argentina youth team, Sparta Prague, Alianza Lima and the Ghana national team. Sergipe is the only team to have won six state championships in a row. Sergipe's main rival is Confiança. Sergipe's home field is the Estádio João Hora de Oliveira, capacity 6,000.

Sergipe is the third-best ranked team from the state in CBF's national club ranking, at 82th overall.

== History ==
The club was founded on 17 October 1909, in Aracaju, by dissidents of Cotingüiba Esporte Clube. The latter club, named after the Cotinguiba River, had been founded on 10 October 1909, the first in Aracaju. The dissidents, including Adalberto Monteiro, Euclides Porto, Adalgiso Rosal, José Couto de Farias, Tancredo Campos, Américo Silva, Francisco Bessa and others, met at noon on October 11 in Commercial Association and decided the next Sunday to found Club Sportivo Sergipe. Sergipe was initially founded as a rowing club, and in January 1910 the first boat was baptized as Nereida. The first head office was in a garage on Ivo do Prado Avenue. Sergipe football club officially started in 1916.

In 1972, Sergipe became the first club from Sergipe state to compete in the Campeonato Brasileiro Série A, finishing in 26th and last place.

== Memorable victories ==
- 1-0 over Ceará state team in 1926;
- 4-2 over Botafogo–BA (Bahia state champions) in 1936;
- 3-1 over Alagoas state team in 1940;
- 8-2 over Vitória–BA in 1942;
- 2-0 over Bangu (Rio de Janeiro state champion) in 1967;
- 3-1 over Argentina youth team in 1968 (first match between local club and foreign team).
- 7-0 over Ceará Copa do Nordeste de 2001;

== Honours ==
=== Official tournaments ===
State
Competitions	Titles	Seasons
Campeonato Sergipano	38	1922, 1924, 1927, 1928, 1929, 1932, 1933, 1937, 1940, 1943, 1955, 1961, 1964, 1967, 1970, 1971, 1972, 1974, 1975, 1982, 1984, 1985, 1989, 1991, 1992, 1993, 1994, 1995, 1996, 1999, 2000, 2003, 2013, 2016, 2018, 2021, 2022, 2026
Copa Governo do Estado de Sergipe	1	2013

- record

=== Others tournaments ===
==== State ====
- Taça Cidade de Aracaju (2): 1996, 2001
- Taça Estado de Sergipe (1): 2003
- Torneio Início do Sergipe (6): 1921, 1942, 1946, 1963, 1967, 1970

=== Runners-up ===
- Copa SERBA (1): 2006
- Campeonato Sergipano (20): 1918, 1921, 1935, 1939, 1960, 1963, 1968, 1973, 1977, 1978, 1981, 1988, 1990, 2000, 2004, 2005, 2008, 2009 2020, 2024
- Copa Governo do Estado de Sergipe (5): 2003, 2005, 2009, 2012, 2025

== Sport Rowing ==
=== Honours ===
- Campeonato Sergipano de Remo: 1911, 1913, 1916, 1919, 1922, 1929, 1939,1940, 1941, 1942, 1943, 1944, 1946.

== Logo ==
The team logo, composed of an anchor and two paddles is because the club, initially, was dedicated to the practice of nautical sports.

== Ultras ==
- Torcida Esquadrão Colorado
- Torcida Gigante Rubro
