= Falcon Futebol Clube =

Falcon
- Full name: Falcon Futebol Clube
- Nickname: Carcará
- Founded: 23 November 2020; 5 years ago
- Ground: Estádio João Cruz
- President: Marcelo Bonfim
- Head coach: Luciano Quadros
- League: Campeonato Sergipano
- 2025: Sergipano, 6th of 10
| Home colours | Away colours |

Falcon Futebol Clube, commonly known as Falcon, is a Brazilian football club based in Barra dos Coqueiros, Sergipe. They compete in the Campeonato Sergipano.

== Appearances ==
Following is the summary of Falcon appearances in Campeonato Sergipano:

| Season | Division | Final position |
|---|---|---|
| 2021 | 2nd | 1st |
| 2022 | 1st | 2nd |
| 2023 | 1st | 5th |
| 2024 | 1st | 6th |
| 2025 | 1st | 4th |

The club also competed at national level, in the 2023 Copa do Brasil, being eliminated by Volta Redonda in the first round, and 2023 Campeonato Brasileiro Série D, qualifying in the group stage, reaching the round of 32, and being eliminated by Sousa.

== Honours ==
- Campeonato Sergipano:
  - Runners-up: 2022
- Campeonato Sergipano Série A2:
  - Winners (1): 2021
