= Estanciano Esporte Clube =

Estanciano
- Full name: Estanciano Esporte Clube
- Nickname: Canarinho do Piauitinga
- Founded: June 14, 1956
- Ground: Francão, Estância, Sergipe state, Brazil
- Capacity: 8,000
Home colours	Away colours

Estanciano Esporte Clube, commonly known as Estanciano, is a Brazilian football club based in Estância, Sergipe state.

== History ==
The club was founded on June 14, 1956. They finished in the second position in the Campeonato Sergipano Série A2 in 2010, when they lost the competition to Socorrense.

== Honours ==
=== State ===
- Campeonato Sergipano Série A2
  - Winners (1): 1997
- Campeonato Sergipano Série A3
  - Winners (1): 2025

=== Women's Football ===
- Campeonato Sergipano de Futebol Feminino
  - Winners (2): 2021, 2022

== Stadium ==
Estanciano Esporte Clube play their home games at Estádio Governador Augusto Franco, nicknamed Francão. The stadium has a maximum capacity of 8,000 people.
