= América Futebol Clube (Propriá) =

Brazilian football club from Propriá, Sergipe state

América de Propriá
- Full name: América Futebol Clube
- Nickname: Tricolor da Ribeirinha
- Founded: 8 August 1942; 84 years ago
- Ground: José Neto; João Alves Filho
- Capacity: 3,000 (José Neto); 3,000 (João Alves Filho)
- League: Campeonato Sergipano
- 2025: Sergipano, 4th of 10
Home colors	Away colors

América Futebol Clube, usually known simply as América or as América-SE, América (SE) or América do Sergipe, is a Brazilian football club from Propriá, Sergipe state.

== History ==
Unhappy members of Esporte Clube Propriá founded América Futebol Clube on August 8, 1942. The members were Durval Feitosa, Pedro Cardoso, Gerdiel Graça, José Rodrigues de Nelo, Miguel Apolônio, José Graça Leite, Eugênio Amaral, Normando Rogério Lima, and José Coutinho.

In 1960, the club professionalized its football section, following the changes made by the Federação Sergipana de Desportos (Sergipe Sports Federation).

In 1965, América was Sergipe State Championship runner-up. The club was defeated by Confiança in the final.

In 1966, the club won tis first title, the Sergipe State Championship, after beating Confiança in the final. América's players were França, Henário, Nadinho, Cabo Jorge, Periquito and Simas; Vilson, Dequinha, Tiquinho, Bobô and Geraldo. Also played for the club Pereirinha, Romero, Carlos Alberto, and the goalkeeper Tenisson. Pereirinha was the club's top goalscorer.

In 1967, was the only time that América competed in the Brazil Trophy. The team was in the same group of Treze, CSA and ABC, and finished in the last position.

The club won again the Sergipe State Championship in 2007, after defeating Itabaiana in the last match of the final four group stage. In the same year, América competed in the Campeonato Brasileiro Série C, but was eliminated in the first stage.

== Honours ==
- Campeonato Sergipano
  - Winners (2): 1966, 2007
  - Runners-up (1): 1965
- Campeonato Sergipano Série A2
  - Winners (2): 2006, 2012
- Torneio Início do Sergipe
  - Winners (1): 1965

== Stadium ==
América's home matches are usually played at its own stadium, José Neto, which has a maximum capacity of 3,000 people. However, the club also plays at João Alves Filho, which also has a maximum capacity of 3,000 people.

== Club colors, mascot and nickname ==
The club's colors are green, red and white.

América's mascot is a winged horse.

Tricolor da Ribeirinha, meaning Little River Tricolor, is the club's nickname.
