= Lagarto Futebol Clube =

Lagarto
- Full name: Lagarto Futebol Clube
- Nicknames: Verdão; Lagartense
- Founded: 20 April 2009; 17 years ago
- Ground: Barretão, Lagarto, Sergipe state, Brazil
- Capacity: 8,000
- League: Campeonato Brasileiro Série D Campeonato Sergipano
- 2025 2025: Série D, 23rd of 64; Sergipano, 3rd of 10
- Website: www.lagartofc.com.br
Home colors	Away colors

Lagarto Futebol Clube, commonly known as Lagarto, is a Brazilian football club based in Lagarto, Sergipe state.

Lagarto is currently ranked fifth among Sergipe teams in CBF's national club ranking, at 214th place overall.

== History ==
The club was founded on April 20, 2009. They finished in the second position in the Campeonato Sergipano Série A2 in 2011, losing the league to Sete de Junho, thus gaining promotion to the 2012 First Level.

== Stadium ==
Lagarto Futebol Clube play their home games at Estádio Paulo Barreto de Menezes, nicknamed Barretão. The stadium has a maximum capacity of 8,000 people.
