= Associação Desportiva Socorrense =

Socorrense
- Full name: Associação Desportiva Socorrense
- Nickname(s): Siri Metropolitano
- Founded: August 31, 2005
- Ground: Estádio Vanúzia Franco, Nossa Senhora do Socorro, Sergipe state, Brazil
- Capacity: 3,000
Home colours	Away colours

Associação Desportiva Socorrense, commonly known as Socorrense, is a Brazilian football club based in Nossa Senhora do Socorro, Sergipe state.

== History ==
The club was founded on August 31, 2005. Socorrense won the Campeonato Sergipano Série A2 in 2010.

== Achievements ==
- Campeonato Sergipano Série A2:
  - Winners (1): 2010

== Stadium ==
Associação Desportiva Socorrense play their home games at Estádio Vanúzia Franco. The stadium has a maximum capacity of 3,000 people.
